= 2008 British Rowing Championships =

- Venue: National Water Sports Centre
- Location: Holme Pierrepont (Nottingham)
- Dates: 18–20 July 2008

The 2008 British Rowing Championships were the 37th edition of the National Championships, held from 18–20 July 2008 at the National Water Sports Centre in Holme Pierrepont, Nottingham. They were organised and sanctioned by British Rowing, and are open to British rowers.

== Senior ==
=== Medal summary ===
Event	Gold	Silver	Bronze
Open 1x	Leander; I Lawson	Nottingham; D Marshall	Nottingham & Union; G R Coleman
Open 2-	Leander B T Edward Broadway, T Burton	Glasgow University; C Logan, I Rice	Leander A A Sinclair, A Webb
Open 2x	Leander A R Hunter, I Lawson	Leander B G M Laughton, T Wilkinson	Henley; V Caudrelier, D S Read
Open 4-	Leander; A R Ardron, A Moffatt, P Randolph, M Steeds	Leander / London / Durham; S Barr, O Mahony, C Pitt Ford, A Woods	Birmingham University / Durham University / Cardiff; T John Cookman, M Haines, D Hopper, A Hurley
Open 4x	Leander; A R Ardron/N Clark/G M Laughton/T Wilkinson	City of Oxford; M Balch, A Gillies, T Kingham, J Watson	Tideway Scullers School; T Arbeid, T C Marshall, R Twyman, A Young
Open 4+	Leander; M Bateman, N Clark, C Kennedy-Burn, J Orme, Z De Toledo	Henley; M Roger Ewing, M Ewing, J Hall, O Miller, H Glasson	Molesey; L Carey, J Foad, R G Ockendon, C M Wright, V Sethard-Wright
Open 8+	Leander; Bateman, Edward Broadway, Burton, Francis, Kennedy-Burn, Orme, Randolph, Steeds, Hill	Molesey / Ortner; Carey, Dowell, Foad, Thomas Johnson, G Ockendon, Turnham, Whale, M Wright, Sethard-Wright	Agecroft; Benson, Beresford, William Charles, Dawson, Large, Morgan, Sullivan, Warman, Shaddick
Women 1x	Glasgow; F Jacob	Nottingham; L Morton	Molesey; J Farmer
Women 2x	Rhwyfo Cymru / Worcester; J Lyons, R Rowe	Mortlake, Anglian & Alpha; O Power, A Townsend	Newcastle University; S Barnett, A Leake
Women 2-	Worcester; C Crozier, M Eriksson	Leander; J Cook, R A Loveridge	Thames; J Chichester, H Ratcliff
Women 4x	Imperial College; E L Thompson, R Smith, N Smith, J Forrester	Minerva Bath; G Louise Akers, H Glover, L Ryvar, V Thornley	University of London; L Birch, R Humphreys, C Moultrie, F Sanjana
Women 4-	Leander; J Cook, R A Loveridge, S Victoria Myers, L Rowbotham	University of London / Nottingham; L Entwistle/L Muir/M Relph/E Young	Osiris; E Rowles, P Sanders, J Smith, J Tamsin Whitlam
Women 4+	Furnivall SC; A L Brown, K Clitter, L Hopper, E Payne, M Hunt	City of Oxford; S Jordan, J Loveday, C Major, A Reid, A Baker	Stratford-upon-Avon; H Ferguson, M Johnston, L O Hare, S I Vance, J Smith
Women 8+	Thames; Tiffany Carpenter, Chichester, Day, Harland, Jones, Kennedy, Ratcliff, Elizabeth Theodorou, Cook	Oxford Brookes University / Rob Roy; L Adams, Elliott, Hawton, Hodges, Lindholt, Rau, Alice Robinson, Van Manen, O Neill	Furnivall SC; C Ainley, T Albrecht, A L Brown, M Buxton, K Clitter, C Hook, L Hopper, E Payne, M Hunt

== Lightweight ==
=== Medal summary ===
Event	Gold	Silver	Bronze
Open L1x	Thames	Leander	Clyde
Open L2x	Durham School / Tyne	Upper Thames	Cardiff City / Cardiff Univ of W
Open L2-	Leander	London	Imperial College
Open L4-	London	London / Leander / Durham University / Wallingford	Strathclyde Park
Open L4x	Tideway Scullers School	Imperial College / London	Trent / Star Club / Sudbury RC
Women L1x	Tideway Scullers School	Mortlake, Anglian & Alpha	Clyde
Women L2x	Mortlake, Anglian & Alpha	Reading	Clyde
Women L2-	Mortlake, Anglian & Alpha	Loughborough Students	Clyde
Women L4x	Mortlake, Anglian & Alpha	Vesta / London / Tideway Scullers School	Clydesdale / Strathclyde Park
Women L4-	Mortlake, Anglian & Alpha	Marlow	Nottingham

== Coastal ==
=== Medal summary ===
Event	Gold	Silver	Bronze
Open 1x	Itchen Imperial	Ryde B	Ryde A
Open 4+	BTC (Southampton)	Ryde	Itchen Imperial

== U 23 ==
=== Medal summary ===
Event	Gold	Silver	Bronze
Open 1x	Newcastle University	University of Wales Col.Cardiff	Clydesdale
Open 2x	University of Wales Col.Cardiff	Bath University	Cantabrigian / Pembroke Cambridge
Women 1x	Nottingham	Clyde	Reading University
Women 2x	Newcastle University	King's School Canterbury	Mortlake, Anglian & Alpha

== Junior ==
=== Medal summary ===
Event	Gold	Silver	Bronze
Open J18 1x	Marlow	Maidenhead	Llandaff
Open J18 2-	Rhwyfo Cymru	Reading Blue Coat School	Maidstone Invicta
Open J18 2x	Grange School	Wallingford	Windsor Boys' School
Open J18 4-	Maidenhead	Rhwyfo Cymru	Durham School / Bradford GS / Queen Elizabeth HS
Open J18 4x	Sir William Borlase	Marlow	Windsor Boys' School
Open J18 4+	Rhwyfo Cymru	RGS Worcester / The Alice Ottley School	St.Peters School
Open J16 1x	Peterborough City	George Watson's College	St Ives
Open J16 2-	George Watson's College	Evesham	Christchurch / Gloucester
Open J16 2x	George Watson's College	Yarm School	Weybridge
Open J16 4-	Durham School	Windsor Boys' School	Reading Blue Coat School
Open J16 4+	Maidstone Invicta / Evesham	George Watson's College	Durham
Open J16 4x	Marlow	York City	Peterborough City
Open J15 1x	Peterborough City	Norwich	Tideway Scullers School
Open J15 2x	Maidstone Invicta	Dart Totnes	Clydesdale
Open J15 4x+	Dulwich College / Tideway Scullers School	Grange School	Wallingford
Open J14 1x	Burway	Stoke RA	Maidenhead
Open J14 2x	Reading	Nottingham	Cardiff City
Open J14 4x+	Maidenhead	Windsor Boys' School	Wycliffe Sculling Centre
Women J18 1x	Burway	Tyne	Henley
Women J18 2-	Marlow	George Heriot's School	Kingston Grammar School
Women J18 2x	Maidenhead	Lea	Nottingham
Women J18 4-	City of Oxford	Aberdeen Schools	Molesey
Women J18 4x	Canford School / Henley / Sir William Borlase	Strathclyde Park	Haberdasher's Monmouth Girls / Marlow / Yarm School
Women J18 4+	Lady Eleanor Holles School	George Heriot's School	Haberdasher's Monmouth Girls / Avon County
Women J18 8+	Maidenhead / Rob Roy	Lady Eleanor Holles School	Haberdasher's Monmouth Girls / Avon County
Women J16 1x	City of Oxford	Lea	Evesham
Women J16 2x	Sir William Borlase	Maidenhead	Strathclyde Park
Women J16 4+	Aberdeen Schools	Lady Eleanor Holles School	City of Oxford
Women J16 4x	Henley	Sir William Borlase	Glasgow Academy / Strathclyde Park
Women J15 1x	Runcorn	Nithsdale	Evesham
Women J15 2x	Maidenhead	Eton Excelsior	Chester-le-Street
Women J15 4x+	Henley	Maidenhead	Queen Elizabeth HS
Women J14 1x	Runcorn	Lea	Tyne
Women J14 2x	City of Oxford	Norwich	Christchurch
Women J14 4x+	Henley	Tees	Stoke RA

Key

Symbol	meaning
1, 2, 4, 8	crew size
+	coxed
-	coxless
x	sculls
14	Under-14
15	Under-15
16	Under-16
J	Junior
