= 2009 British Rowing Championships =

- Venue: National Water Sports Centre
- Location: Holme Pierrepont (Nottingham)
- Dates: 17–19 July 2009

The 2009 British Rowing Championships were the 38th edition of the National Championships, held from 17 to 19 July 2009 at the National Water Sports Centre in Holme Pierrepont, Nottingham. They were organised and sanctioned by British Rowing, and are open to British rowers.

== Senior ==
=== Medal summary ===
| Event | Gold | Silver | Bronze |
|---|---|---|---|
| Open 1x | London; Remco De Keizer | Clyde; James Murphy | Dart Totnes; Elliot Barton |
| Open 2- | Leander; Colin Williamson, George M Laughton | Cardiff City / Leander; D J Donaghy, Robin Dowell | Tideway Scullers School; Robert Irving, Nathan O Reilly |
| Open 2x | Nottingham / Reading University; Dave Marshall, Benjamin Johnson | Agecroft; Peter Warman, Brendan Crean | Tideway Scullers School; Richard Twyman, Charles Clarke |
| Open 4- | Leander; Alan Sinclair, George M Laughton, Colin Williamson, Richard Francis | Star Club; Christopher Callow, Edward Porteus, J Grant-Jones, Will Eason | Imperial College; Joshua Butler, Henry Goodier, Claudio Petrillo, Andrea Palmisano |
| Open 4x | Leander; Jack Hockley, Phil Turnham, David Read, Robin Dowell | Tideway Scullers School; Toby Lonergan, Richard Twyman, Gareth Sharpe, Charles Clarke | Newcastle University; Mark Bowers, Jakub Zof, E Ford, Andrew Corrigan |
| Open 4+ | Leander; Christine Fox, David Read, Robin Dowell, Clive Kennedy-Burn, Nick Clark | Henley; T J R Millward, Roger Ewing, James Watson, James John Padmore, Michael Ewing | Newcastle University; Rebecca Palmer, William Hilder, Andrew Corrigan, Jakub Zof, E Ford |
| Open 8+ | Leander; Christine Fox, Alan Sinclair, Phil Turnham, Charles Pitt Ford, Nick Clark, Clive Kennedy-Burn, George M Laughton, Colin Williamson, Richard Francis | Molesey; Madelaine Eldridge, Ben Pugh, John D G Moon, Frazer Brent, David Lambourn, A Cordey, Daniel Safdari, Henry Ellender, Pete Robinson | Agecroft / Nottingham & Union; Lynne Braid, Peter Warman, J L D Woolley, S R O Neill, Graeme Coleman, Chris Unwin, Craig Morgan, Tommy Dawson, Simon Charles |
| Women 1x | Nottingham; Lindsay Morton | Minerva Bath; Lucy Ryvar | Molesey; Lucy Walczak |
| Women 2x | Leander; Frances Nicholls, Debbie Flood | Henley; Bethan Thomas, Rachel Willis | Rob Roy / Cambridge University WBC; Jennifer Hawton, Anna Railton |
| Women 2- | Headington School; Georgia Howard-Merrill, Fiona Gammond | Edinburgh University; Jen Reid, Polly Swann | Lea; Rachel Palmer, Amanda Benson-Skailes |
| Women 4x | Minerva Bath; Anna Davidson, Lucy Ryvar, Erica Bodman, Helen Glover | Maidenhead / Haberdasher's Monmouth Girls / Henley / Molesey; Pip Christie, Alice Ancora, Pippa Whittaker, Hannah Waltham-Hier | Mortlake Anglian & Alpha; Rachel Hutchinson, Chloe Aitken, Francesca Sanjana, Rebecca Curley |
| Women 4- | Lady Eleanor Holles School / Evesham / St Neots; Bethany Astell, Yasmin Tredell, Lauren Bruce, Katie Clare | Agecroft; Tanya Taylor, Lydia Birch, Charlotte Thompson, Rosy Klinkenberg | Cardiff University; Emily Blanche Walke Parry, Catriona Kay, Bethan Smith, Emma Cockcroft |
| Women 4+ | City of Oxford A Clare Major, Keren Ward, Anna Reid, Zoe Lundy, Andrew Baker (cox) | Stratford-upon-Avon; Jennifer Smith, Helen Ferguson, Suzanne Vance, Lorraine O Hare, Megan Johnston | City of Oxford B Suzanna Drohan, H Partington, Sian Findlay, Ingrid Gjorv, Laura Burgoine |
| Women 8+ | Lady Eleanor Holles School / Henley / Headington School / Dame Alice Harpur / Evesham / St Neots; L Van Den Broecke, Yasmin Tredell, Bethany Astell, Fiona Gammond, Georgia Howard-Merrill, Pippa Whittaker, Holly Cook, K Parrish, Lauren Bruce | Clyde / Glasgow University / Glasgow / Aberdeen; Marianne Flynn, Gillian Toal, Caitie Gorton-Phillips, Amanda Larcombe, Lorna Logan, Jen Reid, Polly Swann, Stephanie Mcdowall, Imogen Walsh | Imperial College / Tideway Scullers School; J Behan, Rachael Davies, Erica Lucy Thompson, Rosanna Smith, Kate Grose, Elizabeth Stutters, Rhona Maccallum, Lindsay Muir, F Barton |

== Lightweight ==
=== Medal summary ===
| Event | Gold | Silver | Bronze |
|---|---|---|---|
| Open L1x | Leander | Durham University | Henley |
| Open L2x | Durham School / Reading University | Marlow | Bexhill |
| Open L2- | Glasgow | Henley | Aberdeen |
| Open L4- | Glasgow | London | Durham University |
| Open L4x | Birmingham University | Trent / Star Club / Sudbury / Worcester | London / Molesey / Nephthys |
| Women L1x | Clyde | Thames | Nottingham |
| Women L2x | Mortlake Anglian & Alpha | Strathclyde Park | Kingston |
| Women L2- | Mortlake Anglian & Alpha | Strathclyde Park | Clyde |
| Women L4x | Mortlake Anglian & Alpha | Kingston | Strathclyde Park |
| Women L4- | Molesey | Mortlake Anglian & Alpha | Putney Town |

== U 23 ==
=== Medal summary ===
| Event | Gold | Silver | Bronze |
|---|---|---|---|
| Open 1x | Reading University | Tideway Scullers School; Tobias Lonergan | Leicester; Jonathon Walton |
| Open 2x | Newcastle University | Cardiff University / Durham University | Clydesdale |
| Women 1x | Newcastle University | Minerva Bath | Aberdeen University |
| Women 2x | Bath University | Henley | Newcastle University |

== Junior ==
=== Medal summary ===
| Event | Gold | Silver | Bronze |
|---|---|---|---|
| Open J18 1x | Leicester | Hollingworth Lake | Glasgow Schools |
| Open J18 2- | Maidstone Invicta | Shiplake College / George Watson's | Maidenhead |
| Open J18 2x | Evesham / Hollingworth Lake | Warrington | Marlow / Merchant Taylors' Girls School |
| Open J18 4- | Maidstone Invicta | Durham | Bewdley |
| Open J18 4x | Magdalen College School / Leicester | Windsor Boys' | Clydesdale |
| Open J18 4+ | Llandaff / Monmouth School / Shrewsbury School | Maidstone Invicta | Tees / Chester-le-Street |
| Open J17 1x | Maidenhead | Glasgow Schools | Star Club |
| Open J16 1x | Peterborough City | Exeter | Lea |
| Open J16 2- | Hampton School | Shiplake College | Queen Elizabeth HS |
| Open J16 2x | Calpe | Runcorn | Yarm School |
| Open J16 4- | St George's College / Walton | Henley | Durham School / Talkin Tarn |
| Open J16 4+ | Henley | Queen Elizabeth HS | Yarm School |
| Open J16 4x | Windsor Boys' | Star Club | Henley |
| Open J15 1x | Maidenhead | Trentham | Windsor Boys' |
| Open J15 2x | Newark | Nottingham | Maidstone Invicta |
| Open J15 4x+ | Hampton School | Windsor Boys' | Yarm School |
| Open J14 1x | Nottingham | City of Oxford | George Watson's |
| Open J14 2x | Stratford-upon-Avon | Nottingham | Dart Totnes |
| Open J14 4x+ | Nottingham | Windsor Boys' B | Windsor Boys' A |
| Women J18 1x | Tideway Scullers School | Maidenhead | Tees |
| Women J18 2- | Agecroft | Durham / St Peter's School | St Neots |
| Women J18 2x | Nottingham | Henley | Agecroft / Hollingworth Lake |
| Women J18 4- | Stratford-upon-Avon / Evesham / Gloucester | City of Oxford | Maidenhead / Burway |
| Women J18 4x | Lea / Barn Elms | Strathclyde Park / Glasgow Schools | Marlow / St Neots |
| Women J18 4+ | Aberdeen Schools | Stratford-upon-Avon / Gloucester | Lady Eleanor Holles School |
| Women J18 8+ | Monmouth Comprehensive School / Kingston Grammar School / Haberdasher's Monmouth Girls / Llandaff / Avon County | Lady Eleanor Holles School | N/A |
| Women J17 1x | Nottingham | William Borlase | Clydesdale |
| Women J16 1x | Queen Elizabeth HS | Christchurch | Putney High School |
| Women J16 2x | Maidenhead | City of Oxford | Rob Roy |
| Women J16 4+ | Lady Eleanor Holles School | William Borlase | Maidenhead |
| Women J16 4x | Star Club | Maidenhead | Nottingham |
| Women J15 1x | Nottingham | Runcorn | Canford School |
| Women J15 2x | Nottingham | Christchurch | Warrington |
| Women J15 4x+ | Henley | Trentham | Tideway Scullers School |
| Women J14 1x | Hollingworth Lake | Peterborough City | Tees |
| Women J14 2x | Norwich | Eton Excelsior | Nottingham |
| Women J14 4x+ | Trentham | Henley | Inverness / Castle Semple |

Key

| Symbol | meaning |
|---|---|
| 1, 2, 4, 8 | crew size |
| + | coxed |
| - | coxless |
| x | sculls |
| 14 | Under-14 |
| 15 | Under-15 |
| 16 | Under-16 |
| J | Junior |
