= 2011 British Rowing Championships =

- Venue: National Water Sports Centre
- Location: Holme Pierrepont (Nottingham)
- Dates: 15–17 July 2011

The 2011 British Rowing Championships were the 40th edition of the National Championships, held from 15 to 17 July 2011 at the National Water Sports Centre in Holme Pierrepont, Nottingham. They were organised and sanctioned by British Rowing, and are open to British rowers.

== Senior ==
=== Medal summary ===
| Event | Gold | Silver | Bronze |
|---|---|---|---|
| Open 1x | Agecroft; Brendan Crean | Star Club; L Taylor | Durham University; Angus Groom |
| Open 2- | Oxford Brookes University; Mason Durant & Frederick Gill | Molesey; Ben Smith & Dan Ouseley | Aberdeen; Colin Wallace & Scott Purdie |
| Open 2x | Molesey / Agecroft; Henry Pelly & Graeme Thomas | Cardiff City / Dart Totnes; Elliot Barton & Andrew Wynne Davies | Walton; S Knight & S Wilson |
| Open 4- | Nottingham; Matt Ley, Rob Yates, Matt Gotrel, Richard Watton | Durham University; Stu McCluskey, Callum McBrierty, Stephen Jones, John Ford | London; Richard Dunley, Alex Cawthorne, Mark Aldred, David Loveday |
| Open 4x | Leander; Tom Wilkinson, James Padmore, James Orme, David Lambourn | Maidstone Invicta; Sam Blackwell, Craig Turner, Chris Mollison, Matt Nicholls | Royal Chester / Runcorn; Scott Wallace, C Thomas, Alistair Hudson, Sam Edwards |
| Open 4+ | Molesey; Lake Friedman, Pete Robinson, Philip Williams, Jonathan Rankin, Rowley Douglas (cox) | Leander; Ben McSweeney, Edward Whiteley, Stephen Tuck, Thomas Harvey, Alex Olijnyk (cox) | Newcastle University; Tim Clarke, Sean Dixon, Ed Ford, Murray Wilkojc, Charles Barry (cox) |
| Open 8+ | Leander; James John Padmore, Ben McSweeney, Ray Poulter, Stephen Tuck, Edward Whiteley, David Read, David Lambourn, Thomas Harvey, Hope Klavenes (cox) | Bedford Modern School / Star Club; Miller, Robertson, Glasspool, Edwards, Powell, Kempsell, Porteus, Eason, Williams Cartwright | Stratford-upon-Avon / City of Oxford; Robert Gittus-Smith, A W Platt, Meikle, Fryer, Barnwell, Balch, Hounsell, Kingham, Henry Drohan |
| Women 1x | Mortlake Anglian & Alpha; Francesca Sanjana | Leeds; Kristine Johnson | Sport Imperial; Mathilde Pauls |
| Women 2x | Nottingham; Fiona Bassett & Lindsay Marshall | Thames / Tideway Scullers School; Sophie Theodorou & C M Thomas | Curlew; Emma Dyson & Lizzie Chapman |
| Women 2- | City of Oxford; Keren Ward & Nicola Smith | Molesey; Elly Blackwell & A Elliott | Llandaff / City of Oxford; Cloudy Carnegie & Hannah Patterson |
| Women 4x | Nottingham; Lindsay Marshall, Fiona Bassett, Catherine Lineker, Nikki Spencer | Deben / Mersey / Rob Roy / Tees; Clio Aubugeau-Williams, Charlotte Drury, Bethany Bryan, Ellen Thomas | Clydesdale / Bath University; Nicki Godbold, R Young, Samantha Fowler, Gabriella Rodriguez |
| Women 4- | William Borlase / St Paul's Girls' School; Maxie Scheske, Ellie Lewis, Thea Vukasinovic, Louisa Bolton | Aberdeen; Lucy Bonnamy, Iona Riley, Catriona Bain, Jamie Steel | Newcastle University; Abby Johnston, Minna Jones-Walters, Ami Hodges, Lauren Clark |
| Women 4+ | City of Oxford; Jane Loveday, Sian Findlay, Keren Ward, Nicola Smith, Dave Locke (cox) | Agecroft; D Yarrow, J Russell, J Eve Smith, Danielle Hardy, S Mottram | Marlow; Anna Brazinova, Hannah Cumming, Tamsin McAllister, Ruth Naylor, Lisa Knill |
| Women 8+ | Henley / Reading University B Victoria Tomalin, Jenny Cogger, Lydia Jackson, Alice Bentley, Bethan Thomas, Emma Spruce, Jenny Spencer, A Brooks, Rhiannon Jones (cox) | William Borlase / St Paul's Girls' School / City of Oxford / Lady Eleanor Holles School / Tees / Deben / Llandaff; Ellie Lewis, Clio Aubugeau-Williams, Bryan, Louisa Bolton, Maxie Scheske, Thea Vukasinovic, Hannah Patterson, Cloudy Carnegie, Morgan Baynham-Williams (cox) | Molesey; Soulsby, Sophie Faldo, Carmen Failla, Ruth Walczak, Marshall, Catie Sharrod, Elly Blackwell, Elliott, Helen Arbuthnot (cox) |

== Lightweight ==
=== Medal summary ===
| Event | Gold | Silver | Bronze |
|---|---|---|---|
| Open L1x | Gloucester | Eton Excelsior | Dart Totnes |
| Open L2x | London / Isis | Henley / Eton Excelsior | Upper Thames |
| Open L2- | Worcester | Newcastle University | Thames Valley Park |
| Open L4- | Newcastle University | Lea | N/A |
| Open L4x | Tideway Scullers School | Univ of West of England | London University |
| Women L1x | Molesey | Nottingham | Isle of Ely |
| Women L2x | Mortlake Anglian & Alpha A | Bewl Bridge / Ardingly | Mortlake Anglian & Alpha B |
| Women L2- | Aberdeen | Mortlake Anglian & Alpha A | Mortlake Anglian & Alpha B |
| Women L4x | Mortlake Anglian & Alpha | Marlow / Abingdon / Oxford Academy | Marlow |
| Women L4- | Mortlake Anglian & Alpha | Marlow | Worcester |

== U 23 ==
=== Medal summary ===
| Event | Gold | Silver | Bronze |
|---|---|---|---|
| Open 1x | Isle of Ely | Durham University | Reading University |
| Open 2x | Newcastle University | Runcorn / Imperial College | Cardiff University |
| Women 1x | Nottingham | Agecroft | Bath University |
| Women 2x | Bath University | Runcorn / Dart Totnes | Durham |

== Junior ==
=== Medal summary ===
| Event | Gold | Silver | Bronze |
|---|---|---|---|
| Open J18 1x | Tideway Scullers School | Peterborough City | Trent |
| Open J18 2- | Glasgow Academy | Norwich | Rhwyfo Cymru |
| Open J18 2x | Walton | Rhwyfo Cymru | William Borlase |
| Open J18 4- | Abingdon School / Hampton School / Maidstone Invicta | Rhwyfo Cymru | Yarm School |
| Open J18 4x | Peterborough City | Star Club | Grange School / Royal Chester / Runcorn |
| Open J18 4+ | Rhwyfo Cymru | Evesham | George Watson's College |
| Open J17 1x | Poplar | Isle of Ely | Thames |
| Open J16 1x | Aberdeen Schools | Runcorn | Stratford-upon-Avon |
| Open J16 2- | Aberdeen Schools | Rhwyfo Cymru | Windsor Boys' |
| Open J16 2x | Walton | Maidenhead / Claires Court | Agecroft |
| Open J16 4- | Walton | Windsor Boys' | William Borlase |
| Open J16 4x | Marlow | Upper Thames | Monmouth Comprehensive School |
| Open J15 1x | Bedford | Grange School | Calpe |
| Open J15 2x | Nottingham | Pangbourne College | Evesham |
| Open J15 4x+ | Windsor Boys' | Pangbourne College | Bristol / Gloucester / Pangbourne College |
| Open J14 1x | Nottingham | Grange School | William Borlase |
| Open J14 2x | Newark | Marlow | Trentham |
| Open J14 4x+ | William Borlase | Queens Park High School | Trentham |
| Women J18 1x | Kingsley School | Exeter | Evesham |
| Women J18 2- | Calpe | William Borlase | Durham School |
| Women J18 2x | William Borlase | Eton Excelsior / Marlow | Boston RC / Derby |
| Women J18 4- | Aberdeen Schools | Trentham | Lady Eleanor Holles School |
| Women J18 4x | Henley | Gloucester | Dame Alice Harpur / Bedford High School |
| Women J18 4+ | Lady Eleanor Holles School | Aberdeen Schools | George Watson's College |
| Women J18 8+ | Henley | Lady Eleanor Holles School | Glasgow Academy / George Heriot's School / George Watson's College |
| Women J17 1x | Cambois | Broxbourne | Globe |
| Women J16 1x | Eton Excelsior | Norwich | Castle Semple |
| Women J16 2x | Grange School / Warrington | Norwich | Nottingham / Trent |
| Women J16 4+ | William Borlase | Aberdeen Schools | Trentham |
| Women J16 4x | Henley | Peterborough City | William Borlase |
| Women J15 1x | Wallingford | Warrington | Nottingham |
| Women J15 2x | Bedford High School | Bedford | Great Marlow School |
| Women J15 4x+ | Eton Excelsior | Wallingford / City of Oxford | Henley |
| Women J14 1x | Nottingham | Christchurch | Hollingworth Lake |
| Women J14 2x | Tideway Scullers School | Trent | Dart Totnes |
| Women J14 4x+ | Marlow A | Marlow B | Maidenhead |

| Symbol | meaning |
|---|---|
| 1, 2, 4, 8 | crew size |
| + | coxed |
| - | coxless |
| x | sculls |
| 14 | Under-14 |
| 15 | Under-15 |
| 16 | Under-16 |
| J | Junior |
