= 2014 British Rowing Junior Championships =

British rowing event

- Venue: National Water Sports Centre
- Location: Holme Pierrepont (Nottingham)
- Dates: 19–20 July 2014

The 2014 British Rowing Junior Championships were the 43rd edition of the National Junior Championships, held from 19–20 July 2014 at the National Water Sports Centre in Holme Pierrepont, Nottingham. They were organised and sanctioned by British Rowing, and are open to British junior rowers.

== Medal summary ==
Event	Gold	Silver	Bronze
Victor Ludorum	Henley	n/a	n/a
Open J18 1x	Leander A	Leander B	Northwich
Open J18 2-	Tideway Scullers School	Calpe	London / Marlow
Open J18 2x	Newark / Thames	St Leonard's School	St Neots
Open J18 4-	Nautilus	Glasgow Academy	Aberdeen Schools
Open J18 4x	Northwich	Leander	Warrington
Open J18 8+	Durham	King's Canterbury	Kingston Grammar School
Open J16 1x	Glasgow Academy	Clydesdale	Nottingham
Open J16 2-	Aberdeen Schools	Falcon	Maidstone Invicta
Open J16 2x	Maidenhead	York City	Bideford AAC / Bideford ARC
Open J16 4+	Aberdeen Schools	Kingston Grammar School	Cambois
Open J16 4x	RGS High Wycombe	Leander / Nottingham	Burton Leander
Open J15 1x	Tideway Scullers School	Clydesdale	Northwich
Open J15 2x	Shiplake Vikings	City of Oxford	Wallingford
Open J15 4x+	Claires Court	George Watson's	Marlow
Open J14 1x	Maidenhead	Reading	Sudbury
Open J14 2x	RGS High Wycombe	Stourport	Star Club
Open J14 4x+	Calpe	Windsor Boys'	Walton
Women J18 1x	Runcorn	Eton Excelsior A	Eton Excelsior C
Women J18 2-	Tyne	Cantabrigian	Cambois
Women J18 2x	Bedford Girls'	Tideway Scullers School	Wallingford
Women J18 4x	Maidenhead / St Andrew / George Watson's	Eton Excelsior	Weybridge
Women J18 4-	Henley	Glasgow Academy	Aberdeen Schools
Women J18 8+	Henley	Lady Eleanor Holles School / Kingston Grammar School	Hollowell composite
Women J16 1x	Tideway Scullers School	York City	Marlow
Women J16 2-	Walton	Lady Eleanor Holles School	Eton Excelsior
Women J16 2x	George Watson's	Tideway Scullers School	Nottingham
Women J16 4+	Queen Elizabeth HS	Glasgow Academy / George Watson's	Bedford Girls'
Women J16 4x	Henley	Warrington	Hollingworth Lake / Liverpool Victoria
Women J15 1x	Warrington	Christchurch	Pengwern
Women J15 2x	Globe	City of Oxford	St Neots
Women J15 4x+	Henley A	Henley B	Lea
Women J14 1x	Chester-le-Street	Burton Leander	Norwich
Women J14 2x	Avon County	Maidenhead	Marlow
Women J14 4x+	Henley	Maidenhead	Ross

Key
Symbol	meaning
1, 2, 4, 8	crew size
+	coxed
-	coxless
x	sculls
14	Under-14
15	Under-15
16	Under-16
18	Under-18
