= 2007 British Rowing Championships =

- Venue: National Water Sports Centre
- Location: Holme Pierrepont (Nottingham)
- Dates: 20–22 July 2007

The 2007 British Rowing Championships were the 36th edition of the National Championships, held from 20–22 July 2007 at the National Water Sports Centre in Holme Pierrepont, Nottingham. They were organised and sanctioned by British Rowing, and are open to British rowers.

== Senior ==
=== Medal summary ===
| Event | Gold | Silver | Bronze |
|---|---|---|---|
| Open 1x | Agecroft; Brendan Crean | Reading University; Dan Ritchie | Burton Leander; Ashley Prestidge |
| Open 2- | Leander; Tom Burton & Charlie Palmer | Newcastle University; Mason Durant & Fred Gill | Tideway Scullers School / London; R Hardy & T M Johnstone |
| Open 2x | Tideway Scullers School; James Dunley & Mike Hennessy | Newcastle University; Richard Francis & Henry Pelly | London; M Bell & Oliver Mahony |
| Open 4- | Reading University; C M Carew, Robin Dowell, Phil Turnham, Bradley Whale | Molesey; E A Boyns, B John Curtis, J Mcnuff, Scott Rennie | London; M M Coughlan, I Cowell, B Donald Hudson, Tom Killick |
| Open 4x | Tideway Scullers School; Graham Benton, Lucas Dalglish, James Dunley, Mike Hennessy | City of Oxford; N Challinor Halford, T Leach, P Meikle, S A Salter | Newcastle University; Andrew Corrigan, Dan Cupit, S Horrell, Will Reid |
| Open 4+ | Leander A Andy Ardron, E G Barry, Charlie Brereton, Clive Kennedy-Burn, S E Richards | Leander B R J Ainley, M Roger Ewing, A Gaspar, K Harry, C Fox | Grosvenor; S Callaghan, M R Chandler, I Jones, N Lloyd, S J Armstrong |
| Open 8+ | Leander; R Ardron, G Barry, Robert Brereton, F Burton, W A Dax, Kennedy-Burn, Palmer, Williamson, E Richards | Agecroft; Benson, P M Beresford, William Charles, J Hetherington, Morgan, J Y Parsons, J Sullivan, J Vickers, Coutts | Tideway Scullers School; D Allen, N Arbeid, Graham Benton, Lucas Dalglish, C Marshall, Sharpe, G Suthers, Twyman, Taylor |
| Women 1x | Reading University; Jo Lyons | Nottingham; Jacqui Round | Clydesdale; Fran Jacob |
| Women 2x | Leander; Rachel Loveridge & Louisa Rowbotham | Tideway Scullers School; Andrea Finn & Elaine Johnstone | Newcastle University; Alice Leake & Lisa Thomasson |
| Women 2- | Nottingham / Durham University; Ros Collings & Hannah Elsy | London University; L R A Muir & E Young | Mortlake Anglian & Alpha; Tracey Matthews & Tash Smith |
| Women 4x | Tideway Scullers School / Mortlake Anglian & Alpha; Andrea Finn, Elaine Johnstone, Melissa Sage, Anna Townsend | Maidenhead / Bedford / King's School Canterbury; Sphie Delaney, H Moon, Olivia Oakes, Emily Piggott | Reading / Upper Thames / Marlow; Helen Ralston, Athalie Redwood-Brown, Rebecca Sadler, Natalia Wase |
| Women 4- | City of Oxford; Rachel Luxton, Clare Major, Becky Slater, Elizabeth Southey | Nautilus; Charlotte Irving, Christianne Van Besouw, Michelle Vezie, Chloe Willis | Wallingford; R Elmes, Bea Longworth, A R Mills, J Philcox |
| Women 4+ | Thames; J Chichester, C Greenhalgh, H Ratcliff, Florence Temple, O C L Cook | Oxford Brookes University / Osiris; Tamsin Adams, Isabella Lindholt, Andrea Pauli, Deborah Turner, P Yu | Birmingham University; N Bartlett, K Perry, R Turner, H Wood, Larissa Matley |
| Women 8+ | Oxford Brookes University / Osiris; Tamsin Adams, Rose Bosnell, Alexandra Cairns, Isabella Lindholt, Andrea Pauli, Deborah Turner, Amelia Van Manen, Emma Windham, P Yu | Furnivall SC / Auriol Kensington / Upper Thames; L Brown, O Bulmer, R Buxton, A Currie, Gill, H Hagon, A Hawkins, Abigail Sander, L Wallace | Reading; Alder, Dickinson, Hynes, Pollok-Morris, Adele Radley, E Riley, Roberts, Waterfall, Wakely |

== Lightweight ==
=== Medal summary ===
| Event | Gold | Silver | Bronze |
|---|---|---|---|
| Open L1x | Durham University | Windsor Boys' School | Upper Thames |
| Open L2x | London | St Andrew / George Watson's College | Marlow |
| Open L2- | Leander | London | Strathclyde Park / Castle Semple |
| Open L4- | Nottingham | London | Mortlake Anglian & Alpha / Quintin |
| Open L4x | Upper Thames | Nottingham | Tideway Scullers School |
| Women L1x | Mortlake Anglian & Alpha | Vesta | Tideway Scullers School |
| Women L2x | Mortlake Anglian & Alpha | Maidenhead | London |
| Women L2- | Mortlake Anglian & Alpha | Mortlake Anglian & Alpha / Thames | Kingston |
| Women L4x | Tideway Scullers School | Mortlake Anglian & Alpha | Oxford University / Wallingford |
| Women L4- | Mortlake Anglian & Alpha | Reading | N/A |

== Coastal ==
=== Medal summary ===
| Event | Gold | Silver | Bronze |
|---|---|---|---|
| Open 1x | Ryde | Itchen Imperial B | Itchen Imperial A |
| Open 4+ | Ryde A | BTC (Southampton) | Ryde B |

== U 23 ==
=== Medal summary ===
| Event | Gold | Silver | Bronze |
|---|---|---|---|
| Open 1x | Leander | Cardiff City | Itchen Imperial |
| Open 2x | Calpe | Reading University | Upper Thames |
| Women 1x | Upper Thames | Maidenhead | Reading |
| Women 2x | Newcastle University | Tideway Scullers School | Upper Thames |

== Junior ==
=== Medal summary ===
| Event | Gold | Silver | Bronze |
|---|---|---|---|
| Open J18 1x | Windsor Boys' School | Nottingham | Sir William Borlase |
| Open J18 2- | Tyne | Strathclyde Park | Henley / Pangbourne College |
| Open J18 2x | Marlow | Windsor Boys' School | George Watson's College |
| Open J18 4- | Tyne | Bedford Modern School | Rebecca / Monmouth School |
| Open J18 4x | Windsor Boys' School | Wallingford / Magdalen College School | Star Club / Peterborough City |
| Open J18 4+ | Rebecca / Kingston Grammar School / Monmouth School | Bedford Modern School | RGS Worcester |
| Open J16 1x | Cambridge '99 | Windsor Boys' School | Magdalen College School |
| Open J16 2- | Maidstone Invicta | Maidenhead | Durham School |
| Open J16 2x | Maidenhead | York City | Nottingham |
| Open J16 4+ | Evesham | Maidenhead / Maidstone Invicta | Bedford School |
| Open J16 4x | Evesham | Sir William Borlase | Star Club |
| Open J15 1x | Peterborough City | St Ives | Castle Semple |
| Open J15 2x | Castle Semple / George Watson's College | Tideway Scullers School | Marlow |
| Open J15 4x+ | Tiffin School / Tideway Scullers School | George Watson's College | Yarm School |
| Open J14 1x | Peterborough City | King's School Canterbury | Claires Court School |
| Open J14 2x | Maidstone Invicta | Gloucester | Peterborough City |
| Open J14 4x+ | Windsor Boys' School | Wallingford | Queen Elizabeth HS |
| Women J18 1x | Rob Roy | Dart Totnes | Headington School |
| Women J18 2- | Headington School | Reading | Talkin Tarn |
| Women J18 2x | Maidenhead / Hollingworth Lake | Marlow | Sir William Borlase |
| Women J18 4- | Molesey | Henley | St.Peters School |
| Women J18 4x | Marlow | Reading | Star Club |
| Women J18 4+ | Aberdeen Schools | George Heriot's School | Stratford-upon-Avon |
| Women J18 8+ | George Heriot's School | Maidenhead / Henley | Haberdasher's Monmouth Girls |
| Women J16 1x | Durham ARC | RGS Worcester | Canford School |
| Women J16 2x | Marlow | Eton Excelsior | Agecroft |
| Women J16 4+ | Lady Eleanor Holles School | Aberdeen Schools | King's School Worcester |
| Women J16 4x | Strathclyde Park / Loch Lomond | Maidenhead / Henley | Sir William Perkins's / Staines |
| Women J15 1x | Yarm School | Abingdon | Merchant Taylors' Girls School |
| Women J15 2x | St Neots | Sir William Borlase | Strathclyde Park |
| Women J15 4x+ | Maidenhead / Walton | St Neots | City of Oxford |
| Women J14 1x | Runcorn | Tyne | Evesham |
| Women J14 2x | Maidenhead | City of Oxford | Castle Semple / Nithsdale |
| Women J14 4x+ | Stoke RA | Maidenhead | Queen Elizabeth HS |

Key

| Symbol | meaning |
|---|---|
| 1, 2, 4, 8 | crew size |
| + | coxed |
| - | coxless |
| x | sculls |
| 14 | Under-14 |
| 15 | Under-15 |
| 16 | Under-16 |
| J | Junior |
