= 2013 British Rowing Junior Championships =

British rowing event

- Venue: National Water Sports Centre
- Location: Holme Pierrepont (Nottingham)
- Dates: 20–21 July 2013

The 2013 British Rowing Junior Championships were the 42nd edition of the National Junior Championships, held from 20 to 21 July 2013 at the National Water Sports Centre in Holme Pierrepont, Nottingham. They were organised and sanctioned by British Rowing, and are open to British junior rowers.

== Medal summary ==
Event	Gold	Silver	Bronze
Victor Ludorum	Aberdeen Schools	n/a	n/a
Open J18 1x	Derby	BTC (Southampton)	Windsor Boys'
Open J18 2-	Mediterranean	Evesham	Edinburgh University
Open J18 2x	Nottingham	Evesham	Walton
Open J18 4-	Aberdeen Schools	Great Marlow School	Calpe
Open J18 4x	Maidenhead	Northwich	Gloucester Hartpury / Wycliffe
Open J16 1x	Grange School	Evesham	Star & Arrow Club
Open J16 2-	Evesham	Royal Chester	Tideway Scullers School
Open J16 2x	St Neots	Clydesdale	Tideway Scullers School
Open J16 4+	George Watson's College	Aberdeen Schools B	Aberdeen Schools A
Open J16 4x	Tideway Scullers School	Claires Court	Lea / Globe / Thames
Open J15 1x	Nottingham	Trentham	Royal Chester
Open J15 2x	Maidenhead	York City	Bideford AAC / Bideford ARC
Open J15 4x+	Claires Court	Windsor Boys'	Wallingford
Open J14 1x	Clydesdale	Durham	Trafford
Open J14 2x	Runcorn	City of Oxford	Doncaster Schools
Open J14 4x+	Trentham	Claires Court	Shiplake College
Women J18 1x	Eton Excelsior	Gloucester Hartpury	Glasgow University
Women J18 2-	Pangbourne College	Haberdasher's Monmouth Girls	Kingston Grammar School
Women J18 2x	Evesham	Gloucester Hartpury	Warrington
Women J18 4x	Gloucester Hartpury	Marlow / Eton Excelsior	Kingston Grammar School
Women J18 4-	Aberdeen Schools	Great Marlow School	Marlow
Women J16 1x	Monmouth Comprehensive School	Nottingham	Eton Excelsior
Women J16 2x	City of Oxford	Glasgow	Eton Excelsior
Women J16 4+	Queen Elizabeth HS	Aberdeen Schools	Eton Excelsior
Women J16 4x	Marlow	Walton	York City
Women J15 1x	York City	Surbiton High School	Stratford-upon-Avon
Women J15 2x	Surbiton High School	York City	Warrington
Women J15 4x+	Henley	Queen Elizabeth HS	Trent
Women J14 1x	Warrington	City of Oxford	Calpe
Women J14 2x	Glasgow Academy	St Neots	Globe
Women J14 4x+	Ross	Avon County	Henley

Key
Symbol	meaning
1, 2, 4, 8	crew size
+	coxed
-	coxless
x	sculls
14	Under-14
15	Under-15
16	Under-16
18	Under-18
