= 2018 British Rowing Junior Championships =

British rowing event

- Venue: National Water Sports Centre
- Location: Holme Pierrepont (Nottingham)
- Dates: 20–22 July 2018

The 2018 British Rowing Junior Championships were the 47th edition of the National Junior Championships, held from 20–22 July 2018 at the National Water Sports Centre in Holme Pierrepont, Nottingham. They were organised and sanctioned by British Rowing, and are open to British junior rowers.

== Medal summary ==
Event	Gold	Silver	Bronze
Victor Ludorum	Henley	n/a	n/a
Open J18 1x	Queen Elizabeth HS	Hollingworth Lake	Tideway Scullers School
Open J18 2-	Henley	Queen Elizabeth HS	Great Marlow School
Open J18 2x	Calpe	Twickenham / Reading	Tideway Scullers School
Open J18 4-	Walton	Great Marlow School	Maidstone Invicta
Open J18 4x	Warrington	Gloucester Hartpury	Leander
Open J18 8+	Gloucester Hartpury	Windsor Boys'	not awarded
Open J16 1x	Rob Roy	Nottingham & Union	Windsor Boys'
Open J16 2-	King's Canterbury	Maidstone Invicta	Walton
Open J16 2x	Globe	Henley	Lea
Open J16 4+	Chester-le-Street	Walton	Aberdeen Schools
Open J16 4x	Claires Court	Tideway Scullers School	Claires Court
Open J15 1x	Trentham	Chester-le-Street	Bewl Bridge
Open J15 2x	Exeter	St Ives	York City
Open J15 4x+	Tideway Scullers School	Aberdeen Schools	Wycliffe Junior
Open J14 4x+	Trentham	Hereford	Maidenhead
Women J18 1x	Agecroft	Warrington	Marlow
Women J18 2-	Lea	Calpe	NCRA
Women J18 2x	NCRA	Nottingham / Thames	York City
Women J18 4x	Sir William Perkins's School	Star Club	Maidenhead
Women J18 4-	Henley	NCRA	Glasgow Academy
Women J18 8+	Henley	Lea	Durham School / King's Canterbury / Maidstone Invicta
Women J16 1x	Leicester	Cambois	Thames
Women J16 2-	Glasgow Academy	Marlow	Sir William Perkins's School
Women J16 2x	Sir William Perkins's School	Marlow	Tideway Scullers School
Women J16 4+	Lea	Stratford-upon-Avon	Great Marlow School
Women J16 4x	Henley	Marlow	Loch Lomond / St Andrew / Clydesdale / George Watson's College
Women J15 1x	St Andrew	Henley	Chester-le-Street
Women J15 2x	Marlow	George Watson's	Isle of Ely / Rob Roy
Women J15 4x+	Marlow	Henley	Trentham
Women J14 4x	Ross	Nottingham & Union	Trentham

Symbol	meaning
1, 2, 4, 8	crew size
+	coxed
-	coxless
x	sculls
14	Under-14
15	Under-15
16	Under-16
18	Under-18
