= 2010 British Rowing Championships =

- Venue: Strathclyde Country Park
- Location: Motherwell, North Lanarkshire
- Dates: 16–18 July 2010

The 2010 British Rowing Championships were the 39th edition of the National Championships, held from 16–18 July 2010 at the Strathclyde Country Park in Motherwell, North Lanarkshire. They were organised and sanctioned by British Rowing, and are open to British rowers.

The 2010 regatta was notable by the very poor turn out by the country's top clubs, especially in the elite men's events. The men's coxed fours had only three entries, two of which withdrew before the final, leaving London Rowing Club to row over. The same crew also won the men's coxless fours, and the men's open eights which was a straight final, where London combined with four members of the clubs lightweight squad.

== Senior ==
=== Medal summary ===
Event	Gold	Silver	Bronze
Open 1x	Isle of Ely; Ben Hicks	Clyde; James Murphy	London; Remco De Keizer
Open 2-	Durham University; Stuart McCluskey & Philip Congdon	Deeside Scullers; Colin Wallace & Scott Purdie	Clydesdale; Andrew McConnell & Christopher Rae
Open 2x	Hertfordshire University / Inverness; Dave Bell & Alan Sinclair	Reading University; John Preston & Dave Marshall	Burway; Barry Gardener & Stephen Hermes
Open 4-	London; Steve O'Connor, Andrew Murray, Matthew Bell, Robert McGow	Nottingham; Richard Watton, Andreas Endruweit, Mark Child, Raymond Hughes	Tees; Kieran Clark, Lee Fisher, Alexander Mack, Chris Boddy
Open 4x	Monmouth / Hereford; Alexander Butler, Tom Alexander Penny, Louis Paterson, James Coombes	Rhwyfo Cymru; Andrew Wynne Davies, David Donaghy, Robin Dowell, Daniel John	Newcastle University; Murray Wilkojc, Mark Bowers, Timothy Clarke, Tom Wright
Open 4+	London; Steve O'Connor, Robert McGow, Matthew Bell, Andrew Murray, Jessica Terrell (cox)	None	None
Open 8+	London; Dominic Wilson, Peter Stuart, Steve O'Connor, Andrew Murray, Matthew Bell, Stuart Heap, Jonathan Bale, Robert McGow, Jessica Terrell (cox)	Nottingham; George McKirdy, Richard Watton, Andreas Endruweit, Robert Yates, Mark Child, Raymond Hughes, Matthew Ley, George Caines, Victoria Atkins (cox)	Newcastle University; Mark Bowers, Andrew Curry, Edward Stephenson, Henry Hilder, Callum Fraser, Edmund MacKenzie, Andrew Hatzis, Artjom Neprjahhin, Joanne Rea (Cox)
Women 1x	Durham University; Emily Taylor	Leeds; Kristine Johnson	Upper Thames; Lucinda Gooderham
Women 2x	Mortlake Anglian & Alpha; Anna Townsend, Ruth Sander	Cambridge University WBC / Reading University; Anna Railton, Erica Bodman	Bedford Modern School / Runcorn; Charlotte Cook, Lucy Burgess
Women 2-	City of Oxford; Keren Ward, Nicola Smith	Aberdeen; Alexandria Gemie, Kate Jones	Nottingham / Trent; Catherine Hurst, Laura Wheeler
Women 4x	Nottingham / Latymer Upper School / Dame Alice Harpur; Kate Parrish, Katie Bartlett, Klara Weaver, Gemma Hall	William Borlase; Jessica Lewis, Hannah Shimmin, Phoebe Lucas, Kate Hewett	Agecroft; Lydia Birch, Rachel Flanders, Charlotte Thompson, Danielle Hardy
Women 4-	Rhwyfo Cymru; Emma Cockcroft, Sophie Crampin, Sophie Leonard, Rebecca Chin	Lady Eleanor Holles School / Durham School / Pangbourne College; Helen Jefferis, Louisa Bolton, Thea Vukasinovic, Nicole Lamb	Clydesdale; Rosie Young, Karen Bennett, Samantha Fowler, Claire McKeown
Women 4+	Reading; J Francis, Sally Pollok-Morris, Heidi Christie, Christina Heemskerk, David Locke	Sons of the Thames; Pippa Blockley, Lyndsay Campbell, Emily Wright, C Hart, James Renwick	City of Oxford; Isabel Unwin, Ingrid Gjorv, Jane Loveday, Sian Findlay, Suzanna Drohan
Women 8+	Lady Eleanor Holles School / Durham School / Tideway Scullers School / Pangbourne / Dame Alice Harpur School / Canford School / NCRA; Helen Jefferis, Louisa Bolton, Kate Parrish, Katie Bartlett, Thea Vukasinovic, Sarah Lonergan, Anastasia Chitty, Nicole Lamb, Charlotte Trundley	City of Oxford; Melanie Ward, Isabel Unwin, Katharina Uhl, Ingrid Gjorv, Jane Loveday, Sian Findlay, Keren Ward, Nicola Smith, Suzanna Drohan	Putney Town; Louise Bartlett, Kelly Thomas, Elizabeth McLoughlin, Julie Lewis, Hayley Cripps, Amelia Smith, Sofia Nilsson, Kate De Bruyn, Christopher Carlson

== Lightweight ==
=== Medal summary ===
Event	Gold	Silver	Bronze
Open L1x	Henley	Tees	London
Open L2x	London	Tideway Scullers School / Upper Thames	Rhwyfo Cymru
Open L2-	London A	London C	London B
Open L4-	London	Broxbourne	Robert Gordon University / Clydesdale
Open L4x	West of England	Tideway Scullers School / Upper Thames	Walton
Women L1x	Strathclyde Park	Monmouth	Llandaff
Women L2x	Mortlake Anglian & Alpha	Nottingham	St Andrew
Women L2-	Strathclyde Park / Aberdeen	Mortlake Anglian & Alpha A	Mortlake Anglian & Alpha B
Women L4x	Mortlake Anglian & Alpha	Marlow	Mortlake Anglian & Alpha / Oxford University WLRC
Women L4-	Mortlake Anglian & Alpha	Marlow	Putney Town

== U 23 ==
=== Medal summary ===
Event	Gold	Silver	Bronze
Open 1x	Reading University	Agecroft	Isle of Ely
Open 2x	Newcastle University	Monmouth / Hereford	Evesham / Hollingworth Lake
Women 1x	Agecroft	Marlow	Bath University
Women 2x	Bedford Modern School / Runcorn	Cambridge University WBC/ Reading University	Bath University

== Junior ==
=== Medal summary ===
Event	Gold	Silver	Bronze
Open J18 1x	Tideway Scullers School	Maidenhead	Runcorn
Open J18 2-	Durham School	Aberdeen Schools	Clydesdale
Open J18 2x	Tideway Scullers School	Trent / Burton Leander	York City
Open J18 4-	Royal Shrewsbury School	Monmouth School	Aberdeen Schools
Open J18 4x	Runcorn	Royal Chester / Queens Park High School	Norwich
Open J18 4+	Royal Shrewsbury School	Monmouth School	Durham
Open J17 1x	Clydesdale	Gloucester	Hollingworth Lake
Open J16 1x	Tideway Scullers School	Stowe	Broxbourne
Open J16 2-	Aberdeen Schools	George Watson's College	William Borlase
Open J16 2x	Tideway Scullers School	Trent / Burton Leander	Norwich
Open J16 4-	William Borlase	Talkin Tarn / Cambois	Durham School / St Peters School / Cambois
Open J16 4+	Evesham	George Watson's College	Windsor Boys'
Open J16 4x	Windsor Boys'	Nottingham	Wycliffe College
Open J15 1x	City of Oxford	Upper Thames	Monmouth Comprehensive School
Open J15 2x	Stratford-upon-Avon	Trentham	Hampton School
Open J15 4x+	Tideway Scullers School / Walton	Windsor Boys'	Hampton School
Open J14 1x	Clydesdale	Grange School	Pangbourne College
Open J14 2x	Walton	Maidenhead	Nottingham
Open J14 4x+	Hampton School	Peterborough City	Windsor Boys'
Women J18 1x	Royal Chester	Nottingham	Merchant Taylors' Girls School
Women J18 2-	Mediterranean	George Heriot's School	City of Oxford
Women J18 2x	William Borlase	Tees	Rhwyfo Cymru
Women J18 4-	City of Oxford	Aberdeen Schools A	Aberdeen Schools B
Women J18 4x	Thames / Lea	Clydesdale	Henley
Women J18 4+	City of Oxford	Maidenhead / Haberdasher's Monmouth Girls / Cardiff	Aberdeen Schools
Women J18 8+	Trentham	Clydesdale	Haberdasher's Monmouth Girls / Cardiff/ Llandaff / Maidenhead
Women J17 1x	Tees	Deben	Evesham
Women J16 1x	William Borlase	Rob Roy	Tideway Scullers School
Women J16 2x	Christchurch	Glasgow / Castle Semple	Mediterranean
Women J16 4+	Trentham	Aberdeen Schools	Haberdasher's Monmouth Girls / Llandaff
Women J16 4x	William Borlase	Nottingham / Tees / Rob Roy	Warrington / Runcorn / Mersey
Women J15 1x	Hollingworth Lake	Eton Excelsior	Castle Semple
Women J15 2x	Warrington	Norwich	Marlow / Nottingham
Women J15 4x+	Henley	Trentham	Eton Excelsior
Women J14 1x	Newark	Henley	Avon County
Women J14 2x	Eton Excelsior	Ross	William Borlase
Women J14 4x+	Henley	City of Bristol	Eton Excelsior

Key

Symbol	meaning
1, 2, 4, 8	crew size
+	coxed
-	coxless
x	sculls
14	Under-14
15	Under-15
16	Under-16
J	Junior
