= 2012 British Rowing Championships =

British rowing event

- Venue: National Water Sports Centre
- Location: Holme Pierrepont (Nottingham)
- Dates: 13–15 July 2012

The 2012 British Rowing Championships were the 41st edition of the National Championships, held from 13–15 July 2012 at the National Water Sports Centre in Holme Pierrepont, Nottingham. They were organised and sanctioned by British Rowing, and are open to British rowers.

== Senior ==
=== Medal summary ===
| Event | Gold | Silver | Bronze |
|---|---|---|---|
| Open 1x | Isle of Ely; Daniel Clift | Henley; Dave Bell | Nottingham; Matt Gotrel |
| Open L1x | Upper Thames; Tom Hope | Cantabrigian; John Hale | Bexhill; Mark Mitchell |
| Open 2- | Oxford Brookes University; Louis Paterson & Alexander Holden-Smith | Upper Thames; Toby Mottram & R J McAllister | Nottingham / Durham University; William Mace & Edward Mace |
| Open L2- | Newcastle University; Matthew Smith & Nick Buckle | Cardiff City; David George & Huw Carrick | Henley; Tom Cannon & Conor Ward |
| Open 4+ | Newcastle University; Alexander Leigh, Tom Ford, Timothy Clarke, Ed Ford, Ruaridh MacPhee | Durham University; John Ford, Barnaby Stentiford, Stephen Jones, Daniel Boddington, Franz Imfeld | Tideway Scullers School; Adam Lodygowski, Thomas Wheeler, Murray Wilkojc, Nathan O'Reilly, Zoe Davies |
| Women 1x | Nottingham; Pippa Whittaker | Sport Imperial; Mathilde Pauls | Molesey; Karen Bennett |
| Women L1x | Isle of Ely; Elizabeth Polgreen | Nottingham; Nicola Spencer | Mortlake Anglian & Alpha; Francesca Rawlins |
| Women 2- | Nottingham; Laura Wheeler & Lindsay Marshall | Thames; Sophie Theodorou & Barbara O'Brien | Strathclyde Park; Natalie Irvine & Gillian Connal |
| Women L2- | Mortlake Anglian & Alpha; Lorna Brown & Rebekah Edgar | Tethys; Cynthia Eccles & Maximiliane Quel | Marlow; Danielle Phillips & Tamsin Knill |
| Women 4+ | Upper Thames; Rachael O'Sullivan, Elise Cope, Rhona O'Leary, Nikki Brown, Diane Yarrow | Sport Imperial / Vesta; Christina Duffy, Mathilde Pauls, Amy Propsting, Kat Astley, Constance Pidoux | Strathclyde Park / Clydesdale / Edinburgh University; Ailie Ord, Gillian Connal, Hannah Stone, Ruth Dunn, Rhi Morgan |

== Under-23 ==
=== Medal summary ===
| Event | Gold | Silver | Bronze |
|---|---|---|---|
| Open 1x | Oxford Brookes University | Tideway Scullers School | Molesey |
| Women 1x | Clydesdale | Molesey | Tees |

== Junior ==
=== Medal summary ===
| Event | Gold | Silver | Bronze |
|---|---|---|---|
| Open J18 1x | Tideway Scullers School | Northwich | Trentham |
| Open J18 2- | Eton College | Clydesdale / King's College School | Reading |
| Open J18 2x | Trent | Ardingly | Star & Arrow |
| Open J18 4- | Calpe | Strathclyde Park / Loch Lomond | Lea |
| Open J18 4x | Marlow | Calpe | Evesham |
| Open J16 1x | Christchurch | Hinksey Sculling School | Reading |
| Open J16 2- | Aberdeen Schools | Pangbourne College | Henley |
| Open J16 2x | Nottingham | RGS High Wycombe | St Neots |
| Open J16 4- | Great Marlow School | Mediterranean | RGS Worcester |
| Open J16 4+ | Mediterranean | George Watson's College | Hinksey Sculling School |
| Open J16 4x | Marlow | Newark | Henley |
| Open J15 1x | Tideway Scullers School | St Paul's School | Star Club |
| Open J15 2x | Tideway Scullers School | Queens Park High School | York City |
| Open J15 4x+ | Trentham | Evesham | Grange School / Northwich |
| Open J14 1x | Tyne | Maidenhead | Reading |
| Open J14 2x | Nottingham | Trentham | Peterborough City |
| Open J14 4x+ | Henley | Claires Court | RGS High Wycombe |
| Women J18 1x | Lea | Tideway Scullers School | Kingsley School |
| Women J18 2- | Broxbourne / Castle Semple | King's Canterbury | Pangbourne College |
| Women J18 2x | Norwich | Henley | Gloucester Hartpury |
| Women J18 4- | Aberdeen Schools | Trentham | William Borlase |
| Women J18 4x | Runcorn / Warrington | Kingston Grammar School | Eton Excelsior / Marlow |
| Women J18 4+ | Aberdeen Schools | Eton Excelsior | William Borlase |
| Women J18 8+ | William Borlase | Trentham | Eton Excelsior / Marlow / Pangbourne College |
| Women J16 1x | Eton Excelsior B | Eton Excelsior A | Warrington |
| Women J16 2x | Henley | Tyne | Eton Excelsior |
| Women J16 4+ | William Borlase | Haberdasher's Monmouth Girls | Aberdeen Schools |
| Women J16 4x | Eton Excelsior / Marlow | Trent | Queen Elizabeth HS |
| Women J15 1x | Nottingham | Hollingworth Lake | Glasgow |
| Women J15 2x | Glasgow | Reading | Ross |
| Women J15 4x+ | Marlow | Maidenhead | Weybridge Ladies |
| Women J14 1x | Walton | Surbiton High School | Haberdasher's Monmouth Girls |
| Women J14 2x | George Watson's College | York City | Marlow |
| Women J14 4x+ | Walton | Henley | Queen Elizabeth HS |

Key
| Symbol | meaning |
|---|---|
| 1, 2, 4, 8 | crew size |
| + | coxed |
| - | coxless |
| x | sculls |
| 14 | Under-14 |
| 15 | Under-15 |
| 16 | Under-16 |
| J | Junior |
