= Mediterranean Rowing Club =

Rowing club in Gibraltar

- Location: 4 Europort Road, Gibraltar
- Coordinates: 36.1416°N 5.3586°W
- Founded: 1899
- Affiliations: British Rowing (boat code MDT)
- Website: mrc1899.com

Mediterranean Rowing Club is a rowing club near the Port of Gibraltar, based at 4 Europort Road, Gibraltar. The boathouse is next door to the Calpe Rowing Club.

== History ==
The club was founded in 1899. It is one of two clubs from Gibraltar that compete regularly at the British Rowing Championships, the other being the Calpe Rowing Club. Both clubs are also affiliated to the Gibraltar Amateur Rowing Association which in turn became affiliated to FISA in 1984. The club has produced multiple national British champions.

== Honours ==
=== British National Champions ===
Year	Winning crew/s
2010	Women J18 2-
2012	Open J16 4+
2013	Open J18 2-
2023	Open J16 2-
