= Calpe Rowing Club =

Rowing club in Gibraltar

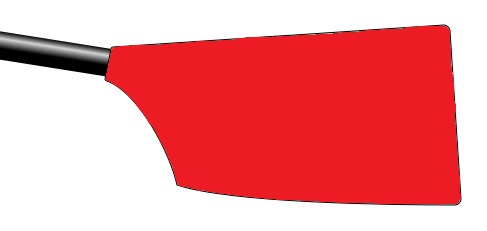
- Location: 6 Europort Road, Gibraltar
- Coordinates: 36.141460°N 5.358212°W
- Founded: 1876
- Affiliations: British Rowing (boat code CAL)
- Website: www.calperowingclub.com

Calpe Rowing Club is a rowing club near the Port of Gibraltar, based at 6 Europort Road, Gibraltar. The boathouse is next door to the Mediterranean Rowing Club.

== History ==
The club was founded in 1876 and was the first overseas club affiliated to the Amateur Rowing Association of Great Britain. It is one of two clubs from Gibraltar that compete regularly at the British Rowing Championships, the other being the Mediterranean Rowing Club. Both clubs are also affiliated to the Gibraltar Amateur Rowing Association which in turn became affiliated to FISA in 1984.

The club has produced multiple national British champions, particularly at junior level.

== Honours ==
=== British champions ===
Year	Winning crew/s
2004	Women J16 4x
2007	Open U23 2x
2009	Open J16 2x
2011	Women J18 2-
2012	Open J18 4-
2014	Open J14 4x+
2015	Open J15 2x
2018	Open J18 2x
2024	Women J16 2-
