= Walton Rowing Club =

Rowing club in Surrey, England

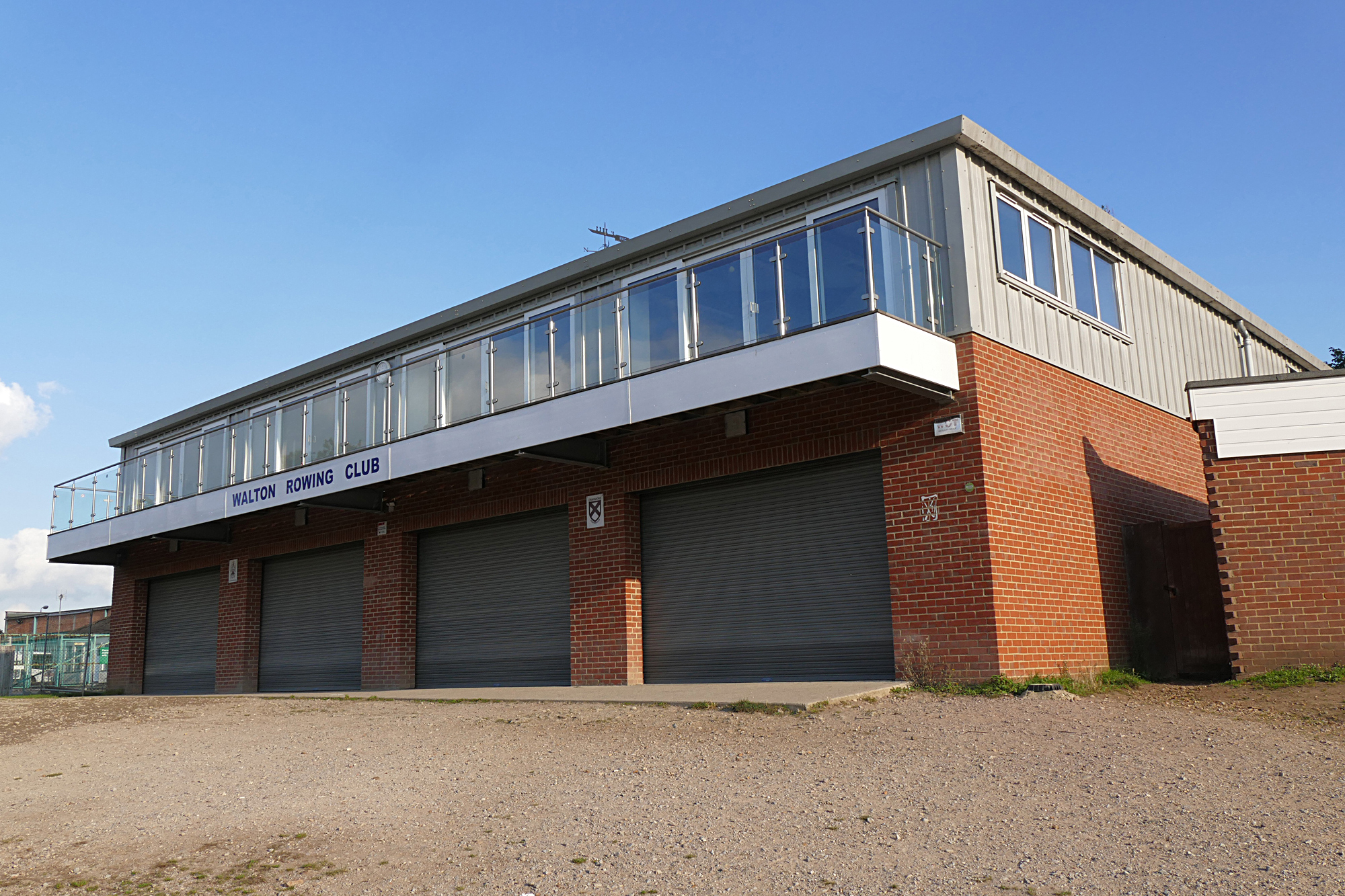

- Location: Walton on Thames, Surrey, England
- Coordinates: 51.3955°N 0.417°W
- Home water: Reach above Sunbury Lock, River Thames
- Founded: 1927
- Affiliations: British Rowing boat & composite crew code: WLT
- Website: www.waltonrowingclub.co.uk

Events
- Walton and Weybridge Regatta (May/June); Walton Small Boats Head (December)

Walton Rowing Club is an amateur rowing club, on the River Thames in England. Its large, modern, combined club and boat house is on the Surrey bank of the Thames, facing the Walton Mile straight, at Walton-on-Thames about 400 metres (1,300 ft) above Sunbury Lock cut. The club organises several rowing events, and members have competed at international level.

== History ==
The initial establishment of a club and affiliation to the Amateur Rowing Association took place in 1927 with the contribution of members of Thames Rowing Club and Kingston Rowing Club and including active members of Thames Valley Skiff Club and the now defunct Oatlands Rowing Club. The club's first President was Steve Fairbairn. Activities ceased during World War II and in the postwar period much effort was spent on establishing a clubhouse and boat house. This was the forerunner to the present building at the end of Sunbury Lane, 1953 to 2011.

The Club incepted Walton Amateur Regatta, and co-organises the Weybridge Regatta successor Walton and Weybridge Regatta. It organises in its own right, since 1978, the Walton Small Boats Head, a major December event in the club calendar.

The club was the first to have competed at National Schools Regatta as a non-school club – this was in 1976.

Nine men's juniors between 2007 and 2013 were selected for World Juniors, or World U23s.

The club won its 24th national title at the 2025 British Rowing Club Championships.

== Honours ==
=== British champions ===
Year	Winning crew/s
1976	Men 2-
1977	Men J16 2x
1992	Men J18 1x
1996	Men 4x, Men L4x
1997	Men L4x
2003	Men L1x, Men J14 1x
2004	Open J15 1x, Open J14 1x
2007	Women J15 4x+
2009	Open J16 4-
2010	Open J15 4x+, Open J14 2x
2011	Open J18 2x, Open J16 2x, Open J16 4-
2012	Women J14 1x, Women J14 4x+
2014	Women J16 2-
2015	Open J14 1x
2017	Open J16 2-
2018	Open J18 4-
2025	Open J18 2-

=== Henley Royal Regatta ===
Year	Races won	Notes
1971	Double Sculls Challenge Cup	M 2x, MA & CA Brigden
1993	Fawley Challenge Cup	MJ 4x with Trent Rowing Club^{1}

== Notable members ==
The most successful Senior international rower who trained almost contemporaneously at the club was Steve Trapmore, who stroked the winning Great Britain men's eight at the Sydney 2000 Summer Olympics and won a World Championship title two years later in a GB four. He went on to retire with a back injury in 2003 and become a longstanding Olympic Rowing Programme and head Cambridge University coach.

- Steve Fairbairn
- Claude Goldie
- Angus Groom
- Matthew Tarrant
- Steve Trapmore

== See also ==
- Rowing on the River Thames
