= Trentham Boat Club =

British rowing club

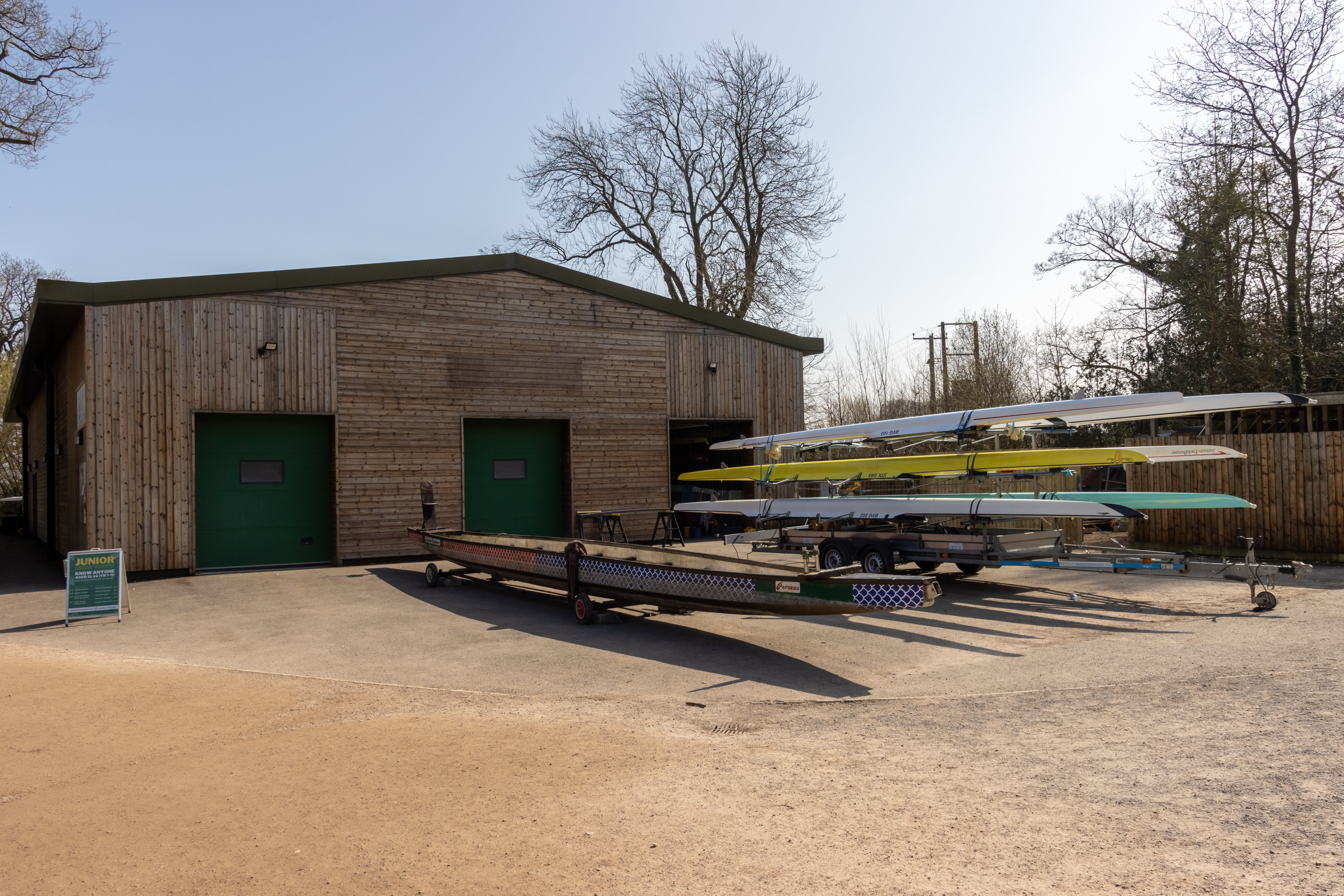

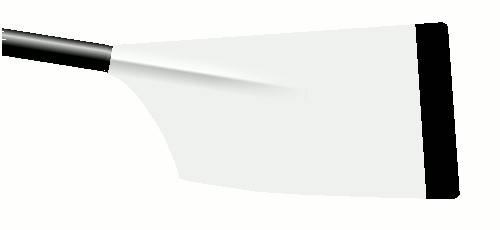
- Location: Trentham Gardens Estate, Stone Road, Trentham, Stoke-on-Trent, Staffordshire, England
- Coordinates: 52.950670°N 2.194622°W
- Founded: 2004
- Affiliations: British Rowing boat code - STK
- Website: www.trenthamboatclub.co.uk

Trentham Boat Club is a rowing club based on Trentham Lake next to the River Trent, at Trentham Gardens Estate, Stone Road, Trentham, Stoke-on-Trent, Staffordshire, England.

== History ==
An original Trentham Rowing Club existed and it organised the Trentham Rowing Club Regatta in 1988.

The current club is relatively new, being founded in 2004 but has produced ten national champions since 2009, the same year that they built their new boathouse.

== Honours ==
=== National champions ===
Year	Winning crew
2009	Women J14 4x+
2010	Women J18 8+, Women J16 4+
2012	Open J15 4x+
2013	Open J14 4x+
2017	Open J14 4x+
2018	Open J15 1x, Open J14 4x+
2019	Open J14 4x+, Women J15 4x+

Key

- J junior
- 2, 4, 8 crew size
- 18, 16, 15, 14 age group
- x sculls
- - coxless
- + coxed
