= Inverness Rowing Club =

Scottish rowing club

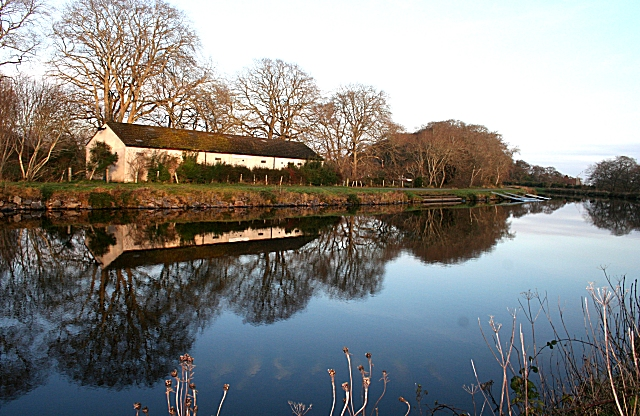

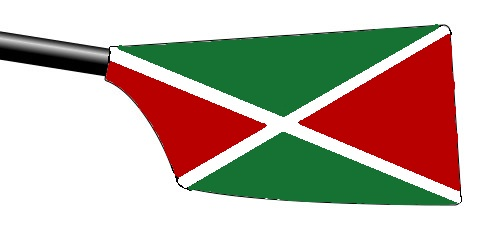
- Location: Torvean, Inverness, Scottish Highlands
- Coordinates: 57.461869°N 4.245081°W
- Founded: 1987
- Affiliations: Scottish Rowing
- Website: invernessrowingclub.org.uk

Inverness Rowing Club is a rowing club on the Caledonian Canal next to the River Ness based at Torvean, Inverness, Scottish Highlands. The club is affiliated to Scottish Rowing.

== History ==
The original club was founded in 1883 and rowed on the local canal and associated waters. A boathouse was built in 1885 bt the Tomnahurich Bridge on the Caledonian Canal and two boats were bought. It is not known when the club disbanded.

The current club came to existence in 1987, changing its name from Rogie Falls Boat Club.

The club is due to undergo significant development over the next five years which includes a new boathouse.

The club has produced several national champions.

== Honours ==
=== National champions ===
Year	Winning crew/s
2010	Open 2x
2019	Women J18 4-

== Notable members ==
- Alan Sinclair
