= Molesey Boat Club =

British rowing club

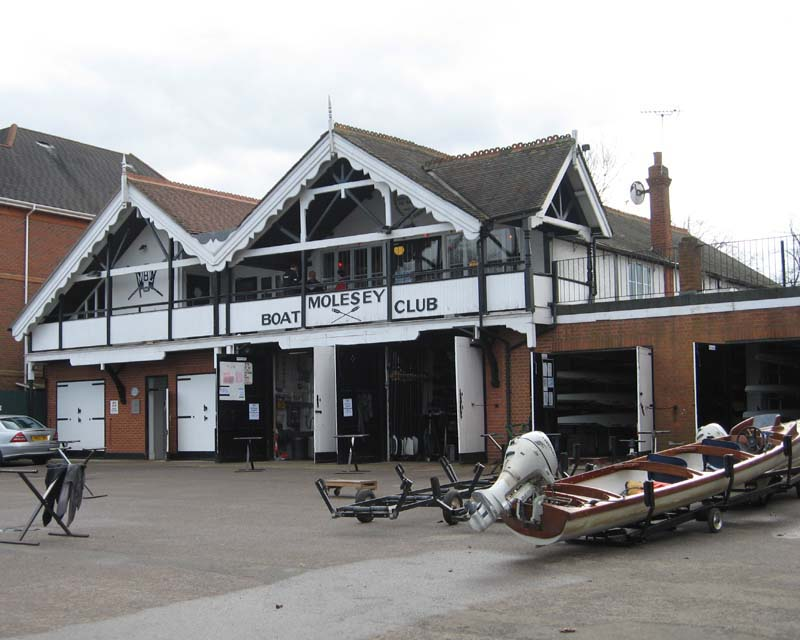

- Location: Graburn Way (informally on Barge Walk), East Molesey, Surrey England
- Coordinates: 51°24′26″N 0°21′4.5″W
- Home water: River Thames
- Founded: 1866
- Membership: 700
- Affiliations: British Rowing boat code - MBC
- Website: www.moleseyboatclub.org

Events
- Molesey Regatta, Molesey Junior Regatta, Molesey Veterans Head

Distinctions
- Head of the River Race (1st 2010), Henley Royal Regatta (numerous wins)

Notable members
- Martin Cross, Chris Martin, Ian McNuff, Greg Searle, Jonny Searle, Phil Simmons, Andrew Triggs Hodge

Molesey Boat Club is a rowing club between Molesey Lock and Sunbury Lock on the River Thames in England. The club was founded in 1866 where its boathouse stands with hardstanding next to the Thames Path.

Molesey has been the organising or support club for Molesey Regatta since its inception in 1867.

== Results ==
=== Head of the River Race ===
2015: 2nd
2014: 1st (of 70. Unofficial as race was abandoned as wind increased.)
2013: Race Cancelled
2012: 2nd (Note: of 404 eights to finish.)
2011: 2nd (Note: of 393 eights to finish.)
2010: 1st (Note: of 388 eights to finish.)
2009: 4th (Note: of 409 eights to finish.)
2008: 8th (Note: No Molesey international members present)
2007: 3rd (of unknown number. Unofficial as race was abandoned after several crews sank.)
2006: 3rd
2005: 4th
2004: Race Cancelled
2003: 2nd
2002: 4th
2001: 4th
2000: 5th

=== Henley Royal Regatta ===
- Grand Challenge Cup: 1960, 2009†, 2013† 2015†
- Thames Challenge Cup: 1999, 2000, 2009, 2012, 2016, 2022
- Stewards' Challenge Cup: 1963, 1991†, 2007†, 2011†, 2014† 2017†
- Wyfold Challenge Cup: 1892, 1893, 1959, 1978, 1985, 1997, 2015, 2018
- Visitors' Challenge Cup: 2012†
- Ladies' Challenge Plate: 1991†, 2013†
- Prince of Wales Challenge Cup: 2004
- Prince Philip Challenge Cup: 1964, 1993†, 2002 (Note: Elite international men's coxed fours. Replaced in 2004 to narrow the Britannia Challenge Cup to clubs and so to create the Prince Albert Challenge Cup for students)
- Britannia Challenge Cup: 1999, 2004, 2008, 2019
- Silver Goblets & Nickalls Challenge Cup: 1984†, 1985†, 2000, 2011†, 2015†
- Diamond Challenge Sculls: 1997

Women's events, most not integrated into main regatta - expanded to three in total in 2014

- Wargrave Challenge Cup: 2025

Henley Women's Regatta wins since 1991. † = composite (with other club)

- Ron Needs Challenge Cup: (Note: Championship (heavyweight) eights.) 2018†
- The GP Jeffries Cup: (Note: Senior coxed (heavyweight) eights.) 2017
- Avril Vellacott Cup: (Note: Elite coxless (heavyweight) fours.) 2011†, 2009†, 2018, 2025
- Vesta Cup: (Note: Elite coxless lightweight fours) 2011
- Sports Council Cup: (Note: Elite eights) 2008†, 1999†
- Frank Harry Cup: (Note: Senior coxed fours) 2007
- FISA Senior B Category 1x: 2005
- Chairman's Trophy: (Note: Aspirational 4x) 2018
- Bea Langridge Trophy: (Note: Junior 4x) 2003†
- Rayner Cup: (Note: Junior 2x) 2018

=== Recent British Championships ===
- 2009 Women L4-
- 2011 Open 2x, Open 4+, Women L1x
- 2014 Open 4-

National Schools' Regatta

- 2023 GOLD: Championship Boys 4-, Championship Girls 2x, SILVER: J16 Boys 4x, J15 Boys 4x+, BRONZE: J16 Girls 4x
- 2022 GOLD: J16 Girls 2x SILVER: J14 Boys 4x+
- 2018 GOLD: Championship Girls 1x, SILVER: Championship Boys 4-, Championship Girls 2-
- 2017 GOLD: Boys 1st Eights, BRONZE: Championship Girls 2x

== Squads and management ==
The club consists of approximately 700 members, consisting of juniors, novices, seniors, veterans and Great Britain internationals of both genders.

- Senior squad. Approximately 140 members. Molesey has been identified as and designated a "High Performance Club" for senior heavyweight men by British Rowing due to the breadth and extent of high standards among this group and professional coaching being available. With women and lightweight categories for both sexes, this is the club's largest active rowing group.
- Junior squad. Approximately 70-80 athletes. Closely linked to a number of local schools. The junior system offers rowing from the age of 13. The Junior programme's objective is to build towards success at J18 level domestically and internationally.
- Adult development or 'Explore Recreational Rowing'. Approximately 60 members, offers rowing and sculling for people who want to take up the sport later in life with transition to the senior or masters categories possible.
- Masters (formerly this category was known in rowing as Veterans) is the largest group in numbers whether or not including the club's discounted-fees Social Members. Masters categories A to H, men's and women's have representatives in most years at local, national and/or international events.

The club is run by a committee of 16 elected members, including the five officers of the club, Captain, Deputy Captain, Vice Captain, Secretary and Treasurer.

== Notable members (past & present) ==
- Martin Cross: Olympic bronze and gold: 4- 1980, 4+ 1984
- Rowley Douglas: Monkton Combe 2nd 8+, Olympic gold medallist: 8+ 2000
- Simon Fieldhouse: World Championships GBR 4+ 2006, 4x 2007
- James Foad: World Championships GBR 8+ 2010, 2011
- Fred Gill: Cambridge University Blue 2010
- Andrew Holmes: Junior World Champion GBR 4- 2009
- Tom James: Olympic gold medallist: 4- 2008, 4- 2012
- Peter Marsland: Cambridge University Blue 2008, 2009
- Ian McNuff: Olympic bronze: 4- 1980
- Rebecca Muzerie: 2020 Olympian
- George Nash: Olympic bronze: 2- 2012, World Championships gold 8+ 2013, Cambridge Blue 2010, 2011, 2013.
- Cameron Nichol: World Championships GBR 8+ 2010, 2011
- Dan Ouseley: Olympian 8+ 2004
- Tom Ransley: World Championships GBR 8+ 2009–2011; Cambridge University Blue 2008, 2009
- Moe Sbihi: World Championships GBR 8+ 2010, 2011, Olympic bronze medallist: 8+ 2012, Olympic gold medallist: 4- 2016, Olympic bronze medallist: 8+ 2020
- Greg Searle: Olympic gold and bronze: 2+ 1992, 4- 1996
- Jonny Searle: Olympic gold and bronze: 2+ 1992, 4- 1996
- Phil Simmons: Olympian GBR 8+ 2004
- Ben Smith: Oxford University Blue 2008
- Tom Solesbury: World Championships GBR 8+ 2006, 2007, Olympian 2- 2008
- Richard Stanhope: Olympic silver: 8+ 1980
- Andrew Triggs Hodge: Olympic gold medallist: 4- 2008, 4- 2012
- Jim Walker: Olympic Games GBR 8+ 1992, 8+ 1996; World Championships GBR 8+ 1989 (Bronze); Junior World Championships GBR 4- 1986 (Silver)
- Holly Dunford: Olympic bronze medalist GBR 8+ 2024, World Championships GBR 8+ (Silver), 4+ (Silver)
- Megan Slabbert: European GBR 8+ (gold) and 2- (Bronze)
- Jonna De Vries: European NED Mens 8+ (Silver) (Cox)
- Oliver Stanhope: Paralympic PR3 mixed coxed four 2021 (gold); World Championships PR3 mixed coxed four 2017, 2018, 2019, 2022 (gold)

== Attractions ==
The Molesey stretch allows a 4.5 km navigation from main weir to main weir and is shared with the Millennium Boat House of Hampton and Lady Eleanor Holles Schools. The second non-tidal reach above Teddington Lock, banks lack the funnelling walls at many points along the widening reach below, factors which lead to fewer waves on windy days. The club has organised or been the main supporting club for the organising of Molesey Regatta since it was founded, a year after the club.

The club was the first place that Queen guitarist Brian May used his Red Special guitar live on stage with his group 1984.

== Sponsors ==
The club does not currently have any sponsors. Previously it has been sponsored by a Building Society and the International Sports Promotion Society. The club has also received sponsorship from Sport England and Elmbridge Borough Council and other organisations and public bodies in the past.

== See also ==
- Rowing on the River Thames

== Notes and references ==
Notes
