= Dan Ouseley =

British rower (born 1979)

Medal record

Men's rowing

Representing Great Britain

World Rowing Championships
| Bronze medal – third place | 2001 Lucerne | M4+ |
| Bronze medal – third place | 2003 Milan | M8+ |

Dan Ouseley (born 18 January 1979 in Paddington) is a British rower.
