= Nottingham Rowing Club =

British rowing club

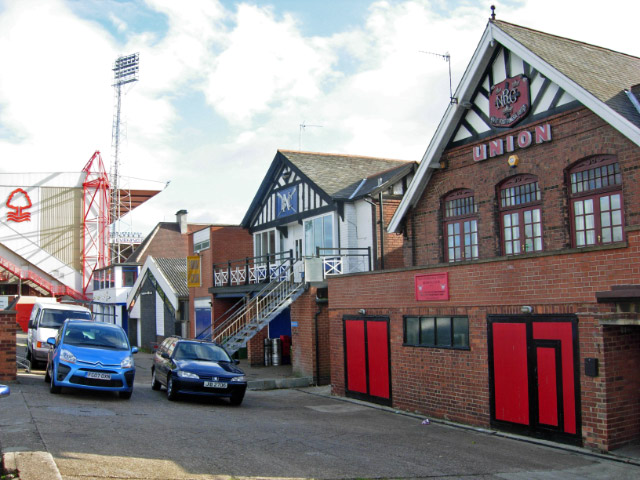

- Location: West Bridgford, Nottingham, England
- Home water: River Trent, Holme Pierrepont National Watersports Centre
- Founded: 2006
- Affiliations: British Rowing boat code - NRC
- Website: nottingham-rowing-club.co.uk

Events
- Nottingham Autumn Head; Nottingham Head of the Trent; Nottingham Regatta (with Nottingham & Union RC)

Nottingham Rowing Club is a rowing club in West Bridgford, Nottingham, England.

== History ==
The club was formed in 2006 as a merger of the Nottingham Boat Club and the Nottingham Britannia Rowing Club, two historic rowing clubs that were established in 1892 and 1869 respectively. Since the merger of the two clubs, the NRC has incorporated the former Nottingham Schools Rowing Association and the Nottinghamshire County Rowing Association. Members from the two founder clubs have had success in national and international regattas, and represented the Great Britain team at World Championship and Olympic level. The Britannia Challenge Cup at Henley Royal Regatta is named after Nottingham Britannia Rowing Club, who donated the cup in 1969 to mark their centenary.

Successes by the club since its foundation include winning the Club Pennant at the 2008 Women's Eights Head of the River Race, while members of the new club have represented Great Britain at World Cup events and won elite finals at Women's Henley.

The club won two national titles at the 2024 British Rowing Championships and the 2025 British Rowing Club Championships.

== Boathouses ==
The current club has three boathouses situated on the River Trent in West Bridgford, as well as a presence at Holme Pierrepont. The Boat Club boathouse is also locally well known as a music venue.

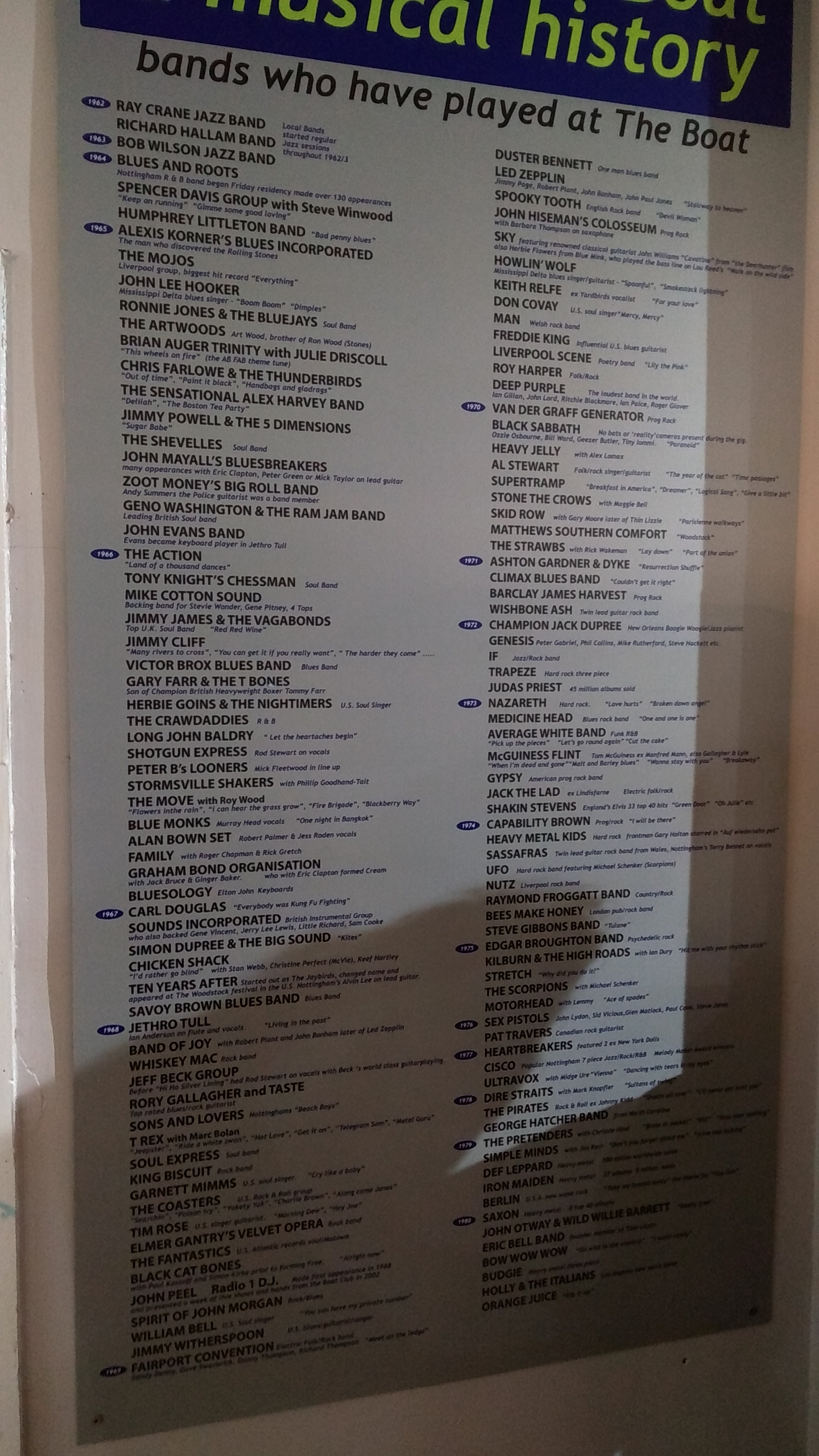
Sign displayed at the Boat Club listing famous bands who have played there.

Elton John, Rod Stewart, the Sex Pistols, Led Zeppelin and Black Sabbath all played at the venue, and Radio 1's John Peel broadcast from the club in 2002.

== Honours ==
=== British champions ===
Year	Winning crew/s
2003	Women L2-
2007	Women 2-, Open L4-
2008	Women U23 1x
2009	Open 2x, Women 1x, Open J14 1x, Open J14 4x+, Women J17 1x, Women J15 1x, Women J15 2x
2010	Women 4x
2011	Open 4-, Women 2x, Women 4x
2012	Women 1x, Women 2-
2013	Open J18 2x, Open J15 1x
2013	Open J18 1x
2018	Open 2x
2024	W club 4x-, W club 4-
2025	Open club 2-, Open club 4x-

Key

- W (women), J (junior), 2, 4, 8 (crew size), 18, 16, 15, 14 (age group), x (sculls), - (coxless), + (coxed)

=== Henley Royal Regatta ===
Year	Races won
1979	Diamond Challenge Sculls
1980	Wyfold Challenge Cup
1982	Wyfold Challenge Cup
1997	Thames Challenge Cup
2008	Fawley Challenge Cup
2012	Wyfold Challenge Cup
2018	Stonor Challenge Trophy
2019	Prince of Wales Challenge Cup
