= Ross Rowing Club =

British rowing club

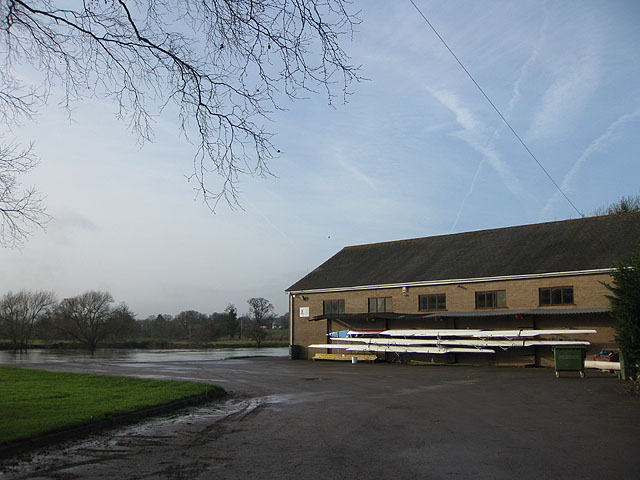

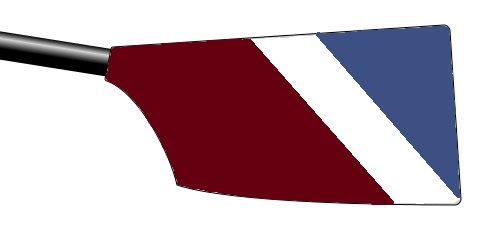
- Location: The Ropewalk, Ross-on-Wye, Herefordshire, England
- Coordinates: 51.917441°N 2.589221°W
- Founded: 1870
- Affiliations: British Rowing (boat code ROS)
- Website: www.rossrowingclub.co.uk

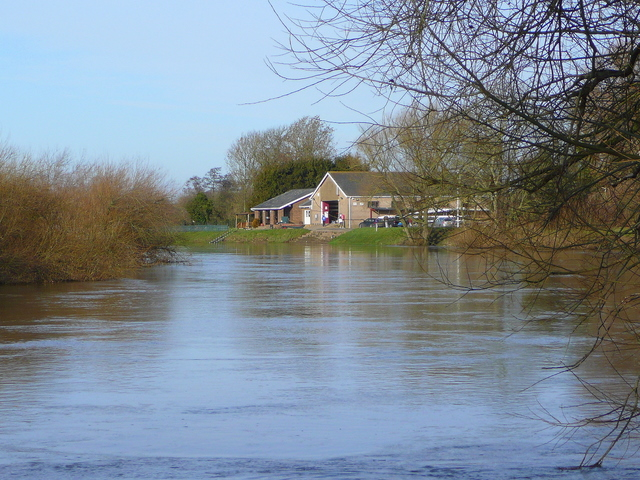
Ross Rowing Club clubhouse and boathouse

Ross Rowing Club is a rowing club on the River Wye, based at The Ropewalk, Ross-on-Wye, Herefordshire, England. The Ross Regatta is held over the August Bank Holiday weekend.

== History ==
The club was founded in 1870 with the club's first headquarters being at the Hope Public House. The first boathouse was built in 1908 costing £400 and by 1909 the club had grown to 120 members and had plans for tennis courts and a bowling green.

In 1947 and 2009 respectively, the club won the West of England Challenge Vase. A new clubhouse was built in the late 1970s and a new boat store was built in 1985.

The club has produced national champions in 2013 and 2018.

The clubhouse was damaged and closed following consecutive floods in 2019, 2020 and 2021 and cost the club significant funds to repair the damages. The clubhouse re-opened on 4 June 2022 and subsequently Ross RC received a Sport England grant of £75,000.

== Honours ==
=== National champions ===
Year	Winning crew/s
2013	Women J14 4x+
2018	Women J14 4x
