= Dart Totnes Amateur Rowing Club =

British rowing club

- Location: Steamer Quay Road, Totnes, Devon
- Coordinates: 50.425202°N 3.678424°W
- Affiliations: British Rowing (boat code DAT)
- Website: darttotnes.co.uk

Dart Totnes Amateur Rowing Club is a rowing club on the River Dart, based at Steamer Quay Road, Totnes, Devon.

== History ==
The club has a fleet of 35 boats and a boathouse on the River Dart that was built in 1985 which contains an ergo room was founded in 2008 and is affiliated to British Rowing.

The club competes in the British Rowing Championships and won the men's lightweight double sculls at the 1981 British Rowing Championships.

== Honours ==
=== British champions ===
Year	Winning crew/s
1981	Men's lightweight 2x
