= Avon County Rowing Club =

English rowing club

- Location: Saltford Rowing Centre, Bath Road, Saltford, Bristol, England
- Coordinates: 51.398521°N 2.447412°W
- Affiliations: British Rowing (boat code AVN)
- Website: avoncountyrowingclub.org.uk

Avon County Rowing Club is a rowing club on the River Avon based at the Saltford Rowing Centre, Bath Road, Saltford, Bristol, England.

== History ==
The club was founded in 1973 as a result of a merger between two clubs called the Avon Rowing Club and Bristol Rowing Club. The first honours were won at the Llandaff Regatta the same season.

The boathouse is shared between the University of Bristol Boat Club, Monkton Combe School Boat Club, Canoe Avon and the Bristol Empire Dragon Boat club.

The club has produced multiple British champions.

== Honours ==
=== British champions ===
Year	Winning crew/s
1999	Women lightweight 4-
2000	Women lightweight 4-
2001	Women J15 2x
2003	Women J18 2x
2004	Women J18 2x, Women J18 4x
2009	Women J18 8+
2014	Women J14 2x
2015	Women J15 2x
