= British Rowing Championships =

Rowing event

British National Rowing Championships
- Status: Senior (active); Junior (active)
- Genre: rowing
- Frequency: annually
- Previous event: 2024
- Next event: 2025
- Organiser: British Rowing

The British Rowing Championships usually take place every year and are normally held at the National Water Sports Centre, Holme Pierrepont (Nottingham), with occasional championships held at the Strathclyde Country Park. The championships originally incorporated Senior and Junior crews but in 2013 they were held separately for the first time. The Junior events ran without issues, but from 2019 to 2023 the senior championships did not run due to lack of entries. In 2024, the championships recombined. It is a major event for club rowers and schools and events are held for open, women, open junior, women's junior, under 23, lightweight, adaptive and coastal boats.

Each crew member of the first, second and third placed crews in each event receive gold, silver and bronze medals respectively. The club champion in each event (i.e. the highest placed non-composite crew) also receives a wooden club champions plaque to display in their clubhouse.

== History ==
The Championships were inaugurated in 1972 and held at the National Watersports Centre in Nottingham, which had only been built the previous year.

In 2010, the Regatta adopted the title British Rowing Championships to reflect the change in name of the Amateur Rowing Association to British Rowing. The logo and branding now reflects that of British Rowing. The 40th anniversary of the Championships was celebrated in 2012. Although it has been the practice for the Championships to be held in Scotland at the Strathclyde Country Park every fourth year, the 2014 Championships was held in Nottingham. This was because Scotland hosted the 2014 Commonwealth Rowing Championships at Strathclyde Country Park. Since 2016, the Championships have only been held in Nottingham.

A decision was taken in 2012 that in order to raise the standard of senior competition, the senior events from the Championships would be moved to autumn from 2013. This resulted in the Championships splitting into the senior championships and junior championships, with the latter continuing to be held during July.

In 2019, the Senior Championships were cancelled due to insufficient entries and the 2020 edition was not scheduled, with British Rowing stating it was reviewing the dates and format following the lack of entries for the 2019 Championships. The event did not get scheduled again until 2024, when the decision was made to combine both the senior and junior championships once again.

== Dates and locations of Championships ==
=== Senior and Junior combined ===
Year	Number	Dates	Location	Notes
1972	1	22–23 July 1972	Nottingham	Inaugural Championships
1973	2	21–22 July 1973	Nottingham	
1974	3	20–21 July 1974	Nottingham	Record entry of 330 crews.
1975	4	19–20 July 1975	Nottingham	
1976	5	16–18 July 1976	Nottingham	Entry affected by Olympic year.
1977	6	15–17 July 1977	Nottingham	
1978	7	14–16 July 1978	Nottingham	Record entry of 428 crews.
1979	8	20–21 July 1979	Nottingham	
1980	9	18–20 July 1980	Nottingham	Entry affected by Olympic year.
1981	10	17–19 July 1981	Nottingham	
1982	11	17–18 July 1982	Nottingham	
1983	12	16–17 July 1983	Nottingham	
1984	13	14–15 July 1984	Nottingham	Entry affected by Olympic year.
1985	14	20–21 July 1985	Nottingham	Record entry of 517 crews.
1986	15	18–20 July 1986	Nottingham	Entry affected by Commonwealth Games year.
1987	16	17–19 July 1987	Nottingham	
1988	17	15–17 July 1988	Nottingham	Record entry of 561 crews.
1989	18	14–16 July 1989	Strathclyde	First Championships away from Nottingham.
1990	19	20–22 July 1990	Nottingham	Record entry of 653 crews.
1991	20	19–21 July 1991	Nottingham	
1992	21	17–19 July 1992	Nottingham	
1993	22	16–18 July 1993	Strathclyde	
1994	23	15–17 July 1994	Nottingham	
1995	24	14–16 July 1995	Nottingham	Record entry of 741 crews.
1996	25	19–21 July 1996	Nottingham	
1997	26	18–20 July 1997	Nottingham	
1998	27	17–19 July 1998	Strathclyde	
1999	28	16–18 July 1999	Nottingham	
2000	29	14–16 July 2000	Nottingham	
2001	30	20–22 July 2001	Nottingham	
2002	31	19–21 July 2002	Nottingham	
2003	32	18–20 July 2003	Strathclyde	
2004	33	16–18 July 2004	Nottingham	
2005	34	15–17 July 2005	Nottingham	
2006	35	14–16 July 2006	Strathclyde	
2007	36	20–22 July 2007	Nottingham	
2008	37	18–20 July 2008	Nottingham	
2009	38	17–19 July 2009	Nottingham	
2010	39	16–18 July 2010	Strathclyde	
2011	40	15–17 July 2011	Nottingham	
2012	41	13–15 July 2012	Nottingham	

=== Senior Championships ===
Year	Number	Dates	Location	Notes
2013	42	19–20 October 2013	Nottingham	
2014	43	18–19 October 2014	Nottingham	
2015	44	17–18 October 2015	Nottingham	
2016	45	22–23 October 2016	Nottingham	
2017	46	21–22 October 2017	Nottingham	cancelled; weather
2018	47	20–21 October 2018	Nottingham	
2019	48	15–16 June 2019	Nottingham	cancelled; insufficient entries
2020	-	Not held	n/a	in order to give more time to review future dates and format.
2021-23	-	Not held	n/a	no official statement
2024	49	19–22 July 2024	Nottingham	Combined with junior championships
2025	50	18–21 July 2025	Nottingham	Combined with junior championships

=== Junior Championships ===
Year	Number	Dates	Location	Notes
2013	42	20–21 July 2013	Nottingham	
2014	43	19–20 July 2014	Nottingham	
2015	44	18–19 July 2015	Strathclyde	
2016	45	15–17 July 2016	Nottingham	
2017	46	14–16 July 2017	Nottingham	
2018	47	19–21 July 2018	Nottingham	
2019	48	19–21 July 2019	Nottingham	
2020	49	17–19 July 2020	Nottingham	Cancelled due to COVID-19 pandemic
2021	49	16-18 July 2021	Nottingham	
2022	50	15-17 July 2022	Nottingham	
2023	51	14-16 July 2023	Strathclyde	
2024	52	19–22 July 2024	Nottingham	Combined with senior championships
2025	53	18–21 July 2025	Nottingham	Combined with senior championships
