= Eton Excelsior Rowing Club =

British rowing club

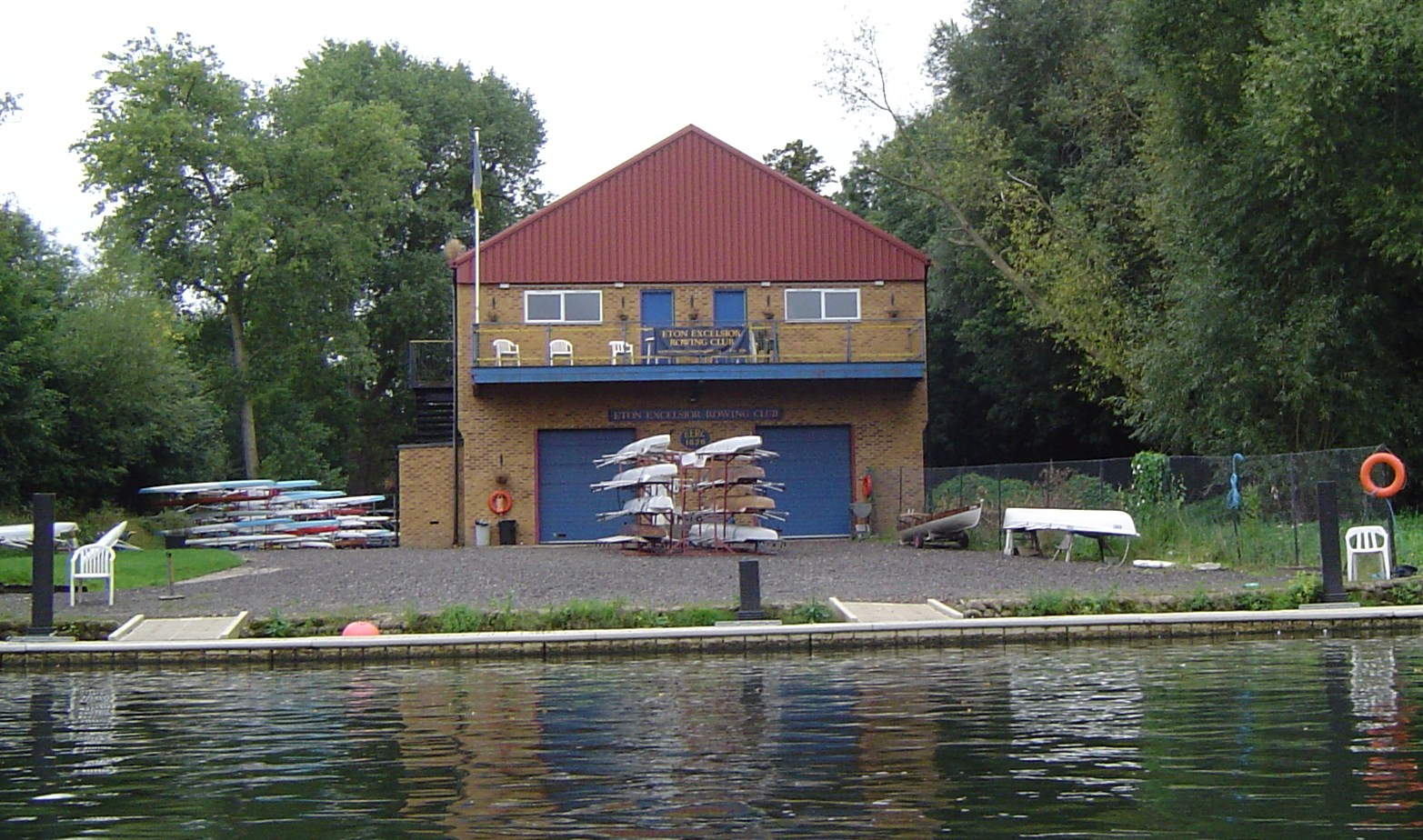

- Location: Bray, Berkshire
- Coordinates: 51°29′14″N 0°39′43.7″W
- Home water: Boveney Lock, River Thames
- Founded: 1821
- Affiliations: British Rowing boat code - ETX
- Website: www.etonexcelsiorrowingclub.org

Eton Excelsior Rowing Club is an open rowing club, affiliated with British Rowing. It is located on the Southern bank of the River Thames, west of the town of Windsor in England (///fades.scars.c). It is located on an approximately 5 km reach of river between Bray Lock (upstream) and Boveney Lock (downstream).

The club is closest to Windsor, Slough and Eton and is open to men, women, adults, juniors and veterans. The club's colours are navy and amber.

The club's origin can be traced to 2 January 1826 when ten men signed-up as the first members, agreeing to abide by the club's articles.

The club was founded as an intermittent club in 1821 and formally established in 1851.

== Boathouse ==
The club's original boat house was in King Stable Street in Eton, Berkshire, close to Windsor Bridge, on the north bank of the Thames; the reach between Boveney Lock (upstream) and Romney Lock (downstream). The site was leased from Eton College until the mid-1990s when the college decided to develop much of the Eton riverside and the club had to find a new home. For five years the club rented rack space from Eton College at Andrew's Boat House (also used by the Army Rowing Clubs Association) just upstream from Boveney Lock. The club eventually found the present site which was split with Wraysbury Skiff and Punting Club who were also looking for a new site at the time. Wraysbury were able to stay at their existing site near Staines-upon-Thames and withdrew. Construction was completed in 2001 and Eton Excelsior moved in during September of that year.

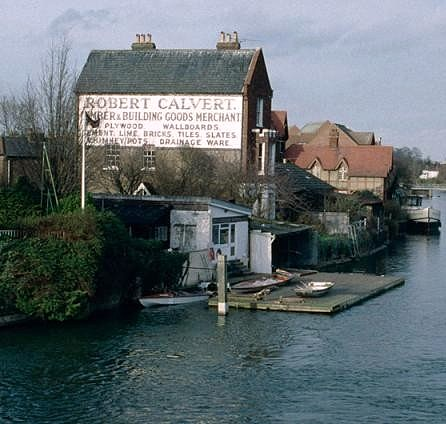
Original EERC Club HOuse in Eton

== History ==
The club lost nine of its members during the First World War;

- Private Stanley William Joseph Bennett (died 31 August 1917)
- Trooper Alfred Blane (died of wounds 24 September 1915)
- Private Christian Harnack (killed 30 August 1918)
- Trooper Herbert Henry Hiley (killed 21 August 1915)
- Gunner Cyril Jackson (killed 28 June 1917)
- 2nd Lieutenant Walter Le Grove (killed 25 April 1918)
- 2nd Lieutenant Walter Scott Mertz (died 28 July 1916)
- Private Leslie Baynes Starling (killed 29 August 1918)
- Lance Corporal Robert Edward White (killed 22 August 1917)

The club lost eight of its members during the Second World War;

- Sub-Lieutenant Arthur Giles Blake (killed 29 October 1940)
- Sergeant Eric Albert Blore (killed 19 August 1942)
- Lieutenant Ralph Rivers-Bodilly (killed 29 December 1943)
- Lieutenant Richard John "Dickie" Cork DSO DSC (killed 14 April 1944)
- Sergeant Ronald Giles (killed 20 February 1944)
- Pilot Officer David Stewart Harrison (killed 28 September 1940)
- Major Peter Augustus Edward Watson (killed 27 February 1945)
- Flight-Lieutenant Michael Myers Wayman DFC (killed 20 March 1943)

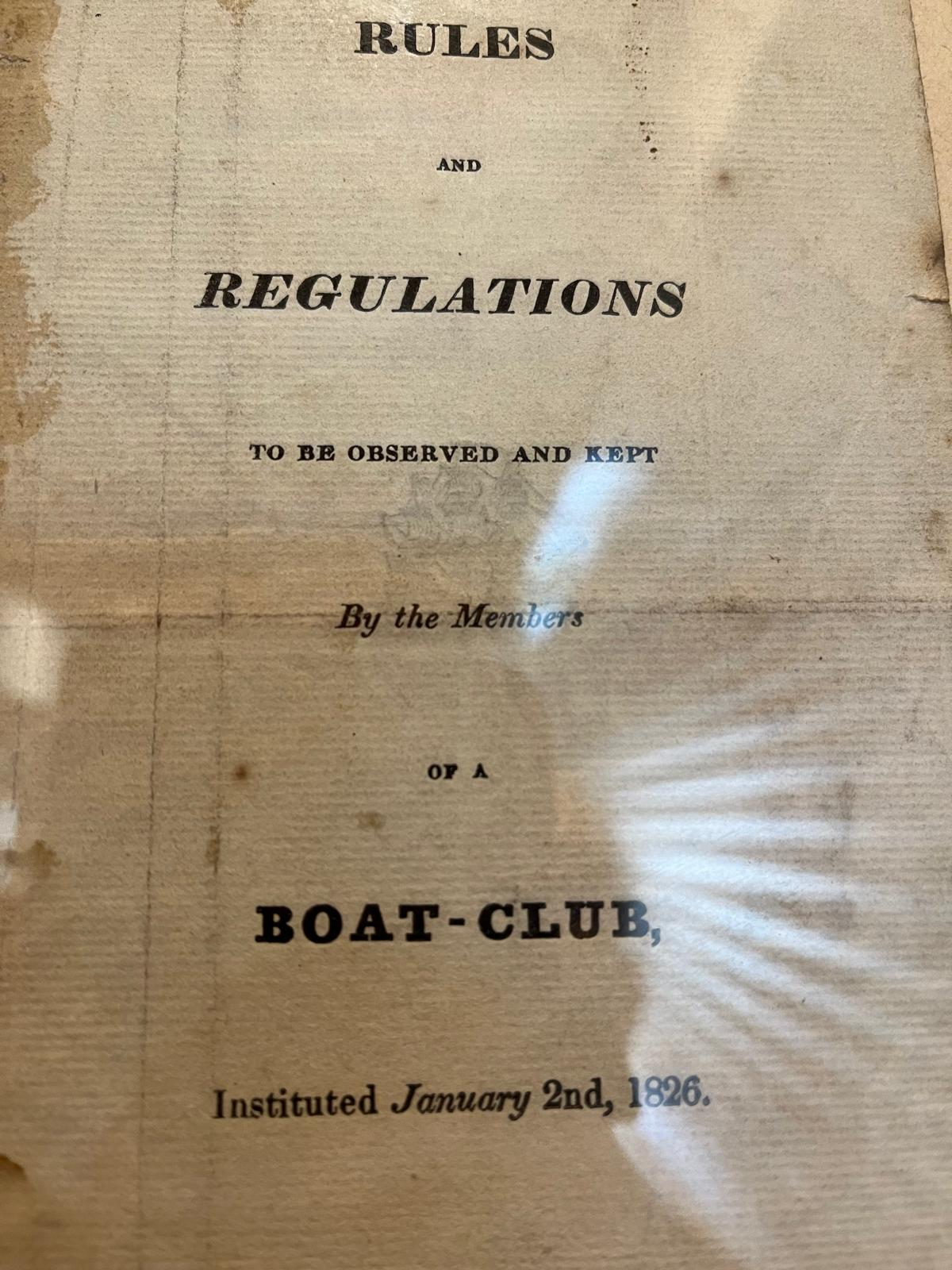
EERC Rules & Regulations 1826

In 1940, members of the club were responsible for forming the Windsor Boys' School Boat Club when, at a Committee meeting on 2 April 1940, it decided to start coaching boys from the Windsor County Boys' School when Excelsior's rowing assets were unused by its members during World War II.

== Honours ==
=== Henley Royal Regatta ===
Year	Races won
1866	Town Challenge Cup
1867	Town Challenge Cup
1869	Town Challenge Cup
1870	Town Challenge Cup

=== British champions ===
Year	Winning crew/s
1993	Women J18 2x
2010	Women J14 2x
2011	Women J16 1x, Women J15 4x+
2012	Women J16 1x, Women J16 4x

== See also ==
- Rowing on the River Thames
