= George Watson's College Rowing Club =

British rowing club

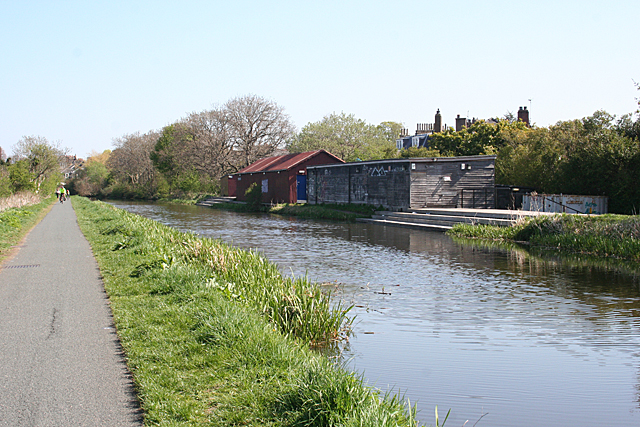

- George Watson's boathouse is the flat roof building in the foreground.
- Location: Edinburgh, Scotland
- Home water: Union Canal, Edinburgh
- Founded: 1958
- Key people: Adam Johnston (Acting Head Coach); Caroline McPherson (Assistant Head); Nigel Muir (Coach)
- Colours: Maroon, White, Navy
- Affiliations: Scottish Rowing; British Rowing

George Watson's College Boat Club (GWCBC), formerly known as George Watson's College Rowing Club, is the official rowing club of George Watson's College, located in Edinburgh, Scotland.

GWCBC is affiliated with Scottish Rowing and has produced multiple British champions.

== History ==
The club has been competing at the British Rowing Championships since its inception in 1972 and has won multiple titles with the most recent being at the 2025 British Rowing Club Championships.

== Honours ==
=== British champions ===
Year	Winning crew/s
1972	Women J18 4+
1989	Women J16 4+, Women J16 8+
1990	Women J18 4+, Women J18 8+, Women J16 8+
1991	Women J18 4+, Women J18 8+
1993	Men J16 2-, Women J16 8+, Women J15 1x, Women J14 4x
1994	Women J18 2-, Women J16 8+
1996	Women J15 2x
1997	Women J18 2x, Women J18 8+, Women J16 2x
1998	Women J16 1x
1999	Women J18 2x
2001	Men L4x
2002	Men J16 2x
2003	Men U23 1x, Men J18 1x
2006	Women J18 2x
2007	Open J15 2x
2008	Open J16 2, Open J16 2x
2012	Women J14 2x
2023	Open J18 2-
2024	Open J14 2x, Open J14 1x
2025	Open J16 4x-
2026	Women’s J16 1x, Women’s J18 4x (GHS composite) -

== Notable alumni ==
- Callum McBrierty graduated from the club in 2010 after coming 2nd in the u19 world rowing championship men's four. McBrierty went on to win gold in the coxed pair in the 2016 world rowing championships.
- Harry Leask Started his rowing at George Watson’s College before representing Scotland and Great Britain; made his Olympic debut in Tokyo 2020 winning silver in the men's quadruple sculls and finished fourth in the Men’s Single Sculls at the 2018 World Championships.

== Head coaches ==
- George Hunter (†2023)
  Founded the George Watson’s College Boat Club in 1958 and ran it as an unpaid volunteer until 1994. Under his stewardship the club established its junior pathway and produced multiple national champions. He was awarded an OBE in 1980 for services to sport and served on the Scottish Amateur Rowing Association executive for over five decades.
- Jim Ferguson
  Served as Head Coach through the 2000s and early‑2010s. During his tenure the club provided athletes for Scotland Home International teams and saw numerous junior selections for the World Rowing Junior and U23 Championships (e.g. Andrew Holmes). The programme also achieved annual victories at the British Rowing Junior Championships, holding the J16 4+ and WJ18 8+ records.
- Evelyn Ferguson
  Assistant Head Coach during Jim Ferguson’s tenure. Evelyn played a crucial role in athlete development and logistical support, contributing to the club’s consistent performances at domestic and international level.
- Jason Foster
  Succeeded Jim Ferguson and led the club until 2019. Under his guidance, the club qualified its first junior eight for Henley Royal Regatta, being eliminated by Radley College by a large margin.
- Matthew Mole
  Appointed Head Coach in 2019, Mole led George Watson’s College Boat Club to significant achievements. In 2021, the club's junior quad qualified for the Fawley Challenge Cup at Henley Royal Regatta, defeating Hereford Cathedral School in the first round. They were subsequently eliminated by Windsor Boys' School, who progressed to the finals. In 2022, the club's quad once again qualified for the Fawley Challenge Cup, securing a victory over York City Rowing Club in the first round before being knocked out by Kingston Rowing Club.
- Adam Johnston (Acting)
  A former Watsonian rower, Johnston has long served as a coach at George Watson’s College Boat Club and temporarily stepped up as Acting Head Coach in 2022. During his time as a student, he competed in various events, including the Open Junior Under 16 Single Scull at the 2009 Strathclyde Park Regatta, finishing with a time of 9:34.96. While not achieving top podium finishes, Johnston's dedication and understanding of the sport led him to make a significant impact as a coach, focusing on developing the technical skills and discipline of young rowers during his tenure.
- Hamish Burrell (Current)
  Appointed Head Coach (listed in club’s key people) and former GB ‘Start’ lead coach. He talent‑identified and coached Katherine Grainger to U23 World Championship gold in 1997 and subsequent Olympic medals, and served as a GB Rowing Team coach (Women’s Pair) at the Tokyo 2020 Olympics.

== Club captains ==
George Watson’s College Boat Club captains
Year	Captain(s)
2021	Seb Ansell and Honey Hughes
2022	Kate Skirving and James Martin
2023	Lachlan Uttley and Emma Steele
2024	Scarlett Conn and Finlay Ellis
2025	Harris Skirving and Rebecca Millar
2026	Ezra Ferguson
2027	James Palmer and Alva Clements

== See also ==
- Scottish Rowing
- British Rowing
