= Maidenhead Rowing Club =

British rowing club

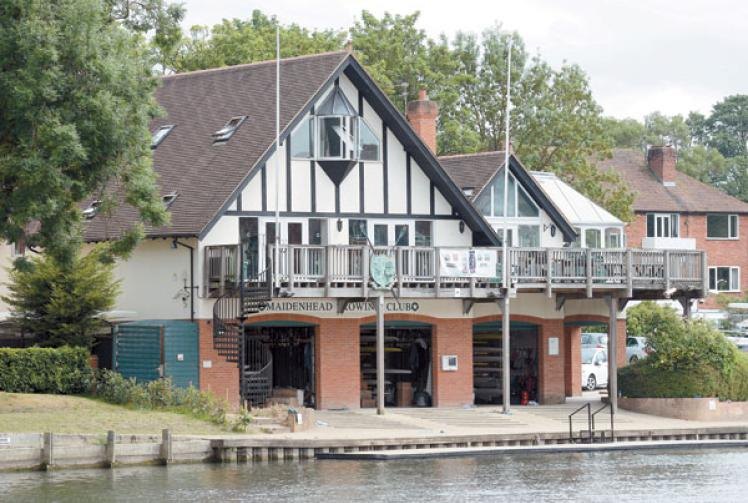

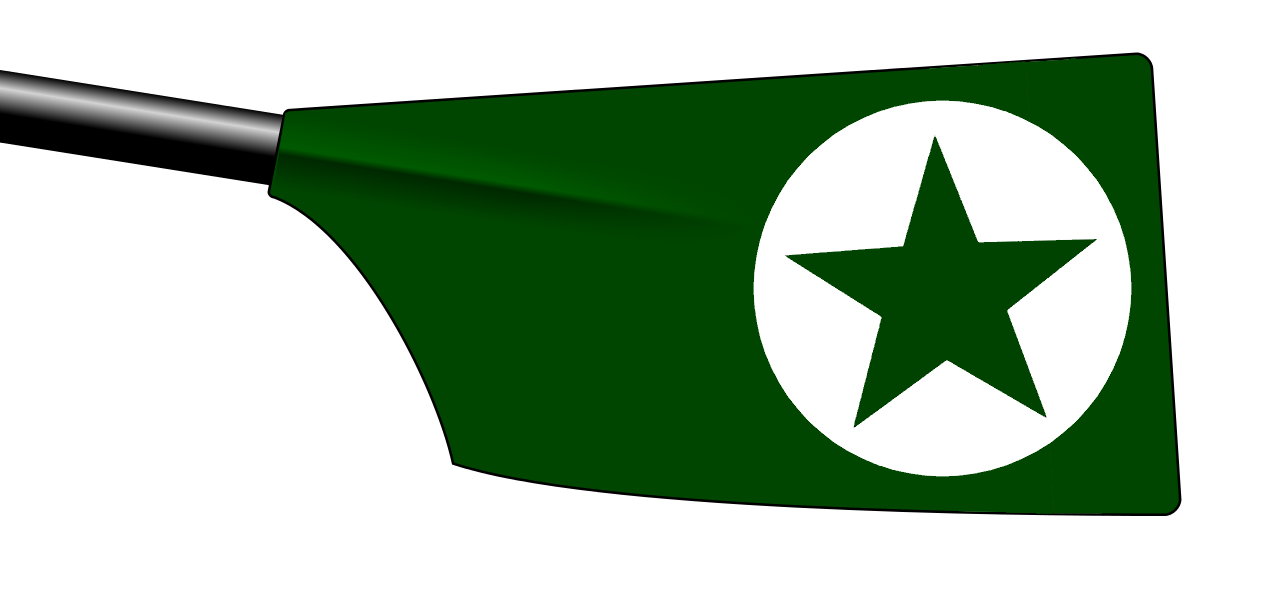
- Motto: "Manu Forti"
- Location: Maidenhead, Berkshire, United Kingdom
- Coordinates: 51.5225°N 0.7000°W
- Home water: Bray Lock, River Thames
- Founded: 1876
- Affiliations: British Rowing boat code - MHD
- Website: www.maidenheadrc.org.uk

Events
- Maidenhead Regatta; Maidenhead Junior Regatta

Distinctions
- Henley Royal Regatta; Olympic Games; National Championships

Notable members
- Bert Bushnell, William Grenfell

Maidenhead Rowing Club is a rowing club, on the River Thames in England at Maidenhead, Berkshire.

The clubhouse is on the reach above Bray Lock on the Maidenhead bank of the Thames between Maidenhead Railway Bridge and Maidenhead Bridge. The club regularly races at local and national events with considerable success.

The club's colours are Brunswick green and white, and its symbol is a five-pointed star. There is also a coat of arms used on the club's blazer badges, which features a shield with a five-pointed star on one half, and a 'Maiden's head' on the other half, with a pair of crossed oars and arm above it, and the words 'Manu Forti' ("strong arm") below it.

== History ==
Early years

The earliest record of rowing in Maidenhead is from July 5, 1839, where a regatta was held on the Cliveden Reach several weeks after the first-ever Henley Regatta. Two boats from Maidenhead competed for the Town Cup for four-oared boats - the 'Star' and the 'Lady of the Lake'.

The following year, 'The Star' club from Maidenhead entered the District Challenge Cup at Henley Regatta. The crew was formed of W. Skindle, H. Fuller, G. Robinson, J. Brown(s) and W. Brown(c) (given the time period, W. Skindle can safely be assumed to be William Skindle, who was the founder of the infamous Skindles hotel in Maidenhead). They were beaten in the first round by the 'Albion' club from Henley.

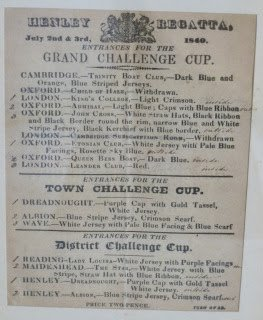
The programme for Henley Regatta, 1840. 'The Star' from Maidenhead is entered in the District fours event, since discontinued.

Very little is known about 'The Star' rowing club, and after this inaugural appearance at Henley, this club seemed to disappear, and no known rowing club existed between 1840 and 1876. Regattas were held in Maidenhead over this time period - in fact the first rowing almanac gives details of a regatta held in Maidenhead in 1860, and some sources cite that regattas were held annually from 1839 to 1850. Crews and scullers from Maidenhead did compete at various regattas during this intermittent time period, but never seemed to belong to a particular rowing club.

Club formation

In 1876, a letter to the Maidenhead Advertiser questioned why a town with such proximity to the river did not have a rowing club or an annual regatta.

"To the editor.

SIR - The well-timed suggestion of your "Local Looker-on" that Maidenhead should have a Town Boating Club is certainly in great part practicable. The members of the Early Closing Association might possibly form such a club, but their only opportunities to practice would be Thursday evenings, and they would probably struggle in preparing a really good crew, and sending them to Marlow or Henley. There is no reason, however, why the many young men in Maidenhead who have both time and means at their disposal should not organise such a club. Indeed, the only wonder is that they have not done it long ago. Many times I have heard visitors express their surprise that Maidenhead, a town for which the river has done so much, should have so little to do for itself. This remark is surely justified by the fact that our river-side town has neither Flower Show nor Regatta. Hoping that you will bring public opinion to bear on this matter.

I am, Sir, yours truly.

AN EMPLOYER"

In response, a group of individuals amassed at the Bear Hotel in Maidenhead, and later in the town hall, with the intention of forming a rowing club. Those present were as follows: Mr Hall-Say, Alderman Durrant, and Messrs Jeffries, H. Clark, Bennett, J.D. Broome, Hammond, J. Burnham, W. Clark, J. Fuller, Baines, Lester, E. Hewitt, Puttick, F. Burnham, Tapley, Britton, Shrewsbury, Jackson, Davey, H. Woodhouse, Blackbow, Baylis, Beal and Aldridge. Club rules and constitution were established, which included references to amateurism (i.e. no member shall row for money prizes etc.) which were in line with what other clubs had at the time. The club colours were originally maroon and gold, but an unknown time later (late 1800s, early 1900s) became the current colours and a five-pointed star became the symbol of the club - presumably a connection was made between the town's original rowing club and the current one and the symbol was 'reinstated'. An annual regatta organised by the club was immediately established and came to be a popular event.

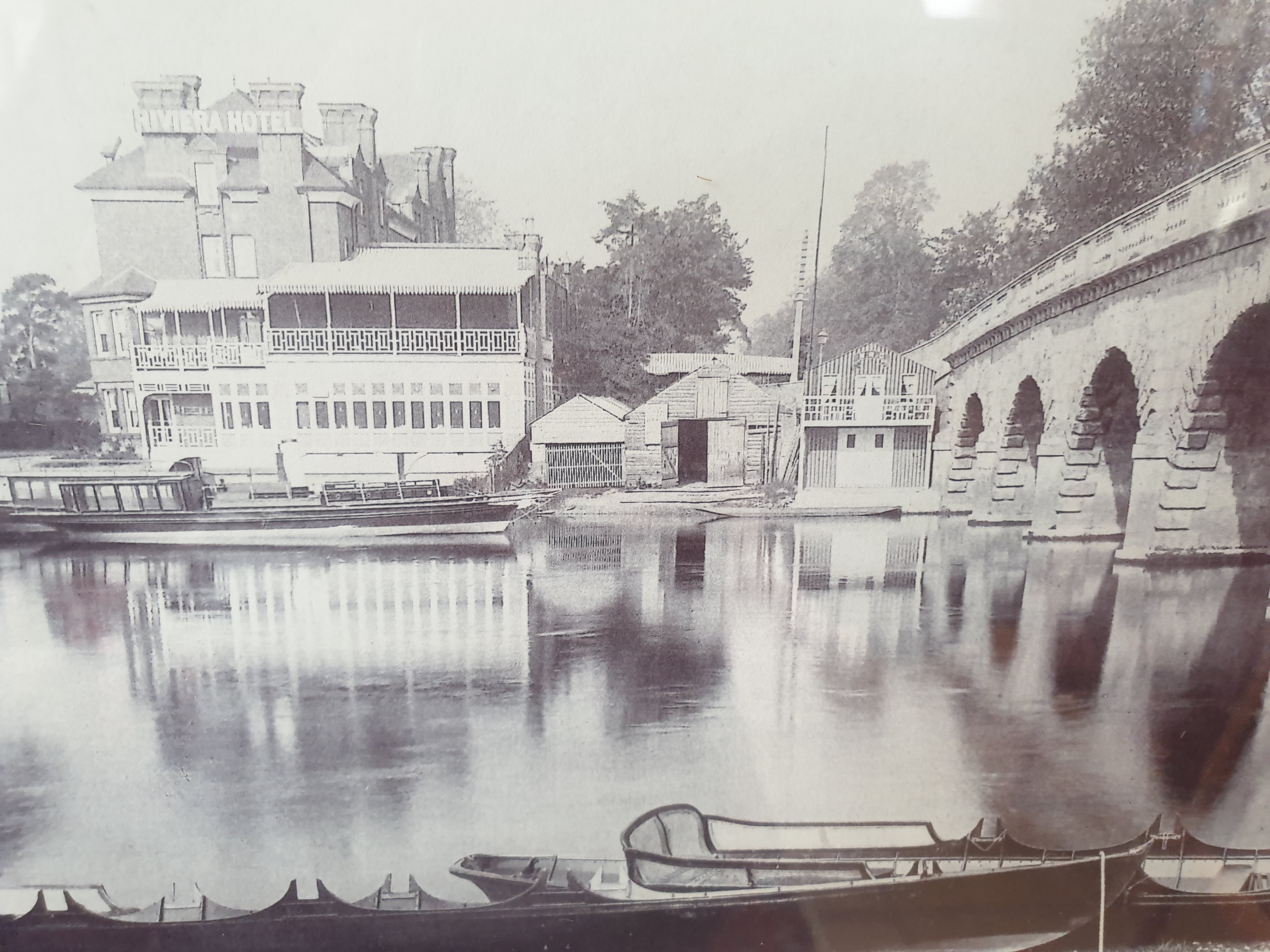
The original Maidenhead R.C. clubhouse, sandwiched between the Thames Riviera Hotel and Maidenhead Bridge (photo taken in 1893).

The club struggled with success in its first few years, entering the Town Challenge Cup at the Henley Royal Regatta in 1878 and 1883, being quickly eliminated. A four had considerable success at local regattas in the late 1890s, and these came more and more often as the club developed.

1900–present

The first big victory for the club came in 1924, where the crew of; R.G. Jackson(b), H.G.E. Woods, J.G. Barley, H.J. Fowlie, S.A. Quarterman, R.R. Waterer, W. Boulton, J.H. Waizeneker(s), A.E. Grenn (c), coached by Capt. H. Booth-Mason won the Thames Challenge Cup at Henley, after a similar crew lost in the final of the same event in 1923. A similar crew then raced the Grand Challenge Cup in 1925, and lost out to London Rowing Club by a mere 5 feet.

The success in 1924 prompted for the club to extend its premises. The clubhouse before this was a very small building, with a shed adjacent to it presumably used to store boats. In 1926, Jack Arnold led the construction of a much bigger boathouse adjacent to the original clubhouse - both were sandwiched between Maidenhead Bridge and the Thames Riviera Hotel. This boathouse would serve the club well into the end of the century.

A second win at Henley came in 1939, where a coxless four featuring; B.C.D. Eastick(b), F.L. Ashton, J.G. Bissett, A.J. Lion(s), coached by S.A. Quarterman, took the Wyfold Challenge Cup, beating Tigre Boat Club, Argentina in the final. This win proved exceptionally popular, as it was one of the few events that year that was won by an English crew. Aubrey Lion, who stroked the four, became president of the club in 1977.

At the 1948 Olympics in London, the club's Bert Bushnell teamed up with Leander Club's Richard Burnell to win the double sculls. Their journey to this gold medal, which saw them put together by Jack Beresford only six weeks before the games and included overcoming physical differences in the boat and social differences outside the boat, was retold in the 2012 BBC drama Bert and Dickie. Bushnell was an accomplished sculler, who represented the club well to win the Wingfield Sculls in 1947, as well as finishing runner-up in the Diamond Challenge Sculls at Henley in 1948, a result that ultimately led to him being selected to race the Olympic double as opposed to the single.

Post-war, the club was almost annually putting out entries to Henley and other large events, such as the Head of the River Race, as well as more local events.

In the mid 1970s, the club admitted its first female member - Laura Lion (née Jenkinson). The rules of the club had to be changed for her to be admitted. Joining as a junior, Laura experienced a successful career in rowing, and is an active member of the club even in the present day. The club is now equally represented in both genders.

Further Henley successes came in the 1980s, when the club experienced a golden age of sorts. Eric Sims won the Double Sculls Challenge Cup with Steve Redgrave from Marlow in 1981, and represented Great Britain several times. The Queen Mother Challenge Cup was won in 1984 in a composite with Bewdley. The crew was composed of E.R. Sims(b), J.P. Lawther, J. Ferris, J. Spencer-Jones(s)(Bewdley), coached by Derek Cook. The club's last non-composite win came in 1985, where M.W. Harlow(b), C.A. Shawcross, E.R. Sims, J.P. Lawther(s), Z. Barker(c) and Derek Cook (coach) won the Britannia Challenge Cup. The streak of Henley wins were accompanied by countless wins at the National Championships and a selection of club members representing Great Britain at senior and junior world championships. The last win at Henley for many years came from a composite crew of Maidenhead (B. Webb) and Windsor Boys' School in 1992, in the Fawley Challenge Cup.

The success of the 1980s prompted a desire to move to newer premises, with a bigger clubhouse to accommodate the ever-growing membership, and to replace the old clubhouse, which was in poor condition. A huge effort was made by many of the club members in order to secure the funding and planning permission for the new boathouse, including the bid for lottery funding. In 1998 the members of the club moved into a newly built clubhouse, opened by Steve Redgrave. The new building was able to house many more members, boats, and facilities. Membership has more than quadrupled since the move.

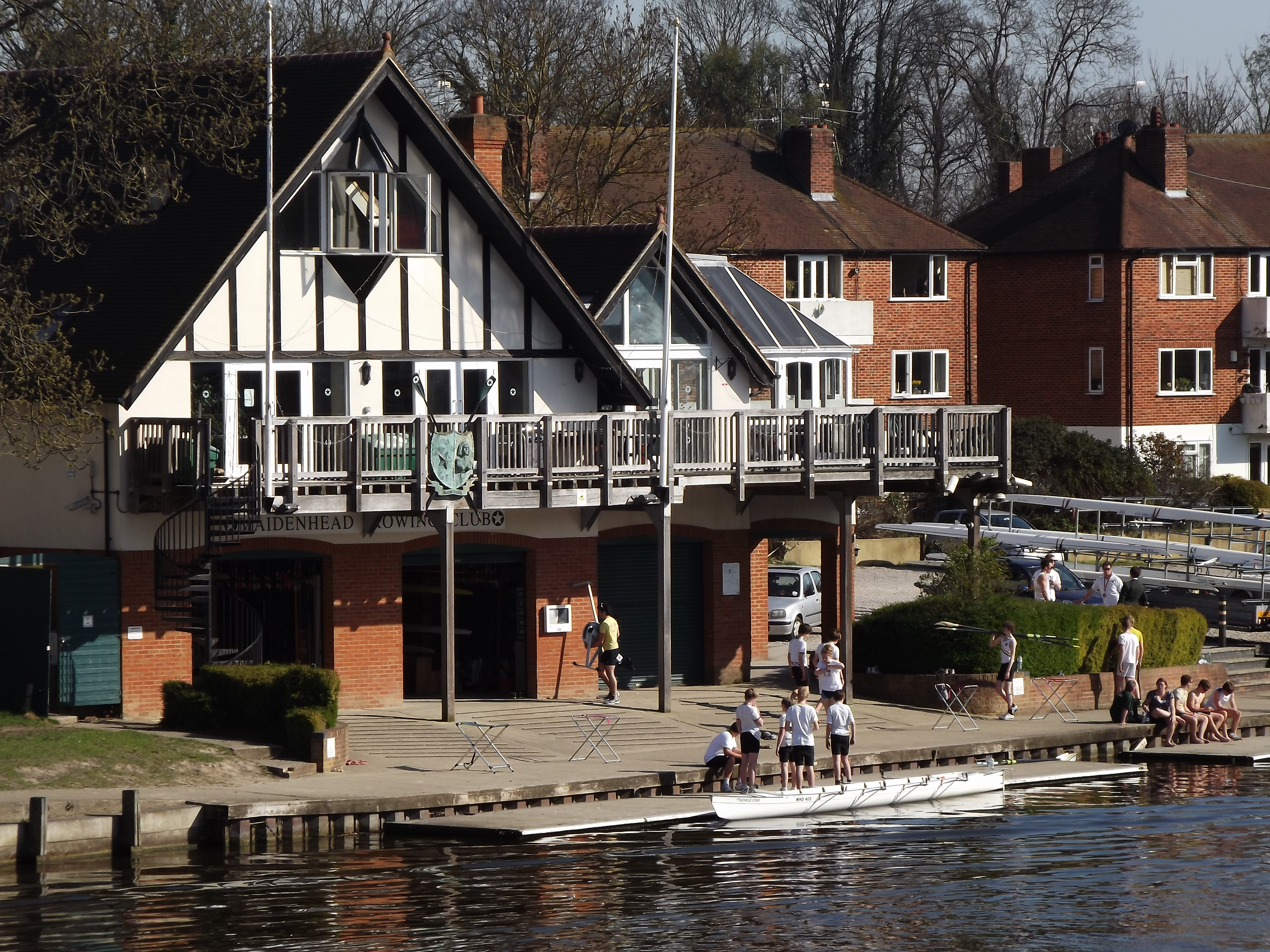
The club's current clubhouse, built 1998 with frontage completed in 1999. Three boat bays are used to store boats inside, with additional racks outside the boathouse. On the first floor are the bar, function room and gym and on the indoor rowing facilities are on the top floor.

The new clubhouse and capacity for more membership allowed the club's junior section to flourish. National titles continued to be won, and in 2007 the club had its last Henley win thus far, with P. Clapp taking the Fawley Challenge Cup in a composite with Henley R.C.. Since the win, junior quads from Maidenhead reached the Fawley semi-finals twice (2013 & 2017) and the final in 2018. In 2015 the club won the Victor Ludorum at the British Junior Rowing Championships. Countless national titles/medals and GB Junior representations decorate many of the club's current and alumni members. In recent years wins at Henley Women's Regatta and the Schools Head of the River were also achieved. Maidenhead has been the starting club for more recently successful athletes such as Rob Williams, who won silver in the LM4- at the London 2012 Olympics, and Jack Beaumont, Rio 2016 Olympic finalist.

In 2018, adaptive rowing was introduced at the rowing club, complete with accessible facilities and a small squad for current adaptive athletes.

Since then, the club has seen increased success in its junior squad. The club qualified a women's crew to Henley Royal Regatta for the first time in 2024 with qualification for the Diamond Jubilee Challenge Cup In 2025, Maidenhead made the semi-final of the Diamond Jubilee Challenge Cup at Henley Royal Regatta. Later that year, Fraser Jones of Maidenhead Rowing Club competed for Great Britain at the Coupe de la Jeunesse where he achieved a gold and silver medal.

== Notable members ==
Notable past club members include Bert Bushnell, winner of the Wingfield Sculls in 1947 and so far the club's only Olympic gold medallist, winning gold at the 1948 Olympic Games in London in a double with Richard Burnell. William Grenfell, also known as Lord Desborough, was the club's first captain and a very noteworthy individual who among other things competed in the only dead heat Boat Race in 1877, rowed the English channel, served as Mayor of Maidenhead and was chairman of the British Olympic Association.

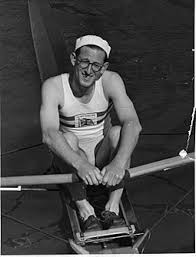
Bert Bushnell in a single scull.

== Events ==
The club hosts the Maidenhead Junior Regatta in the spring, and the Maidenhead Regatta in the summer, both of which attract hundreds of entries from clubs all over the region and even from across the country. The races are 500m upstream on the Bray Reach, finishing by the steps just south of Maidenhead Railway Bridge, although in 2007 the summer regatta was briefly relocated to Dorney Lake due to poor river conditions. Maidenhead Junior Regatta is unique to other local regattas in that it is aimed at young juniors with little or no racing experience, and allows them to race more than once by way of a repechage system, where if a crew loses their first race, they are able to race again and potentially still make the final instead of being knocked out outright. The summer regatta is aimed at more experienced racers, with a traditional knock-out progression system. It is rich in its history, being organised by the club since its formation every year from 1876 (except in wartime), and being raced as early as 1839.

== Honours ==
=== Recent British champions ===
Year	Winning crew/s
2009	Open J17 1x, Open J15 1x, Women J16 2x
2013	Open J18 4x, Open J15 2x
2014	Open J16 2x, Open J14 1x, Women J18 4x
2015	Victor Ludorum, Open J15 1x, Women J16 2x, Women J14 4x+
2016	Open J16 1x, Open J16 2x, Women J15 4x+
2019	Open J15 2x, Women J16 1x, Women J15 2x

=== Henley Royal Regatta ===
Year	Races won
1924	Thames Challenge Cup
1939	Wyfold Challenge Cup
1981	Double Sculls Challenge Cup
1984	Queen Mother Challenge Cup
1985	Britannia Challenge Cup
1994	Fawley Challenge Cup
2007	Fawley Challenge Cup

== See also ==
- Rowing on the River Thames
