= Clydesdale Amateur Rowing Club =

Scottish rowing club

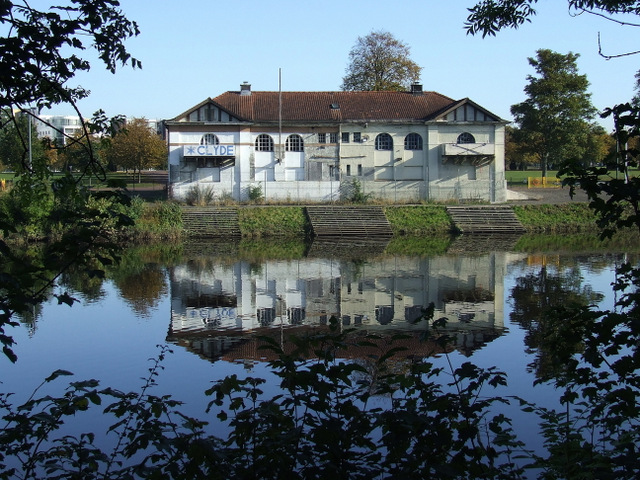

- Location: Glasgow Green, Glasgow, Scotland
- Coordinates: 55.851823°N 4.243802°W
- Home water: River Clyde
- Founded: 1857
- Affiliations: Scottish Rowing
- Website: www.clydesdalearc.org.uk

Events
- Clydesdale Sculler's Head; Clydesdale Four's and Eight's Head

Clydesdale Amateur Rowing Club (abbreviated to Clydesdale ARC, or CARC) is a rowing club, located on the River Clyde in the centre of Glasgow. It is successful each year in many events at the Scottish Rowing Championships and is affiliated to Scottish Rowing.

== History ==
Clydesdale Amateur Rowing Club was officially formed in 1857, however, significant evidence exists to indicate that the club was first formed in 1856; the first club annual report, dated to 1856, identifies the formation of the club as occurring “in a small meeting, convened in Steele’s Coffee-Room, where, with Arethusa Albert Small Esq. as chairman, your secretary moved, the creation of an humble rowing club”. It was originally named the Clydesdale Gentlemen Amateur Rowing Club. Furthermore on 7 June 1856 the club were given the patronage of the annual Flag Regatta of the City of Glasgow Regatta Club and participated in several events including the Glasgow Royal Regatta in August 1856.

Rangers Football Club were formed by four founders of the rowing club – brothers Moses McNeil and Peter McNeil, Peter Campbell and William McBeath – who met at West End Park (now known as Kelvingrove Park) in March 1872. Rangers' first match, in May that year, was a goalless friendly draw with Callander on Flesher's Haugh situated on Glasgow Green.

The club won two national titles at the 2024 British Rowing Championships and the 2025 British Rowing Club Championships.

== Boathouse ==
The club currently resides in the eastern half of The West Boathouse on Glasgow Green, sharing the building with Clyde Amateur Rowing Club. Due to the limited size of the West Boathouse, the club also uses the East Boathouse, situated 400m upriver, to house their eights, as well as boats for Glasgow Schools Rowing Club.

The current boathouse is a category B listed building. It contains two medium boat bays: the riverside one is barely long enough for shorter coxless fours, and is used to store one of these, along with the club's doubles and Aldens. The other bay is for the fours and singles, with singles being stored in a system with two singles per shelf. Access to the boathouse is from the path on Glasgow Green, the bay doors face east onto the asphalted forecourt, with steps onto the river along the south side of the boathouse, which are shared with Clyde.

The female changing rooms are also on the ground floor, the top floor contains male changing rooms, a tearoom, and the gym in which the Concept 2 Ergometers, and weights equipment are stored. Access to the balcony is also from this floor. There is also an attic in which Club belongings and equipment are kept.

=== Boats ===
The clubs boat-fleet consists mainly of British Janouseks, as well as some newer Stämpfli boats. In Autumn 2009 a used Stämpfli 8 was delivered ("Cruachan"), as well as a new Coxless Quad ("Islay"). A Filippi F41 Eight (named "Ben y Vrackie" after a hill outside Pitlochry) was bought with financial help from Henry Abram and Sons Ltd, Awards for All Scotland, the Sports Council for Glasgow and Culture and Sport Glasgow.

There are also two other Stämpfli fours, most other boats are Janousek. The majority of boats are built for scull and sweep rigging for versatility, also necessary due to the limited boat racking space, meaning the total number of boats is limited.

== Notable Members ==
Severin Nielsen (born 2002) and Matthew Fielding (born 2001) are Scottish elite rowers who represented Scotland in the quadruple sculls at the 2019 Home International Regatta. Community Development Officer, Miki Lee Dale, was awarded sportscotland’s ‘Young Person’s Coach of the Year’ in 2017. Former rowers include Gillian Lindsay and Karen Bennett.

== Colours ==
Club colours are Royal Blue. The blades are Royal Blue with a white cross spanning the height and breadth of the blades. A previous design was Royal Blue with two vertical white stripes towards the end of the blade, which can still be seen on some private blades. The one-piece is also Royal Blue with a double white-stripe along each side. (A former design had a white upper and blue lower part to the one-piece, however this was changed.)

== Events ==
The Club is involved in organising a few races throughout the year, most notably the Clydesdale Sculler's Head every October, the largest Scottish single's head race, in which doubles can also race in a separate division since 2007.

There is also the Clydesdale Four's and Eight's Head, as well as the Corporate Regatta where companies can send teams to learn to row and then compete, which is both a source of income and new members.

Clydesdale Summer Regatta is held annually in May.

== Honours ==
=== British champions ===
Year	Winning crew/s
1985	Women L4-
1989	Men 8+
1995	Women U23 1x
1999	Women 1x, Women L1x
2003	Women L4x
2006	W 2-
2010	Open J17 1x, Open J15 4x+
2012	W U23 1x
2013	Open J14 1x
2016	Open J18 1x
2024	Open Lwt 1x, W J15 4x+
2025	Open Lwt 1x, W J15 4x+
