= 2002 British Rowing Championships =

Rowing competition in the United Kingdom

- Venue: National Water Sports Centre
- Location: Holme Pierrepont (Nottingham)
- Dates: 19–21 July 2002

The 2002 British Rowing Championships known as the National Championships at the time, were the 31st edition of the National Championships, held from 19–21 July 2002 at the National Water Sports Centre in Holme Pierrepont, Nottingham. They were organised and sanctioned by British Rowing, and are open to British rowers. A record 822 crews competed at the event.

== Senior ==
=== Medal summary ===
Event	Gold	Silver	Bronze
Men 1x	Nottingham Britannia; Richard Ockendon	John O'Gaunt; Richard Shirley	NCRA; Giles Monnickendam
Men 2-	London	Worcester	Nautilus
Men 2x	NCRA	Tideway Scullers School	Grosvenor / Royal Chester
Men 2+	Upper Thames	Cambridge '99	N/A
Men 4-	Nautilus	Worcester	Thames
Men 4x	Leander; Pete Gosling	Marlow / Bath University	Maidstone Invicta
Men 4+	NCRA	Imperial College	Worcester
Men 8+	Oxford Brookes University	Leander	Molesey
Women 1x	Wallingford; Elizabeth Butler-Stoney	Loughborough; E Clarke	Durham University; Scott
Women 2x	Wallingford	Warwick / Worcester	Loughborough
Women 2-	Marlow / Imperial College	Osiris	Upper Thames
Women 4x	Nautilus	Marlow / NCRA / Tideway Scullers School / Upper Thames	York City / Avon County / Lady Eleanor Holles School
Women 4-	Nautilus	Bedford High School / Durham / Headington School	Kingston
Women 4+	Oxford Brookes University	City of Oxford	St Andrew / Clydesdale / Thames
Women 8+	Thames / Wallingford / Globe / London	Thames	Aberdeen / Clydesdale / Castle Semple

== Lightweight ==
=== Medal summary ===
Event	Gold	Silver	Bronze
Men L1x	Tideway Scullers School	St Andrew	George Watson's
Men L2x	Tideway Scullers School / Putney Town	Walton	London
Men L2-	Stourport / Upper Thames	Aberdeen University	St Andrew / Edinburgh University
Men L4-	NCRA A	Furnivall SC	NCRA B
Men L4x	Leander / Cambridge University	Tideway Scullers School / Northampton / Royal Chester	London / London University
Women L1x	Peterborough City	NCRA	Star Club
Women L2x	Thames Tradesmen's	NCRA	Marlow / Wallingford
Women L2-	Thames	Upper Thames	Nottingham
Women L4x	Marlow / NCRA / Tideway Scullers School / Upper Thames	Kingston	Thames Tradesmen's
Women L4-	Kingston	Thames / Marlow / Wallingford	Nottingham / Nottingham University

== Coastal ==
=== Medal summary ===
Event	Gold	Silver	Bronze
Men 1x	Southampton Coalporters	Southsea	BTC Southampton
Men 2-	Dover	Worthing	Ryde
Men 4+	Christchurch	Ryde	BTC Southampton

== U 23 ==
=== Medal summary ===
Event	Gold	Silver	Bronze
Men 1x	Aberdeen University	Cambridge University	NCRA

== Junior ==
=== Medal summary ===
Event	Gold	Silver	Bronze
Men 1x	NCRA	Durham	Worcester
Men 2-	Northwich	Aberdeen Schools	Nithsdale
Men 2x	Peterborough City	Windsor Boys' School	Evesham
Men 4-	Bedford School	Emanuel School / Tiffin	Yarm School
Men 4x	King's School Chester	Hampton School / Molesey	Royal Chester
Men 4+	Aberdeen Schools	Westminster School	St Paul's School
Men J16 1x	Lancaster RGS	NCRA	Evesham
Men J16 2-	Hampton	Abingdon School	St Leonard's School
Men J16 2x	George Watson's	St Neots	Monmouth Comprehensive
Men J16 4-	Canford School	St George's College	Yarm School
Men J16 4+	St George's College	Maidenhead	RGS Worcester
Men J16 4x	King's School Chester	Reading	Yarm School
Men J15 1x	Tideway Scullers School	Runcorn	Shiplake College
Men J15 2x	Marlow	Peterborough City	Evesham
Men J15 4x+	RGS Worcester	Kingston Grammar School	Hereford / Evesham / St Neots
Men J14 1x	Maidenhead	Monmouth	Thames Tradesmen's
Men J14 2x	Maidenhead	Newark	St Leonard's School
Men J14 4x+	Yarm School	Thames Tradesmen's	Reading Blue Coat School
Women 1x	Dame Alice Harpur	Molesey	Avon County
Women 2-	Westminster School	Aberdeen Schools	Burton Leander
Women 2x	Royal Chester	Dame Alice Harpur	Marlow
Women 4-	Kingston Grammar School	Lady Eleanor Holles School	St Leonard's School
Women 4x	Dame Alice Harpur	Henley	Northwich
Women 4+	St Paul's Girls' School / Westminster School	Headington School	St Leonard's School
Women 8+	King's School Worcester	Haberdasher's Monmouth Girls	Headington School
Women J16 1x	Dame Alice Harpur	Marlow	George Watson's
Women J16 2x	Marlow	Reading	Tideway Scullers School
Women J16 4+	Haberdasher's Monmouth Girls A	Dame Alice Harpur	Haberdasher's Monmouth Girls B
Women J16 4x	Henley	Wycliffe College	George Watson's
Women J15 1x	Reading	Sir William Borlase	Queen Elizabeth HS
Women J15 2x	Wycliffe College	Henley	Newark
Women J15 4x+	Henley	Sir William Borlase	St Leonard's School
Women J14 1x	Nithsdale	George Watson's	Durham
Women J14 2x	Evesham	Newark	Upper Thames
Women J14 4x+	Headington School	Molesey	Reading

Key

Symbol	meaning
1, 2, 4, 8	crew size
+	coxed
-	coxless
x	sculls
14	Under-14
15	Under-15
16	Under-16
J	Junior
