= 2004 British Rowing Championships =

- Venue: National Water Sports Centre
- Location: Holme Pierrepont (Nottingham)
- Dates: 16–18 July 2004

The 2004 British Rowing Championships known as the National Championships at the time, were the 33rd edition of the National Championships, held from 16–18 July 2004 at the National Water Sports Centre in Holme Pierrepont, Nottingham. They were organised and sanctioned by British Rowing, and are open to British rowers.

== Senior ==
=== Medal summary ===
Event	Gold	Silver	Bronze
Open 1x	Glasgow; Alistair Warnock	Tideway Scullers School	Molesey
Open 2-	London	Oxford Brookes University	London University
Open 2x	NCRA	Molesey	Royal Chester / Grosvenor
Open 4-	London	Worcester	Army
Open 4x	Leander	Reading / London University / Newcastle University	Vesta / Tideway Scullers School / Molesey
Open 4+	Molesey	Imperial College / Molesey	Oxford Brookes University
Open 8+	Imperial College / Molesey	Oxford Brookes University	Army
Women 1x	Glasgow; Lindsay Dick	Kingston	London University
Women 2x	Sunderland	London University	Rebecca
Women 2-	Thames / Globe	Oxford Brookes University / Osiris	Osiris B
Women 4x	London University	Durham University	Molesey
Women 4-	City of Oxford; Christine Aherne, Katy Day, Amy Jackson, Rachel Urwin	Marlow	Furnivall SC
Women 4+	Thames	Auriol Kensington	Furnivall SC
Women 8+	Thames	Star & Arrow / Vesta	Osiris

== Lightweight ==
=== Medal summary ===
Event	Gold	Silver	Bronze
Open L1x	Leander	London	Wallingford
Open L2x	Leander / Aberdeen University	Glasgow University	Upper Thames
Open L2-	NCRA	London	Nottingham
Open L4-	NCRA	London A	London B
Open L4x	NCRA	Tideway Scullers School	London / Walton
Women L1x	Mortlake Anglian & Alpha	Bewl Bridge	Clydesdale
Women L2x	Wallingford	Mortlake Anglian & Alpha	Thames
Women L2-	Auriol Kensington	Nottingham University	London
Women L4x	London	Wallingford / Thames	Mortlake Anglian & Alpha
Women L4-	City of Oxford	Rob Roy	St Andrew

== U 23 ==
=== Medal summary ===
Event	Gold	Silver	Bronze
Open 1x	Rebecca	Tideway Scullers School	Nottingham University
Women 1x	London University	Henley	University of York

== Coastal ==
=== Medal summary ===
Event	Gold	Silver	Bronze
Open 1x	Westover & Bournemouth B	Westover & Bournemouth A	Itchen Imperial RC
Open 4x	BTC (Southampton)	Christchurch	Dover

== Junior ==
=== Medal summary ===
Event	Gold	Silver	Bronze
Open J18 1x	Northwich	Tideway Scullers School	Hereford
Open J18 2-	Nautics	St Leonard's School	Bedford School
Open J18 2x	Stourport	Walton / Burway	Talkin Tarn
Open J18 4-	Bedford School	RGS Worcester	Cheltenham / St Edward's / King's College School / Monmouth
Open J18 4x	King's School Chester	Upper Thames	Dulwich College / Marlow / Windsor Boys' School
Open J18 4+	Abingdon School	Bedford Modern School	Bedford School
Open J16 1x	Stourport	Walton	Queen Elizabeth HS
Open J16 2-	St Leonard's School	Bedford Modern School	Abingdon School
Open J16 2x	Upper Thames	York City	Monmouth
Open J16 4-	Abingdon School	Dulwich College	N/A
Open J16 4+	Bedford Modern School	Abingdon School	Latymer Upper School
Open J16 4x	Tiffin School	Royal Docks / Walton	Star Club / Oundle School
Open J15 1x	Walton	Glasgow	Yarm School
Open J15 2x	Tideway Scullers School	Merchant Taylors School	Peterborough City
Open J15 4x+	St Leonard's School	Windsor Boys' School	Henley
Open J14 1x	Walton	Durham	Walton
Open J14 2x	Grange School	Merchant Taylors School	George Watson's
Open J14 4x+	Windsor Boys' School	Claires Court School	Bradford Gram. / Tyne
Women J18 1x	Molesey	St.Peters School	Durham
Women J18 2-	Henley	Reading / St Edward's School	Worcester
Women J18 2x	Avon County	Weybridge Ladies	Wycliffe Sculling Cent
Women J18 4-	Reading / St Edward's	Henley	St Leonard's School
Women J18 4x	Avon County / St Neots / Weybridge Ladies	Wycliffe Sculling Cent	Canford School / Exeter
Women J18 4+	Haberdasher's Monmouth Girls	George Heriot's School	Stratford-upon-Avon
Women J18 8+	King's School Worcester	St Paul's Girls' School	Gloucester
Women J16 1x	St.Peters School	Nithsdale	Canford School
Women J16 2x	Newark	Reading	Durham / Queen Elizabeth HS
Women J16 4+	Henley	Aberdeen Schools	Evesham
Women J16 4x	Calpe	Worcester	Molesey
Women J15 1x	Gloucester	Lea	Bedford High School
Women J15 2x	Maidenhead	Hollingworth Lake	Northwich
Women J15 4x+	St Leonard's School	Stourport	Monmouth Comprehensive
Women J14 1x	St Neots	Peterborough City	Castle Semple
Women J14 2x	Queen Elizabeth HS	Maidstone Invicta	Warrington
Women J14 4x+	Maidenhead	Evesham	Henley

Key

Symbol	meaning
1, 2, 4, 8	crew size
+	coxed
-	coxless
x	sculls
14	Under-14
15	Under-15
16	Under-16
J	Junior
