= 1998 British Rowing Championships =

- Venue: Strathclyde Country Park
- Location: Motherwell, North Lanarkshire
- Dates: 17–19 July 1998

The 1998 British Rowing Championships known as the National Championships at the time, were the 27th edition of the National Championships, held from 17 to 19 July 1998 at the Strathclyde Country Park in Motherwell, North Lanarkshire. They were organised and sanctioned by British Rowing, and are open to British rowers.

== Senior ==
=== Medal summary ===
Event	Gold	Silver	Bronze
Men 1x	Molesey; Greg Searle	Tideway Scullers School; Mike Webb	Leander; Richard Briscoe
Men 2-	Leander	London	Castle Semple
Men 2x	Castle Semple / Glasgow	Kingston	London
Men 2+	Upper Thames	Molesey / Queen's Tower	Cambridge '99
Men 4-	NCRA	Nottingham	Worcester
Men 4x	Isis / London / Rob Roy / Queen's Tower	Kingston / Queen Elizabeth HS / Walton / Wycliffe College	Bewl Bridge
Men 4+	NCRA	Kingston / Molesey	Worcester
Men 8+	Scullers Moseley Composite; Greg Searle	Nottingham	London University
Women 1x	St Andrew; Katherine Grainger	London University; Melindi Myers	Rob Roy; Sarah Springman
Women 2x	King's School Canterbury / Tideway Scullers School	Derby	NCRA
Women 2-	Upper Thames	Army	Hereford
Women 4x	King's School Canterbury / Tideway Scullers School/Kingston / Headington School	NCRA	Marlow
Women 4-	Upper Thames	Marlow	Edinburgh University/Tideway Scullers School
Women 4+	Kingston/Imperial College/Thames/Marlow	Marlow	Thames Tradesmen's
Women 8+	Thames	Upper Thames	Army/Thames

== Lightweight ==
=== Medal summary ===
Event	Gold	Silver	Bronze
Men L1x	Leander	Stirling	London University
Men L2x	Tideway Scullers School/London University	Leander	Stourport
Men L2-	Upper Thames	Glasgow / Loch Lomond	Caius Boat Club / Clydesdale
Men L4-	Clyde	Nottingham	London
Men L4x	Leander	Maidenhead/Marlow/Upper Thames	Walton
Men L8	Nottingham	London	N/A
Women L1x	Wallingford	Kingston	Thames
Women L2x	Upper Thames	Marlow	Tideway Scullers School
Women L2-	Globe	Upper Thames	Star Club
Women L4-	Upper Thames	Nottingham	Edinburgh University / Tideway Scullers School

== U 23 ==
=== Medal summary ===
Event	Gold	Silver	Bronze
Men 1x	Stirling	Nottingham	Tideway Scullers School
Women 1x	Norwich	Peterborough City	Trafford

== Junior ==
=== Medal summary ===
Event	Gold	Silver	Bronze
Men 1x	Stirling	Exeter	Star Club
Men 2-	Bedford Modern School	RGS Worcester	Bedford School
Men 2x	Claires Court School / Windsor Boys' School	Leander	Marlow / Pangbourne College
Men 4-	Bedford School A	Bedford School B	Lea
Men 4x	Windsor Boys' School	Peterborough City / Poplar / Star Club / Warrington	St Neots
Men 4+	Bedford School	Bedford Modern School	George Heriot's School
Men J16 1x	Queen Elizabeth HS	Gloucester	Wycliffe College
Men J16 2-	Nithsdale	Kingston Grammar School	Hampton School
Men J16 2x	St George's College	Tiffin	Henley
Men J16 4-	Eton College	St Edward's	N/A
Men J16 4+	St Edward's	Eton College	Kingston Grammar School
Men J16 4x	Cambois	Henley	Evesham / RGS Worcester
Men J16 8	Eton College	Kingston Grammar School	N/A
Men J15 1x	Norwich	Burway	Durham
Men J15 2x	Henley	Bedford School	Queen Elizabeth HS
Men J15 4x+	Windsor Boys' School	Tiffin	Hampton School
Men J14 1x	St Edward's School	Maidstone Invicta	Sudbury
Men J14 2x	St Leonard's School	Henley	Stourport
Men J14 4x+	Windsor Boys' School	Stourport	Henley
Women 1x	Tideway Scullers School	Christchurch	St Ives
Women 2-	Kingston Grammar School	Bedford High School	N/A
Women 2x	Nithsdale	George Watson's	Wycliffe College
Women 4-	Haberdasher's Monmouth Girls	Aberdeen Schools	King's School Worcester
Women 4x	Wycliffe College	Henley	Sir William Borlase
Women 4+	George Heriot's School	Aberdeen Schools	Kingston Grammar School
Women 8+	King's School Worcester	Aberdeen Schools / George Heriot's School	Gloucester
Women J16 1x	George Watson's	Royal Chester	Monkton Bluefriars
Women J16 2x	Henley	Kingston Grammar School	Loughborough
Women J16 4+	Lady Eleanor Holles School	Haberdasher's Monmouth Girls	George Heriot's School
Women J16 4x	Henley	Bradford on Avon / Hereford Cathedral School / Wycliffe College	Queen Elizabeth HS
Women J16 8	Haberdasher's Monmouth Girls	George Heriot's School	N/A
Women J15 1x	Queens Park HS	Headington School	Bedford High School
Women J15 2x	Headington School	Wycliffe College	Star Club
Women J15 4x+	Gloucester	Henley	Northwich
Women J14 1x	Cambois	Northwich	Queens Park HS
Women J14 2x	Headington School	Queens Park HS	Stourport
Women J14 4x+	Headington School	Northwich	St Leonard's School

Key

Symbol	meaning
1, 2, 4, 8	crew size
+	coxed
-	coxless
x	sculls
14	Under-14
15	Under-15
16	Under-16
J	Junior
