= 2000 British Rowing Championships =

- Venue: National Water Sports Centre
- Location: Holme Pierrepont (Nottingham)
- Dates: 14–16 July 2000

The 2000 British Rowing Championships known as the National Championships at the time, were the 29th edition of the National Championships, held from 14–16 July 2000 at the National Water Sports Centre in Holme Pierrepont, Nottingham. They were organised and sanctioned by British Rowing, and are open to British rowers.

== Senior ==
=== Medal summary ===
Event	Gold	Silver	Bronze
Men 1x	Leander C	Rob Roy	Leander B Richard Briscoe
Men 2-	London/Tideway Scullers School	Molesey	Bedford / Abingdon
Men 2+	London	Nautilus	Holme Pierrepont
Men 2x	Leander	Nautilus	Castle Semple
Men 4-	Molesey	Worcester	Queen's Tower
Men 4x	Tideway Scullers School	Henley / Leander / Windsor Boys' School / Tiffin	Thames
Men 4+	London	Nautilus	Lea
Men 8+	Leander / NCRA /Tideway Scullers School / Worcester	Oxford Brookes University	Nautilus
Women 1x	Tideway Scullers School; Debbie Flood	Clydesdale; Alison Watt	Wallingford
Women 2x	NCRA / Star Club	Upper Thames	Walbrook / Grosvenor
Women 2-	Kingston / Newcastle University	Worcester	Upper Thames
Women 4x	Molesey	Hereford / Maidenhead	Loughborough
Women 4-	London University / Tyrian	Lady Eleanor Holles School / Oundle School / Bedford School / Haberdasher's Monmouth Girls	Aberdeen Schools / Clyde
Women 4+	Nautilus	Thames	Wallingford
Women 8+	Upper Thames / Kingston / Thames	Thames	Nautilus

== Lightweight ==
=== Medal summary ===
Event	Gold	Silver	Bronze
Men L1x	Leander	Tideway Scullers School	Queen's Tower
Men L2x	Leander	Bacon / Thames Tradesmen	Auriol Kensington
Men L2-	Leander	Northampton / Bradford-on-Avon	Nottingham
Men L4-	Holme Pierrepont	Oxford Brookes University	London
Men L4x	Holme Pierrepont	Tideway Scullers School	Walton
Women L1x	Wallingford	Imperial College	Upper Thames
Women L2x	Mortlake Anglian & Alpha	NCRA	Stratford-upon-Avon
Women L2-	Tideway Scullers School	Marlow	Avon County
Women L4x	Thames	NCRA / Mortlake Anglian & Alpha	N/A
Women L4-	Avon County	Nottingham B	Nottingham A

== U 23 ==
=== Medal summary ===
Event	Gold	Silver	Bronze
Men 1x	Nottingham University C	Nottingham University B	Glasgow

== Coastal ==
=== Medal summary ===
Event	Gold	Silver	Bronze
Men 1x	Southsea A	Southsea B	Ryde
Men 2-	Southsea B	Christchurch	Southsea A
Men 4+	Itchen Imperial	Poole	Ryde

== Junior ==
=== Medal summary ===
Event	Gold	Silver	Bronze
Men 1x	Leander	George Watson's	Marlow
Men 2-	Eton College	Bedford Modern School	Hampton School
Men 2x	Bryanston School	Dulwich College	Marlow
Men 4-	Nithsdale	Hampton School	Bedford School
Men 4x	Wycliffe College	Reading	Dulwich College / King's College School
Men 4+	Abingdon School / St Edward's / St Paul's School / Bedford School	Aberdeen Schools	Bedford Modern School
Men J16 1x	Leander	St Edward's	Durham
Men J16 2-	Westminster School	Hampton School	Eton College
Men J16 2x	Peterborough City	Burton Leander	Dulwich College
Men J16 4-	Abingdon School	Hampton School	Eton College
Men J16 4+	Abingdon School	King's School Worcester	Windsor Boys' School
Men J16 4x	Molesey	Windsor Boys' School	Peterborough City
Men J15 1x	Tideway Scullers School	George Watson's	Durham
Men J15 2x	Henley	Peterborough City	Windsor Boys' School
Men J15 4x+	RGS Worcester	Windsor Boys' School	Winchester College
Men J14 1x	Hereford	St Edward's School	Marlow
Men J14 2x	St Leonard's School	Dulwich College	Evesham
Men J14 4x+	Windsor Boys' School	St Neots / Star Club / Sudbury	Dulwich College A
Women 1x	Queen Elizabeth HS	Star Club	Wycliffe Sculling Centre
Women 2-	Gloucester	Oundle School	St Paul's Girls' School
Women 2x	Peterborough City	Evesham / Stratford-upon-Avon	Wycliffe Sculling Centre
Women 4-	Haberdasher's Monmouth Girls	Henley	Bedford High School
Women 4x	Henley	Wycliffe Sculling Centre	Northwich
Women 4+	Haberdasher's Monmouth Girls	Aberdeen Schools	Oundle School
Women 8+	Gloucester	Haberdasher's Monmouth Girls	Kingston Grammar School / Headington School / Bfrd / Lady Eleanor Holles School
Women J16 1x	Queen's Park HS	Stratford-upon-Avon	Cambois
Women J16 2x	Evesham / Stratford-upon-Avon	St Leonard's School	Star Club
Women J16 4+	Bedford High School	Burton Leander	Haberdasher's Monmouth Girls
Women J16 4x	Henley	Dame Alice Harpur	George Watson's
Women J15 1x	St Neots	Queen Elizabeth HS	Headington School
Women J15 2x	Durham	Henley	Northwich
Women J15 4x+	Northwich	Henley	St Leonard's School
Women J14 1x	Lady Eleanor Holles School	Hereford	Poole
Women J14 2x	Headington School A	Headington School C	Headington School B
Women J14 4x+	Headington School	Lady Eleanor Holles School	Henley

Key

Symbol	meaning
1, 2, 4, 8	crew size
+	coxed
-	coxless
x	sculls
14	Under-14
15	Under-15
16	Under-16
J	Junior
