= Monmouth School for Girls Rowing Club =

British rowing club

Haberdashers' Monmouth School for Girls Rowing Club
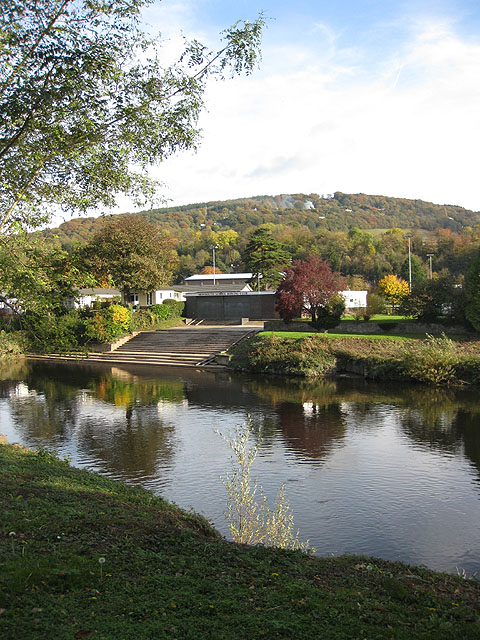

- Location: Old Dixton Road, Monmouth, Monmouthshire, Wales
- Coordinates: 51.813267°N 2.708119°W
- Affiliations: British Rowing (boat code HAB)
- Website: www.habsmonmouth.org/girls/co-curricular/sport/

Haberdashers' Monmouth School for Girls Rowing Club is a rowing club on the western bank of River Wye, based at The Boathouse, Old Dixton Road, Monmouth, Monmouthshire, Wales.

== History ==
The club was founded in 1990 and belongs to the Haberdashers' Monmouth School for Girls.

Currently, the Monmouth Rowing Club boathouse hosts the boats and equipment from Haberdashers' Monmouth School for Girls Rowing Club and Monmouth Comprehensive School Boat Club (founded 1992).

The club has produced multiple British champions

== Honours ==
=== British champions ===
| Year | Winning crew/s |
|---|---|
| 1993 | J18 8+ |
| 1995 | J18 8+, J16 4+ |
| 1996 | J18 8+ |
| 1998 | J18 4-, J16 8 |
| 1999 | J16 4+ |
| 2000 | J18 4-, J18 4+ |
| 2001 | J18 4-, J18 4+ |
| 2002 | J16 4+ |
| 2004 | J18 4+ |
| 2009 | J18 8+ |
