= The King's School Rowing Club =

British rowing club

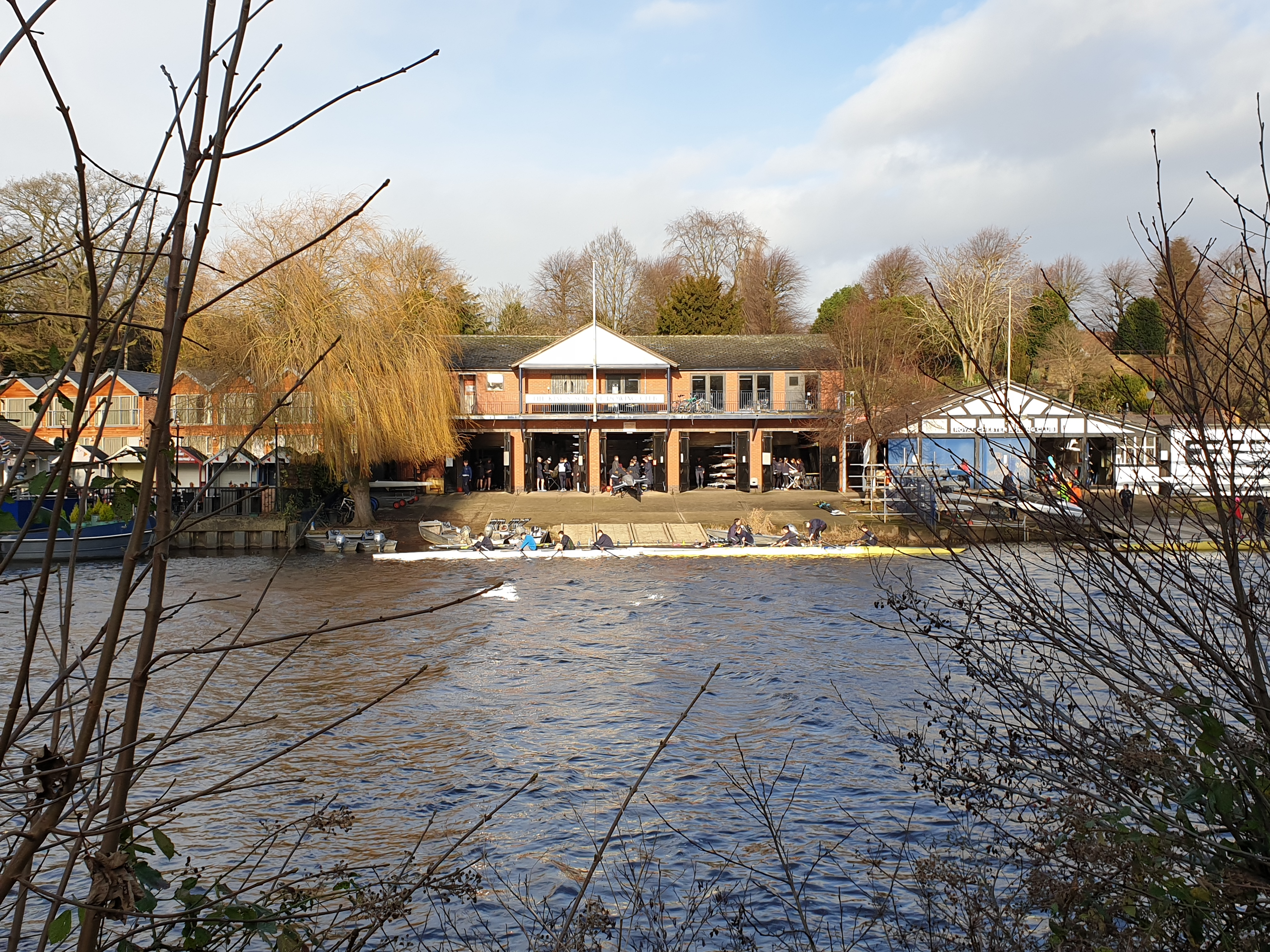

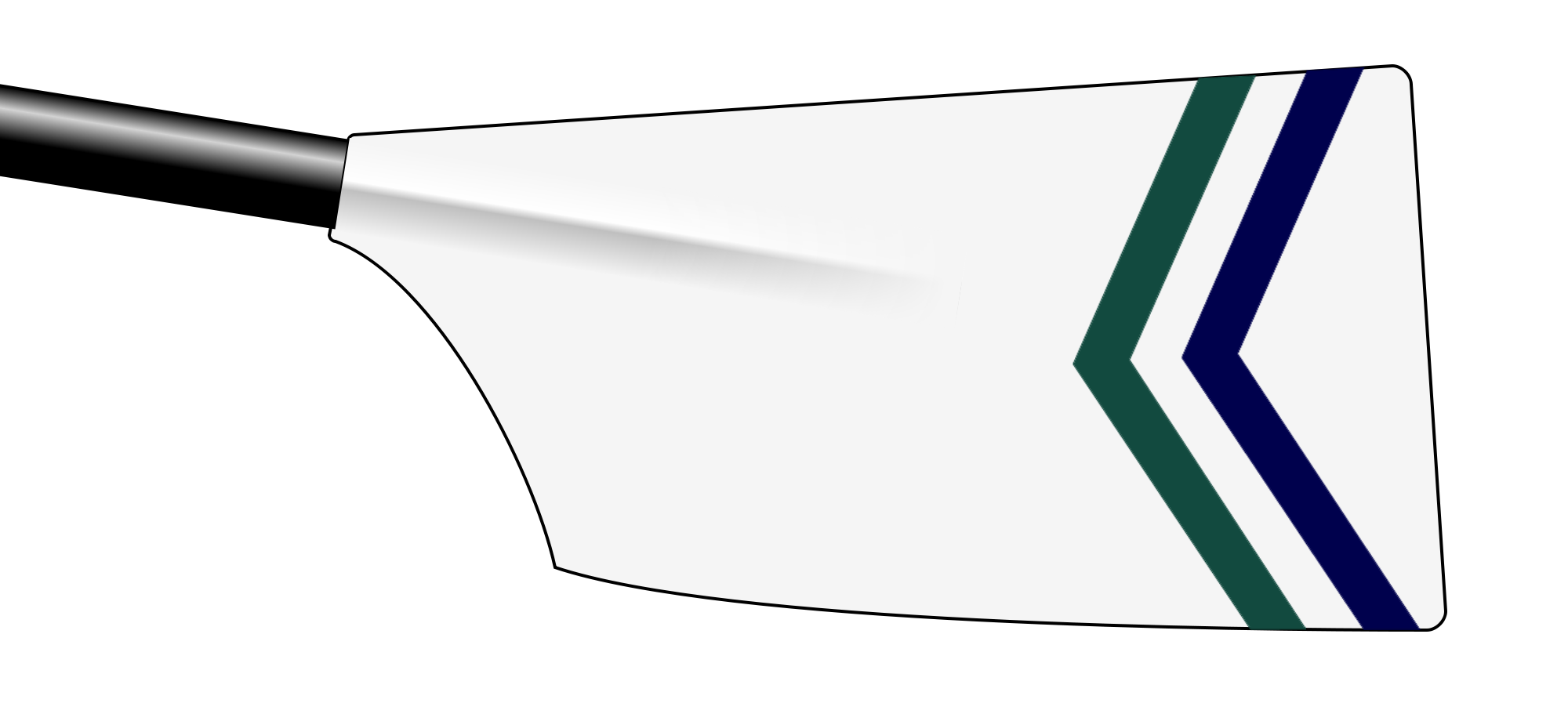
- Location: The Groves, Chester, Cheshire, England
- Coordinates: 53.189121°N 2.881159°W
- Home water: River Dee Chester, Cheshire
- Founded: 1883
- Affiliations: British Rowing (boat code KCH)
- Website: www.kingschester.co.uk/clubs-activities/rowing/

The King's School Rowing Club is a rowing club on the River Dee, based at The Groves, Chester, Cheshire, England. The boathouse is adjacent (on the west side) of the Royal Chester Rowing Club.

== History ==
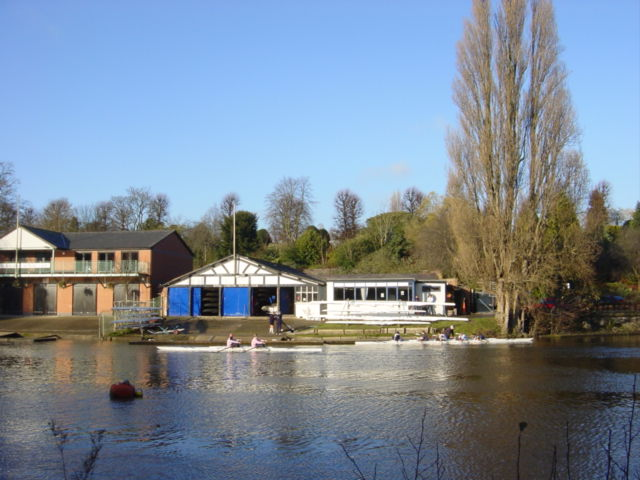
School boathouse (left) next to Royal Chester RC (right), 2005

File:Rowing Club on River Dee - geograph.org.uk - 96977.jpg

The club belongs to The King's School, Chester and was founded in 1883.

The club won the prestigious Visitors' Challenge Cup at the Henley Regatta in 1993 and has produced multiple British champions. The 1st VIII also made it to the Princess Elizabeth Challenge Cup quarter-final in 1993, 1994, 1995, 1996, 2009 & 2022, the semi-final in 1992, and the final in 2006.

== Honours ==
=== Henley Royal Regatta ===
Year	Winning crew
1993	Visitors' Challenge Cup

=== British champions ===
Year	Winning crew/s
1974	Men J16 4-
1976	Men J18 2+
1988	Men J14 4x
1989	Men J14 4x
1990	Men J16 4-
1991	Men J18 4x, Men J16 4x, Men J14 2x
1993	Men J18 2+
1994	Men J16 4+, Men J16 4-
1995	Men J18 8+
2002	Men J18 4x, Men J16 4x
2004	Open J18 4x
2005	Open J16 4+
