= Bedford School Boat Club =

Rowing club in Bedfordshire, England

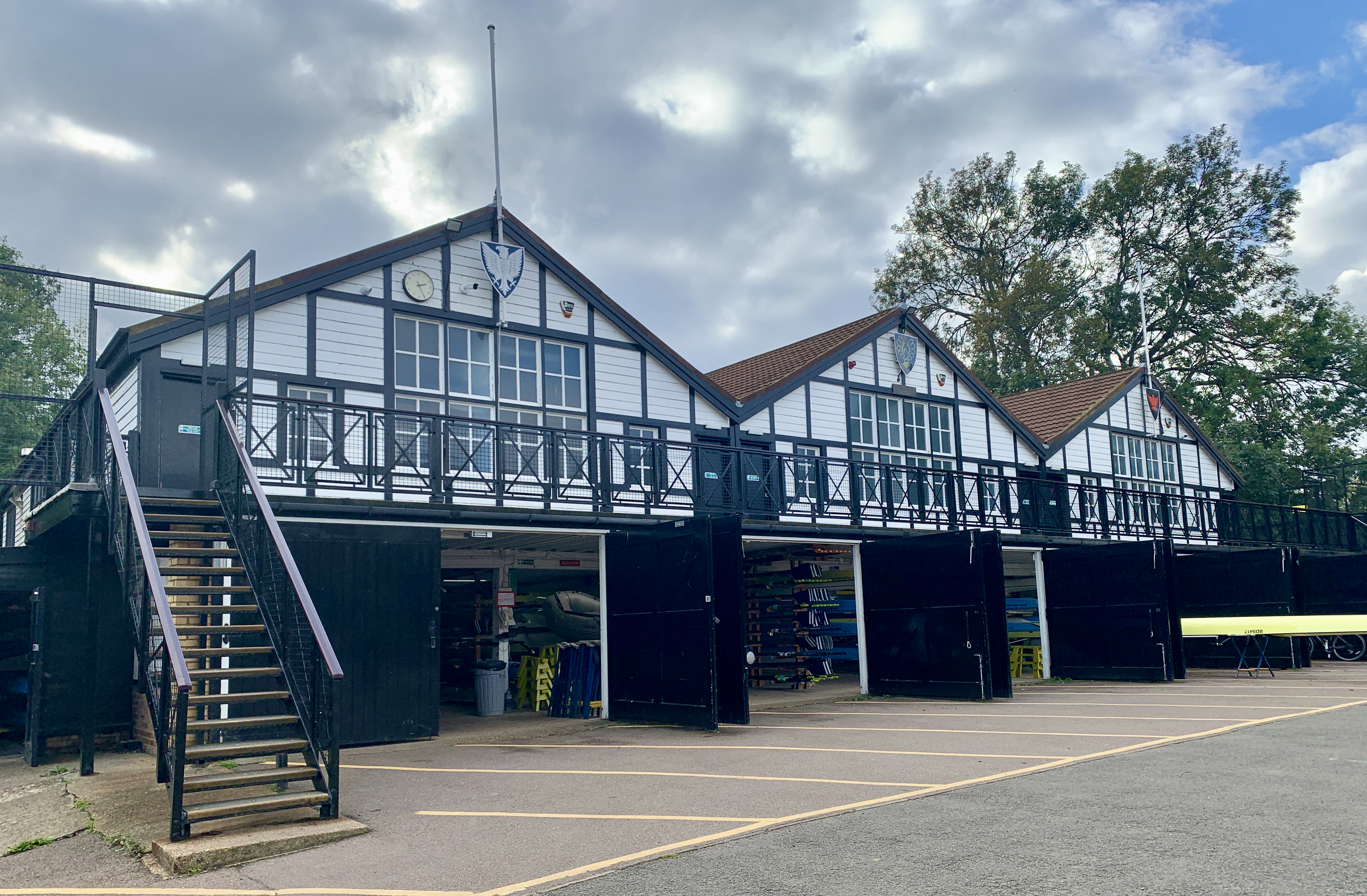

- Bedford School's boathouse is on the left
- Location: Longholme Boathouse, The Embankment by Butterfly Bridge, Bedford, Bedfordshire, England
- Coordinates: 52.133170°N 0.453998°W
- Founded: 1861
- Affiliations: British Rowing boat code - BDS
- Website: www.bedfordschool.org.uk/upper-school/sport/rowing/

Bedford School Boat Club (BSBC) is a rowing club based on the River Great Ouse at Longholme Boathouse, The Embankment by Butterfly Bridge, Bedford, Bedfordshire, England.

== History ==
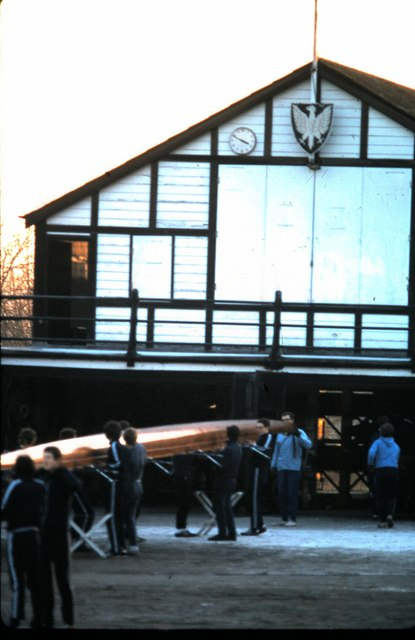
The boathouse in 1978

The boat club was founded in 1861 making it the sixth oldest school boat club in England. It is owned by Bedford School with rowing being a major school sport. The boathouse is a three sectioned shared building with Bedford Modern School Boat Club and Bedford Girls' School Rowing Club.

The club has won the prestigious Princess Elizabeth Challenge Cup at the Henley Royal Regatta on four occasions and has also won the non championship eights (formerly Child Beale Trophy) at the National Schools' Regatta in 2018.

On 4 May 2022, the boathouse celebrated its 100th anniversary.

== Honours ==
=== Henley Royal Regatta ===
Year	Winning crew
1880	Public Schools Challenge Cup
1881	Public Schools Challenge Cup
1946	Princess Elizabeth Challenge Cup
1947	Princess Elizabeth Challenge Cup
1948	Princess Elizabeth Challenge Cup
1951	Princess Elizabeth Challenge Cup
1978	Special Race for Schools

=== National Schools' Regatta ===
Year	Winning crew
2018	Non championship eights

=== British champions ===
Year	Winning crew/s
1987	Men J18 8+
1991	Men J18 2-
1994	Men J16 8+
1995	Men J18 4-, Men J16 4+
1996	Men J18 8+
1997	Men J18 8, Men J16 4+
1998	Men J18 4-, Men J18 4+
1999	Men J16 4-
2000	Men J18 4+
2002	Men J18 4-
2004	Open J18 4-
2005	Open J18 4-,
