= Headington School Oxford Boat Club =

British rowing club

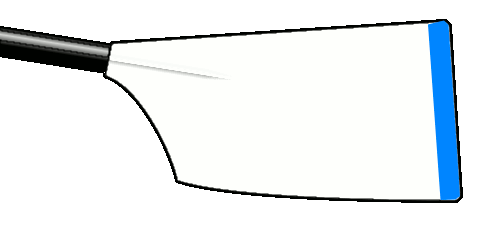
- Location: St Edwards School Boathouse, Godstow Road, Oxford, Oxfordshire
- Coordinates: 51.779729°N 1.297374°W
- Founded: 1991
- Affiliations: British Rowing boat code - HED
- Website: www.hsobc.co.uk

Headington School Oxford Boat Club (HSOBC for short) is a rowing club on the River Thames currently based in rented premises at St Edwards School Boathouse on Godstow Road, Oxford, Oxfordshire. It is the rowing club belonging to Headington School.

== History ==
The club was founded in 1991. In June 2019 the club was given planning permission to build their own boat house on a new site called Maddy Moorings, on the High Street near Long Wittenham at coordinates 51.645468°N 1.210125°W.

== Honours ==
=== National champions ===
Year	Winning crew
1997	W2-
1998	W4x composite, WJ15 2x, WJ14 2x, WJ14 4x+
1999	WJ16 1x, WJ16 2x, WJ15 2x, WJ14 2x, WJ14 4x+
2000	WJ14 2x, WJ14 4x+
2001	WJ8+, WJ16 4x
2002	WJ14 4x+
2007	WJ2-
2009	W2-, Women 8+
2021	WJ18 8+

Key

- W women, +coxed, -coxless, x sculls, J junior, 18 16, 15, 14 age group

=== National Schools' Regatta ===
Year	Winning crew
2009	The Aylings Challenge Cup
2010	The Aylings Challenge Cup
2011	The Aylings Challenge Cup
2012	The Aylings Challenge Cup
2013	The Aylings Challenge Cup
2014	The Aylings Challenge Cup
2015	The Aylings Challenge Cup
2016	The Aylings Challenge Cup
2017	The Aylings Challenge Cup

=== Henley Royal Regatta ===
Year	Races won
2021	Junior Women's Eights
2024	Prince Philip Challenge Trophy
2025	Prince Philip Challenge Trophy

== See also ==
- Rowing on the River Thames
