= Wycliffe College Boat Club =

British rowing club

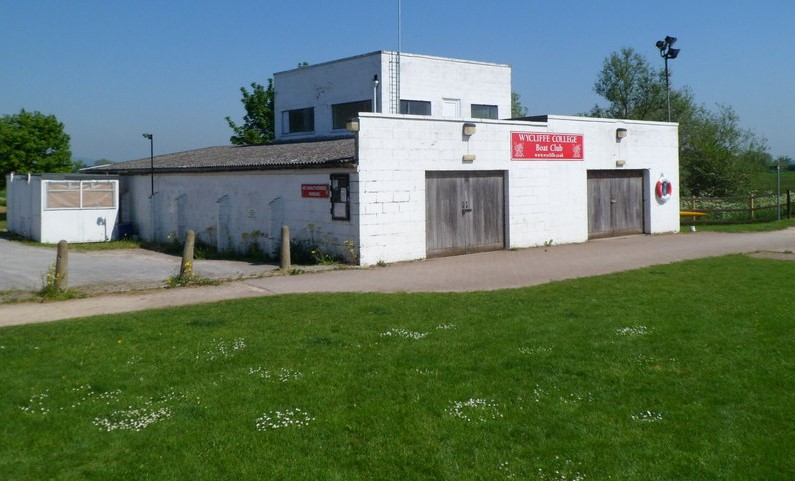

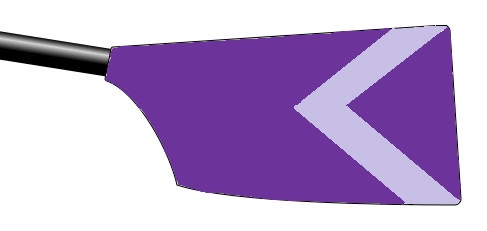
- Location: Wycliffe College boathouse, Junction Bridge, Saul, Gloucestershire
- Coordinates: 51.782258°N 2.354671°W
- Affiliations: British Rowing (boat code WYC)
- Website: www.wycliffe.co.uk/senior-school/

Wycliffe College Boat Club is a rowing club on the Gloucester and Sharpness Canal, based at Wycliffe College boathouse, Junction Bridge, Saul, Gloucestershire.

== History ==
The club belongs to the Wycliffe College, Gloucestershire and shares the boathouse with the University of the West of England Boat Club.

The club has produced multiple national champions.

== Honours ==
Henley Royal Regatta
Year	Event
2024	Diamond Jubilee Challenge Cup
2025	Diamond Jubilee Challenge Cup

Henley Women's Regatta
Year	Event
2023	The Bea Langridge Trophy
2024	The Bea Langridge Trophy
2024	The Di Ellis Trophy
2025	The Bea Langridge Trophy
2026	The Di Ellis Trophy

National Schools Regatta
Year	Event
2022	2nd 4x Girls'
2023	Ch 4x Girls'
2023	2nd 4x Girls'
2023	J16 2x Girls'
2024	Ch 4x Girls'
2024	2nd 4x Girls'
2025	2nd 4x Girls'

Schools' Head of the River
Year	Event	Time
2023	Girls' Championship Eights	18:45.8
2024	Girls' Championship Quads	18:15.4

=== National champions ===
Year	Winning crew/s
1988	Men J16 2x
1989	Men J16 2x
1997	Men J16 4x
1998	Women J18 4x
1999	Women J18 1x
2000	Men J18 4x
2001	Women J16 1x
2002	Women J15 2x
2003	Women 4x
2021	WJ16 1x
