= Queen Elizabeth High School Rowing Club =

British rowing club

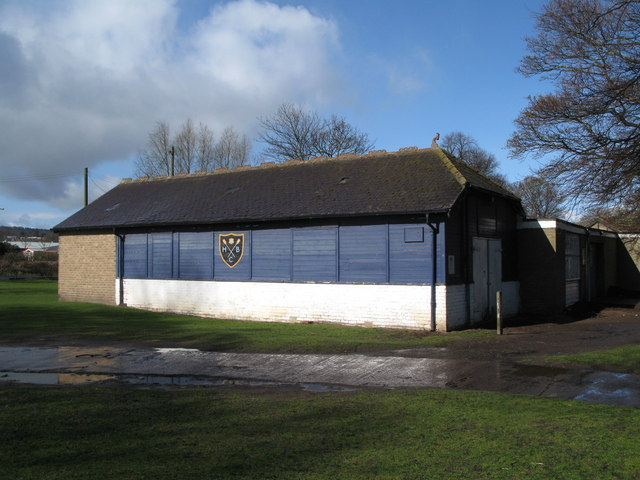

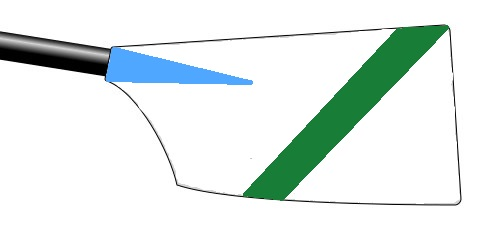
- Location: Tyne Green boathouse, Nr Hexham Bridge, Hexham, Northumberland, England
- Coordinates: 54.976094°N 2.095789°W
- Affiliations: British Rowing (boat code QEH)
- Website: www.qehs.net/index.php/2019/09/09/learn-to-row/

Queen Elizabeth High School Rowing Club is a rowing club on the River Tyne, based at Tyne Green boathouse, Nr Hexham Bridge, Hexham, Northumberland, England.

== History ==
The club belongs to Queen Elizabeth High School, Hexham. The boathouse used by the school at Tyne Green is shared with Hexham Rowing Club.

== Honours ==
=== British champions ===
Year	Winning crew/s
1983	Women J18 4+
1984	Women J18 4+
1986	Women J16 4x+
1988	Women J16 4x+
1991	Women J14 4x
1992	Women J18 2x, Women J14 2x
1993	Men J18 1x, Women J16 2x, Women J15 2x, Women J14 4x
1994	Women J18 2x
1996	Women J18 1x, Men J16 4-
1997	Men J15 1x
1998	Men J16 1x
2000	Women J18 1x
2001	Women J15 1x
2004	Women J14 2x
2009	Women J16 2x
2013	Women J16 4+
2014	Women J16 4+
2015	Women J18 2-
2018	Open J18 1x
