= Bedford Modern School Boat Club =

Rowing club in Bedfordshire, England

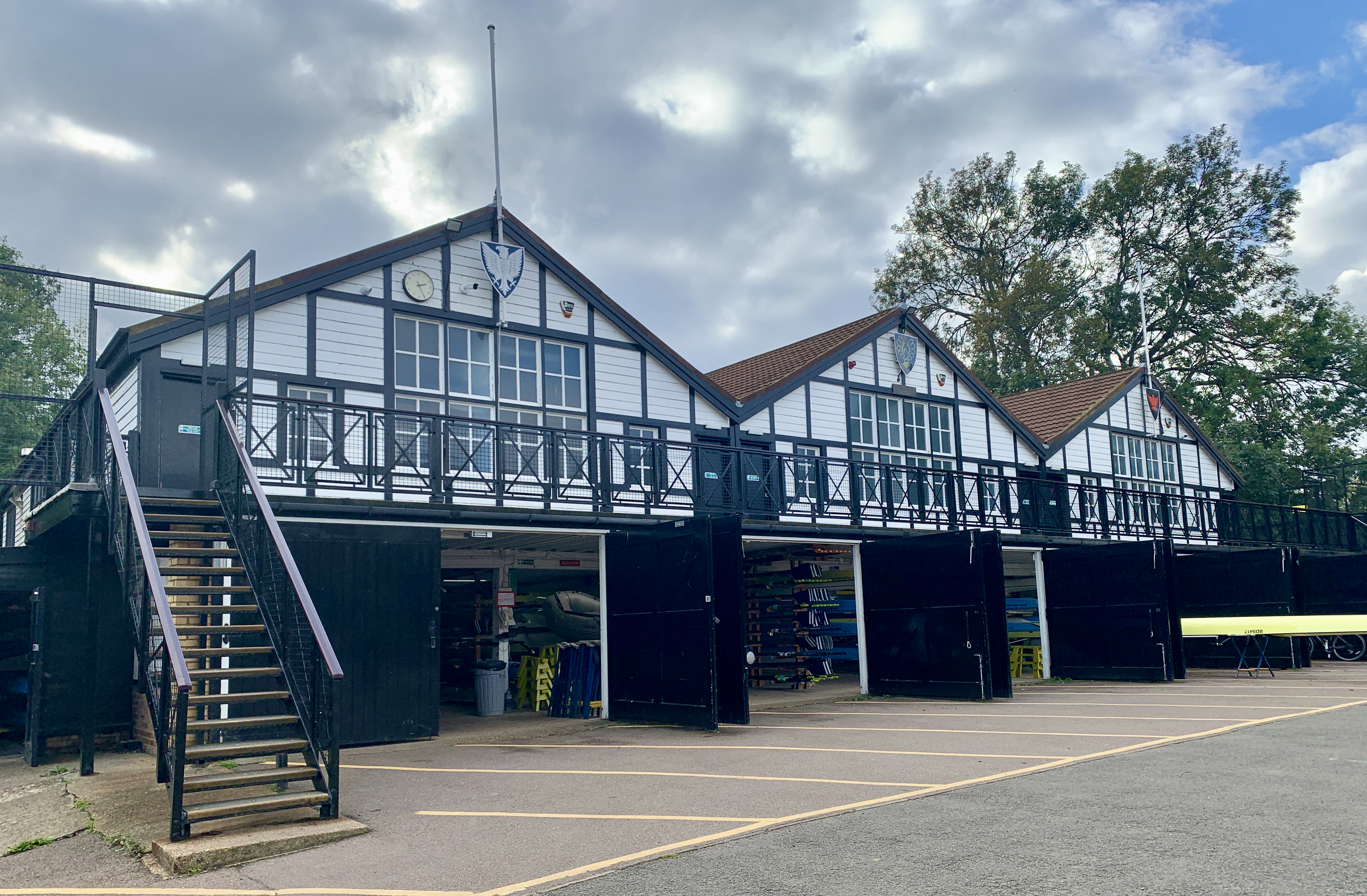

- Bedford Modern School's boathouse is on the far right
- Location: Harpur Trust / Longholme Boathouse, The Embankment by Butterfly Bridge, Bedford, Bedfordshire
- Coordinates: 52.133170°N 0.453998°W
- Affiliations: British Rowing boat code - BMS
- Website: bmsbc.org

Bedford Modern School Boat Club is a rowing club based on the River Great Ouse at the Harpur Trust / Longholme Boathouse, The Embankment by Butterfly Bridge, Bedford, Bedfordshire

== History ==
The boat club is owned by Bedford Modern School with rowing being a major school sport, currently under the control of Mark Bavington. The club participates in the Henley Royal Regatta, Henley Women's Regatta, Schools' Head of the River Race, and National Schools' Regatta. The boathouse is a three sectioned shared building with Bedford School Boat Club and Bedford Girls' School Rowing Club.

On 4 May 2022, the boathouse celebrated its 100th anniversary.

The club has produced multiple British champions.

== Honours ==
=== British champions ===
Year	Winning crew/s
1977	Men J18 2-, Men J18 2+
1988	Men J18 2+, Men J18 4-, Men J18 8+
1992	Men J18 4-
1995	Men J18 2-
1997	Men J16 2-
1998	Men J18 2-
2004	Open J16 4+
2005	Open J18 4+
2010	Women U23 2x

=== National Schools' Regatta ===
Year	Winning crew
2009	Eight - Child Beale Cup
