= King's School Worcester Boat Club =

British rowing club

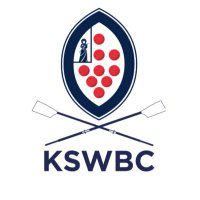

- Location: Michael Baker Boathouse, Severn Street, Worcester, Worcestershire
- Coordinates: 52.186649°N 2.222161°W
- Founded: 1877
- Affiliations: British Rowing (boat code KSW)
- Website: en-gb.facebook.com/pg/KSWBoatClub/about

King's School Worcester Boat Club is a rowing club on the River Severn, based at the Michael Baker Boathouse, Severn Street, Worcester, Worcestershire.

== History ==
The club was founded in 1877 and belongs to the King's School, Worcester.

A new boathouse was built in 2012 following a donation of £2.5 million by former pupil Michael Baker.

The club has produced multiple British champions.

== Honours ==
=== British champions ===
Year	Winning crew/s
1975	Men J16 1x
1990	Men J16 4+
1992	Women J18 8+
1996	Women J15 4x
1998	Women J18 8+
2002	Women J18 8+
2003	Men J16 4x, Men J15 4x+, Women J18 4+
2004	Women J18 8+
2005	Women J16 1x
2021	WJ18 2-

=== Henley Royal Regatta ===
Year	Winning crew
2003	Fawley Challenge Cup
