= Cambois Rowing Club =

British rowing club

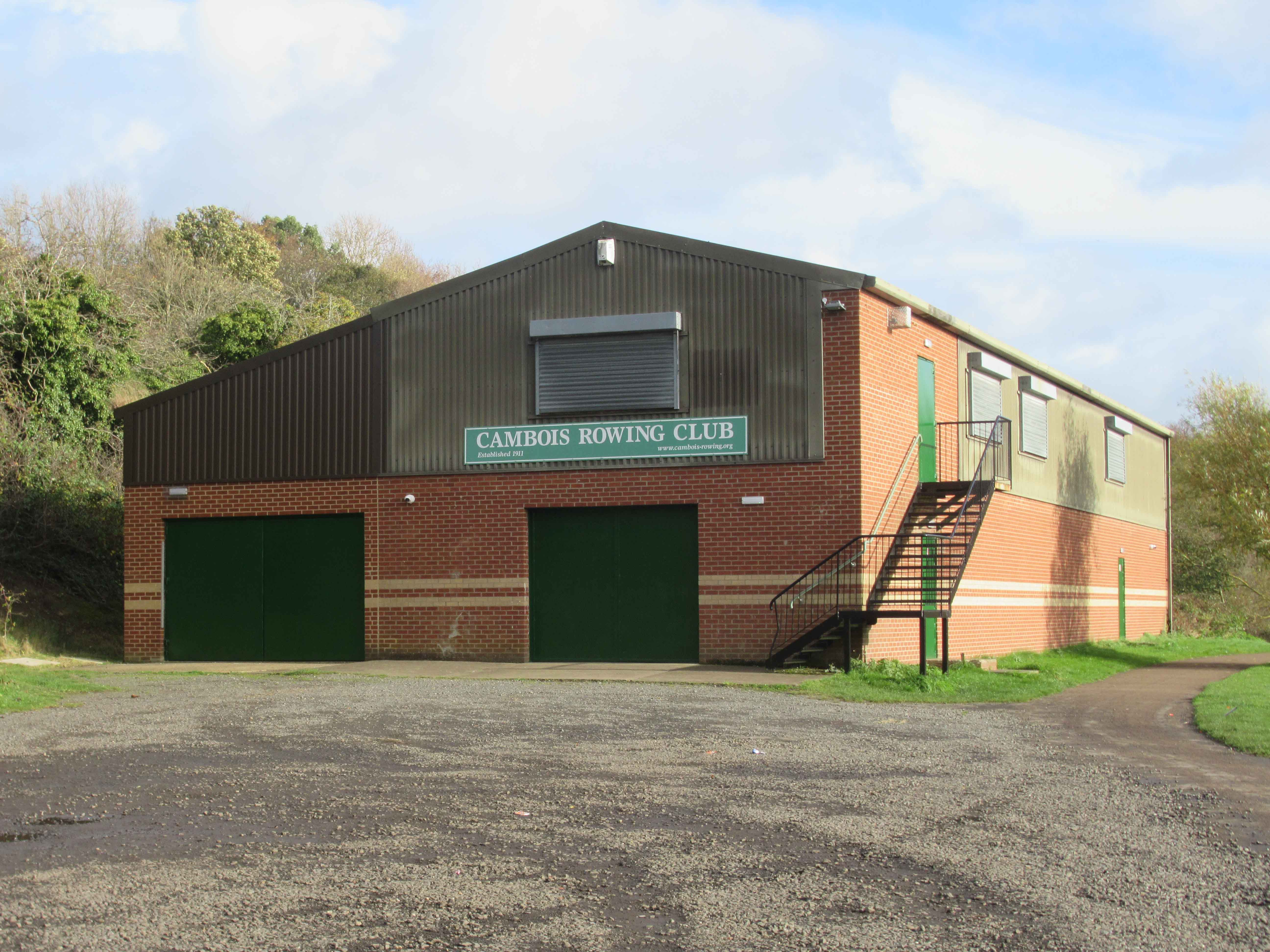

- Location: Blackclose Bank, Riverside Park, Ashington, Northumberland, England
- Coordinates: 55.166774°N 1.569524°W
- Founded: 1911
- Affiliations: British Rowing (boat code CBS)
- Website: www.cambois-rowing.org/home.aspx

Cambois Rowing Club is a rowing club on the River Wansbeck, based at Blackclose Bank, Riverside Park, Ashington, Northumberland, England and is affiliated to British Rowing. The blade colours are green with a white fly (also called outboard) triangle; kit: green.

== History ==
The club was founded in 1911 on the River Blyth. In 1932, the club moved headquarters to the north end of Blyth High Dock.

It was not until 1977 that the club moved to the current location.

The club has produced multiple British champions.

== Honours ==
=== British champions ===
Year	Winning crew/s
1993	Women J18 2x
1994	Women J16 4+
1997	Men J15 4x+, Women J14 1x
1998	Men J16 4x, Women J14 1x
2011	Women J17 1x
2024	Women J14 1x
