= Stratford-upon-Avon Boat Club =

British rowing club

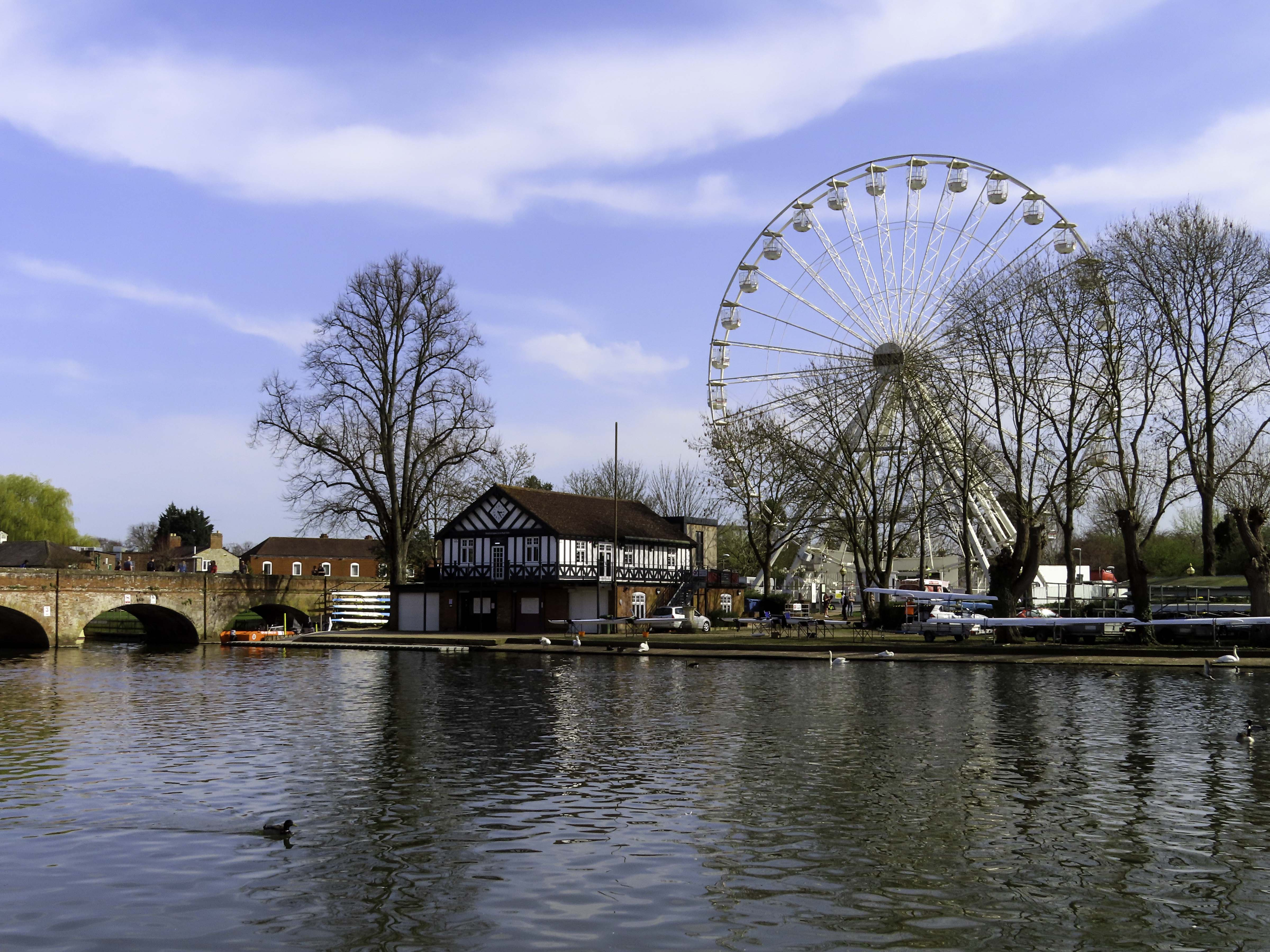

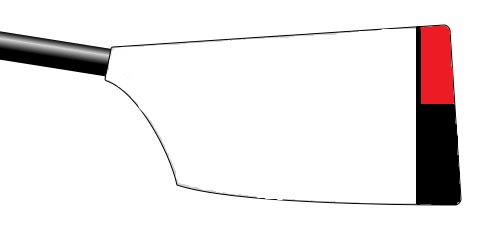
- Location: The Clubhouse, Recreation Ground, Swan's Nest Lane, Stratford-upon-Avon, Warwickshire, England
- Coordinates: 52.190699°N 1.701565°W
- Founded: 1874
- Affiliations: British Rowing (boat code SUA)
- Website: www.stratford-rowing.co.uk

Stratford-upon-Avon Boat Club is a rowing club on the River Avon, based at The Clubhouse, Recreation Ground, Swan's Nest Lane, Stratford-upon-Avon, Warwickshire, England and is affiliated to British Rowing.

== History ==
The club was founded on Monday 10 August 1874. The Annual General meeting originally took place at the Falcon Hotel.

The club has intermittently produced British champions since 1977.

== Club colours ==
The blade colours are: blades: white with crimson & black squares; kit: crimson & black.

== Honours ==
=== British champions ===
Year	Winning crew/s
1977	Women 4x composite
1990	Women J16 2- composite
2000	Women J16 2x composite
2009	Open J14 2x, Women J18 4- composite
2010	Open J15 2x
