= Stourport Boat Club =

British rowing club

- Emblem: Comitatus Wigorniensis: for dark blue roundel for a riverside pear tree between hills; outlying: initials, Est. 1876 and four tips of old square (standard) wooden oars
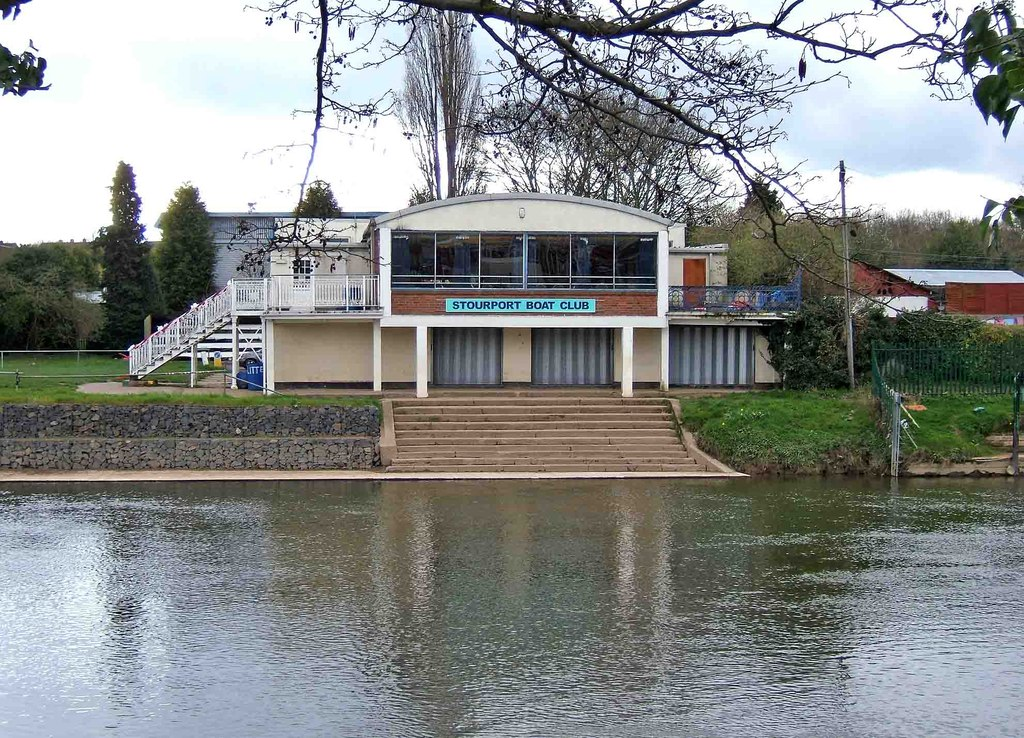

- Location: Riverside, Dunley Road, Stourport-on-Severn, Worcestershire, England
- Coordinates: 52.3364°N 2.2826°W
- Home water: River Severn
- Founded: 1876
- Affiliations: British Rowing (boat code STP)
- Website: stourportbc.co.uk

Events
- Stourport Town Regatta (August: across a weekend)

Stourport Boat Club is a rowing club on the River Severn, based at the Riverside, Dunley Road, Stourport-on-Severn, Worcestershire, England and is affiliated to British Rowing.

== History ==
The club was founded in 1876 although an earlier club did exist. The main pastime of the club when it was founded was boating which resulted in the name that the club still retains today instead of being known as a rowing club.

The club has produced multiple British champions.

== Honours ==
=== British champions ===
Year	Winning crew/s
1993	Women J14 1x
1995	Women J16 1x
1999	Men L2x*, Men L4x*
2002	Men L2-*
2004	Open J18 2x, Open J16 1x
2005	Women J16 2x, Women J16 4x

- Note: * composite
