= City of Oxford Rowing Club =

British rowing club

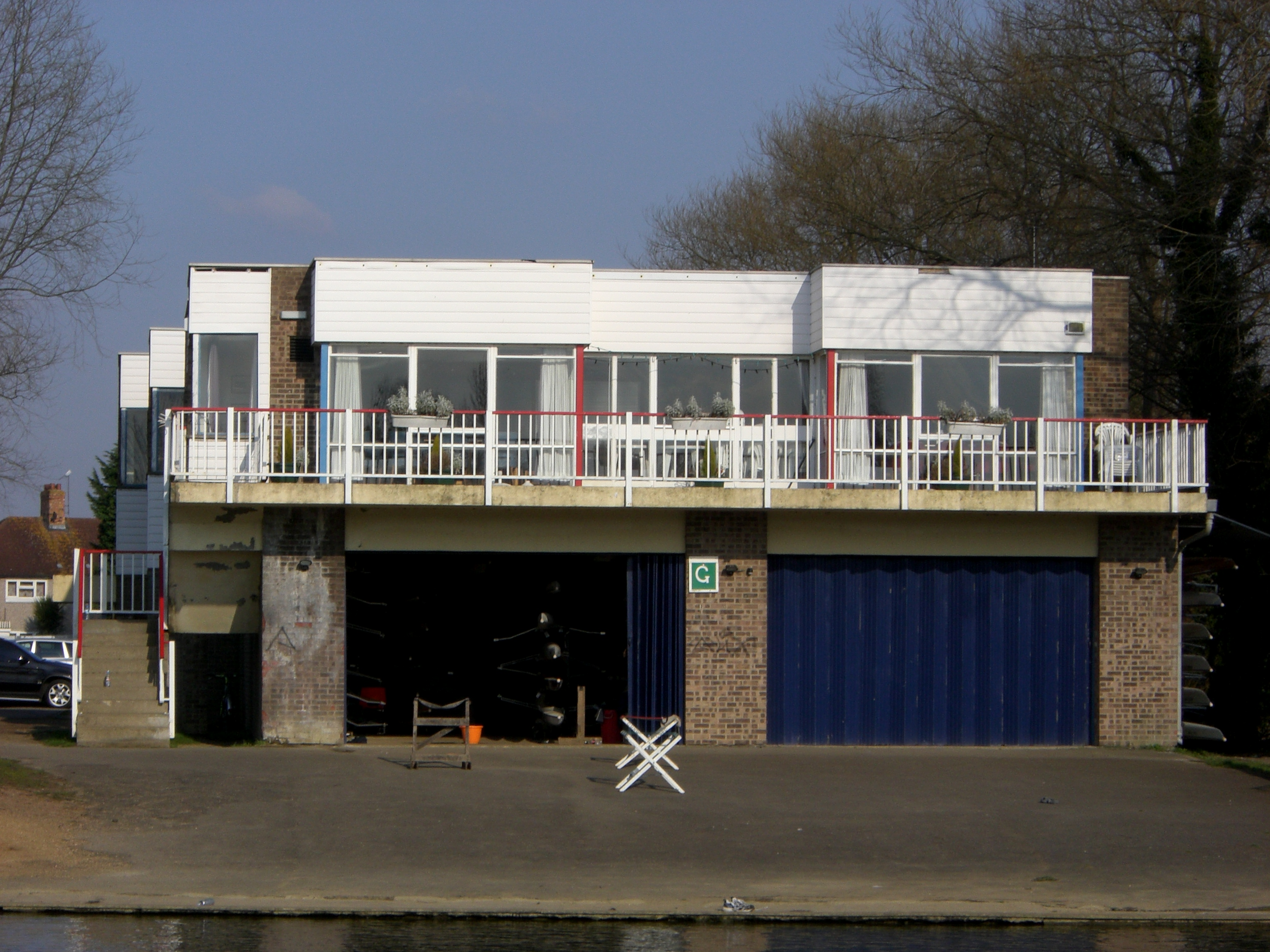

- Location: Oxford, Oxfordshire, England
- Coordinates: 51.735556°N 1.240667°W
- Home water: Thames, The Isis
- Founded: 1968
- Affiliations: British Rowing boat code - COX
- Website: oxfordrowingclub.org.uk

Events
- Oxford City Bumps, Oxford City Royal Regatta, Isis Sculls

City of Oxford Rowing Club is a rowing club on the River Thames based on Meadow Lane, Donnington, Oxford, Oxfordshire.

== History ==
The club was founded in 1968 following the amalgamation of two clubs; Neptune and Hannington.

The club won ten events at the 2002 Oxford City Royal Regatta.

The club have provided nine senior national champion crews since 1988, with the most recent being at the 2025 British Rowing Club Championships.

== Honours ==
=== British champions ===
Year	Winning crew
1988	ML8+
1993	M2+
2004	W4-, WL4-
2007	W4-
2008	WJ18 4-, WJ16 1x, WJ14 2x
2009	W4+
2010	W2-, WJ18 4-, WJ18 4+, OJ15 1x
2011	W2-, W4+
2025	Women Lwt 1x

Key = O open, M men, W women, +coxed, -coxless, x sculls, c composite, L lightweight

== Notable rowers ==
- Christine Aherne (2004 national champion)
- Andrew Baker (cox) (2009 national champion)
- Katy Day (2004 national champion)
- Andrea Dennis (2004 lightweight national champion)
- Mike Edge (1993 national champion)
- Sian Findlay (2011 national champion)
- Adrian Graham (1993 national champion)
- Amy Jackson (2004 national champion)
- Dave Locke (cox)(2011 national champion)
- Jane Loveday (2011 national champion)
- Zoe Lundy (2009 national champion)
- Rachel Luxton (2007 national champion)
- Clare Major (2007, 2009 national champion)
- Anna Reid (2009 national champion)
- Becky Slater (2007 national champion)
- Nicola Smith (2011 national champion)
- Elizabeth Southey (2007 national champion)
- Rachel Urwin (2004 national champion)
- Keren Ward (2009 & 2011 national champion)

== See also ==
- Rowing on the River Thames
