= Runcorn Rowing Club =

British rowing club

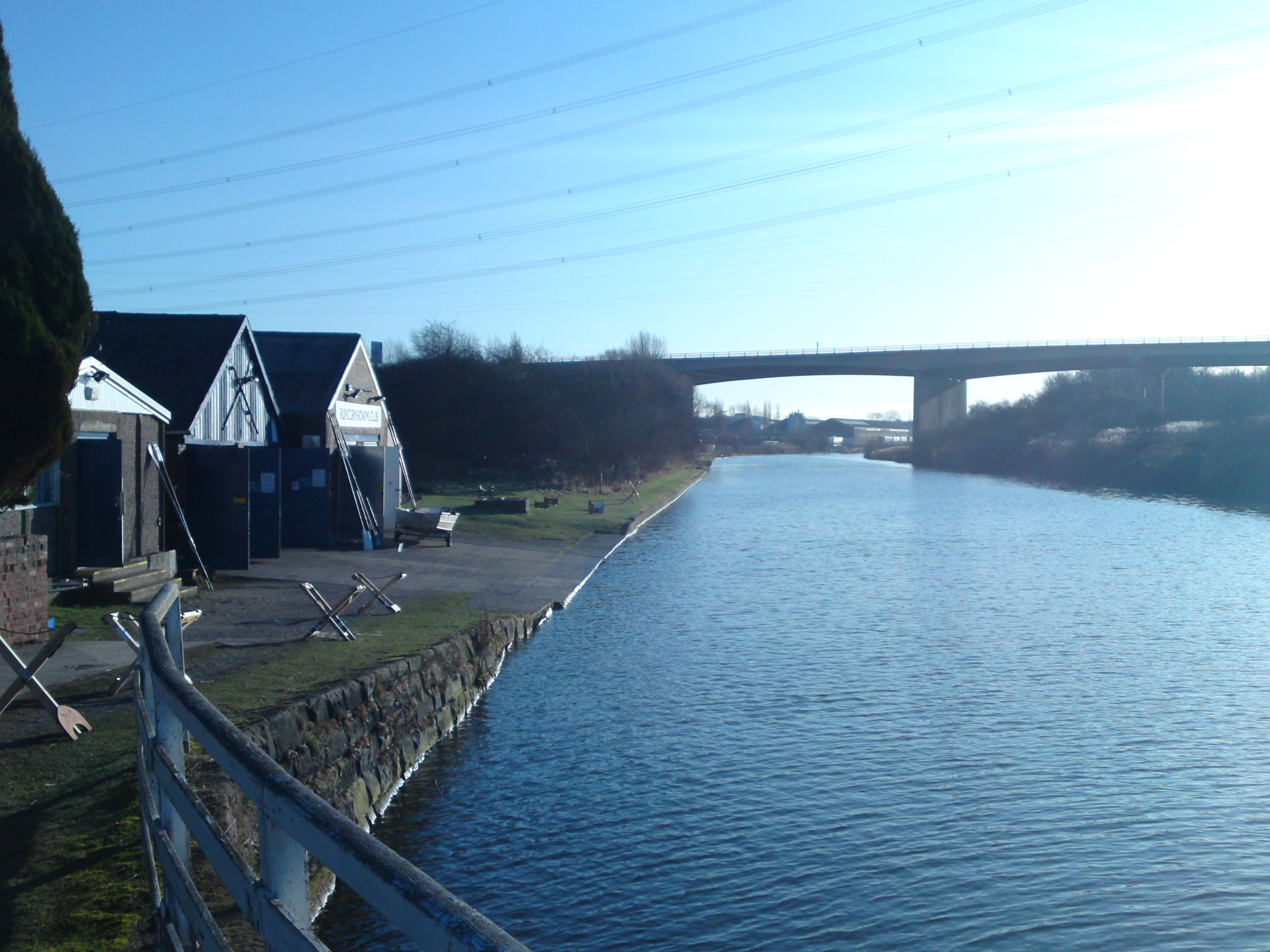

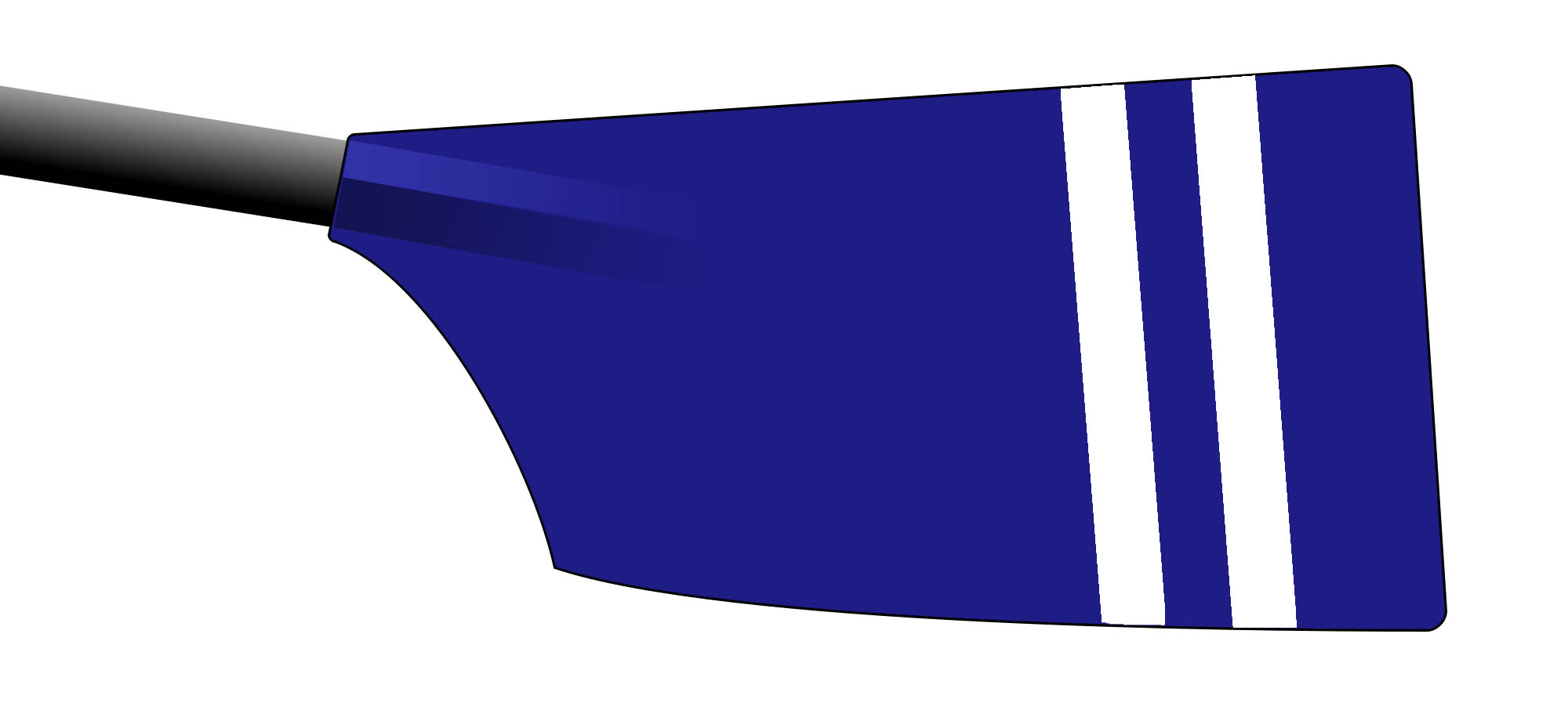
- Motto: Latin: Validus ut Perago, lit. 'strong to the finish'
- Location: Runcorn, Cheshire
- Coordinates: 53.3109°N 2.7121°W
- Home water: River Weaver
- Founded: 1894
- Key people: Ed Burrows (President); Roger Franks (Chairman); George Perrin (Captain)
- Affiliations: British Rowing
- Website: runcornrowing.com
- Acronym: RUN

Events
- Spring Eights Head; Junior Regatta; Autumn Head

Runcorn Rowing Club is a rowing club in Runcorn, Cheshire based on the River Weaver. The club has access to 10km of rowable river from Weston Marsh Lock to Dutton Lock.

== History ==
Runcorn Rowing Club was established in 1894 on land purchased from the Marquis of Cholmondeley. The club received funding in 2005 under British Rowings's 'Project Oarsome' which saw membership increase from 39 to 100 members.

== Club colours ==
The blade colours are royal blue with two white bars; kit: royal blue with white hoops.

== Facilities ==
The club has three boat sheds, the latest opened by Derek Twigg MP in April 2008. A new club house was constructed in 2016 funded by Sport England and assisted by specialists from the consortium working on the Mersey Gateway Bridge.

== Honours ==
=== British champions ===
Year	Winning crew/s
1992	Women 2x
1993	Women L1x
1994	Women L2x
1995	Women L1x
2007	Women J14 1x
2008	Women J15 1x, Women J14 1x
2010	Women 2x, Women L2x, Open J18 4x
2012	Women J18 4x
