= Northwich Rowing Club =

British rowing club

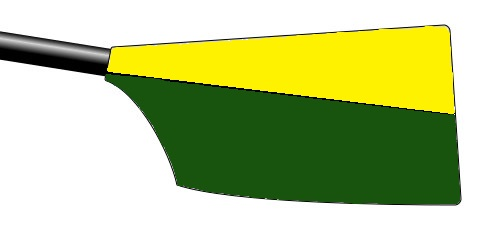
- Location: The Crescent, Riverside, Northwich, Cheshire, England
- Coordinates: 53.251320°N 2.516327°W
- Founded: 1875
- Affiliations: British Rowing (boat code NOW)
- Website: www.northwichrowingclub.com

Northwich Rowing Club is a rowing club on the River Weaver, based at the Crescent, Riverside, Northwich, Cheshire, England.

== History ==
The club was founded in 1875 at the Crown and Anchor Hotel with the original boathouse being located on Lock Street, Winnington Bank.

In 1907 the club moved to the Riversdale Estate before moving to its present location during the 1960s. Women were allowed to join as members in 1975 and in 1996 the club became part of the Project Oarsome Scheme.

== Honours ==
=== British champions ===
Year	Winning crew/s
1980	Men J18 1x
1986	Men 1x
1987	Women J18 2x
1999	Men J16 1x, Women J15 4x+
2000	Women J15 4x+
2001	Men J15 2x
2002	Men J18 2-
2003	Women 4x, Men J18 2-
2004	Open J18 1x
2014	Open J18 4x
2015	Open J16 4x
2017	Women J16 2x

== Notable members ==
- Adrienne Grimsditch
- Matt Langridge
