= Newark Rowing Club =

British rowing club

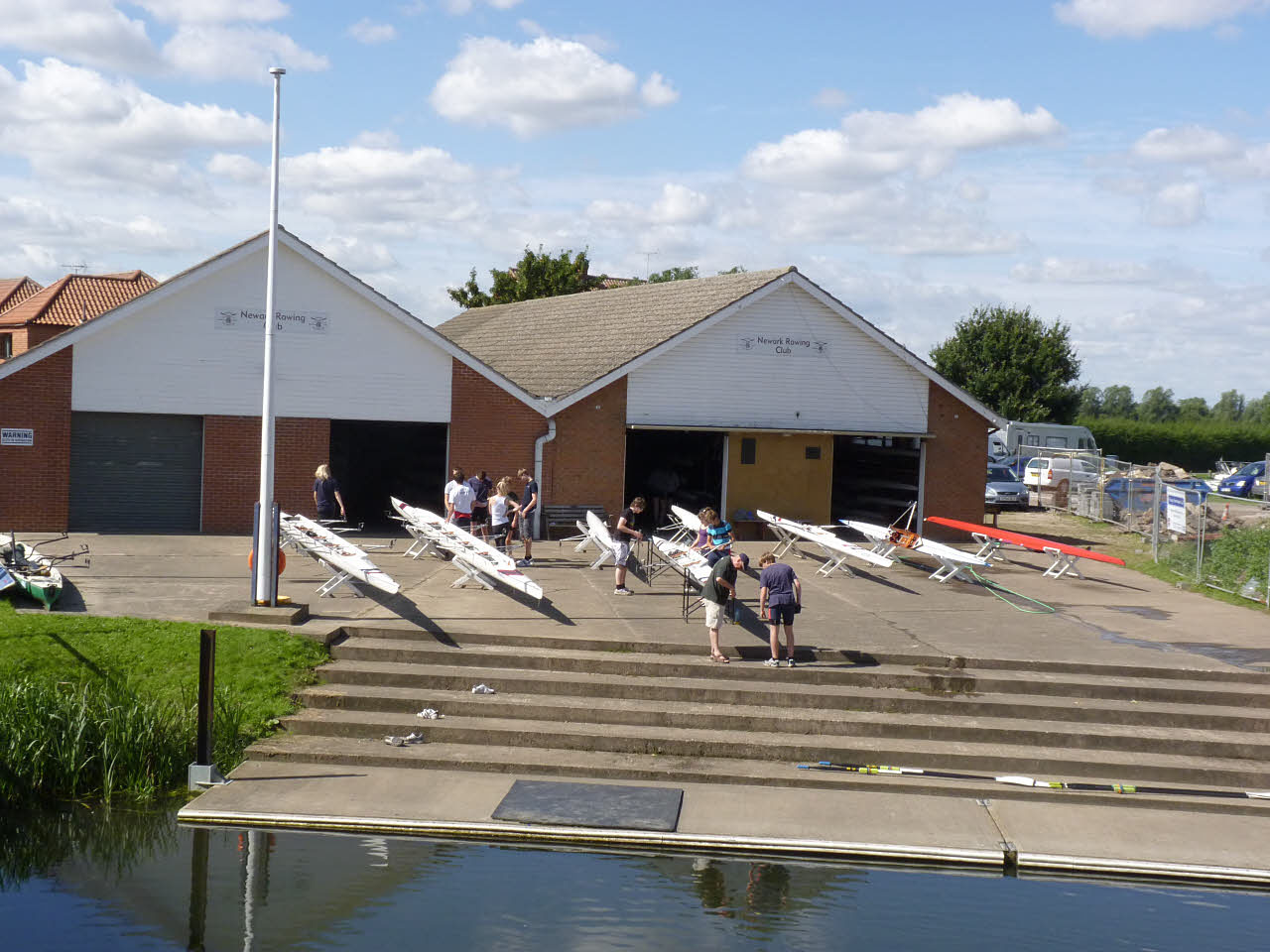

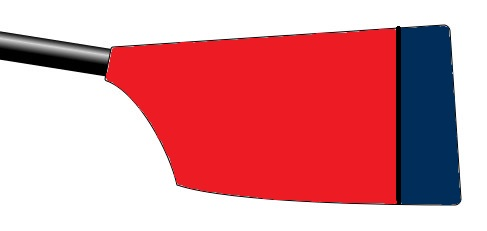
- Location: Farndon Road, Newark, Nottinghamshire, England
- Coordinates: 53.070367°N 0.824324°W
- Founded: 1873
- Affiliations: British Rowing (boat code NWK)
- Website: newarkrowingclub.co.uk

Newark Rowing Club is a rowing club on the River Trent, based at Farndon Road, Newark, Nottinghamshire, England. The club runs teams for all age groups.

== History ==
The club was founded in 1873, although it was referred to as the Newark Boating Club at the time.

The club won a national title with the Thames Rowing Club in 2014 when the Open junior under-18 double sculls at the 2014 British Rowing Junior Championships. In 2019, a record 132 finishers competed in the club's annual Head Race.

=== British champions ===
Year	Winning crew/s
1979	Open J14 1x
2003	Men J15 2x, Women J15 2x
2004	Women J16 2x
2009	Open J15 2x
2010	Women J14 1x
2011	Open J14 2x
2014	Open J18 2x
