= Monmouth Rowing Club =

Welsh rowing club

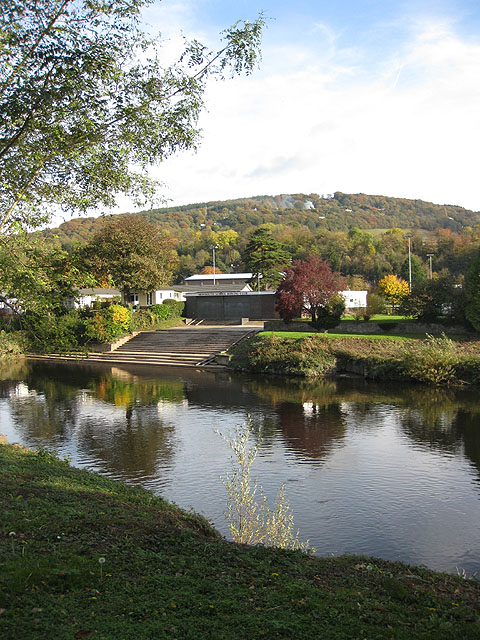

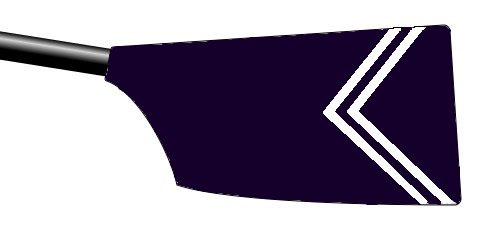
- Location: Monmouth, Wales
- Coordinates: 51.8133°N 2.7079°W
- Home water: River Wye
- Founded: 1928
- Affiliations: British Rowing boat code - MON; WARA
- Website: www.monmouthrc.org.uk

Events
- Monmouth Regatta; Monmouth Autumn Head; Monmouth Winter Head

Monmouth Rowing Club is located on the banks of the River Wye in Monmouth, the county town of the historic county of Monmouthshire, Wales. The club is affiliated with the Welsh Amateur Rowing Association (WARA) and hosts several annually organised race events.

== Location ==
Monmouth is the furthest south of the three rowing clubs on the River Wye; the other two being at Hereford and Ross-on-Wye. The boathouse is sited on the western bank of the river. All rowing activities take place upstream of the 17th-century Wye Bridge and during the summer are limited to the 2.25 kilometres (2,250 m) stretch of river between Monmouth and Hadnock. During times of higher river levels, typically over the winter months, it is possible to row 9 km upstream to the Symonds Yat rapids. Monmouth School boathouse stands on the opposite bank to the town club.

== History ==
Mentions of an original Monmouth Rowing Club existed in the 1870s, with results recorded from 1875 to 1884. The club returned from 1887 to 1888, following a meeting at the King's Head and a further mention followed in 1910, when the club competed at the Ross Regatta.

It is not known if the current club is connected to the original club in any way because it was thought that it had been founded in 1929 but uncovering of documents indicate an earlier date in mid-1928.

Originally, the club leased an existing warehouse to act as a boathouse until the mid-1960s when the current building was erected.

The clubhouse, gym and changing rooms attached to the boathouse were extended and renovated in 1995. The new facilities were officially opened by Steve Redgrave.

Currently, the Monmouth Rowing Club boathouse also plays host to boats and equipment from Haberdashers' Monmouth School for Girls Rowing Club (founded 1990) and Monmouth Comprehensive School Boat Club (founded 1992).

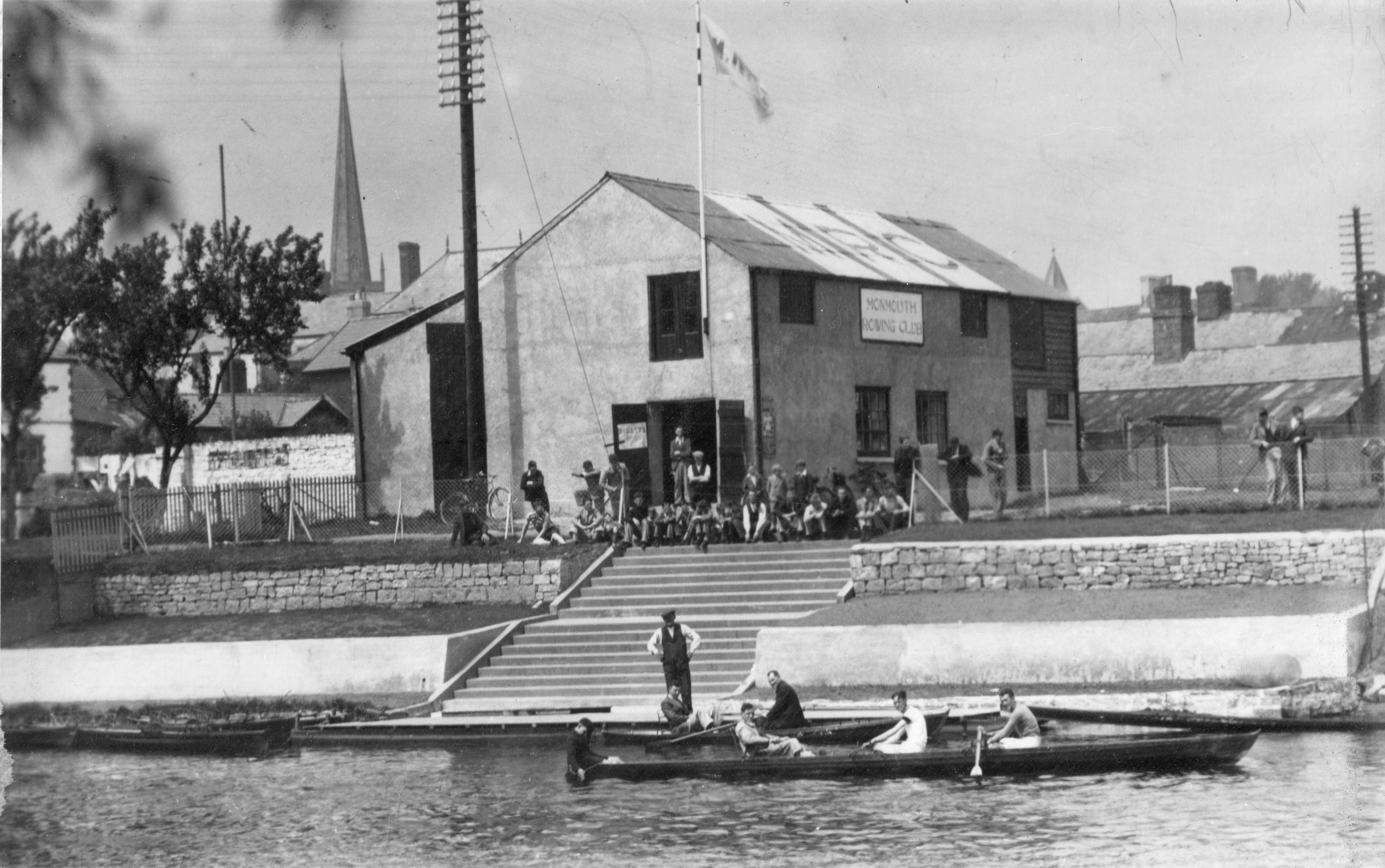
The rowing club in the 1930s

== Racing at Monmouth ==
Traditionally, Monmouth summer regatta has been held on the Sunday of the Spring Bank Holiday in late May with crews racing side by side over a straight 1,500 metres (1,600 yd) course (seniors) or 1,000 metres (1,100 yd) (veterans and juniors). In recent years a sprint regatta held over 750 metres (820 yd) has been added to the programme on the Saturday of the same weekend. Whilst multi-lane regattas, held on lakes and purpose built courses, have increased in popularity over recent years, Monmouth regatta still attracts a substantial number of entries (approx 400 boats) on both days, year on year.

Outside of the regatta season, Monmouth hosts two main Head of the River races: the Autumn Head, at the end of September, and the Winter Head in mid December. These are timed, processional races typically held over 2,250 metres (2,460 yd), although when conditions allow the course may be lengthened to approximately 5,000 metres (5,500 yd).

== Recent successes ==
Monmouth has developed a particularly strong men's veteran squad in recent years, culminating in their winning 4 titles at the National Veteran Rowing Championships of Great Britain in June 2009

== Honours ==
=== British champions ===
Year	Winning crew/s
1978	Women J18 1x
2010	Open 4x composite
