= St Andrew Boat Club =

Scottish rowing club

St^{1} Andrew Boat Club

- Motto: Rowing for all
- Location: Edinburgh, Scotland
- Coordinates: 55.927°N 3.233°W
- Home water: Union Canal
- Founded: 1846
- Key people: Sarah Whitley (President); Lindsay Flockhart (Captain)
- Colours: Blue
- Affiliations: Scottish Rowing
- Website: standrewboatclub.com

Events
- Silver Rudder

Distinctions
- Only rowing club in Edinburgh.^{1} (or St., or rarely Saint)

St Andrew Boat Club is alongside Meggetland Sports Complex, at Meggetland, on the Union Canal, in the city of Edinburgh, Scotland. SABC is affiliated to Scottish Rowing, the national governing body for rowing in Scotland.

== History ==
The club was founded in 1846.

George Ogilvie of Holefield farm via Kelso, Scotland – father of Scottish Border poet and Australian bush balladeer Will H. Ogilvie (1869–1963) – was one of the inaugural members, and in 1904 was at his death the club's oldest member.

== Training ==
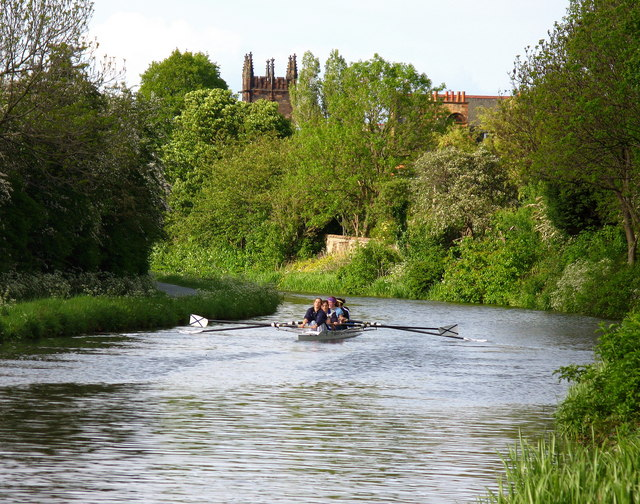
Club training during 2007

Training on the water usually takes place on a 1600m stretch of the Union Canal during the week. At weekends regular training sessions take place at Auchinstarry, the River Clyde in Glasgow or Strathclyde Country Park, Scotland's Olympic standard regatta course.

Land sessions take place across the road from the boat club, at Energy Gym.

== Squads ==
- Beginners and Novices
- Juniors (J13 - J18)
- Senior Men
- Senior Women
- Masters (Aged 27+)

== Silver Rudder ==
The Silver Rudder is the annual boat race between St Andrew Boat Club and Clyde Amateur Rowing Club (Glasgow), and takes place on the River Clyde in Glasgow.

== Honours ==
=== British champions ===
Year	Winning crew/s
1998	Women 1x
2014	Women J18 4x
2018	Women J15 1x
2019	Women J18 4-
2021	Open J16 2x

== Notable members ==
- Katherine Grainger DBE
- Sinead Jennings

== See also ==
- Scottish Rowing
- British Rowing
