= St Leonard's School Boat Club =

British rowing club

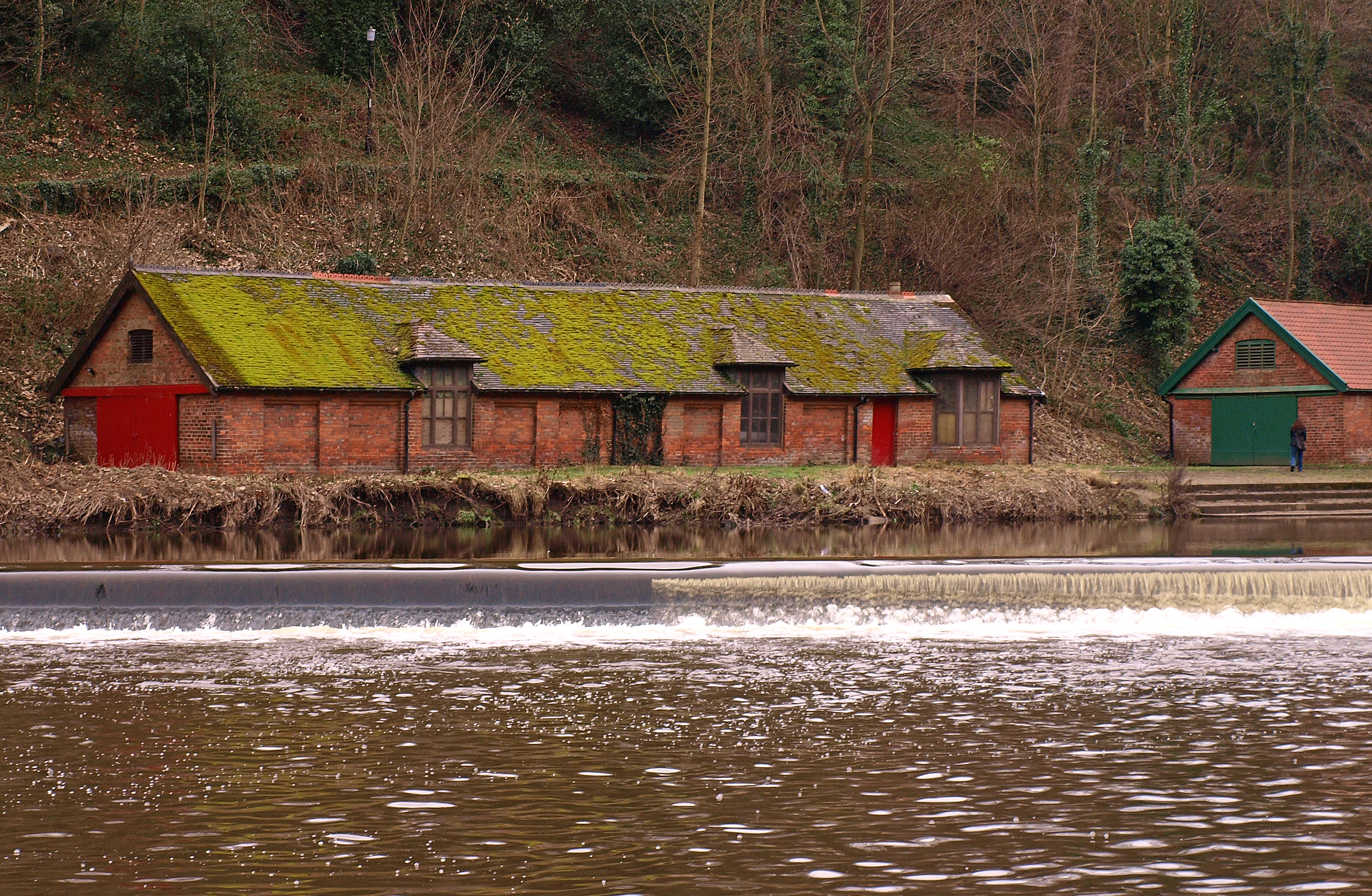

- The School boathouse is on the right (green)
- Location: University College Boathouse, Prebends Bridge, Durham, County Durham
- Coordinates: 54.772053°N 1.578740°W
- Founded: 1970s
- Affiliations: British Rowing (boat code SLS)
- Website: www.st-leonards.durham.sch.uk/sport-co-curricular/oarsome-rowing/

St Leonard's School Boat Club is a rowing club on the River Wear, based at Prebends Bridge, Durham, County Durham.

== History ==
The club was founded in 1970 by the woodwork teacher at the time Bill Parker and belongs to the St Leonard's Catholic School, Durham. St. Leonard's BC then took over the boathouse vacated by Consett Grammar School.

The club has produced multiple British champions.

== Honours ==
=== British champions ===
Year	Winning crew/s
1985	Women J16 4x+
1986	Women J18 8+
1992	Women J18 4+, Women J16 4+
1993	Women J18 4+, Women J16 2x
1994	Women J16 4+
1995	Men J16 4-, Women J18 2-
1996	Men J14 2x, Women J18 2-, Women J18 4+
1997	Men J18 4+
1998	Men J14 2x
1999	Men J15 2x
2000	Men J14 2x
2003	Men J14 4x+, Women J18 2-, Women J14 4x+
2004	Open J16 2-, Open J15 4x+, Women J15 4x+
2006	Open J18 4+

== See also ==
- List of rowing clubs on the River Wear
