= Bedford Girls' School Rowing Club =

Rowing club in Bedfordshire, England

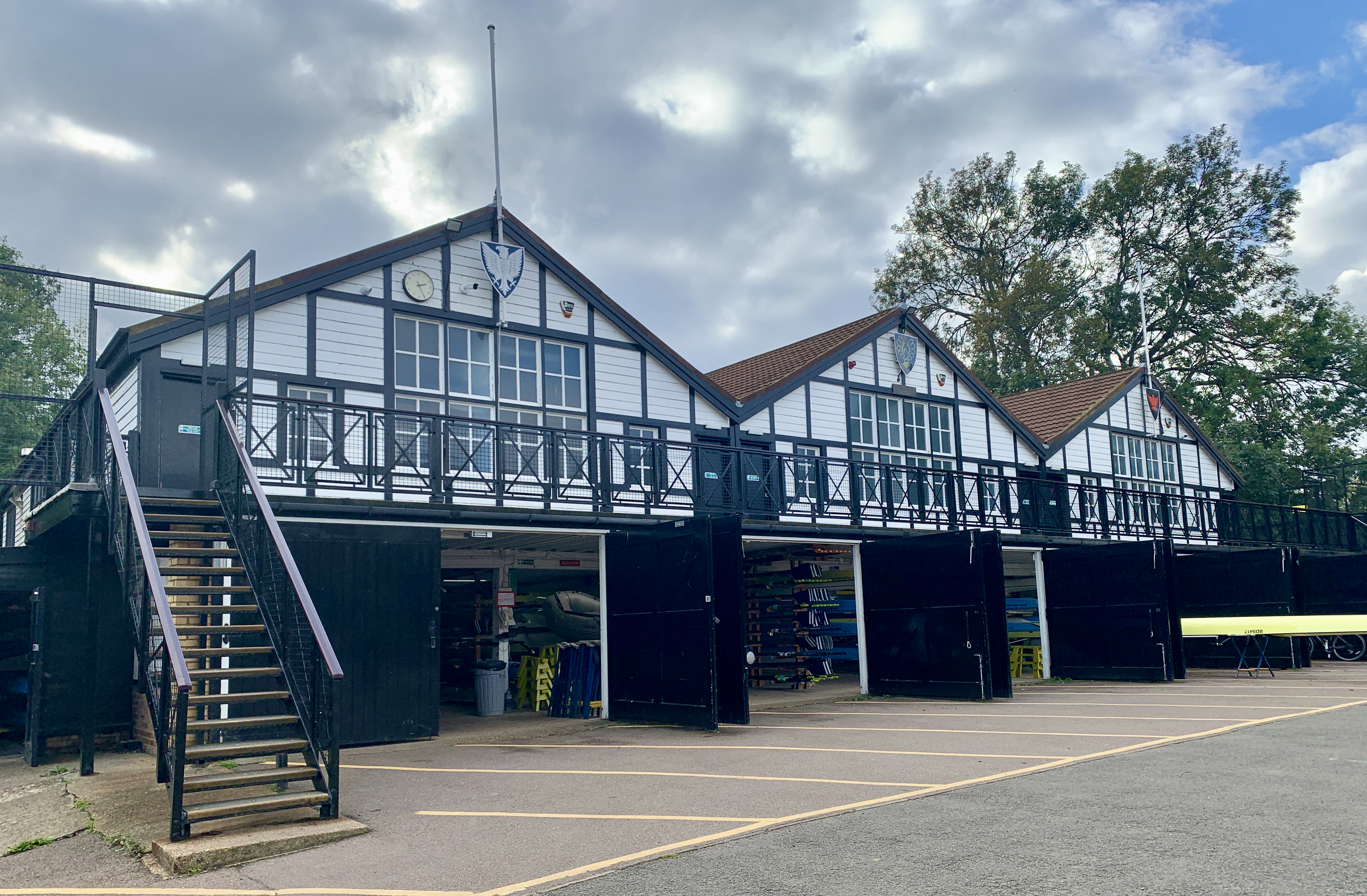

- The Bedford Girls' boahouse is in the centre
- Location: Harpur Trust / Longholme Boathouse, The Embankment by Butterfly Bridge, Bedford, Bedfordshire, England
- Coordinates: 52.133170°N 0.453998°W
- Affiliations: British Rowing boat code - BGS
- Website: www.bedfordgirlsschool.co.uk/444/holistic-approach/our-sporting-ethos/rowing

Bedford Girls' School Rowing Club is a rowing club based on the River Great Ouse at the Harpur Trust / Longholme Boathouse, The Embankment by Butterfly Bridge, Bedford, Bedfordshire, England.

== History ==
The boat club is owned by Bedford Girls' School with rowing being a major school sport.

In 2012, Bedford High School merged with Dame Alice Harpur School to become Bedford Girls' School, which also resulted in the Bedford High School Boat Club and Dame Harpur Alice School Boat Club merging and becoming the Bedford Girls' School Rowing Club. The boathouse is a three sectioned shared building with Bedford School Boat Club and Bedford Modern School Boat Club.

On 4 May 2022, the boathouse celebrated its 100th anniversary.

The club has produced multiple British champions.

== Honours ==
=== British champions (as Bedford High School) ===
Year	Winning crew/s
1987	Women J18 2x
1995	Women J18 4+
2000	Women J16 4+
2011	Women J18 4x, Women J15 2x

=== British champions (as Dame Alice Harpur School) ===
Year	Winning crew/s
2002	Women J18 1x, Women J18 4x, Women J16 1x
2009	Women 8+ composite
2010	Women 4x, composite Women 8+ composite
2011	Women J18 4x

=== British champions (as Bedford Girls' School) ===
Year	Winning crew/s
2014	Women J18 2x
