= Durham Amateur Rowing Club =

British rowing club

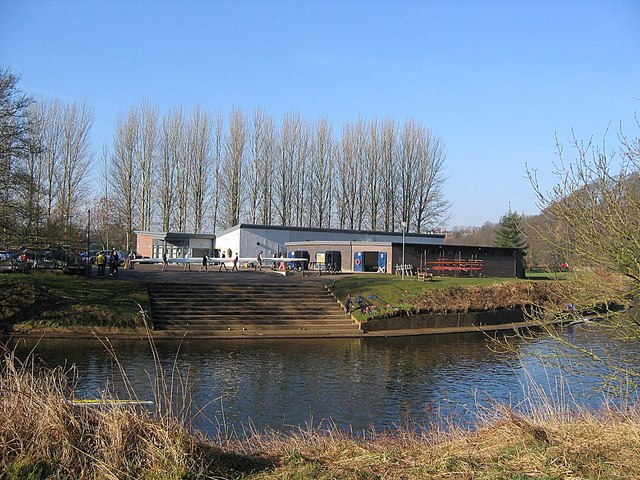

- Location: City Boathouse, Green Lane, Old Elvet, Durham, County Durham, England
- Coordinates: 54.773845°N 1.557710°W
- Founded: 1860
- Affiliations: British Rowing (boat code DUR)
- Website: www.durham-arc.org.uk

Durham Amateur Rowing Club (DARC) is a rowing club on the River Wear, based at City Boathouse, Green Lane, Old Elvet, Durham, County Durham, England.

== History ==
The club was founded in 1860 and is affiliated to British Rowing. The original boathouse was built in 1897 near Prebends Bridge and DARC shared the facilities with St Leonard's School Boat Club.

In 1969 DARC moved to its present boathouse site at Green Lane.

On 14 September 2007 the boathouse was rebuilt.

The club has produced multiple British champions, with the most recent being two national titles at the 2025 British Rowing Club Championships.

== Honours ==
=== British champions ===
Year	Winning crew/s
1974	Men 4x, Women 4x, Men L1x
1992	Men J16 2x, Men J14 1x, Women J16 2x
1996	Men J182x, Women J16 2x, Women J15 1x
1999	Men U23 1x
2000	Women J15 2x
2003	Women 4-, Women L4x
2007	Women J16 1x
2024	Open J15 1x
2025	Open J18 1x, Open J16 1x

== See also ==
- List of rowing clubs on the River Wear
