= University of Nottingham Boat Club =

British rowing club

- Location: Nottingham, UK
- Home water: River Trent and Holme Pierrepont National Watersports Centre
- Founded: 1892
- Key people: Ethan Page-Mason (President); Adrian Roberts (Chief Coach)
- Membership: c.120
- University: University of Nottingham
- Affiliations: British Rowing boat code - NGU
- Website: www.uonbc.com

University of Nottingham Boat Club (UoNBC) is the rowing club of the University of Nottingham based in the UK on the River Trent. Founded in 1892, the club has over 120 current active members, equally split between men's, women's and novice squads. The club is recognisable by its yellow blades and its green and yellow racing kit.

Ray Simms was appointed head coach of Nottingham University Boat Club in 2010. Having previously coached NCRA, winning several Henley medals and World Championships, he led the university's coaching team up until 2012. John McKirdy was appointed head coach in 2014, having been on the coaching staff since 2009.

== Boathouse ==
The boat house and 'shed' are situated between Lady Bay Bridge and Nottingham Forest F.C's City Ground on the south bank of the River Trent. The boat house consists of changing rooms, gym, a club room and kitchen.

== Recent Form ==
Recent achievements have included being runners up at Henley Women's Regatta in 2015, in the eight and at the EUSA Regatta (in the lightweight men's quad scull), weekend appearances at Henley Royal Regatta, and representation at the World Under 23 Championships.

=== BUCS Regatta ===
At the BUSA (now BUCS) regatta the club won the Victor Ludorum regularly until narrowly defeated by Durham in 2004. After the 2004 BUSA Regatta the club's men's squad was found to have broken the rules. Nottingham were disqualified from the MN8 (3rd), MJ8 (finalists) and MN4+ (1st) races and placed last in the Victor Ludorum. The club suspended six athletes and several officials resigned, they also apologised on their website homepage: "16/05/04 - NUBC is deeply apologetic to any other Universities that were affected by ineligible crew substitutions within the NUBC men's sweep squad at BUSA Regatta. The Club has taken action to ensure that such activities do not occur again". After a disciplinary hearing, BUSA announced further sanctions on 24 August, fining the club £500, stripping the university of all BUSA Championship points gained for Rowing that season and banning the men's rowing squad from all BUSA competitions for the next season.

The club had success at the 2010 BUCS regatta, winning in the Lightweight Men's VIII event, and subsequently adding the European University crown in the same event at the 2010 EUSA regatta.

=== Varsity ===
The Boat Club enjoyed an annual Varsity Match against Nottingham Trent University from 1994. This involved eight races: intake and senior, men's and women's, each racing a 1st and 2nd VIII over a course from Wilford Church to the Nottingham University Boathouse and was held in December. The 2000 races were held indoors on ergometers due to flooding while the 2001 race was curtailed by more flooding and high winds with the scores at two apiece. Up to 2003, Nottingham had won all but the 2001 event. Rowing is not part of the current Varsity Series against Nottingham Trent held since 2004.

Nottingham has also participated in the Malaysian Varsity Rowing tournament held in Kuala Lumpur, with victories in 2010 and 2011. As of 2015, Nottingham is not participating in this competition.

== Training Camps ==
The club has two annual training camps. The first is the pre-season camp in September, aimed at integrating incoming student athletes with the existing students. This lasts a week and is typically held abroad, with the 2019 destination being Temple-sur-Lot, France. The second is the Easter Holiday training camp which is always held in Nottingham at the National Watersports Centre due to it being the location of BUCS Regatta.

Varese 2007 Training Camp

== Honours ==
=== National champions ===
Year	Winning crew/s
2000	Men U23 1 x
2001	Men U23 1x
2005	Open U23 1 x

== See also ==
- University rowing in the United Kingdom
