= Royal Chester Rowing Club =

British rowing club

Royal Chester Boat Club
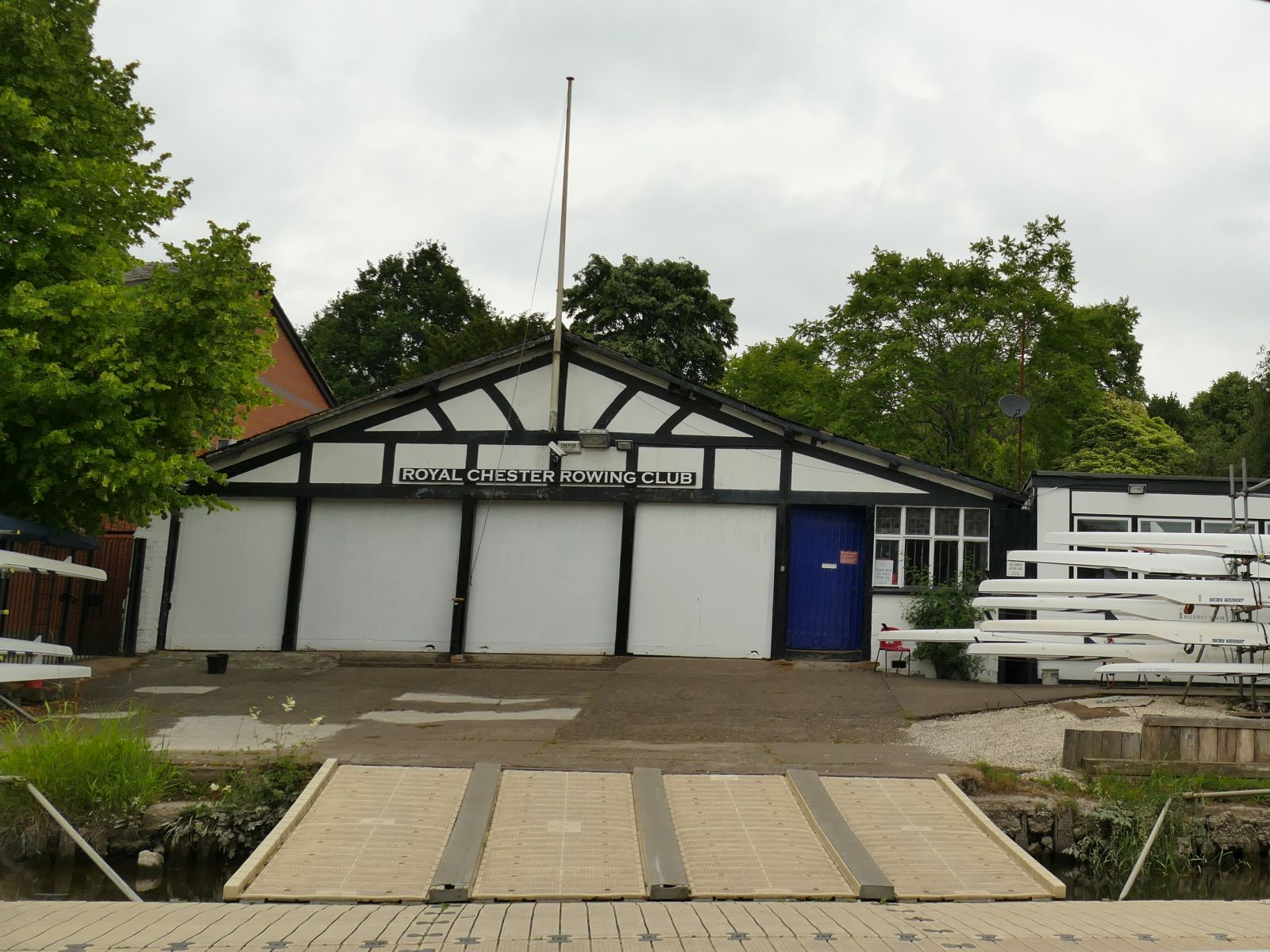

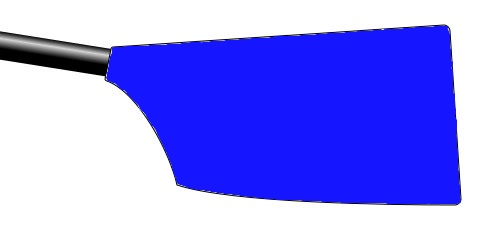
- Location: Chester, Cheshire, England
- Home water: River Dee
- Founded: 1838
- Affiliations: British Rowing boat code - RCH
- Website: www.royalchester.org

Events
- North of England Head, Chester Long Distance Sculls

Royal Chester Rowing Club is a rowing club based on the Groves in Chester, England. It rows on the River Dee with both men's and women's squads and members ranging from juniors of 14 upwards to Veteran oarsmen and women and hosts the North of England Head and Chester Long Distance sculls.

The boathouse is adjacent (on the east side) of The King's School Rowing Club.

== History ==
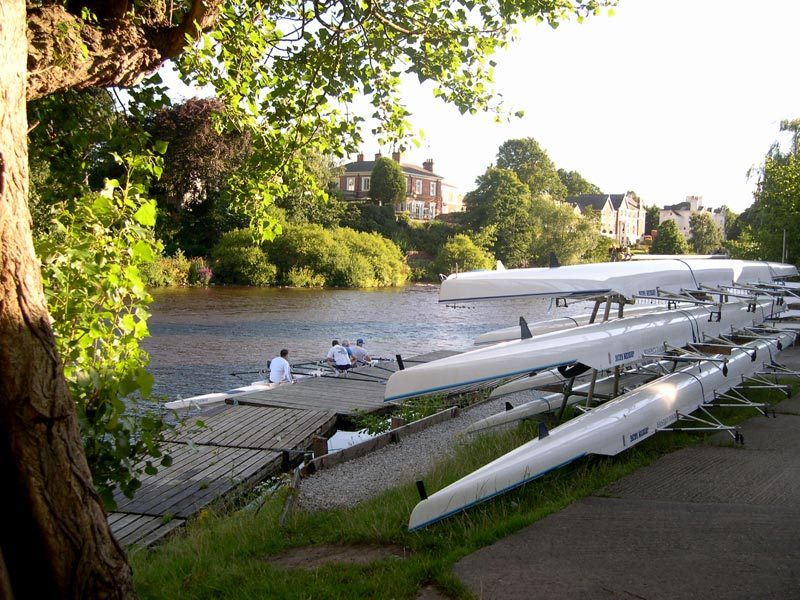
2007

The club was formed as the Chester Victoria Rowing Club on 9 July 1838, following a meeting at the Castle of Chester. Two years later, in 1840, the club added the appellation of Royal after gaining Royal Patronage, becoming Royal Chester Rowing Club.

Royals compete at events around the country, and in 2017 sent two eights to Henley Royal Regatta.

== Honours ==
=== Henley Royal Regatta ===
Year	Races won
1855	Stewards' Challenge Cup, Wyfold Challenge Cup
1856	Grand Challenge Cup, Ladies' Challenge Plate
1882	Thames Challenge Cup
1891	Wyfold Challenge Cup
1892	Stewards' Challenge Cup
1924	Wyfold Challenge Cup

=== British champions ===
Year	Winning crew/s
1986	Men J18 4+
1989	Men J18 4+
1994	Women 4x
2002	Women J18 2x
2003	Men J18 4x
2005	Open J16 4-
2010	Women J18 1x

== See also ==
- British Rowing
