= Worcester Rowing Club =

British rowing club

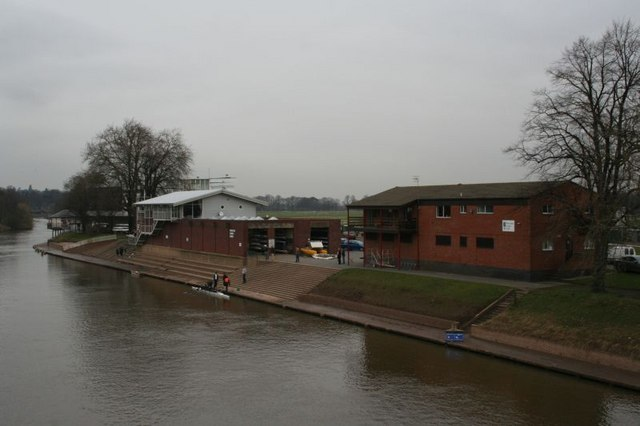

- Motto: Floreat semper fidelis civitas; Flourish ever-faithful city.
- Location: The Boathouse, Grandstand Road, Pitchcroft, Worcester, Worcestershire, West Midlands
- Coordinates: 52.1955°N 2.2322°W
- Home water: River Severn
- Founded: 1874
- Affiliations: British Rowing (boat code WRR)
- Website: wrc1874.co.uk

Events
- Worcester Head of the River (February); Worcester Spring Regatta (May); Worcester Autumn Regatta (September); Worcester Small Boats Head (October)

Notable members
- Anthony Hughes, Lord Hughes of Ombersley (b.1948)

Worcester Rowing Club is a rowing club on the River Severn, based at The Boathouse, Grandstand Road, Pitchcroft, Worcester, Worcestershire, West Midlands and backs on to Worcester Racecourse.

== History ==
The club was founded in 1874 from an amalgamation of several other clubs.

The club won the prestigious Wyfold Challenge Cup at the Henley Regatta in 2000 and has produced several national champions.

== Club colours ==
The club's colours are blades: white with two black bars flanking a red bar; kit: scarlet & black.

== Honours ==
=== Henley Royal Regatta ===
Year	Races won
2000	Wyfold Challenge Cup

== Honours ==
=== British champions ===
Year	Winning crew/s
1984	Men J16 2x
1989	Men J16 2x
1990	Men J18 1x, Women J16 1x
1992	Women J18 8+
1995	Women J16 2x
1996	Men L2x, Men U23 1x
2000	Men 8+
2005	Open 2-, Women 4-
2008	Women 2x, Women 2-
2011	Open L2-
