= Hereford Rowing Club =

British rowing club

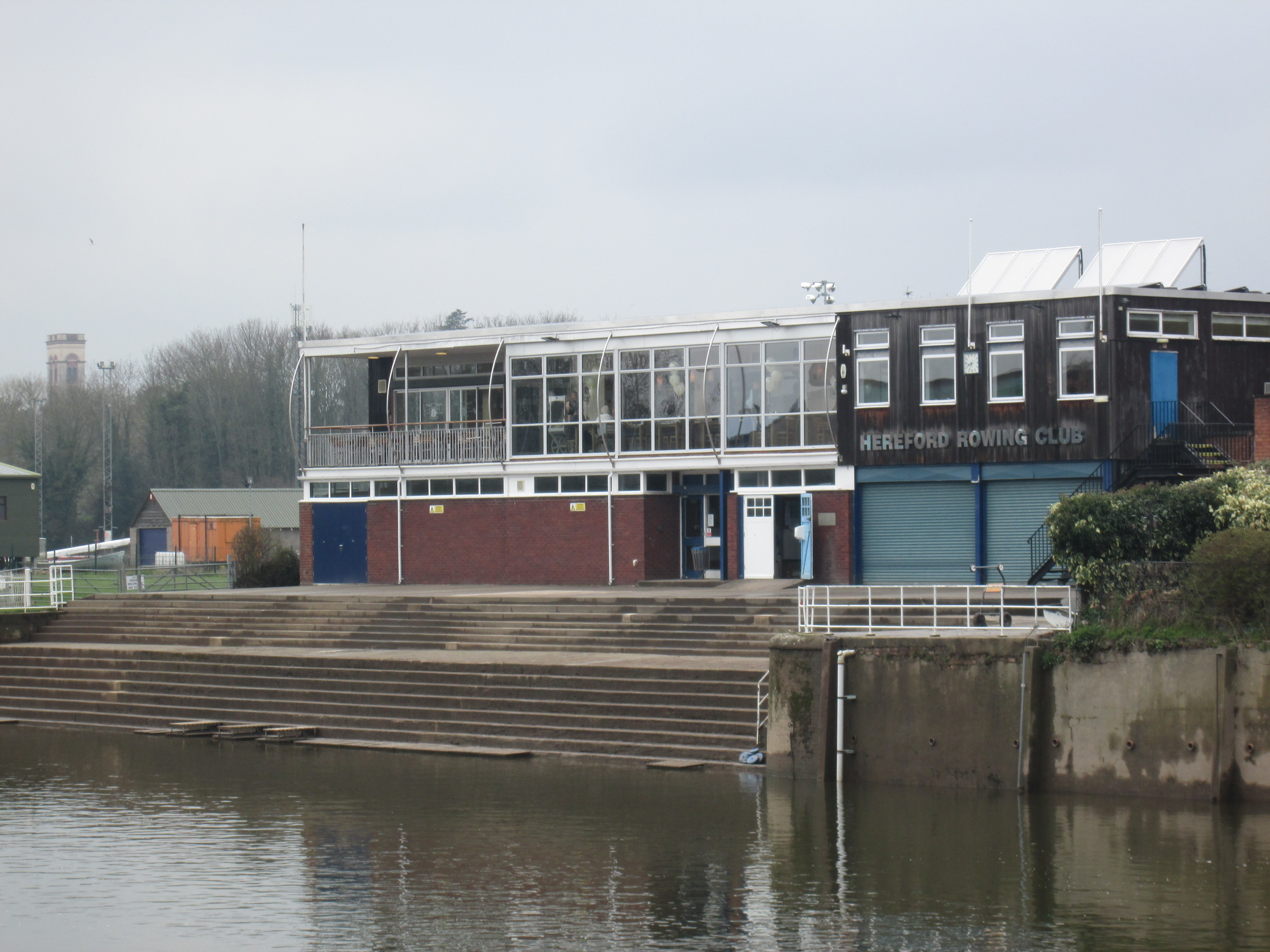

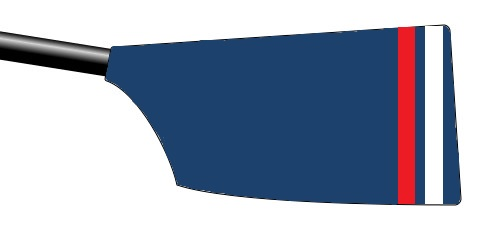
- Location: 37 Greyfriars Avenue, Hereford, Herefordshire, England
- Coordinates: 52.051931°N 2.721795°W
- Founded: 1861
- Affiliations: British Rowing (boat code HER)
- Website: www.herefordrc.co.uk

Hereford Rowing Club is a rowing club on the River Wye, based at 37 Greyfriars Avenue, Hereford, Herefordshire, England.

== History ==
The first Hereford Regatta took place in 1859 and the creation of the rowing club took place at the Saracen's Head Inn on Wednesday 26 June 1861, with the first President being F. Kempson Esq.

The present clubhouse was built in 1958 and the eights boathouse was built three years before in 1958, on the same site as the original boathouse. The club won the prestigious Britannia Challenge Cup at the Henley Regatta in 1971 and produced a national champion crew in 2010.

The club won a national title at the 2024 British Rowing Championships and the following year won three national titles at the 2025 British Rowing Club Championships.

== Honours ==
=== British champions ===
| Year | Winning crew/s |
|---|---|
| 1975 | Men J16 4- |
| 1977 | Men J18 8+ |
| 1983 | Men J18 2- |
| 1985 | Men J18 2- |
| 1996 | Women J14 1x |
| 1997 | Women 2x |
| 2000 | Men J14 1x |
| 2001 | Women 2x, Men J14 1x |
| 2003 | Women J18 1x |
| 2010 | Open 4x |
| 2024 | Open club 4+ |
| 2025 | Open 4-, Open club 8+, Open J14 4x+ |

=== Henley Royal Regatta ===
| Year | Winning crew |
|---|---|
| 1971 | Britannia Challenge Cup |

=== Notable members ===
- Colin Barratt
- Clive Roberts
