= Tiffin School Boat Club =

British rowing club

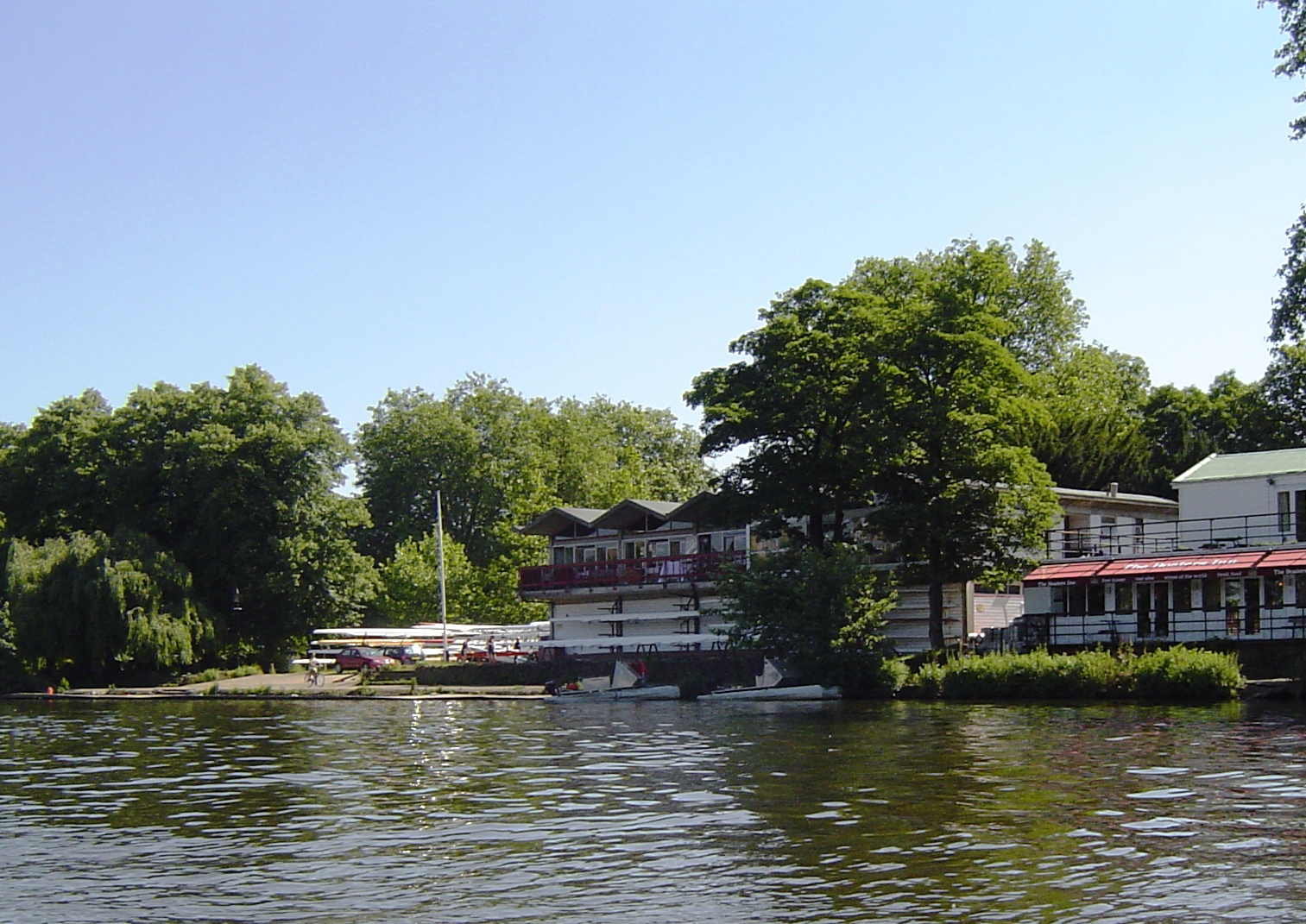

- Location: Kingston upon Thames, United Kingdom
- Coordinates: 51°25′8″N 0°18′20″W
- Home water: Between Kingston Bridge and Teddington Lock
- Founded: 1890
- Key people: Alex DiLuzio (Head Coach)
- Affiliations: British Rowing boat code - TFN
- Website: www.tiffinschoolboatclub.co.uk

The Tiffin School Boat Club (also known as TSBC) is an amateur rowing club, based in London, run by Tiffin School. It is based on the River Thames at Kingston upon Thames on the outskirts of Greater London in south-east England between Kingston Bridge and Teddington Lock.

Rowers enjoy one of the longest and calmest stretches of rowing water in the UK; 4.81 miles (7.74km) between Molesey Lock upstream to the south and downstream to Teddington Lock.

== Activities ==
TSBC, Kingston Rowing Club and Kingston Student Rowing Club share the boathouse located in Canbury Gardens on the Surrey bank, overlooking Steven's Eyot downstream. The site lease was renewed in 2010.

In the past it has hosted the Tiffin Small Boats Head. The club also organise a biennial sponsored row from Oxford to Kingston; the "OK Row".

The current head coach at the club is Alex DiLuzio, whilst the boatman, David White, manages all the club's equipment. The club has managed in the past to qualify boats for the Henley Royal Regatta.

The boat club usually accepts members of age groups J14 to J18 (or students in years 9 to 13). Generally, a series of tests consisting of ergometer trials, as well as a run, sees 30 students who trial in year 9 join the boat club. However, it is generally possible for willing students to join, without trial, later on in the school. The boat club will also accept younger members if they have previous rowing or sculling experience. Members may also continue to participate in TSBC activities after leaving Tiffin School.

Since 2011, the boat club has also accepted girls from the sister school, The Tiffin Girls' School. It is one of the few school rowing clubs in the state sector.

== Honours ==
=== Henley Royal Regatta ===
Year	Races won
1999	Fawley Challenge Cup

=== British champions ===
Year	Winning crew/s
1999	Men J18 4x, Men J16 4x
2001	Men J18 4x
2004	Open J16 4x
2005	Open J18 4x, Open J16 4x
2007	Open J15 4x+

== See also ==
- Rowing on the River Thames
