= Christchurch Rowing Club =

British rowing club

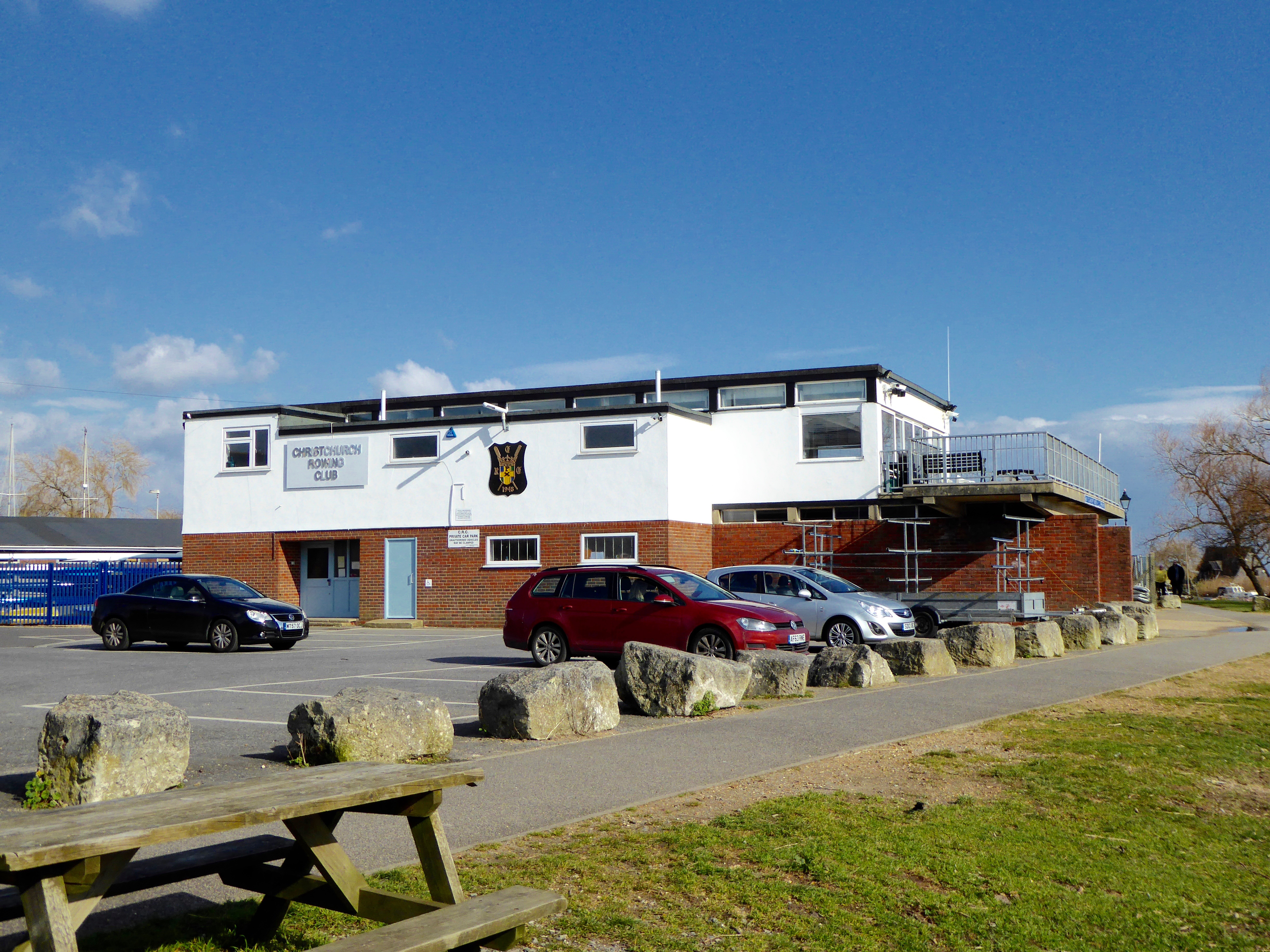

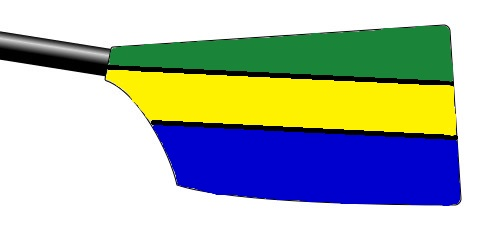
- Location: River Bank, Wick Lane, Christchurch, Dorset, England
- Coordinates: 50.730150°N 1.780390°W
- Founded: 1948
- Affiliations: British Rowing (boat code CHR)
- Website: www.christchurchrowingclub.co.uk

Christchurch Rowing Club is a rowing club on the River Stour, based at River Bank, Wick Lane, Christchurch, Dorset, England and is affiliated to British Rowing.

== History ==
The club was founded in 1948 before the boathouse moved to the current location in the mid 1960s with an extension being added in 2008. The club is also affiliated to the Hants and Dorset Amateur Rowing Association which governs coastal rowing.

The club has produced multiple British champions.

== Honours ==
=== British champions ===
| Year | Winning crew/s |
|---|---|
| 1982 | Men J18 2- |
| 1983 | Men coastal 4+ |
| 1984 | Women J18 4x, Women coastal 4+ |
| 1985 | Men J14 1x, Men coastal 4+ |
| 1986 | Men J16 1x, Men coastal 4+, Women coastal 4+ |
| 1987 | Men coastal 4+ |
| 1988 | Women coastal 4+ |
| 1989 | Men coastal 4+ & Men coastal J2-, Women coastal J4+ |
| 1990 | Women coastal 4+ |
| 1991 | Men coastal 1x, Men coastal 2- |
| 1992 | Men coastal 2-, Women coastal 4+ |
| 1993 | Women coastal 4+ |
| 1994 | Women J14 2x, Men coastal 2-, Men coastal J2- |
| 1995 | Women J15 2x |
| 1996 | Women J16 4x |
| 1997 | Women J18 4x |
| 2002 | Men coastal 4+ |
| 2010 | Women J16 2x |
| 2012 | Open J16 1x |
