= Monmouth Comprehensive School =

Coordinates: 51°34′29″N 03°02′36″W

Location
- Old Dixton Road; Monmouth, Monmouthshire; Wales

Information
- Type: Comprehensive School
- Motto: Learning To Lead Our Lives (Welsh: Dysgu Trwy Arwain)
- Local authority: Monmouthshire County Council
- Chair of governors: Victoria Smith
- Headteacher: Hugo Hutchinson
- Gender: Mixed
- Age: 11 to 18
- Enrolment: 1700
- Colour: Navy Light Blue
- Website: http://monmouthcomprehensive.org.uk/

Monmouth Comprehensive School (Welsh: Ysgol Gyfun Trefynwy) is a comprehensive secondary school for pupils aged 11–18, situated in Monmouth, Monmouthshire, Wales.

== History ==
The school was established in 1903 when it was known as William Jones Elementary School. This sandstone building is at the west end of the site and was built for the Haberdashers Company. This was probably designed by Henry Stock. New buildings were built at the end of the war in what has been described as an undemonstrative style. In September 1947 it became the Monmouth Secondary Modern School, before changing to its current name in September 1977. At that time further classroom blocks were built at the north east end of the site. The school has Monmouth Leisure Centre in its grounds.

== Welsh ==
The school teaches Welsh as the subject has been compulsory in Wales since the Welsh Language Act of 1993. However, in 2009 there were still students being sent to John Kyrle High School in Ross-on-Wye, England where the Act does not apply. At the same time another bus brought children from Ross to the school where they would learn Welsh.

== Previous headteachers ==
- 1903: J.D. Gregory (Master)
- 1906: R. Bradbury M.A.
- 1908: C.J. Powell M.A.
- 1926: J.E. Protheroe B.A.
- 1955: W.H. Sparkes B.Sc.
- 1966: J Alderton B.A.
- 1984: D.A.L Every B.A., M.Ed, F.R.G.S
- 2001: s C.J Herman M.A.
- 2011: T. Bird B.Sc & R.V. Davies B.A.
- 2012: R.V. Davies B.A.
- 2021: H. Hutchison M.A. (current)

== Outside the classroom ==
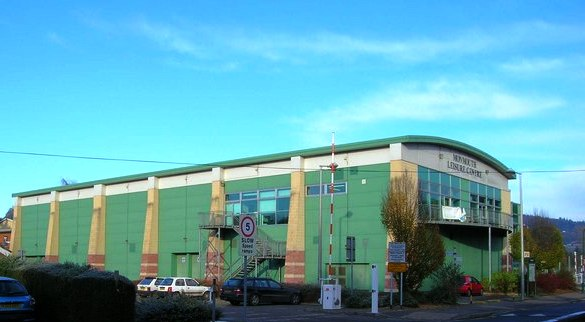
The Leisure Centre

Monmouth Leisure Centre is within the grounds of the school and this has a swimming pool, squash courts and space for indoor and outdoor sports. The Year 11 rugby league team were crowned Carnegie Schools Welsh champions. Many students represent the county and national teams. Three students were chosen as Olympic Ambassadors and two were Olympic Torch bearers in 2012.

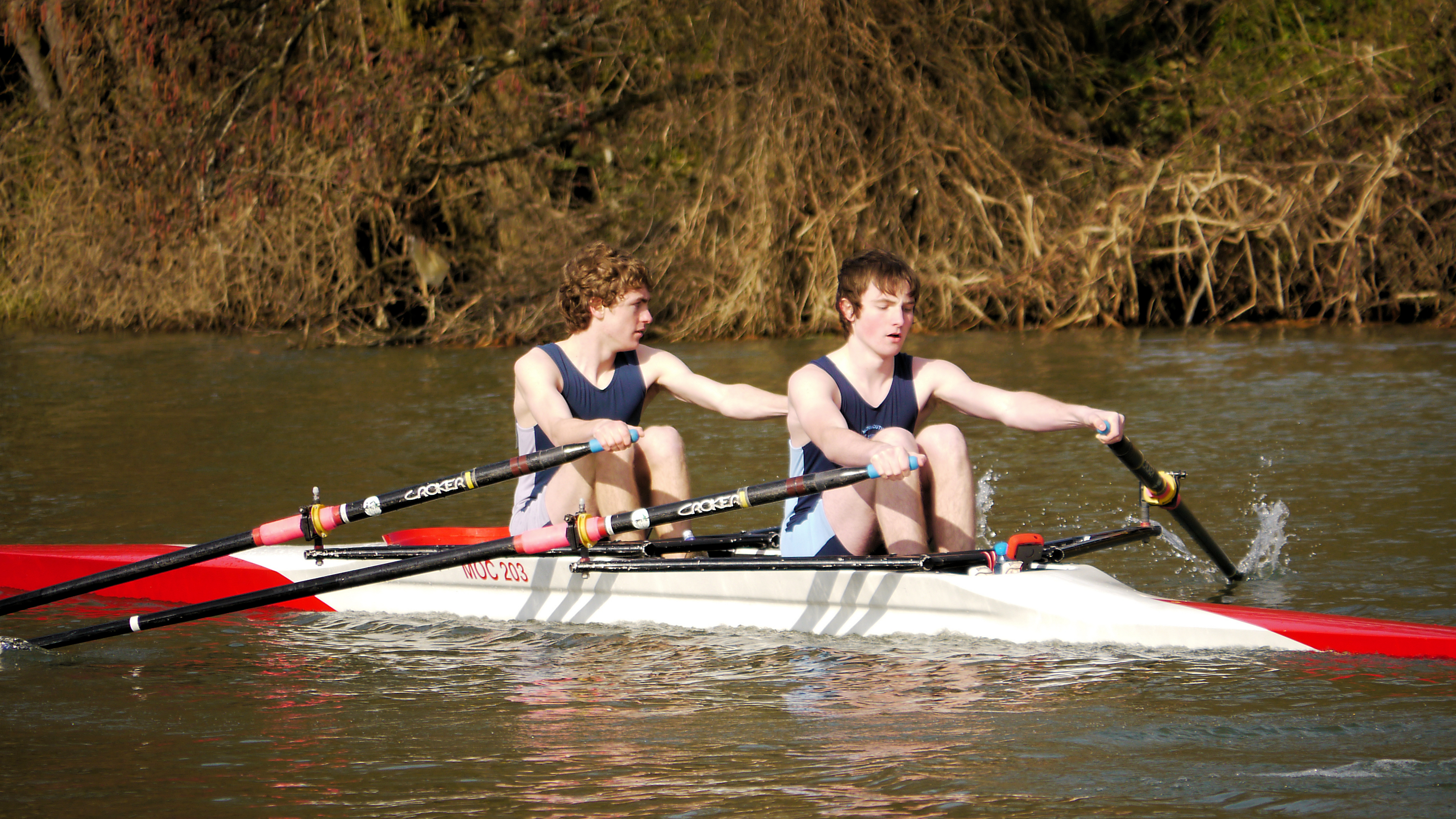
Rowing club

The school runs the Monmouth Comprehensive School Boat Club which is affiliated to British Rowing (boat code MOC). It is the only fully comprehensive school rowing club in England and Wales. Many students compete in national championships with some gaining international recognition. At the British Rowing Championships, the women's J16 single scull won the national title in 2013 featuring Rio Chandler and the Open J16 quad scull crew won the national title in 2017.

The Eco-Schools Committee is an established forum for environmental issues in Monmouth. Activities that were undertaken included a paper mountain to raise awareness about the school's paper use, an ecotree, and a logo competition.
