= National Schools' Regatta =

Rowing regatta for junior rowers in Great Britain

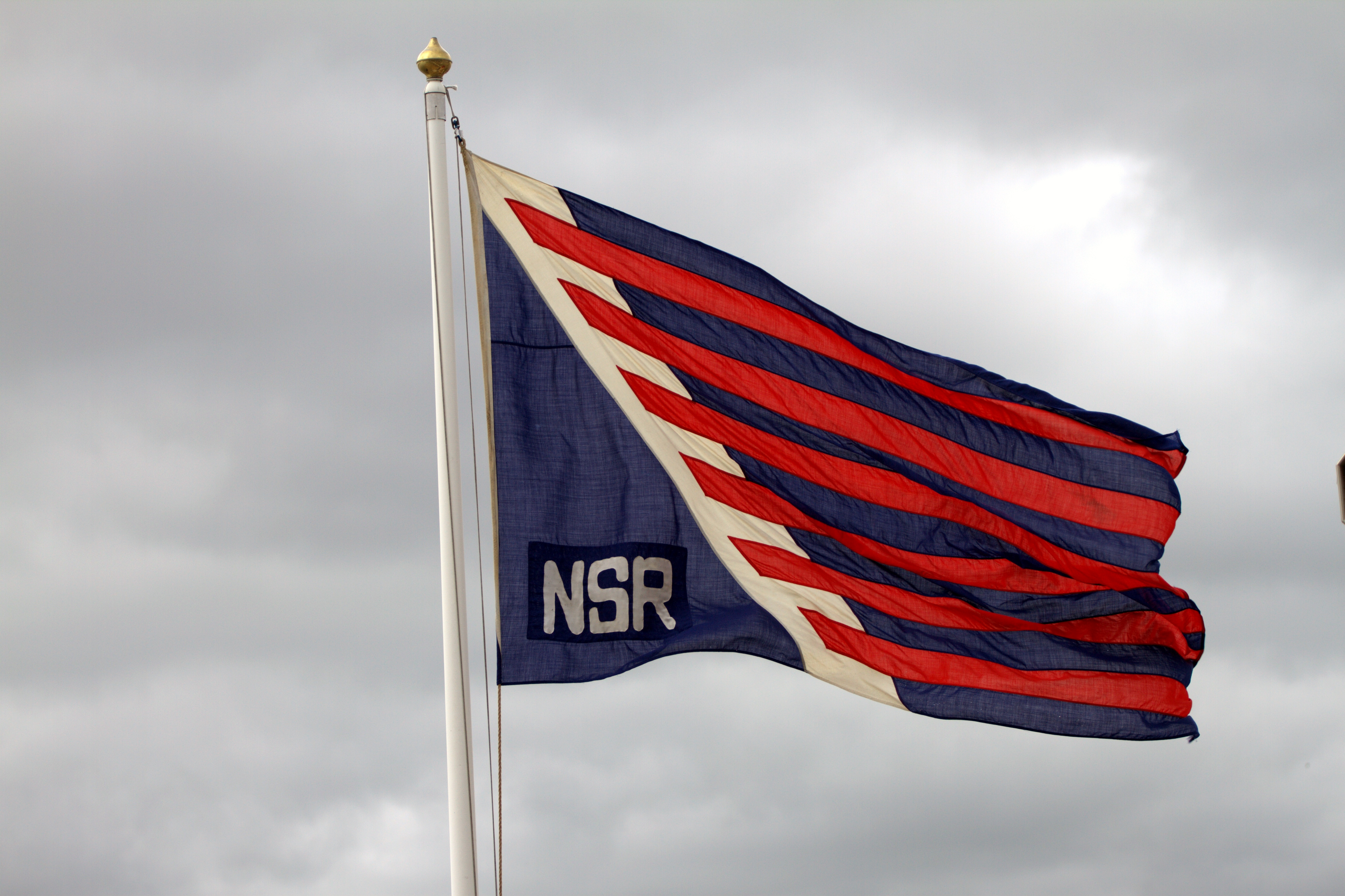
- National Schools' Flag
- Frequency: Annual
- Locations: Dorney Lake, Holme Pierrepont.
- Years active: 1947 – present
- Previous event: 22 – 24 May 2026
- Next event: 28 – 30 May 2027
- Participants: approx 4,500
- Website: nationalschoolsregatta.co.uk

National Schools' Regatta is the largest rowing regatta for junior rowers in Great Britain. Held annually in May, the three day regatta offers events for junior rowers between the categories J14 and J18 (the number being the age group).

== History ==
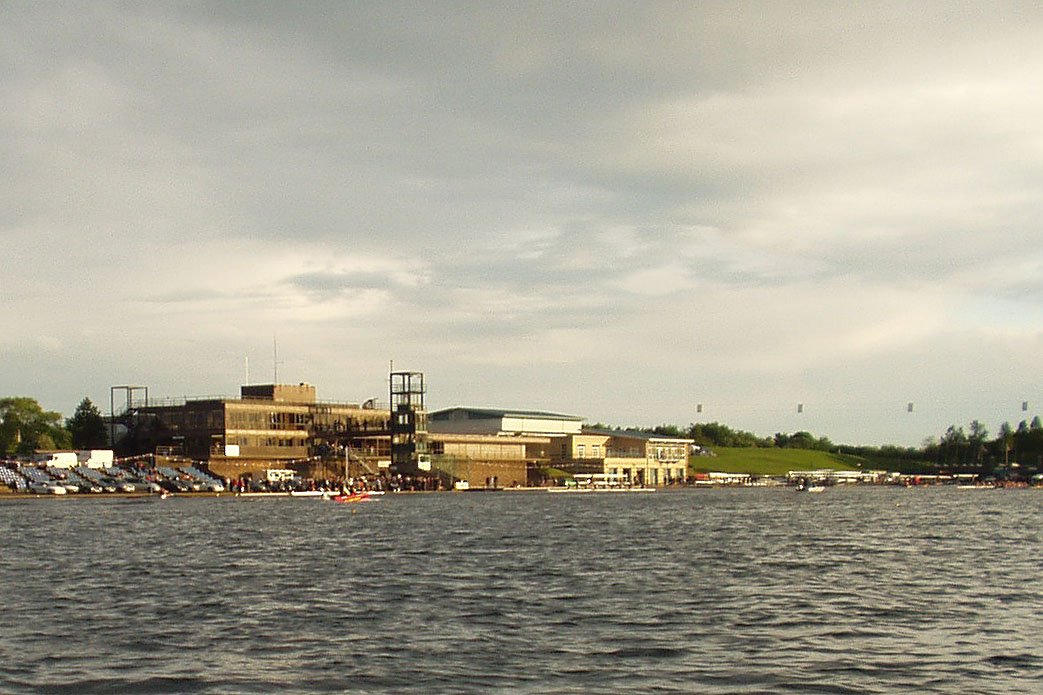
Holme Pierrepont in 2004

The regatta was first raced in 1947 as the "Colts and Third Eights Regatta", when Desmond Hill the master-in-charge of rowing at St Edward's School, Oxford, invited the third VIIIs of Shrewsbury School, Bedford School and Radley College to race against St. Edwards in Godstow. The event was repeated annually at a number of locations in the Thames Valley, and then later at Pangbourne, until in 1963 when it moved to the Child Beale Trust Estate. With the growth of the regatta and the addition of many more events for junior crews the regatta changed its name to "The National Schools' Regatta" in 1964.

In 1973, the regatta moved to the Holme Pierrepont National Watersports Centre, due to the frequency of unfair weather conditions at the Child Beale Estate, and the ability to hold six lane racing at Holme Pierrepont. Weather conditions continued to be an issue for school rowing and the 2008 edition was cancelled after three 1st VIIIs, entered in the Childe Beale Cup, from The King's School, Canterbury, Bedford Modern School, and Shiplake College, swamped. It was decided by the officials to completely cancel the rest of the racing for both the Saturday and Sunday. The officials were criticised for not cancelling the event earlier and led to calls for the regatta to be moved to Dorney Lake, where the 2012 Olympics rowing events took place.

Owing to Holme Pierrepoint having organised a triathlon over the desired weekend, the organisers were forced to relocate the regatta to Dorney Lake in 2016, where it was held from 2017 onwards. The event was cancelled in 2020 due to the COVID-19 pandemic.

In 2021, Eton College won the 1st, 2nd & 3rd eight events and in 2024 St Paul's School repeated the success; it was the fourth and fifth times respectively that this has been achieved in the regatta's history.

In 2025, the event returned to the National Water Sports Centre in Nottingham. Racing once again suffered from poor weather conditions, and the committee decided to cancel Sunday's events as a result.

After a review of the 2025 regatta, it was announced that the regatta committee had agreed to host the event at Dorney Lake once again for at least 5 years, starting with the 2026 event. The regatta chairman cited capactiy grounds as a leading factor in the decision.

== Past winners ==
=== Queen Mother Challenge Cup (Ch.8+) ===
The Queen Mother Challenge Cup for championship eights is the regatta's premier event, featuring the first eights of the traditional, 'championship' rowing schools of England. The event attracts approximately 12 entries each year, with smaller schools usually entering the Child Beale Cup for School eights. The Queen Mother forms part of the title known as 'The Triple', which also consists of Championship eights at the Schools' Head of the River Race and The Princess Elizabeth Challenge Cup at Henley Royal Regatta. Due to the high level of competition, the Queen Mother Challenge Cup has only been won by ten private (fee-paying) and one state school:

Eton College (20 wins), Hampton School (6 wins), Radley College (6 wins), Abingdon School (5 wins), St. Edward's School (4 wins), St Paul's School (4 wins), Shrewsbury School (3 wins), Westminster School (2 wins), Pangbourne College (1 win), Wallingford School (1 win), Shiplake College (1 win).

The other schools that have come close to winning but thus far only achieved silver medals are Emanuel School in 1975 and 1981, Bedford School in 1978, King's School Chester in 1984 (by just one foot), 1985, and 1992, Kingston Grammar in 1994, Canford School in 2004, and King's College School, Wimbledon in 2021.

- 1971 - Hampton School
- 1972 - Eton College
- 1973 - Eton College
- 1974 - Eton College
- 1975 - Radley College
- 1976 - Shrewsbury School
- 1977 - Eton College
- 1978 - Eton College
- 1979 - St Edward's School
- 1980 - Wallingford School
- 1981 - Radley College
- 1982 - Shrewsbury School
- 1983 - Eton College
- 1984 - St Edward's School
- 1985 - Hampton School
- 1986 - Hampton School
- 1987 - Cancelled due to high winds
- 1988 - Hampton School
- 1989 - Eton College
- 1990 - Eton College
- 1991 - Eton College
- 1992 - Hampton School
- 1993 - St Edward's School
- 1994 - Eton College
- 1995 - Eton College
- 1996 - Eton College
- 1997 - Radley College
- 1998 - Eton College
- 1999 - Hampton School
- 2000 - Radley College
- 2001 - Radley College
- 2002 - Abingdon School
- 2003 - Pangbourne College
- 2004 - Abingdon School
- 2005 - Eton College
- 2006 - Shrewsbury School
- 2007 - Eton College
- 2008 - Cancelled due to high winds
- 2009 - Eton College
- 2010 - Eton College
- 2011 - Eton College
- 2012 - Abingdon School
- 2013 - Abingdon School
- 2014 - Abingdon School
- 2015 - Westminster School
- 2016 - Westminster School
- 2017 - St Paul's School
- 2018 - St Paul's School
- 2019 - St Paul's School
- 2020 - Cancelled due to the COVID 19 pandemic
- 2021 - Eton College
- 2022 - Eton College
- 2023 - St Edward's School
- 2024 - St Paul's School
- 2025 - Shiplake College
- 2026 - Radley College

=== The Aylings Challenge Cup (ChG.8+) ===
The Aylings Challenge Cup for Championship Girls Eights has become the blue riband event for junior women, with increasing entries in recent years to match the increase of junior women's rowing across the UK. A notable success has been that of Headington School who retained the trophy for 9 consecutive years between 2009 and 2017 and have won the event a record 12 times. The Aylings Challenge Cup makes up one of the three trophies for the Junior Women's Eights Triple, including Girls' Ch8+ at Schools' Head of the River and the Prince Philip Challenge Trophy at Henley Royal Regatta.

- 1990 - George Watson's College
- 1991 - George Watson's College
- 1992 - Kingston Grammar School
- 1993 - Lady Eleanor Holles School
- 1994 - Lady Eleanor Holles School
- 1995 - Lady Eleanor Holles School
- 1996 - Lady Eleanor Holles School
- 1997 - Lady Eleanor Holles School
- 1998 - Lady Eleanor Holles School
- 1999 - Lady Eleanor Holles School
- 2000 - Lady Eleanor Holles School
- 2001 - Headington School
- 2002 - Headington School
- 2003 - King's School Worcester
- 2004 - Kingston Grammar School
- 2005 - Cancelled
- 2006 - Molesey Boat Club
- 2007 - Lady Eleanor Holles School
- 2008 - Cancelled
- 2009 - Headington School
- 2010 - Headington School
- 2011 - Headington School
- 2012 - Headington School
- 2013 - Headington School
- 2014 - Headington School
- 2015 - Headington School
- 2016 - Headington School
- 2017 - Headington School
- 2018 - Henley Rowing Club
- 2019 - Lady Eleanor Holles School
- 2020 - Cancelled
- 2021 - Lady Eleanor Holles School
- 2022 - Henley Rowing Club
- 2023 - Headington School
- 2024 - Hinksey Sculling School
- 2025 - Shiplake College
- 2026 - Shiplake College

=== Non-Championship Eights ===
Non-Championship Eights (formerly the Child Beale trophy for First Eights) was an event for School and Club VIIIs and was traditionally entered by smaller and less well established or funded schools. There is a similar event named First Eights at Schools' Head of the River. The event was last held in 2019. One month later at Henley, Championship and Non-Championship eights race together in the Princess Elizabeth Challenge Cup.

- 2009 - Bedford Modern School
- 2010 - Eton College
- 2011 - St Joseph's College
- 2012 - King's College School
- 2013 - St George's College
- 2014 - Pangbourne College
- 2015 - Shiplake College
- 2016 - London Oratory School
- 2017 - Molesey Boat Club
- 2018 - Bedford School
- 2019 - Monmouth School
- Discontinued

=== Course Records ===
Event name	Club Name	Year	Time	Notes
Championship Eight	Radley College Boat Club	2026	5:43.00	
Championship Girls' Eight	Headington School Oxford Boat Club	2026	6:31.39	In Semi-Final
Non-Championship Eight	Monmouth School	2019	5:54.59	Event Discontinued
Second Eight	Radley College Boat Club	2026	6:00.08	
Girls' Second Eight	Henley Rowing Club	2019	6:49.01	
Third Eight	Shiplake College Boat Club	2026	6:03.77	
Championship Quad	Henley Rowing Club	2019	6:02.14	
Championship Girls' Quad	Marlow Rowing Club	2026	6:44.25	
Second Quad	Leander Club	2019	6:10.20	
Girls' Second Quad	Latymer Upper School	2016	7:07.10	
Championship Coxless Four	Hampton School Boat Club	1999	6:13.75	
Championship Girls' Coxless Four	Sir William Perkins's School Boat Club	2026	7:01.46	
Championship Coxed Four	Eton College Boat Club	2016	6:27.70	
School Coxed Four	Westminster School Boat Club	2019	6:40.95	In Heat, Event Discontinued
Girls' Coxed Four	Kingston Rowing Club	2019	7:22.73	
Championship Pair	Radley College Boat Club	2019	6:50.97	
Championship Girls' Pair	Kingston Rowing Club	2019	7:37.25	
Championship Double	Windsor Boys' School Boat Club	2022	6:38.61	
Championship Girls' Double	Hartpury University and College	2024	7:21.07	
Championship Single	Hartpury University and College	2024	7:08.33	Elliott Donovan-Davies
Championship Girls' Single	Coleraine Grammar School	2019	7:54.88	Molly Curry
J16 Championship Eight	St. Pauls School	2026	5:55.91	
J16 Championship Girls' Eight	Henley Rowing Club	2019	6:51.60	
J16 Open Second Eight	Radley College Boat Club	2026	6:16.85	
J15 Championship Eight	Norwich School	2019	6:16.52	
J15 Open Coxed Quad	Windsor Boys' School Boat Club	2024	6:42.45	
J15 Girls’ Coxed Quad	Great Marlow School	2024	7:31.08	Dorney Lake 2km course
