= 1992 British Rowing Championships =

- Venue: National Water Sports Centre
- Location: Holme Pierrepont (Nottingham)
- Dates: 17–19 July 1992

The 1992 National Rowing Championships was the 21st edition of the National Championships, held from 17–19 July 1992 at the National Water Sports Centre in Holme Pierrepont, Nottingham.

== Senior ==
=== Medal summary ===
Event	Gold	Silver	Bronze
Men 1x	Leander; Calman MacLennan	Tideway Scullers School; George Attewell	Thames; Sam Allpass
Men 2+	Rob Roy	City of Oxford	Thames Tradesmen
Men 2x	Molesey	Rob Roy	Worcester
Men 2-	Goldie	London / Upper Thames	Thames
Men 4-	NCRA	Tideway Scullers School	London University
Men 4+	London	Nottingham & Union	Edinburgh University
Men 4x	NCRA	Star Club / Tideway Scullers School	Colet / Kingston / Queens Tower / Molesey
Men 8+	Nottingham / City of Cambridge / London	Goldie	Upper Thames
Women 1x	Rob Roy; Phoebe White	Sue Appelboom	
Women 2x	Runcorn / Staines; Helen Mangan & Trisha Corless	Kingston / Staines	Marlow
Women 2-	Thames Tradesmen	GB national junior squad	Kingston / Tideway Scullers School
Women 4+	Staines	Nottingham	Bedford
Women 4x	Hollingworth Lake / Tideway Scullers School / London University	Derby / Exeter / Nottingham & Union	Kingston
Women 4-	Thames Tradesmen / London University	Tideway Scullers School	Lea
Women 8+	Thames; Guin Batten	Cambridge University	Weybridge

== Lightweight ==
=== Medal summary ===
Event	Gold	Silver	Bronze
Men 1x	NCRA		
Men 2x	Bedford		
Men 2-	London / Upper Thames		
Men 4-	NCRA		
Men 4x	Composite		
Men 8+	NCRA		
Women 1x	Rob Roy		
Women 2x	Runcorn / Staines		
Women 2-	Thames Tradesmen		
Women 4-	Thames Tradesmen / London University		

== Under-23 ==
=== Medal summary ===
Event	Gold	Silver	Bronze
Men 1x	Tideway Scullers School		

== Junior ==
=== Medal summary ===
Event	Gold	Silver	Bronze
Men 1x	Walton		
Men 2-	Emanuel School	Abingdon School	
Men 2x	St George's College		
Men 2+	Marlow		
Men 4-	Bedford Modern School		
Men 4+	Shiplake College		
Men 4x	Marlow		
Men 8+	Abingdon School	King's School Chester	Kingston / Westminster
Men J16 1x	Stirling		
Men J16 2-	Belmont Abbey School		
Men J16 2x	Durham / Durham School		
Men J16 4+	Cheltenham College		
Men J16 4-	Kingston Grammar School		
Men J16 4x	Marlow		
Men J16 8+	Abingdon School	Eton College	Not awarded
Men J15 2x	Claires Court School		
Men J15 4x	Windsor Boys' School		
Men J14 1x	Durham		
Men J14 2x	Pangbourne College		
Men J14 4x	Windsor Boys' School		
Women 1x	Henley		
Women 2x	Lancaster / Queen Elizabeth HS		
Women 2-	St Paul's Girls' School		
Women 4+	St Leonard's School		
Women 8+	Worcester / King's School Worcester		
Women J16 1x	NCRA		
Women J16 2x	Durham		
Women J16 4+	St Leonard's School		
Women J16 4x	Henley		
Women J16 8+	Athena Ladies		
Women J15 2x	Warrington		
Women J15 4x	Henley		
Women J14 1x	Kingston		
Women J14 2x	Queen Elizabeth HS		
Women J14 4x	Henley		

== Coastal ==
=== Medal summary ===
Event	Gold	Silver	Bronze
Men 1x	Dover		
Men 2-	Christchurch		
Men 4+	Deal, Walmer & Kingsdown		
Women 4+	Christchurch		
Men J1x-	Dover		
Men J2-	Southsea		
Men J4+	Vosper		

Key

Symbol	meaning
1, 2, 4, 8	crew size
+	coxed
-	coxless
x	sculls
14	Under-14
15	Under-15
16	Under-16
J	Junior
