= Princess Elizabeth Challenge Cup =

Event at the Henley Royal Regatta

- Venue: Henley Royal Regatta, River Thames
- Location: Henley-on-Thames, Oxfordshire
- Dates: 1946 – present

The Princess Elizabeth Challenge Cup is a rowing event at Henley Royal Regatta open to school 1st VIIIs.

== History ==
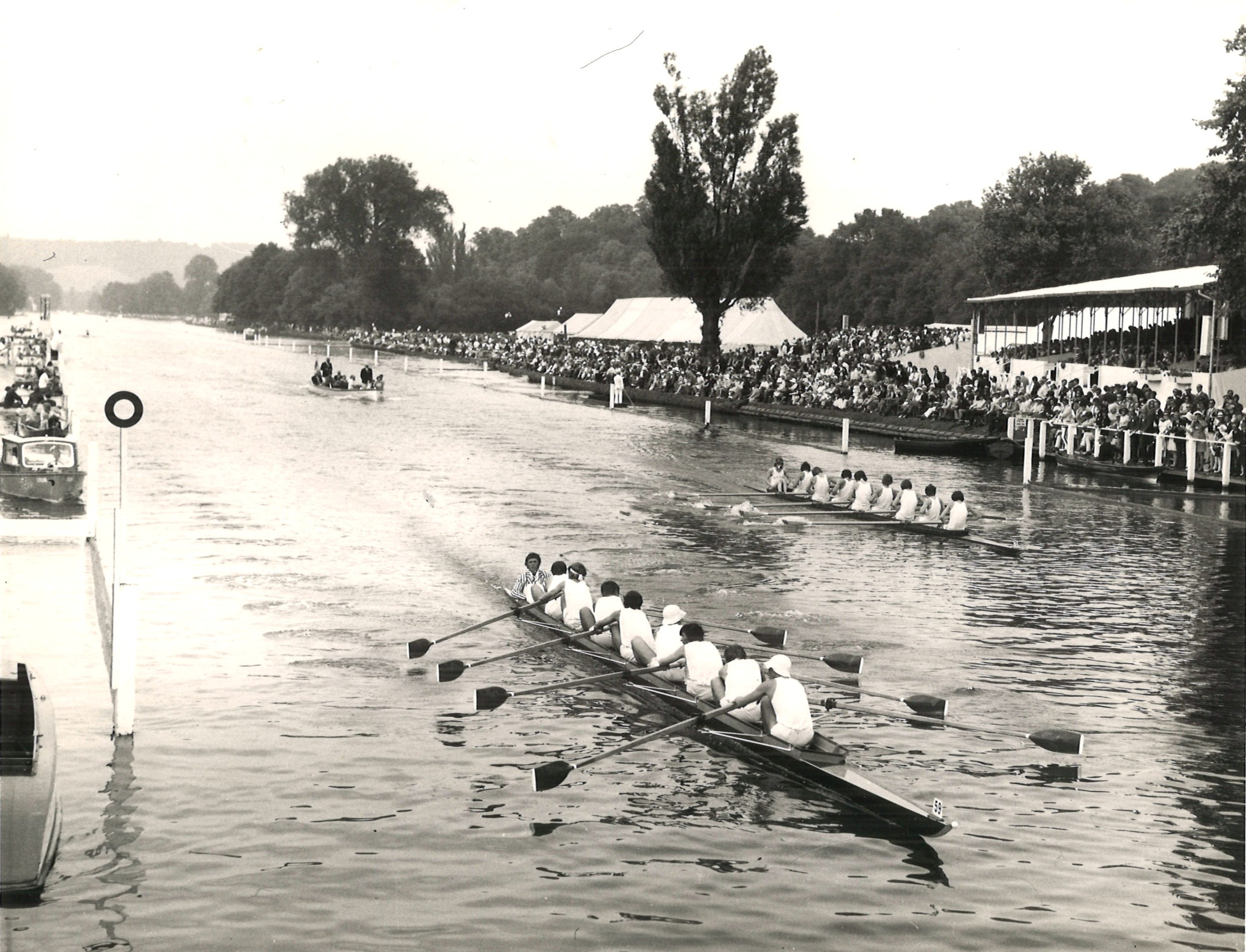
1971 Abingdon School defeats King's School Chester in the rounds

The event was instituted in 1946 for public schools in the United Kingdom. It was opened to entries from overseas in 1964, and that year Washington-Lee High School (United States) became the first overseas crew to win the event, beating Groton School, USA, in an all-American final.

The inauguration of this race coincided with future queen Princess Elizabeth's first visit to the regatta, and so permission was given to name the trophy "The Princess Elizabeth Challenge Cup".

The PE (as it is usually abbreviated) is one of only a few races in the regatta which does not allow composite crews to be entered, and as such each race is a straight competition between one club and another. As the most prestigious race of the school rowing year, the event attracts strong competition both from the UK and abroad. For British crews, winning the PE can be the final victory needed to win “the triple", a prestigious achievement which comprises winning the Schools' Head of the River Race, The National Schools Regatta and finally the Princess Elizabeth Challenge Cup, all in the same year. The "triple" was first achieved in 1978 by Eton College who have subsequently achieved it a further six times (1990, 1991, 1995, 2005, 2009 and 2010). Other winners of the triple are St. Edward's School in 1984, Hampton School in 1985, 1986 and 1988, Abingdon School in 2002 and 2012, and St Paul's School (London) in 2018 and 2024. Both St Pauls and Eton have also achieved a so-called "quadruple" by additionally winning the Youth Eights at the Head of the Charles Regatta; Eton in both 2008/09 and 2009/10 and St Paul's in 2017/18 and 2023/24.

Of British entries, Eton College have won the PE a total of 15 times, St Paul's School (London) 9 times, St. Edward's School 5 times, and Abingdon School, Bedford School, Hampton School, Pangbourne College and Shrewsbury School have each won the event 4 times.

Radley College are the most frequent losing finalists having done so on 8 occasions, followed by Eton College and St Paul's School on 6 occasions. Hampton School and St. Edward's School have been the losing finalists on 4 occasions. Westminster School, The King's School Canterbury and Oundle School share the record for the most losses (4) in finals without having ever won the event.

The PE was opened to international crews in 1964, since when American crews have won the event 14 times (and been losing finalists 19 times), Canadian crews 7 times (losing finalists 3 times), and Australian crews 3 times (losing finalists twice). Ridley College (Canada) remain the most successful North American school in the event having won the PE 5 times in the 1970's. Holy Spirit High School, USA and St.Paul's School, Concord, USA have both won the event 3 times, St.Paul's School, Concord, USA also having been losing finalists on 4 occasions. The Australian school to have won the event most recently was Scotch College, Melbourne in 2017.

At the 2023 regatta, the rules for the PE were changed to allow junior crews from clubs as well as schools to enter the event.

== Past winners ==
Year	Winner	Runner-Up	ref
1946	Bedford School	Radley College	
1947	Bedford School	Shrewsbury School	
1948	Bedford School	Radley College	
1949	Winchester College	Westminster School	
1950	St Paul's School (London)	Bedford School	
1951	Bedford School	Radley College	
1952	Radley College	Monkton Combe School	
1953	St Paul's School (London)	The King's School Canterbury	
1954	Winchester College	Oundle School	
1955	Shrewsbury School	Oundle School	
1956	Eton College	St Paul's School (London)	
1957	St Paul's School (London)	Shrewsbury School	
1958	St. Edward's School	Oundle School	
1959	St. Edward's School	Oundle School	
1960	Shrewsbury School	The King's School Canterbury	
1961	Shrewsbury School	The King's School Canterbury	
1962	Radley College	Nautical College, Pangbourne	
1963	Nautical College, Pangbourne	St Paul's School (London)	
1964	Washington-Lee High School, USA	Groton School, USA	
1965	Tabor Academy, USA	Phillips Exeter Academy, USA	
1966	Emanuel School	Halcyon Boat Club, St.Paul's School, USA	
1967	Eton College	Tabor Academy, USA	
1968	JEB Stuart High School, USA	Eton College	
1969	Washington-Lee High School, USA	Emanuel School	
1970	Ridley College, Canada	Hampton Grammar School	
1971	Pangbourne College	St. Andrew's School, USA	
1972	Kent School, USA	Brentwood College School, CAN	
1973	Ridley College, Canada	St. Paul's School, USA	
1974	Holy Spirit High School, Absecon, New Jersey, USA	Kingston Grammar School	
1975	Ridley College, Canada	St. Paul's School, USA	
1976	Holy Spirit High School, USA	Emanuel School	
1977	Ridley College, Canada	Hampton School	
1978	Eton College	Brentwood College School, CAN	
1979	Ridley College, Canada	Eton College	
1980	St. Paul's School (Concord, New Hampshire), USA	St. Joseph's Preparatory School, USA	
1981	Holy Spirit High School, USA	Emanuel School	
1982	Eton College	Holy Spirit High School. USA	
1983	Eton College	St. Andrew's School, USA	
1984	St. Edward's School	St. Joseph's Preparatory School, USA	
1985	Hampton School	St. Paul's School, USA	
1986	Hampton School	Belmont Hill School, USA	
1987	Belmont Hill School, USA	Hampton School	
1988	Hampton School	Eton College	
1989	Hampton School	Shiplake College	
1990	Eton College	Westminster School	
1991	Eton College	The King's School Canterbury	
1992	Pangbourne College	Westminster School	
1993	Brisbane Boys' College, AUS	Eton College	
1994	St. Paul's School (Concord, New Hampshire), USA	Atlantic City High School, USA	
1995	Eton College	Hampton School	
1996	Brentwood College School, CAN	St. Edward's School	
1997	St Paul's School (London)	Canford School	
1998	Radley College	St. Mary's Preparatory School, USA	
1999	St. Edward's School	St. Peter's College, AUS	
2000	Saint Joseph's Preparatory, USA	Groton School, USA	
2001	The King's School, Parramatta, Australia	Radley College	
2002	Abingdon School	St Paul's School (London)	
2003	Pangbourne College	St. Edward's School	
2004	St. Paul's School (Concord, New Hampshire), USA	Abingdon School	
2005	Eton College	Saint Joseph's Preparatory, USA	
2006	St. Ignatius College Preparatory, USA	The King's School Chester	
2007	Shrewsbury School	Brentwood College School, CAN	
2008	Shawnigan Lake School, Canada	Eton College	
2009	Eton College	Abingdon School	
2010	Eton College	Kent School, USA	
2011	Abingdon School	St. Andrew's School, Delaware, USA	
2012	Abingdon School	Radley College	
2013	Abingdon School	St. Edward's School	
2014	Eton College	St. Edward's School	
2015	St Paul's School (London)	Westminster School	
2016	Eton College	St Paul's School (London)	
2017	Scotch College, Melbourne, Australia	Radley College	
2018	St Paul's School (London)	Eton College	
2019	Eton College	Scotch College, Melbourne, AUS	
2020	No competition due to COVID-19 pandemic		
2021	Eton College	St Paul's School (London)	
2022	St Paul's School (London)	Radley College	
2023	St Edward's School	St Paul's School (London)	
2024	St Paul's School (London)	Shiplake College	
2025	Shiplake College	Radley College	
2026	St Paul's School (London)	St Edward's School	

== Record times ==
The record holder for the event is St Paul's School (London), having finished the course in 6 minutes 06 seconds in the final against Eton College in 2018. They beat the previous record for the event by 11 seconds, held by Abingdon School.

The course record times for the event are:

- 1:46 to the Barrier (St. Paul's School 2018)
- 2:58 to Fawley (St. Paul's School 2018)
- 6:06 to the Finish (St. Paul's School 2018)

== Sources ==
- Henley Royal Regatta
- Henley finals results 1946 onwards
