= 1999 British Rowing Championships =

- Venue: National Water Sports Centre
- Location: Holme Pierrepont (Nottingham)
- Dates: 16–18 July 1999

The 1999 British Rowing Championships known as the National Championships at the time, were the 28th edition of the National Championships, held from 16–18 July 1999 at the National Water Sports Centre in Holme Pierrepont, Nottingham. They were organised and sanctioned by British Rowing, and are open to British crews. A record 748 crews and 2,159 competitors took part in the Championships.

== Senior ==
=== Medal summary ===
Event	Gold	Silver	Bronze
Men 1x	Queen's Tower; László Szögi	Leander; Richard Briscoe	Isis
Men 2-	Thames Tradesmen's	Leander	London University
Men 2x	Auriol Kensington / Queen's Tower	Castle Semple / Glasgow	Royal Chester
Men 4-	Oxford Brookes University	Abingdon / Bedford / Hampton School / Monkton	Molesey
Men 4x	Thames	Walton	G.B. national squad
Men 4+	NCRA	Abingdon / Queen Elizabeth HS / Westminster School/ Kingston / Hampton School	Oxford Brookes University
Men 8+	Castle Semple	Molesey	London University
Women 1x	Clydesdale; Alison Watt	Thames; Gita Barz	St Andrew; Alison Hulme
Women 2x	Thames	Walbrook & Royal Canoe	Henley / Wycliffe College
Women 2-	Queen's Tower	Worcester	St Peter's School / London University
Women 4x	Thames Tradesmen's	Burway / Henley / Queens Park	Thames / London University
Women 4-	Kingston / Gloucester / Headington School / Lady Eleanor Holles School	Gloucester / Lady Eleanor Holles School / Oundle	Marlow
Women 4+	Kingston / Gloucester / Headington School / Lady Eleanor Holles School	Marlow / Molesey	Newark
Women 8+	Marlow / Molesey/NCRA / Star Club / Tideway Scullers School	Kingston / Molesey / Twickenham / Upper Thames	Marlow / Molesey / Queens Park HS

== Lightweight ==
=== Medal summary ===
Event	Gold	Silver	Bronze
Men L1x	Tideway Scullers School	Leander	Holme Pierrepont
Men L2x	Marlow / Stourport	Marlow / Wycliffe College	Leander
Men L2-	NCRA	Nottingham	Weybridge
Men L4-	London	Staines	Clyde
Men L4x	Exeter University / Marlow / Stourport	St George's College / Walton	Upper Thames
Women L1x	Clydesdale	Star Club	Queen's Tower
Women L2x	Rebecca	Star Club	Avon County
Women L2-	Marlow	Tideway Scullers School	Lady Eleanor Holles School
Women L4x	Thames Tradesmen's	Upper Thames / Wallingford	Edinburgh University / St Andrew
Women L4-	Avon County / Globe / Upper Thames	Nottingham	Edinburgh University / Glasgow / St Andrew

== U 23 ==
=== Medal summary ===
Event	Gold	Silver	Bronze
Men 1x	Durham	Nottingham & Union	Exeter

== Coastal ==
=== Medal summary ===
Event	Gold	Silver	Bronze
Men 1x	Liverpool John Moores	Lymington	Southsea
Men 2-	Lymington	Southsea	Poole
Men 4+	Southampton Coalporters	Ryde B	Ryde A

== Junior ==
=== Medal summary ===
Event	Gold	Silver	Bronze
Men 1x	Thames Tradesmen's	Burway A	Burway B
Men 2-	Hampton	George Heriot's School	Nithsdale
Men 2x	Peterborough City / Star Club	Windsor Boys' School	St George's College / Walton
Men 4-	Hampton	Bewdley	Bedford School
Men 4x	Tiffin School	King's College School	Henley / Marlow / Sir William Borlase
Men 4+	Aberdeen Schools	Nithsdale	Bedford School
Men J16 1x	Northwich	Aberdeen Schools	George Watson's
Men J16 2x	Icena	Maidstone Invicta / Sudbury	King's School Rochester
Men J16 4-	Bedford School	Eton College	Bedford Modern School
Men J16 4+	Hampton	Lancaster Royal GS	Bedford School
Men J16 4x	Tiffin School	Wycliffe College	Maidenhead
Men J15 1x	Sudbury	Nithsdale	Tideway Scullers School
Men J15 2x	St Leonard's School	Henley	Thames
Men J15 4x+	Burton Leander	Windsor Boys' School	Thames
Men J14 1x	Tideway Scullers School	Westminster School	Bewdley
Men J14 2x	Star Club	Winchester College	St Leonard's School
Women 1x	Wycliffe College	Durham	Warwick
Women 2-	Aberdeen Schools	Oundle School	Gloucester
Women 2x	George Watson's	Queen Elizabeth HS	Headington School / Kingston
Women 4+	Aberdeen Schools	Haberdasher's Monmouth Girls	George Heriot's School
Women J16 1x	Headington School	NCRA	St Peter's School
Women J16 2x	Headington School	Northwich	Gloucester
Women J16 4+	Haberdasher's Monmouth Girls	Lady Eleanor Holles School	George Heriot's School
Women J16 4x	Henley	Headington School	Star Club
Women J15 1x	Queens Park High School	Stratford-upon-Avon	Evesham
Women J15 2x	Headington School	Sir William Borlase	Henley
Women J15 4x+	Northwich	Henley	St Leonard's School
Women J14 1x	Lady Eleanor Holles School	Gloucester	Hereford Cathedral School
Women J14 2x	Headington School	Burway	Grange School
Women J14 4x+	Headington School A	Northwich	Headington School B

Key

Symbol	meaning
1, 2, 4, 8	crew size
+	coxed
-	coxless
x	sculls
14	Under-14
15	Under-15
16	Under-16
J	Junior
