= 1989 British Rowing Championships =

- Venue: Strathclyde Country Park
- Location: Motherwell, North Lanarkshire
- Dates: 14–16 July 1989

The 1989 National Rowing Championships was the 18th edition of the National Championships, held from 14–16 July 1989 at the Strathclyde Country Park in Motherwell, North Lanarkshire.

== Senior ==
=== Medal summary ===
Event	Gold	Silver	Bronze
Men 1x	NCRA; Simon Larkin	Thames Tradesmen; Mark Pollecutt	Thames; Gavin Reddin
Men 2+	Kingston	Thames Tradesmen	Tideway Scullers School
Men 2x	Barclays Bank / Tideway Scullers School	NCRA	Tideway Scullers School
Men 2-	NCRA	Tideway Scullers School	Lea
Men 4-	NCRA	Thames Tradesmen	Upper Thames
Men 4+	Thames Tradesmen	Lea	Edinburgh University
Men 4x	NCRA	Tideway Scullers School B	Tideway Scullers School A
Men 8+	Castle Semple / Clydesdale / Stirling	Tideway Scullers School	Lea
Women 1x	Tideway Scullers School; Cathy Baker	Thames Tradesmen; Debbie Flewin	Birmingham University; Helen Bruce
Women 2x	GB National Lightweight squad Helen Mangan & Claire Parker	Thames	Tideway Scullers School
Women 2-	Thames	GB National squad	Clydesdale
Women 4+	GB National Lightweight squad Sue Key, Rachel Hirst, Joanna Toch, Katie Brownlow	Kingston	Kingston
Women 4x	Kingston	GB National squad	Clydesdale / Glasgow
Women 8+	Thames	Cambridge University	Tideway Scullers School / London University

== Lightweight ==
=== Medal summary ===
Event	Gold	Silver	Bronze
Men 1x	Thames Tradesmen	St Ives	Queens Tower
Men 2x	Leander	London A	London B
Men 4-	NCRA	Thames Tradesmen	Henley
Men 4x	Goldie / Lea / Rob Roy	Thames Tradesmen / Tideway Scullers School / London University	Upper Thames
Men 8+	Cambridge University	Clydesdale	Thames Tradesmen
Women 1x	Tideway Scullers School	Staines	Birmingham
Women 2x	GB National squad	Putney Town / Sons of the Thames	Nottingham & Union
Women 4-	GB National squad	Lea / Thames Tradesmen	Kingston

== Junior ==
=== Medal summary ===
Event	Gold	Silver	Bronze
Men 1x	GB national junior squad		
Men 2-	GB national junior squad		
Men 2x	Bryanston School		
Men 2+	Carmel College		
Men 4-	City of Cambridge		
Men 4+	Royal Chester		
Men 4x	Kingston Grammar School / Westminster School		
Men 8+	Eton College / Windsor Boys' School		
Men J16 1x	Barn Elms Centre		
Men J16 2-	Windsor Boys' School		
Men J16 2x	Worcester / Wycliffe College		
Men J16 2+	Barn Elms Centre		
Men J16 4+	Westminster School		
Men J16 4-	Royal Shrewsbury School		
Men J16 4x	Marlow / Wallingford		
Men J16 8+	Cheltenham College		
Men J14 1x	St Neots		
Men J14 2x	City of London School / Barn Elms Centre		
Men J14 4x	King's School Chester		
Women 1x	St Neots		
Women 2x	GB national junior squad		
Women 2-	GB national junior squad		
Women 4x	GB national junior squad		
Women 4+	GB national junior squad		
Women 8+	Composite		
Women J16 1x	GB national junior squad		
Women J16 2x	Wallingford		
Women J16 4+	George Watson's College		
Women J16 4x	Lady Eleanor Holles School / Lea / Molesey		
Women J16 8+	George Watson's College		
Women J14 1x	Marlow		
Women J14 2x	Kingston Grammar School		
Women J14 4x	Trent		

== Coastal ==
=== Medal summary ===
Event	Gold	Silver	Bronze
Men 1x	Southsea A	Southsea B	BTC Southampton
Men 2-	Dover	Southsea A	Southsea B
Men 4+	Christchurch	Southsea	Ryde
Men J1x-	Southsea		
Men J2-	Christchurch		
Men J4+	Christchurch		

Key

Symbol	meaning
1, 2, 4, 8	crew size
+	coxed
-	coxless
x	sculls
14	Under-14
15	Under-15
16	Under-16
J	Junior
