= 1983 British Rowing Championships =

Rowing event

- Venue: National Water Sports Centre
- Location: Holme Pierrepont (Nottingham)
- Dates: 16–17 July 1983

The 1983 National Rowing Championships was the 12th edition of the National Championships, held from 16–17 July 1983 at the National Water Sports Centre in Holme Pierrepont, Nottingham.

== Senior ==
=== Medal summary ===
Event	Gold	Silver	Bronze
Men 1x	Marlow; Steve Redgrave	Kingston; Tim Crooks	Thames; Tony Ross
Men 2+	London University	Kingston / London University	Nottingham Britannia
Men 2x	Tideway Scullers School	London	Poplar
Men 2-	Tyrian; Mostyn Field & G Hill	NCRA; Allan Whitwell & Martin Knight	Lea; Julian Scrivener & Salih Hassan
Men 4-	A.R.A Squad	London University	Imperial College / Maidenhead
Men 4+	A.R.A Squad	Kingston	Lea
Men 4x	Maidenhead	Lea	Kingston
Men 8+	Kingston / Oxford University / London University; Graham Jones	A.R.A Squad	Imperial College / Staines
Whitbread Sprint	Molesey	Thames Tradesmen's	Agecroft; Nigel Weare (cox)
Women 1x	Thames Tradesmen; Beryl Mitchell	Lea; Jean Genchi	Cambridge University; Nonie Ray
Women 2x	Kingston / Staines; Sandy Lutz & Pauline Hart	A.R.A Squad; Mary Wilson & Belinda Holmes	
Women 2-	Thames Tradesmen's / Tideway Scullers School; Lin Clark & Gill Hodges		
Women 4+	A.R.A Squad; Tessa Millar, Kareen Marwick, Kate McNicol, Katie Ball, Sue Bailey (cox)	Durham University	Composite; Gwynne Betty, Jane Cross, Melanie Holmes, Gill Parker, C Grant (cox)
Women 4x	Notts / Reading / Upper Thames; Bev Jones, Belinda Holmes, Mary Wilson, Alexa Forbes, C Grant (cox)		
Women 8+	A.R.A Squad	London University	A.R.A Junior Squad

== Lightweight ==
=== Medal summary ===
Event	Gold	Silver	Bronze
Men 1x	London John Melvin	London Rowing Club Stephen Chilmaid	
Men 2x	Thames Tradesmen / Wallingford RC		
Men 4-	NCRA	London Rowing Club. [LRC]	Thames Tradesmen RC [TTRC]
Men 8+	ARA Squad		

== Junior ==
=== Medal summary ===
Event	Gold	Silver	Bronze
Men 1x	Poplar		
Men 2-	Hereford / Hereford Cathedral		
Men 2x	Marlow / Windsor Boys' School		
Men 2+	St Edward's School		
Men 4-	ARA Squad		
Men 4+	ARA Squad		
Men 4x	ARA Squad		
Men 8+	ARA Squad		
Men J16 1x	Liverpool Victoria		
Men J16 2-	Kingston Grammar School		
Men J16 2x	Hollingworth Lake		
Men J16 2+	Pangbourne College		
Men J16 4+	St Paul's School		
Men J16 4-	Kingston Grammar School		
Men J16 8+	St Paul's School		
Men J14 4x	Kingston Grammar School		
Women 1x	Great Marlow School		
Women 2x	Nottingham		
Women 2-	Abingdon / Strode's College; Sue Clark, Samantha Wensley		
Women 4+	Queen Elizabeth HS		
Women 8+	Composite		

== Coastal ==
=== Medal summary ===
Event	Gold	Silver	Bronze
Men 4+	Christchurch		
Women 4+	Worthing		

Key

Symbol	meaning
1, 2, 4, 8	crew size
+	coxed
-	coxless
x	sculls
14	Under-14
15	Under-15
16	Under-16
J	Junior
