= Schools' Head of the River Race =

Annual rowing race in River Thames, England

- Frequency: Annual
- Locations: Championship Course, River Thames in London, England
- Years active: 1946 – present
- Previous event: 20 March 2024
- Next event: 21 March 2025
- Participants: approx. 300 crews
- Organiser: Westminster School
- Website: www.shorr.org.uk

The Schools' Head of the River Race (SHORR) is the UK's largest school-age processional (head rowing) race and is organised by Westminster School for crews aged between 14 and 18 years old. It is held in Spring, the end of the head race season.

The race forms a leg of the national kudos of winning a rowing 'triple' in which occasionally an undefeated Junior Eight (J18 8+ or WJ18 8+) wins this race, the National Schools Regatta, and either the Princess Elizabeth Challenge Cup at Henley Royal Regatta or the Peabody Cup at Henley Women's Regatta.

== Course ==
The race is held annually on the River Thames in London, England, on a course from Chiswick Bridge in Mortlake to Westminster School Boat Club flagpole in Putney. It is rowed with the tide and is in the opposite direction to The Boat Race.

== Race format ==
=== History ===
When the race was first held in 1946 the course was shorter than at present, from above Hammersmith Bridge to the current finishing post, a distance of approximately 1.75 miles. The course was lengthened in 1988 with a start from Duke's Meadow, a mile further upstream, and again in 2000 when the start was moved to Chiswick Bridge, resulting in a course almost the length of the full Boat Race.

After the course was lengthened, the Schools' Head continued to offer a shorter course (from London Corinthian Sailing Club above Hammersmith Bridge) for smaller boats, such as J15 4s, J15 B 8's, and Maiden 4s; however, in 2009 this was changed by E. Li, the event's manager.

Eton College have won the race a total of 14 times, followed by Emanuel School with 11 wins (including a remarkable eight in nine years from 1962-1970), St Paul's with 10 and Hampton School with 9. In addition to these, the headship in 2000 was shared in an unprecedented three-way tie between Hampton, St Paul's and Canford School. In the Junior Women's category, Lady Eleanor Holles School has the most wins with 12.

Bad weather has occasionally disrupted the race. Indeed, in its very first year almost half the starting crews capsized due to the adverse conditions. The race was cancelled in 2001 due to dangerous conditions, reduced to its original length in 2008 as a result of strong winds disrupting the marshalling area and even more severely shortened in 2017, retaining the usual start line but finishing at the bandstand shortly after Barnes bridge.

In addition, in 2020 the race was cancelled due to the COVID-19 pandemic and the restrictions on 'non-essential' contact and in 2021, as a result of the ongoing pandemic, a 'virtual' Schools' Head event was run with crews submitting GPS recordings on their home stretches of water.

=== Current format ===
The race was initially a smaller event for Championship men's crews, with only 14 competing in its first year. However, numbers have grown significantly over time and additional categories of boats have been added. For example, in 2012, the J4- and WJ4- events were introduced (Note: In line with increased rationalisation globally to coxless fours see for example the 2006 abolition of the Prince Philip Challenge Cup and expansion of the Britannia Challenge Cup with the Prince Albert Challenge Cup for university student coxed fours at Henley.) and in 2013 the Mix 4x (Note: Quad. Ch, only used in the 8s category, denotes top boat (Championship entry for each school) for other symbols used (+ and -) see Rowing (sport)) event was introduced to the race.

Women's events were first included in 1982. Although participation was relatively limited at first, with only eight 4s in the first year and no 8s until 1983, the number of entrants has grown substantially over time as a result of the increased popularity of schoolgirl rowing, with over 125 women's crews competing in 2023.

The race is now the largest head race of the winter season by junior crews attracting around 300 crews each year. Composite crews, drawn from more than one club or school, are not permitted. All categories race the same course.

== Records ==
The current record holders for the events are:

=== Men's events ===
Event	Winner	Time	Year
Ch8+	St Paul's School	16:24.0	2024
1st8+	Norwich School	17:11.3	2024
2nd8+	Eton College	16:58.2	2024
3rd8+	St Paul's School	17:30.5	2024
J16 Ch8+	St Paul's School	17:13.5	2024
J16 1st8+	Sir William Borlase	17:53	2011
J16 2nd8+	St Paul's School	18:24	2026
J15 Ch8+	Aberdeen Schools RA	17:54	2018
J15 1st8+	St George's College	18:12	2011
J15 2nd8+	St Paul's School	18:37	2012
J15 3rd8+	St Paul's School	19:50	2026
Ch4x	Maidenhead Rowing Club	17:19.5	2018
J4-	Westminster School	18:41	2012
J4+	Molesey Boat Club	18:26.9	2018
J16 4x	Henley RC	18:14	2018
J16 4+	Evesham Rowing Club	19:17	2011
J15 4+	Westminster School	19:38	2012

=== Women's events ===
Event	Winner	Time	Year
WJ Ch8+	Headington School	18:09.5	2024
WJ 1st8+	Godolphin and Latymer School	18:44.7	2024
WJ 2nd8+	Henley RC	18:34.5	2024
WJ 3rd8+	Headington School	19:37.0	2024
WJ16 Ch8+	Latymer Upper School	18:52.7	2024
WJ16 1st8+	St Paul's Girls	19:09.6	2024
WJ16 2nd8+	Headington School	19:24.8	2024
WJ15 Ch8+	Latymer Upper School	19:33	2018
WJ15 1st8+	Sir William Perkins's School	20:30	2022
WJ15 2nd8+	Surbiton High School	21:11	2022
WJ 4x	Wycliffe College	18:15.4	2024
WJ 4-	Sir William Borlase	20:37	2012
WJ 4+	Henley Rowing Club	20:12	2007
WJ16 4x	Shiplake College	19:15	2022
WJ16 4+	Kingston RC	20:31	2018

=== Mixed events ===
Event	Winner	Time	Year
Mix 8+	Kingston Grammar School	18:34.3	2024
Mix 4x	York City RC	18:56	2018

== Winners of all categories when last held ==
Event	Winner	Time
Ch 8+	St Paul's School	16:24.0
1st 8+	Norwich School	17:11.3
2nd 8+	Eton College	16:58.2
3rd 8+	St Paul's School	17:30.5
J16 Ch8+	St Paul's School	17:13.5
J16 1st8+	St George's College	18:19.4
J16 2nd8+	[[[St Paul's School Boat Club|St Paul's School]]	18:05.4
J15 Ch8+	St Paul's School (Note: Not competed in 2024 due to bad weather)	18:31.5
J15 1st8+	Bedford School (Note: Not competed in 2024 due to bad weather)	19:16.1
J15 2nd8+	St Paul's School (Note: Not competed in 2024 due to bad weather)	19:00.3
W Ch8+	Headington School	18:09.5
W 1st8+	Godolphin and Latymer School	18:44.7
W 2nd8+	Henley Rowing Club	18:34.5
W 3rd8+	Headington School	19:37.0
WJ16 Ch8+	Latymer Upper School	18:52.7
WJ16 1st8+	St Paul's Girls	19:09.6
WJ16 2nd8+	Headington School	19:24.8
WJ15 Ch8+	Henley Rowing Club (Note: Not competed in 2024 due to bad weather)	20:22.4
WJ15 1st8+	Putney High School (Note: Not competed in 2024 due to bad weather)	20:59.3
WJ15 2nd8+	Headington School (Note: Not competed in 2024 due to bad weather)	21:17.4
Ch 4x-	Tideway Scullers School	17:11.3
W Ch 4x-	Wycliffe College	18.15.4
Mix 8+	Kingston Grammar School	18:34.3
Mix 4x-	Hinksey Sculling School (Note: Last held in 2022)	19:19.0

== Previous J18 eights winners ==
Year	Time	Winner	Second	Third
2025	16:33.0	St Paul's School	Shiplake College	Eton College
2024	16:24.0	St Paul's School	Shiplake College	King's College School
2023	16:47.9	Shiplake College	Radley College	St Paul's School
2022	16:54.4	Shiplake College	Eton College	St Edward's School
2021	Cancelled (Note: Replaced with a 'virtual' Schools' Head event with crews submitting GPS recordings on their home stretches of water)			
2020	Cancelled			
2019	16:36.6 (Note: New Record.)	Shiplake College	Eton College	St Paul's School
2018	16:40.6	St Paul's School	Shiplake College	Eton College
2017	4:50 (Note: Shortened course.)	Shiplake College	Eton College	St Paul's School
2016	17:38	Westminster School	Shiplake College	St Paul's School
2015	17:58	Westminster School	St Paul's School	Eton College
2014	16:56	St Paul's School	St Edward's School	Radley College
2013	17:10	Hampton School	Abingdon School	St Paul's School
2012	16:53	Abingdon School	Hampton School	Shrewsbury School
2011	16:53	Abingdon School	Eton College	Shrewsbury School
2010	17:22	Eton College	Shrewsbury School	Hampton School
2009	16:47	Eton College	Shrewsbury School	St Paul's School
2008	9:39 (Note: Shortened course.)	Shrewsbury School	Abingdon School	Eton College
2007	17:06	Shrewsbury School	Radley College	Abingdon School
2006	17:13	Shrewsbury School	Abingdon School	St Paul's School
2005	17:24	Eton College	Shrewsbury School	Abingdon School
2004	17:15	Hampton School	Abingdon School	St Paul's School
2003	18:41	St Paul's School	Pangbourne College	Abingdon School
2002	17:20	Abingdon School	St Paul's School	Hampton School
2001	Cancelled			
2000	17:06	Three-way tie between Hampton School , St Paul's School & Canford School		
1999	12:53	Hampton School	Abingdon School	St Paul's School
1998	12:34	St Edward's School	Abingdon School	Hampton School
1997	12:59	St Edward's School	St Paul's School	Hampton School
1996	13:19	St Paul's School	Eton College	Kingston Grammar School
1995	12:42	Eton College	Hampton School	St Paul's School
1994	13:03	Kingston Grammar School	Eton College (A)	Eton College (B)
1993	12:50	Kingston Grammar School	Eton College	Shrewsbury School
1992	12:48	Eton College	Hampton School & Shrewsbury School	
1991	12:53	Eton College	Shrewsbury School	Pangbourne College
1990	12:48	Eton College	Hampton School & Westminster School	
1989	12:35	Hampton School	Eton College	Emanuel School
1988	12:44	Hampton School	Emanuel School	Shrewsbury School
1987	7:39	Hampton School	Emanuel School	St Edward's School
1986	7:54	Hampton School	Shrewsbury School	St Edward's School
1985	7:41	Hampton School	Eton College	Shrewsbury School
1984	7:38	St Edward's School	Shrewsbury School	Shiplake College
1983	7:50	St Edward's School (Note: Hampton were initially announced winners but were demoted four places upon review)	Shrewsbury School	Eton College
1982	8:03	Shrewsbury School	Emanuel School	Hampton School
1981	7:20	Emanuel School	Shrewsbury School	St Edward's School
1980	7:29	Shrewsbury School	St Edward's School	Westminster School
1979	8:16	Eton College	St Edward's School	Winchester College
1978	7:57	Eton College	Shrewsbury School	Latymer Upper School
1977	8:05	Hampton School	Shrewsbury School	St Edward's School
1976	8:57	Emanuel School	Hampton School	Canford School
1975	7:41	Emanuel School	Eton College	Canford School
1974	7:41	Eton College	Westminster School	Kingston Grammar School
1973	7:49	Eton College (A)	Eton College (B)	Westminster School
1972	7:29	Eton College	Emanuel School	Hampton School
1971	7:54	Westminster School	Hampton School	Eton College
1970	7:57	Emanuel School	Hampton School	Eton College
1969	7:48	Emanuel School	Eton College	Kingston Grammar School
1968	7:51	Emanuel School	Ealing Grammar School	Winchester College
1967	7:51	Emanuel School	St Paul's School	Hampton School
1966	7:44	Emanuel School	Winchester College	Eton College
1965	8:00	Emanuel School	Eton College	Tiffin School
1964	7:48	King's School Canterbury	Hampton School	St Edward's School
1963	7:33	Emanuel School	St Paul's School	King's School Canterbury
1962	8:15	Emanuel School	King's School Canterbury	Hampton School
1961	7:48	King's School Canterbury	Hampton School	St Edward's School
1960	8:29	King's School Canterbury	Bedford School	Bryanston School
1959	7:31	Eton College	St Edward's School	Haberdashers' School
1958	(Note: Not reported)	Winchester College	Bryanston School & St Edward's School	
1957	7:28	St Paul's School	Bryanston School	Winchester College
1956	(Note: Not reported)	St Paul's School	Emanuel School	St Edward's School
1955	8:05	Eton College	St Paul's School	St Edward's School
1954	7:52	Winchester College	Eton College	St Edward's School
1953	7:51	Winchester College	Eton College & Radley College	
1952	7:52	Bryanston School	Winchester College	Eton College
1951	7:25	St Paul's School	Westminster School	Bryanston School
1950	7:51	St Paul's School	Latymer Upper School	Shrewsbury School
1949	7:53	Winchester College	Bryanston School	Westminster School
1947 (Note: Held in November of the 1947/48 school year)	8:47	Bryanston School	St Paul's School	Westminster School
1946 (Note: Held in November of the 1946/47 school year)	9:41	St Paul's School	Westminster School	Latymer Upper School

== Previous J18 Women eights winners ==
Year	Time	Winner
2025	18:29.6	Headington School
2024	18:09.5	Headington School
2023	18:45.8	Wycliffe Junior Rowing Club
2022	18:56.4	Henley RC
2021	Cancelled	
2020	Cancelled	
2019	18:44.2	Henley RC
2018	18:18.0	Henley RC
2017	5:25 (Note: Shortened course.)	Headington School
2016	19:28	Headington School
2015	19:43	Headington School
2014	18:49	Headington School
2013	19:17	Headington School
2012	19:02	Lady Eleanor Holles School
2011	18:28	Lady Eleanor Holles School
2010	19:52	Headington School
2009	18:56	Lady Eleanor Holles School
2008	10:56 (Note: Shortened course.)	Lady Eleanor Holles School
2007	18:51	Maidenhead Rowing Club
2006	19:37	Headington School
2005	19:32	Headington School
2004	19:27	Kingston Grammar School
2003	20:34	Kingston Grammar School
2002	19:11	Headington School
2001	Cancelled	
2000	19:11	Lady Eleanor Holles School
1999	14:27	Lady Eleanor Holles School
1998	14:09	Lady Eleanor Holles School
1997	14:48	Lady Eleanor Holles School
1996	15:02	Kingston Grammar School
1995	14:30	Kingston Grammar School
1994	14:42	Lady Eleanor Holles School
1993	14:36	Lady Eleanor Holles School
1992	14:29	Lady Eleanor Holles School
1991	14:47	Kingston Grammar School
1990	14:41	Kingston Grammar School
1989	15:16	George Heriot's School
1988	16:05	Monmouth Rowing Club
1987	9:10	King James's School
1986	(Note: Not reported)	Pilgrim's School
1985	9:57	Kingston Grammar School
1984	9:46	Lady Eleanor Holles School
1983	9:42	Monkton Combe School

== See also ==
- Rowing on the River Thames

== Notes and references ==
Notes
