= 2003 British Rowing Championships =

- Venue: Strathclyde Country Park
- Location: Motherwell, North Lanarkshire
- Dates: 18–20 July 2003

The 2003 British Rowing Championships known as the National Championships at the time, were the 32nd edition of the National Championships, held from 18–20 July 2003 at the Strathclyde Country Park in Motherwell, North Lanarkshire. They were organised and sanctioned by British Rowing, and are open to British rowers.

== Senior ==
=== Medal summary ===
Event	Gold	Silver	Bronze
Men 1x	Leander	Glasgow	Stirling
Men 2-	Nautilus	Cambridge University	Leander / Durham University
Men 2x	NCRA	Castle Semple	Durham University
Men 4-	Nautilus	Worcester	London
Men 4x	Nautilus	NCRA	Henley
Men 4+	Nottingham & Union	London	Nautilus
Men 8+	Nautilus	London / Nottingham & Union / Molesey / Leander	Worcester
Women 1x	Loughborough	London University	Reading
Women 2x	Nautilus	Dame Alice Harpur / George Watson's	Rob Roy
Women 2-	Kingston	Thames / Globe	Auriol Kensington
Women 4x	Marlow / Northwich / Lady Eleanor Holles School / Wycliffe College	Tideway Scullers School	Globe / London / Upper Thames
Women 4-	NCRA / Cambridge University / Durham / John O'Gaunt	Nautilus	St Neots / Burton Leander / Kingston Grammar School / King's School Worcester
Women 4+	London University / Tideway Scullers School / London	Tideway Scullers School	Furnivall SC
Women 8+	London University	Upper Thames / Globe / London	Thames

== Lightweight ==
=== Medal summary ===
Event	Gold	Silver	Bronze
Men L1x	Walton	London	Aberdeen University
Men L2x	Tideway Scullers School / Putney Town	Upper Thames	NCRA
Men L2-	Furnivall SC	NCRA	Nottingham & Union
Men L4-	Nottingham & Union	London	Aberdeen University
Men L4x	Tideway Scullers School	Rebecca	Nottingham & Union
Women L1x	Rob Roy	Peterborough	Walton
Women L2x	Upper Thames	NCRA	Marlow / Wallingford
Women L2-	Nottingham	Nottingham University	Furnivall SC
Women L4x	Clyde / Clydesdale	Eton Excelsior	Durham / Durham University / City of Sunderland
Women L4-	Grosvenor	Aberdeen University	Staines

== U 23 ==
=== Medal summary ===
Event	Gold	Silver	Bronze
Men 1x	George Watson's College	Burway	Marlow

== Junior ==
=== Medal summary ===
Event	Gold	Silver	Bronze
Men 1x	George Watson's College	Henley	Durham
Men 2-	Northwich	Aberdeen Schools	Nithsdale
Men 2x	NCRA	Durham	Windsor Boys' School
Men 4-	Aberdeen Schools	Canford School	Yarm School
Men 4x	Royal Chester	Dulwich College / Windsor Boys' School	Star Club
Men 4+	Aberdeen Schools	Nithsdale	Northwich
Men J16 1x	Burway	Burton Leander	Wycliffe College
Men J16 2-	RGS Worcester	St Leonard's School	Molesey
Men J16 2x	Upper Thames	St Neots	Northwich
Men J16 4+	Kingston Grammar School	Canford School	Monkton Bluefriars
Men J16 4x	King's School Worcester	Kingston Grammar School	Windsor Boys' School
Men J15 1x	St George's College	Queen Elizabeth HS	Windsor Boys' School
Men J15 2x	Newark	St Leonard's School	Dulwich College
Men J15 4x+	King's School Worcester	Tiffin	Windsor Boys' School
Men J14 1x	Walton	Yarm School	Glasgow
Men J14 2x	Tideway Scullers School	Durham	Upper Thames
Men J14 4x+	St Leonard's School	Yarm School	Henley
Women 1x	Hereford	Marlow	Molesey
Women 2-	St Leonard's School	Nithsdale	Aberdeen Schools
Women 2x	Avon County / Marlow	Tyne	Oundle School
Women 4-	George Heriot's School	Nithsdale	Haberdasher's Monmouth Girls
Women 4x	St Neots	Marlow / Avon County	Sir William Borlase
Women 4+	King's School Worcester	Aberdeen Schools	Nithsdale / George Heriot's School
Women 8+	St Paul's Girls' School / Molesey	Haberdasher's Monmouth Girls	Gloucester
Women J16 1x	Grange School	Wycliffe College	Tyne
Women J16 2x	Sir William Borlase	Henley	Queen Elizabeth HS
Women J16 4+	George Heriot's School	Gloucester	Haberdasher's Monmouth Girls
Women J15 1x	Reading	Nithsdale	Durham
Women J15 2x	Newark	Evesham	Worcester
Women J15 4x+	Thames Tradesmen's	Maidstone Invicta	King's School Worcester
Women J14 1x	Gloucester	Reading	Chester-le-Street
Women J14 2x	Maidstone Invicta	Talkin Tarn	Northwich
Women J14 4x+	St Leonard's School	Evesham	Royal Chester

Key

Symbol	meaning
1, 2, 4, 8	crew size
+	coxed
-	coxless
x	sculls
14	Under-14
15	Under-15
16	Under-16
J	Junior
