= 2021 British Rowing Junior Championships =

Rowing competition

- Venue: National Water Sports Centre
- Location: Holme Pierrepont (Nottingham)
- Dates: 16–18 July 2021

The 2021 British Rowing Junior Championships were the 49th edition of the National Junior Championships, held from 16–18 July 2021 at the National Water Sports Centre in Holme Pierrepont, Nottingham They are organised and sanctioned by British Rowing, and are open to British junior rowers.

== Winners ==
Event	Gold	Silver	Bronze
Open J18 1x	Bewl Bridge	Cambridge '99	Chester-le-Street
Open J18 2-	Reading Blue Coat	St Paul's	Walton
Open J18 2x	Exeter	NCRA	King's Ely
Open J18 4-	Westminster	Hinksey (A)	Hinksey (B)
Open J18 4x	Windsor Boys'	Tideway Scullers School	Leander Club
Open J18 8+	St Paul's	Shiplake College	Shrewsbury
Open J16 1x	Wallingford	Maidstone Invicta	Tyne
Open J16 2-	Westminster	Walton	Hinksey
Open J16 2x	St Andrew	Marlow	Weybridge
Open J16 4+	Hampton B	Hampton A	Mossbourne
Open J16 4x	Hereford Cathedral	Sir William Borlase	Marlow
Open J15 1x	NCRA	Chester-le-Street	Norwich
Open J15 2x	Marlow	Tideway Scullers School	Reading
Open J15 4x+	Windsor Boys'	Walton	Marlow
Open J14 4x+	not held		
Women J18 1x	Shiplake College	George Heriot's	Cambridge '99
Women J18 2-	King's Worcester	Aberdeen Schools	Marlow
Women J18 2x	Shiplake College	Lea	Cambridge '99
Women J18 4x	Shiplake College	Wycliffe	Wallingford
Women J18 4-	Marlow	Glasgow Academy	Kingston Grammar
Women J18 8+	Headington	Henley	Aberdeen Schools / Glasgow Academy / George Heriot's/ George Watson's
Women J16 1x	Wycliffe A	George Watson'ss	Wycliffe B
Women J16 2-	Weybridge	St Paul's Girls'	George Watson's
Women J16 2x	Gloucester	Hinksey	Trentham
Women J16 4+	Henley	Great Marlow	Weybridge
Women J16 4x	Kingston Grammar	Henley A	Henley B
Women J15 1x	Evesham	Rob Roy	Newark
Women J15 2x	Henley	Globe	George Watson's
Women J15 4x+	Henley A	Sir William Perkin's	Henley B
Women J14 4x	not held		

Key
Symbol	meaning
1, 2, 4, 8	crew size
+	coxed
-	coxless
x	sculls
14	Under-14
15	Under-15
16	Under-16
18	Under-18
