= 1996 British Rowing Championships =

- Venue: National Water Sports Centre
- Location: Holme Pierrepont (Nottingham)
- Dates: 19–21 July 1996

The 1996 National Rowing Championships was the 25th edition of the National Championships, held from 19–21 July 1996 at the National Water Sports Centre in Holme Pierrepont, Nottingham.

== Senior ==
=== Medal summary ===
Event	Gold	Silver	Bronze
Men 1x	Rob Roy; Simon Goodbrand	Tideway Scullers School; Alex Wake	Queens Tower; Martin Kettle
Men 2+	Oxford University / London University	Molesey	Goldie
Men 2x	Hexham / Glasgow	NCRA	Kingston
Men 2-	Imperial College / Queen's Tower	Cambridge '99	Molesey
Men 4-	NCRA	Nottingham A	Nottingham B
Men 4+	NCRA	Oxford Brookes University	Staines
Men 4x	London / London University / Walton	NCRA	Tideway Scullers School
Men 8+	London / NCRA	London University	Oxford Brookes University
Women 1x	Thames; Rachael Kininmonth	Cambridge University; Sarah Winckless	Rob Roy; Sarah Springman
Women 2x	Henley / Tideway Scullers School	Marlow	London University
Women 2-	Kingston / Thames; Jane Hall & Alison Brownless	Bedford	Wallingford
Women 4-	Bedford / Kingston / Staines / London University; Jo Nitsch, Robyn Morris, Trish Corless, Malindi Myers	Thames	Upper Thames
Women 4x	Tideway Scullers School	Derby / NCRA	City of Sheffield / Grosvenor / Rob Roy
Women 4+	London University	Bedford / Nottingham & Union	Kingston
Women 8+	Bedford / Kingston / Staines / London University / Thames Tradesmen; Jo Nitsch, Jane Hall, Robyn Morris, Trish Corless, Malindi Myers, Alison Brownless, Anna Barclay, Caroline Hobson, John Deakin (cox)	Marlow	Thames

== Lightweight ==
=== Medal summary ===
Event	Gold	Silver	Bronze
Men 1x	Tideway Scullers School	Walton	Clydesdale
Men 2x	Marlow / Worcester	Kingston	Peterborough City
Men 2-	London	Oxford Brookes University	Stourport
Men 4-	Thames Tradesmen	Clyde / Strathclyde Park	Not awarded
Men 4x	London / London University / Walton	London / Marlow / Worcester	Maidenhead
Men 8+	London/ NCRA	London	Staines
Women 1x	Thames Tradesmen	Maidenhead	St Neots
Women 2x	Loughborough / Nottingham & Union	Kingston	Stourport
Women 2-	Bedford / Thames	Thames	Leicester
Women 4-	Thames	Agecroft	Staines
Women 4x	Kingston	Thames / Tideway Scullers School	Nottingham & Union / Nottingham

== Under-23 ==
=== Medal summary ===
Event	Gold	Silver	Bronze
Men 1x	Worcester	Tideway Scullers School	Christchurch

== Junior ==
=== Medal summary ===
Event	Gold	Silver	Bronze
Men 1x	Queen Elizabeth HS	Star Club	St Edward's School
Men 2-	Kingston Grammar School	Monmouth School	Pangbourne College
Men 2x	Durham / Star Club	Staines	Halliford School / Kings Rochester
Men 4-	Westminster School	St Leonard's School	Bedford School
Men 4+	George Heriot's School / Nithsdale	Kingston Grammar School	St Leonard's School
Men 4x	Sir William Borlase	Lancaster	Wycliffe College
Men 8+	Bedford School	Abingdon School	Monmouth composite
Men J16 1x	Norwich School		
Men J16 2-	Westminster School		
Men J16 2x	St George's College		
Men J16 4+	Abingdon School		
Men J16 4-	Queen Elizabeth HS		
Men J16 4x	Windsor Boys' School	St George's College	Durham School /St Leonard's School/ Durham ARC
Men J16 8+	Eton College		
Men J15 1x	Bradford-on-Avon		
Men J15 2x	Peterborough City / Star Club		
Men J15 4x	Windsor Boys' School		
Men J14 1x	Llandaff		
Men J14 2x	St Leonard's School		
Men J14 4x	Windsor Boys' School		
Women 1x	Tideway Scullers School	Rob Roy	Queen's Park High School
Women 2x	Henley / Rob Roy	Norwich	Worcester
Women 2-	St Leonard's School	Kingston Grammar School	Haberdasher's Monmouth Girls
Women 4x	Henley / Queen's Park High School	Marlow	Henley
Women 4+	St Leonard's School	Haberdasher's Monmouth Girls	Henley
Women 8+	Haberdasher's Monmouth Girls	Scottish composite	Kingston Grammar School
Women J16 1x	Henley		
Women J16 2x	Durham		
Women J16 4+	Kingston Grammar School		
Women J16 4x	Star Club / Christchurch		
Women J15 1x	Durham		
Women J15 2x	George Watson's College		
Women J15 4x	King's School Worcester		
Women J14 1x	Hereford		
Women J14 2x	Hereford Cathedral .School		
Women J14 4x	Lady Eleanor Holles School		

== Coastal ==
=== Medal summary ===
Event	Gold	Silver	Bronze
Men 1x	John Moores Liverpool University		
Men 2-	John Moores Liverpool University / Liverpool Univ		

Key

Symbol	meaning
1, 2, 4, 8	crew size
+	coxed
-	coxless
x	sculls
14	Under-14
15	Under-15
16	Under-16
J	Junior
