= 1995 British Rowing Championships =

- Venue: National Water Sports Centre
- Location: Holme Pierrepont (Nottingham)
- Dates: 14–16 July 1995

The 1995 National Rowing Championships was the 24th edition of the National Championships, held from 14–16 July 1995 at the National Water Sports Centre in Holme Pierrepont, Nottingham. There was a new record entry of 741 crews.

== Senior ==
=== Medal summary ===
Event	Gold	Silver	Bronze
Men 1x	Rob Roy; Simon Goodbrand		
Men 2+	Isis; R Allen & R Kelly		
Men 2x	Auriol Kensington / NCRA; Andy Sinton & Carl Smith		
Men 2-	Thames Tradesmen		
Men 4-	NCRA		
Men 4+	Lea		
Men 4x	Tideway Scullers School		
Men 8+	NCRA		
Women 1x	Lea; Tish Reid	NCRA; Rowan Carroll	Tideway Scullers School; Jo Turvey
Women 2x	Henley / Tideway Scullers School; Trisha Corless & Tonia Williams		
Women 2-	Thames		
Women 4+	Thames		
Women 4-	Bedford / Thames Tradesmen / London University / Weybridge		
Women 4x	NCRA; Trisha Corless, Tonia Williams, Rowan Carroll, Lucy Hart		Tideway Scullers School; Jo Turvey
Women 8+	Tideway Scullers School		

== Lightweight ==
=== Medal summary ===
Event	Gold	Silver	Bronze
Men 1x	Rob Roy		
Men 2x	Auriol Kensington / NCRA	Henley	
Men 2-	London		
Men 4-	London		
Men 4x	NCRA		
Men 8+	London		
Women 1x	Runcorn		
Women 2x	Tideway Scullers School / Twickenham		
Women 2-	Kingston / Thames Tradesmen		
Women 4-	London University / Thames Tradesmen / Weybridge		

== Under-23 ==
=== Medal summary ===
Event	Gold	Silver	Bronze
Men 1x	Kingston		
Women 1x	Clydesdale		

== Junior ==
=== Medal summary ===
Event	Gold	Silver	Bronze
Men 1x	NCRA		
Men 2-	Bedford Modern School		
Men 2x	Windsor Boys' School		
Men 4-	Bedford School		
Men 4+	Lancaster Royal Grammar School		
Men 4x	Windsor Boys' School		
Men 8+	King's School Chester		
Men J16 1x	Marlow		
Men J16 2-	Broxbourne		
Men J16 2x	Star Club		
Men J16 4+	Bedford School		
Men J16 4-	St Leonard's School		
Men J16 4x	Sir William Borlase		
Men J16 8+	Shiplake College		
Men J15 1x	NCRA		
Men J15 2x	Westminster School		
Men J15 4x	Windsor Boys' School		
Men J14 1x	Star Club		
Men J14 2x	Westminster School		
Men J14 4x	Windsor Boys' School		
Women 1x	Bewdley		
Women 2x	Henley / Marlow		
Women 2-	St Leonard's School		
Women 4+	Bedford High School		
Women 8+	Haberdasher's Monmouth Girls		
Women J16 1x	Stourport		
Women J16 2x	Worcester		
Women J16 4+	Haberdasher's Monmouth Girls		
Women J16 4x	Henley		
Women J16 8+	Kingston Grammar School		
Women J15 1x	Kingston Grammar School		
Women J15 2x	Christchurch		
Women J15 4x	Henley		
Women J14 1x	Wallingford		
Women J14 2x	Durham		
Women J14 4x	Lady Eleanor Holles School		

== Coastal ==
=== Medal summary ===
Event	Gold	Silver	Bronze
Men 1x	Liverpool John Moores		
Men 2-	Southsea		
Men 4+	Poole		
Women 4+	Southampton		
Women 4+	Southampton		

Key

Symbol	meaning
1, 2, 4, 8	crew size
+	coxed
-	coxless
x	sculls
14	Under-14
15	Under-15
16	Under-16
J	Junior
