= Shiplake College Boat Club =

British rowing club

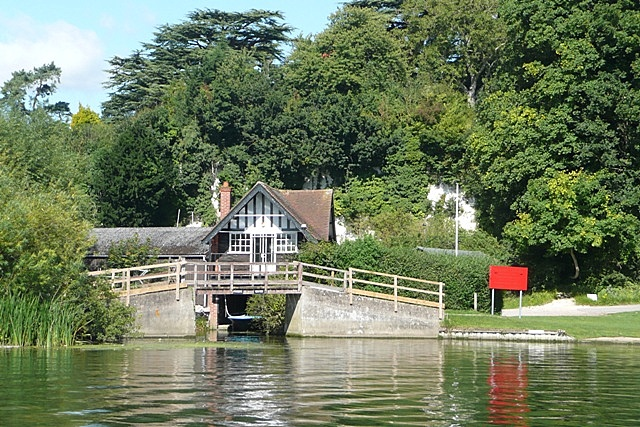

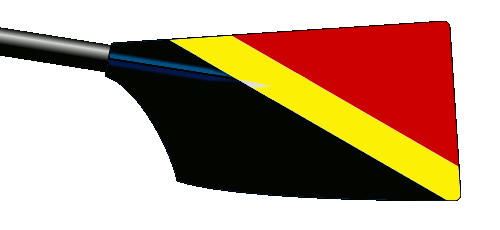
- Location: Shiplake College Boathouse, Henley-on-Thames, Oxfordshire, England
- Coordinates: 51.496801°N 0.894918°W
- Founded: 1959
- Affiliations: British Rowing boat code - SHP
- Website: www.shiplake.org.uk/1539/co-curricular/sport/rowing

Shiplake College Boat Club is a rowing club based on the River Thames at Shiplake College Boathouse, Henley-on-Thames, Oxfordshire, England. Many students go on to prestigious rowing programs across the world, including rowing for US universities such as Harvard, Princeton, Iowa and Washington.

== History ==
Shiplake College was founded in 1959 by Alexander and Eunice Everett. The boat club is owned by Shiplake College and rowing became a primary college sport due to its location on the banks of the River Thames. In 2020, the Davies Centre was completed, incorporating a new boat storage and indoor training facilities. It was officially opened for former headmaster Gregg Davies in 2021, delayed due to the COVID-19 pandemic.

In recent years the club has won both the Schools' Head of the River Race and the Non-Championship Eights at the National Schools' Regatta. The club reached its first Princess Elizabeth Challenge Cup final at the Henley Royal Regatta for 30 years in 2024, narrowly losing to St Paul's School, before beating Radley College in the 2025 final, to win the cup for the first time in the club's history.

== Shiplake Vikings ==
The Shiplake Vikings Rowing Club share the rowing facilities of the college.

== Honours ==
=== National Schools' Regatta ===
| Year | Winning crew |
|---|---|
| 2015 | Non-Championship Boys' Eights |
| 2018 | Desmond Hill Cup (Boys' J16 8+) |
| 2021 | Sherriff Cup (Girls' Championship 4x) |
| 2021 | Wimbledon Centenary Cup (Girls' 2nd 4x) |
| 2021 | Desmond Hill Cup (Boys' J16 8+) |
| 2022 | Jim Mason Plate (Girls' Championship 4+) |
| 2025 | Aylings Challenge Cup (Girls' Championship Eights) |
| 2025 | Queen Mother's Cup (Boys' Championship Eights) |

=== Schools' Head of the River Race ===
| Year | Winning crew |
|---|---|
| 2017 | Boys' Championship Eights |
| 2019 | Boys' Championship Eights (course record) |
| 2022 | Boys' Championship Eights |
| 2022 | Boys' Second Eights |
| 2022 | Girls' Championship Quads (course record) |
| 2022 | Girls' First Eights |
| 2023 | Boys' Championship Eights |
| 2023 | Boys' Second Eights |

=== Henley Royal Regatta ===
| Year | Winning crew |
|---|---|
| 1984 | Visitors' Challenge Cup |
| 2021 | Diamond Jubilee Challenge Cup |
| 2025 | Princess Elizabeth Challenge Cup |

=== Henley Women's Regatta ===
| Year | Winning crew |
|---|---|
| 2019 | Rosie Mayglothling Trophy |
| 2021 | Bea Langridge Trophy |
| 2022 | Bea Langridge Trophy |

=== British Junior Championships ===
| Year | Winning crew/s |
|---|---|
| 1981 | Men J16 2+, Men J16 8+ |
| 1982 | Men J18 4-, Men J16 2- |
| 1985 | Men J18 4- |
| 1986 | Men J18 2- |
| 1988 | Men J16 2- |
| 1992 | Men J18 4+ |
| 1995 | Men J16 8+ |
| 2021 | WJ18 1x, WJ18 2x, WJ18 4x |

=== Course records currently held ===
| Event | Category | Year set | Time |
|---|---|---|---|
| Schools' Head of the River Race | Boys' Championship Eights | 2019 | 16:36 |
| Schools' Head of the River Race | Girls' Championship Quads | 2022 | 19:15 |

== Notable former members ==
- Henry Blois-Brooke - GB men's rowing team, under 23 world champion in the x8 men's
- Ben Hunt-Davis - gold medal winner at Sydney 2000 in the x8 men's and silver medal winner at the 1999 World Championships in x8 men's
- Will Satch - gold medal winner at Rio 2016 in the x8 men's and bronze medal winner in the coxless pair at London 2012
