= Hampton School Boat Club =

British rowing club

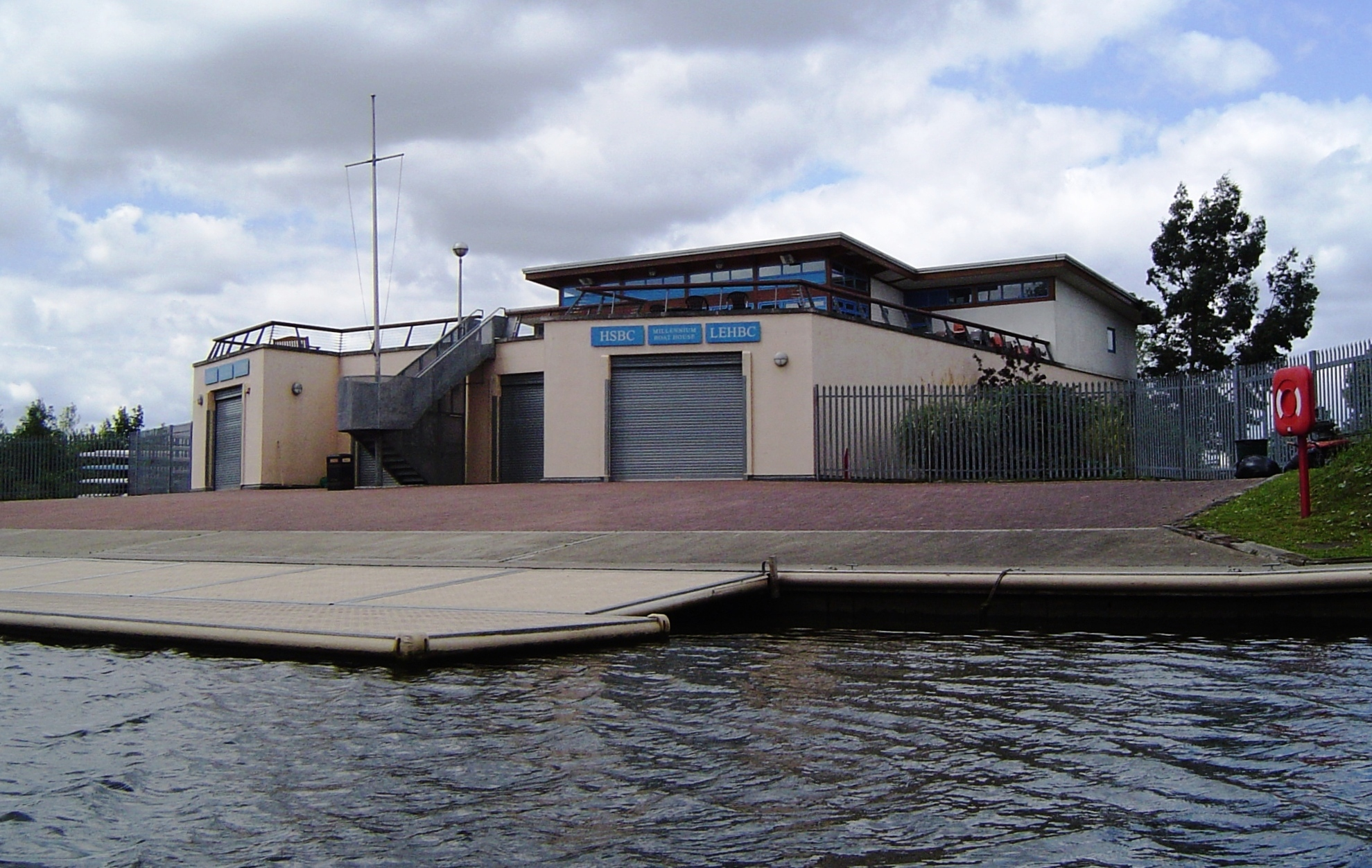

- Location: Hampton
- Coordinates: 51°24′35″N 0°22′30″W
- Home water: Molesey Lock
- Founded: 1956
- Affiliations: British Rowing (boat code HAM)

Events
- Hampton Small Boats Head, Hampton Fours and Eights Head

Notable members
- Greg Searle, Jonny Searle

Hampton School Boat Club (HSBC) is the rowing club of Hampton School. Each year the club produces 1st VIIIs that compete at Championship level in the United Kingdom. The club hosts two Head race events each year.

== History ==
The club was founded in 1956 and for many years HSBC was based at Molesey Boat Club, on the River Thames near Hampton Court Palace. In 2000 the club's Millennium Boathouse was opened 2 km upstream from Molesey weir, close to the upstream end of Platts Eyot.

The land it was built on was originally owned by Thames Water and construction of the boathouse was a joint project with the Lady Eleanor Holles School Boat Club. In 2000 the boathouse was opened by Sir Steve Redgrave and Ann Redgrave.

== Rowing at Hampton ==
Rowing at Hampton School is open to boys in the third year and above, and is split into three sections:

=== J14s ===
Third year rowers. Hampton schoolboys can join the boat club from the third year onwards. In the J14 year boys learn to scull and the emphasis is on training to improve technique, flexibility and fitness rather than competing. One week in Easter is spent as a training camp at the Millennium boathouse as well as Wimbleball Lake. During the year, the rowers showing the most promise are selected in crews for Hampton School's own rowing competition Hampton Head as well as various other events including Peterborough regatta and the National rowing championships.

=== J15s ===
Fourth year rowers. In the J15 year boys begin learning sweep-oar rowing and selection begins for J15 'A', 'B' and 'C' eights. This year is aimed as preparation for rowing in the senior squad, and the crews will compete at many of the same races as the senior squad, with the main competitions being the Schools' Head Of the River Race and the National Schools' Regatta. The J15 crew too spends a week in Hazewinkel rowing lake in Belgium.

=== The Senior squad ===
Fifth and sixth form rowers. The senior squad is made up of the oldest rowers in the school and is the squad from which the 1st, 2nd, 3rd and 4th VIIIs are selected. The senior squad travel to many head races and regattas throughout the year including the Armada Cup in Switzerland, the Schools' Head Of the River Race and The National Schools Regatta. The 1st VIII will also compete in the prestigious Princess Elizabeth Challenge Cup at Henley Royal Regatta, and the 2nd VIII will sometimes attempt to qualify for the Temple Challenge Cup.

== International representations ==
In addition to racing in the school eights, the top 'A' squad rowers each year compete at Great Britain trials to try to represent their country at the following events:

- Munich International Regatta
- Home Countries International Regatta
- Coupe de la Jeunesse
- World Rowing Junior Championships
- GB vs FRANCE

Hampton has been represented at most Junior World Rowing Championships since the event's creation.

== Hampton Head ==
The boat club hosts two rowing events each year in the head race season; Hampton Small Boats Head (the most popular head race of the year); and Hampton Fours and Eights Head. Each race is over the same distance of roughly 3 km, raced downstream from just below Sunbury Lock to the finish, roughly 50 metres downstream of Platts Eyot.

== Successes ==
Hampton has produced three treble winning 1st VIIIs in its history: 1985, 1986 and 1988. In 2004 Hampton won 1st, 2nd and 3rd VIIIs at the Schools' Head of the River Race. In 2013, at the same race, they came first in the following categories; Championship VIII's, 2nd VIII's, 3rd VIII's, J16 Championship VIII's, J16 2nd VIII's, J15 2nd VIII's, and J15 3rd VIII's, winning a total of 63 gold medals. The J14 squad also claimed medals in all three octuple categories at the National Junior Sculling Head 2014, as well as gold medals in all 4 categories in 2017.

Many rowers from Hampton have also gone on to compete at international levels and in recent years Hamptonians have consistently competed for Oxford and Cambridge in the Boat Race; in 2003 two sets of Hamptonian brothers (James and David Livingston, Matthew and Ben Smith) competed.

Two of Hampton's most successful rowers are undoubtedly brothers Jonny Searle and Greg Searle who went on to win the gold medal (together with cox Garry Herbert) in the coxed pair in the 1992 Barcelona Olympics.

== Honours ==
=== Henley Royal Regatta ===
Year	Winning crew
1985	Princess Elizabeth Challenge Cup
1986	Princess Elizabeth Challenge Cup
1988	Princess Elizabeth Challenge Cup
1989	Princess Elizabeth Challenge Cup

=== National Schools' Regatta ===
Year	Winning crew
1971	Queen Mother Challenge Cup
1985	Queen Mother Challenge Cup
1986	Queen Mother Challenge Cup
1988	Queen Mother Challenge Cup
1992	Queen Mother Challenge Cup
1999	Queen Mother Challenge Cup

=== Schools' Head of the River Race ===
Year	Winning crew
1977	Eights
1985	Eights
1986	Eights
1987	Eights
1988	Eights
1989	Eights
1999	Eights
2000	Eights
2013	Eights

=== British champions ===
Year	Winning crew/s
1973	Men J16 4+, Men J16 4-
1977	Men J18 4-, Men J18 8+
1978	Men J18 8+
1980	Men J16 2-
1981	Men J18 4-
1982	Men J14 4x
1984	Men J16 1x
1985	Men J16 2-
1986	Men J16 2+
1991	Men J16 4-
1994	Men J15 2x
1999	Men J18 2-, Men J18 4-, Men J16 4+
2001	Men J16 2-
2002	Men J16 2-
2009	Open J16 2-, Open J15 4x+
2010	Open J14 4x+
2011	Open J18 4-
2017	Open J18 4-, Open J18 8+
2021	Open J16 4+

== See also ==
- Rowing on the River Thames
