= Monkton Combe School Boat Club =

English Public School Boat Club

- Location: Monkton Combe, Somerset, United Kingdom
- Home water: River Avon
- Founded: 1878 (MCSBC); 1956 (Bluefriars)
- Boat Code: MNK (MCSBC); MNB (Bluefriars)
- Affiliations: British Rowing; Monkton Combe School
- Website: https://bluefriars.org.uk/about/

Monkton Combe School Boat Club (MCSBC) is the boat club for pupils of Monkton Combe School, established in 1878.

The school maintains two boathouses, both on the River Avon. The older is situated on the edge of the Senior school grounds, sitting below the Dundas Aqueduct and is used mainly for junior rowing.

In 2014 the school opened a second boathouse in the nearby village of Saltford, named the ‘John Chaplin Boathouse’. The new boathouse benefits from a wider and straighter stretch of river, as well as more spacious land facilities so is used for the club’s performance rowing program.

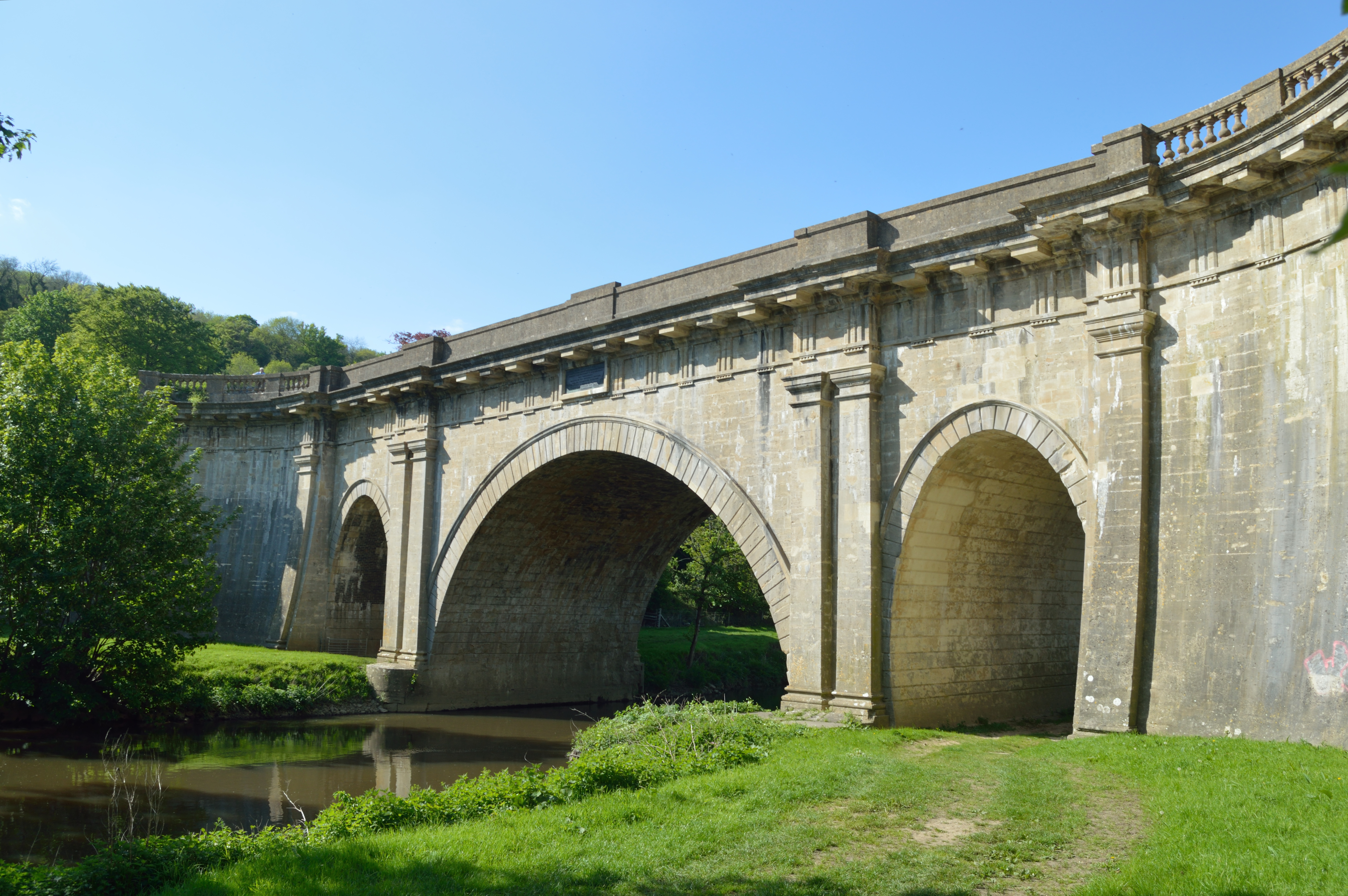
Dundas Aqueduct, behind which sits the older boathouse

Amongst the notable results achieved by Monkton were in 1914, winning the Public Schools' Challenge Cup at Marlow Regatta; 1952 when the club were runners-up in the Princess Elizabeth Challenge Cup at Henley Royal Regatta; and 1983 when the club won the J18 Women’s Eights at Schools' Head of the River Race.

MCSBC alumni row as the Monkton Bluefriars Boat Club. ‘Bluefriars’ is also the racing name of MSCBC.

== Notable Rowers ==
Many MCSBC rowers have gone on to represent England and Great Britain internationally, with the following winning medals in rowing at the Olympic Games:

- Alfred Mellows DFC (Silver in VIIIs at London, 1948)
- Michael Lapage (Silver in VIIIs at London, 1948)
- Ran Laurie (Gold in Coxless IIs at London, 1948)
- Rowley Douglas MBE (Gold in VIIIs at Sydney, 2000)
- Alex Partridge (Silver in VIIIs at Beijing, 2008)
- Steve Williams OBE (Gold in Coxless IVs at Athens 2004, Beijing 2008)

In addition, Matt Wells (Bronze in Double Sculls at Beijing, 2008) served as rowing master in the years after the opening of the school’s new Saltford Rowing Centre.

While not a Monkton alumnus, notable rowing YouTuber and GB athlete Cameron Buchan trains from the club’s Saltford boathouse, and often races under MCSBC colours.

== Monkton Bluefriars Boat Club ==
An alumni boat club, Monkton Bluefriars Boat Club, was founded in 1956 as an Open Boat Club (originally called Monkton Blue Friars BC) to encourage MCSBC alumni to meet socially and in boats. It was first registered with the Amateur Rowing Association in 1964 and is now registered with British Rowing as a separate boat club to MCSBC, though still views the latter as its ‘parent club’.

=== Bluefriars’ Charity ===
In 1995 the Monkton Bluefriars Charitable Trust was created to encourage a greater level of charitable giving in order to support young rowers. The purpose of the Trust was widened to include support for students rowing in other clubs as well as Monktonians. The Trust supplies grants to help fund equipment or events for athletes who cannot afford to cover the costs themselves, depending on their financial situation.

The charity's aims are twofold:

- To promote the physical education and development of pupils, former pupils, staff and parents of Monkton Combe School by encouraging and facilitating the sport of rowing through the provision of facilities, equipment and financial support, including sponsorship of individuals or crews training for and participating in competitive events where such individuals or crews represent the School or Monkton Bluefriars Boat Club.
- To promote the physical education and development of students of such other educational establishments as the Trustees shall in their absolute discretion determine, by encouraging and facilitating the sport of rowing through the provision of facilities, equipment and financial support, including sponsorship of individuals or crews training for and participating in competitive events.

=== Newsletter ===
Bluefriars has produced an annual newsletter for members since November 1981, formerly edited by the school's former master and rowing coach Julian Bewick.

== Events ==
The Bluefriars Club organises the Monkton Bluefriars Small Boats Head every October, usually held from the school’s John Chaplin Boathouse at Saltford, near Bath, Somerset, and an annual dinner at the Leander Club.
