= Malindi Myers =

British rower

Personal information
- Nationality: British
- Born: 3 October 1970 (age 55)
Medal record
Women's rowing
Representing Great Britain
World Championships
Gold medal – first place	2000 Zagreb	LW2-
Silver medal – second place	1996 Glasgow	LW4-
Silver medal – second place	1999 St. Catharines	LW2-
Bronze medal – third place	1997 Aiguebelette-le-Lac	LW2-

Malindi Myers (born 3 October 1970) is a British civil servant and former international rower.

== Rowing career ==
Myers rowed for Durham University Boat Club while studying economics. After winning two golds at the 1996 National Championships in the coxless four and eights she was part of the British crew that won silver in the Lightweight Women's Coxless Four at the 1996 World Rowing Championships.

She won further medals at both the 1997 World Rowing Championships and the 1999 World Rowing Championships before becoming a World Champion at the 2000 World Rowing Championships, winning the Lightweight Women's Coxless Pair alongside Miriam Taylor.

== Economist ==
Following a Masters in Environmental and Natural Resource Economics she joined HM Treasury as a junior economist after university, and later took time out to prepare for the 1996 World Rowing Championships.

After the 1996 World Championships she returned to the Civil Service and then to the European Commission on a secondment scheme. She secured a job with the Government Economic Service before joining the Office for National Statistics.
