= 1986 British Rowing Championships =

- Venue: National Water Sports Centre
- Location: Holme Pierrepont (Nottingham)
- Dates: 18–20 July 1986

The 1986 National Rowing Championships was the 15th edition of the National Championships, held from 18–20 July 1986 at the National Water Sports Centre in Holme Pierrepont, Nottingham.

== Senior ==
=== Medal summary ===
Event	Gold	Silver	Bronze
Men 1x	Northwich		
Men 2+	London University		
Men 2x	Kingston		
Men 2-	Leander		
Men 4-	London University		
Men 4+	Leander	Kingston	Lea
Men 4x	Lea		
Men 8+	Bedford Star		
Women 1x	Trent Polytechnic; Rachel Hirst		
Women 2x	Birmingham University / Pengwern; Claire Parker & Diane Prince		
Women 2-	Lea / Sons of the Thames; Ruth Howe & Jackie Prout		
Women 4+	Thames		
Women 4x	Osiris / Thames		
Women 8+	Cambridge University / City of Cambridge	dead-heat	Not awarded

== Lightweight ==
=== Medal summary ===
Event	Gold	Silver	Bronze
Men 1x	Tideway Scullers School		
Men 2x	Molesey / St Ives		
Men 4-	Lea		
Men 8+	Thames Tradesmen		
Women 1x	Glasgow		
Women 2x	London University / Weybridge Ladies		
Women 4-	Oxford University		

== Junior ==
=== Medal summary ===
Event	Gold	Silver	Bronze
Men 1x	Newcastle Royal Grammar School		
Men 2-	Shiplake College		
Men 2x	St George's College		
Men 2+	Royal Shrewsbury School		
Men 4-	Emanuel School		
Men 4+	Royal Chester		
Men 4x	Forest School		
Men 8+	St George's College		
Men J16 1x	Christchurch		
Men J16 2-	Eton College		
Men J16 2x	Marlow		
Men J16 2+	Hampton School		
Men J16 4+	Eton College		
Men J16 4-	Sir William Borlase		
Men J16 4x	Latymer Upper		
Men J16 8+	Eton College		
Men J14 1x	Wallingford		
Men J14 2x	Kingston Grammar School		
Men J14 4x	Westminster School		
Women 1x	Marlow		
Women 2x	A.R.A Squad		
Women 2-	A.R.A Squad		
Women 4x	Mark Rutherford School		
Women 4+	A.R.A Squad		
Women 8+	St Leonard's School		
Women J16 1x	Weybridge Ladies		
Women J16 2x	Becket School		
Women J16 2-	Clyde		
Women J16 4x+	Queen Elizabeth HS		
Women J16 8+	Athena Ladies		
Women J14 1x	Weybridge Ladies		
Women J14 2x	St Neots		

== Coastal ==
=== Medal summary ===
Event	Gold	Silver	Bronze
Men 1x	Southsea		
Men 2-	Deal, Walmer & Kingsdown		
Men 4+	Christchurch		
Women 4+	Christchurch		

Key

Symbol	meaning
1, 2, 4, 8	crew size
+	coxed
-	coxless
x	sculls
14	Under-14
15	Under-15
16	Under-16
J	Junior
