= King's School Canterbury Boat Club =

Rowing club in Kent

- Location: Brett Sturry Quarry, Westbere Lakes, Sturry, Canterbury, Kent, England
- Coordinates: 51.301454°N 1.131340°E
- Affiliations: British Rowing boat code - KCA
- Website: www.kingsrowing.co.uk

King's School Canterbury Boat Club is a rowing club based at Brett Sturry Quarry, Westbere Lakes, Sturry, Canterbury, Kent, England.

== History ==
The club has a boathouse at Plucks Gutter on the River Stour and is owned by The King's School, Canterbury, with rowing being a major school sport.

The club is very successful and has produced several British champions.

Several successful Olympic rowers also began their careers rowing for the King's School Canterbury Boat Club during their school years. Among the most illustrious are Frances Houghton and Tom Ransley. Frances Houghton, a five-time female Olympian, rowed in the 2000, 2004, 2008, 2012 and 2016 Olympics, winning three Olympic silver medals in addition to four gold World Rowing Championship medals. Tom Ransley won a bronze Olympic medal in 2012, and a gold Olympic medal in the Men's Eight in 2016. Further alumni Olympians include Alan Barret (1936), Richard Fishlock (1960), Colin Porter (1960), Thomas Bishop (1976), John Maxey (1988), Nick Strange (1996), and Fred Scarlett (2000).

== Honours ==
=== Schools' Head of the River Race ===
Year	Winning crew
1960	J18 eights
1961	J18 eights
1964	J18 eights

=== British champions ===
Year	Winning crew
1977	Men J16 2+
1978	Men J16 2x
1998	Women 2x, Women 4x
2015	Open J18 4-
2016	Open J18 2-
2018	Open J16 2-
2019	Open J18 2-, Open J16 2-

Key

- J junior
- 2, 4, 8 crew size
- 18, 16, 15, 14 age group
- x sculls
- - coxless
- + coxed
