= St Paul's School Boat Club =

British rowing club

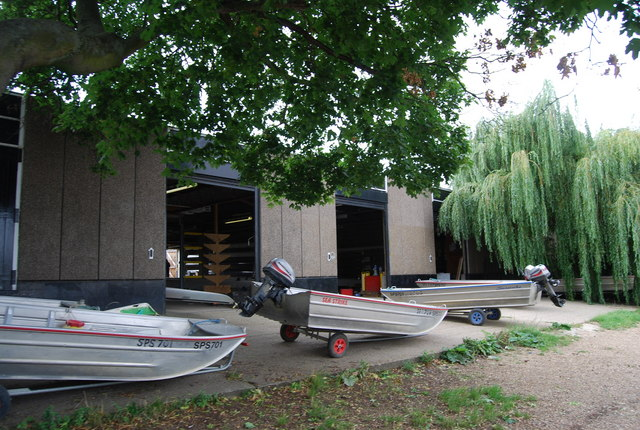

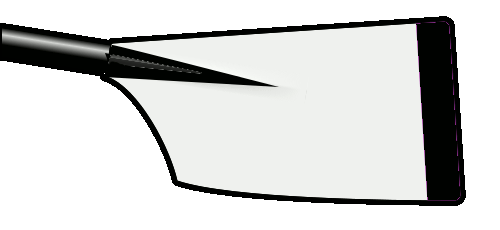
- Location: St Paul's School Boathouse, Barnes, London, England
- Coordinates: 51.488733°N 0.235820°W
- Affiliations: British Rowing boat code - SPS
- Website: www.stpaulsschool.org.uk

St Paul's School Boat Club is a rowing club based on the River Thames at St Paul's School Boathouse, Barnes, London, England.

== History ==
The boat club is owned by St Paul's School, London and rowing is a primary school sport due to its location on the River Thames.

The club has won the prestigious Princess Elizabeth Challenge Cup at the Henley Royal Regatta on nine occasions and has won both the Queen Mother Challenge Cup at the National Schools' Regatta and the Schools' Head of the River Race.

The club is currently the record holders for the Championship Junior Events at the Head of the Charles Regatta, Schools' Head of the River Race, National Schools' Regatta and the Princess Elizabeth Challenge Cup at Henley Royal Regatta.

== Honours ==
=== National Schools' Regatta ===
Year	Winning crew
2017	Queen Mother Challenge Cup
2018	Queen Mother Challenge Cup
2019	Queen Mother Challenge Cup
2024	Queen Mother Challenge Cup

=== Henley Royal Regatta ===
Year	Winning crew
1950	Princess Elizabeth Challenge Cup
1953	Princess Elizabeth Challenge Cup
1957	Princess Elizabeth Challenge Cup
1979	Special Race for Schools
1997	Princess Elizabeth Challenge Cup
2015	Princess Elizabeth Challenge Cup
2018	Princess Elizabeth Challenge Cup
2022	Princess Elizabeth Challenge Cup
2024	Princess Elizabeth Challenge Cup
2026	Princess Elizabeth Challenge Cup

=== Schools' Head of the River Race ===
Year	Winning crew
1946	Championship Eights
1950	Championship Eights
1951	Championship Eights
1956	Championship Eights
1957	Championship Eights
1996	Championship Eights
2003	Championship Eights
2014	Championship Eights
2018	Championship Eights
2024	Championship Eights
2025	Championship Eights

=== British champions ===
Year	Winning crew/s
1983	Men J16 4+, Men J16 8+
1984	Men J18 8+
2000	Men J18 4+
2021	Open J18 8+
