= Emanuel School Boat Club =

British rowing club

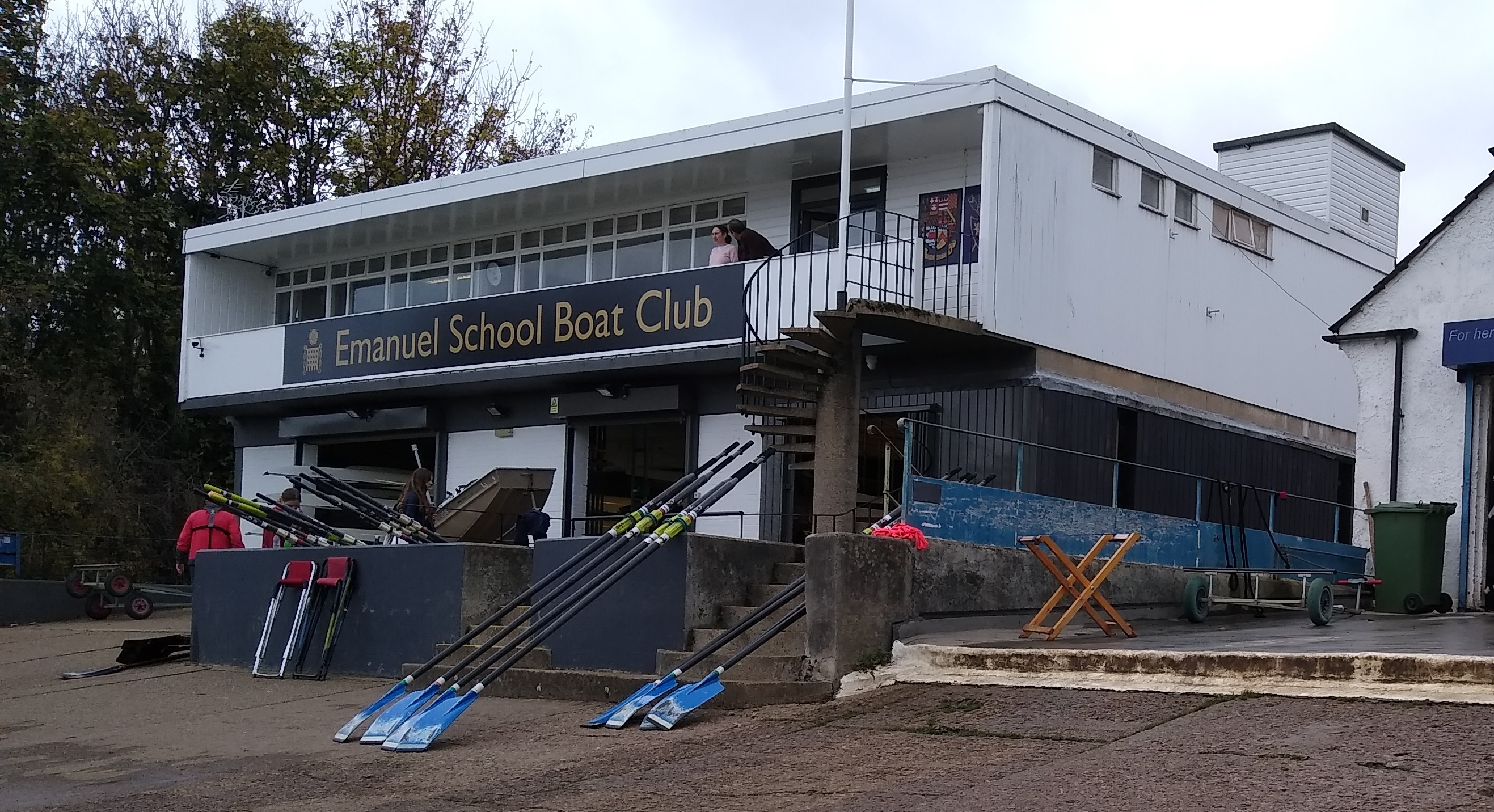

- Location: Dukes Meadows, Chiswick, London
- Coordinates: 51.473788°N 0.254011°W
- Affiliations: British Rowing (boat code EMA)
- Website: www.emanuel.org.uk/beyond-the-classroom/sport/

Emanuel School Boat Club is a rowing club on the River Thames, based at Dukes Meadows, Chiswick, London.

== History ==
The club belongs to Emanuel School and has 70 boats and a weights and ergo room for training at their boathouse. The club was the dominant force in schoolboy rowing during the 1960s, a period in which it won the Schools' Head of the River Race an unprecedented eight times in nine years. In total it has won the Schools' Head 11 times (behind only the 14 of Eton College) and won the Princess Elizabeth Challenge Cup at the Henley Regatta in 1966, finishing runner-up on three further occasions.

== Honours ==
=== Henley Royal Regatta ===
Year	Winning crew
1966	Princess Elizabeth Challenge Cup

=== Schools' Head of the River Race ===
Year	Winning crew
1962	J18 eights
1963	J18 eights
1965	J18 eights
1966	J18 eights
1967	J18 eights
1968	J18 eights
1969	J18 eights
1970	J18 eights
1975	J18 eights
1976	J18 eights
1981	J18 eights

=== British champions ===
Year	Winning crew/s
1974	Men J16 2-, Men J16 8+, Women J18 4+
1975	Men J18 8+
1976	Men J18 8+
1980	Men J16 8+
1981	Men J18 4-
1986	Men J18 4-
1988	Men J18 2-
1990	Men J16 8+, Men J16 4x
1991	Men J16 2-, Men J16 4+
1992	Men J18 2-

== See also ==
- Rowing on the River Thames
