= Kingston Grammar School Boat Club =

Rowing club in Surrey, England

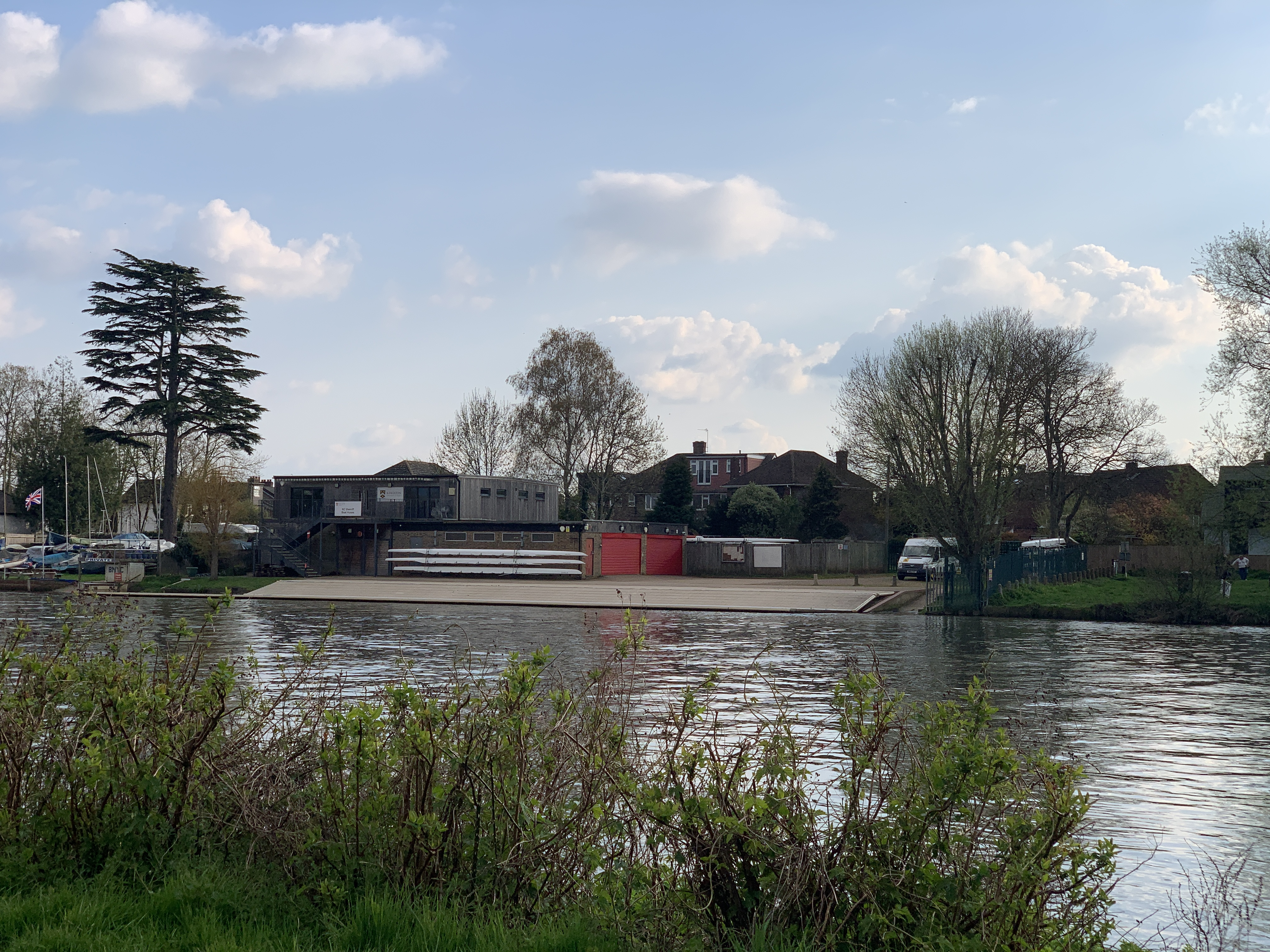

- Location: Aragon Avenue, Thames Ditton, Elmbridge borough of Surrey
- Coordinates: 51.397766°N 0.335809°W
- Home water: Hampton Court Reach, River Thames
- Founded: 1889
- Affiliations: British Rowing (boat code KGS)
- Website: sport.kgs.org.uk

Notable members
- RC Sherriff, Sophie Hosking, James Cracknell

Kingston Grammar School Boat Club (KGSBC) is a rowing club on the River Thames, based at Aragon Avenue, Thames Ditton, Elmbridge borough of Surrey.

== History ==
The club was founded in 1889 and belongs to the Kingston Grammar School.

The club has produced multiple British champions, achieving particular success in the late 1980s to early 1990s under the leadership of head coach Peter Sheppard, during which time it was victorious in the Schools' Head of the River Race and produced a number of subsequent Olympic champions, including James Cracknell.

== Honours ==
=== National Schools' Regatta ===
Year	Winning crew/s
1985	Child Beale Cup (JM 1st 8+)
1990	Anna Fangen Cup (JW16 4+)
1991	Leander Cup (JW 2-), Danesfield Cup (JM16 2-), Centenary Sculls (JM15 1x)
1992	Child Beale Cup (JM 1st 8+), Jim Mason Plate (JW 4+), Arundel Cup (JM16 4+), Windsor Cup (JM16 4-)
1996	Anna Fangen Cup (JW16 4+), Creber Cup (JM15 4x+)
1998	Danesfield Cup (JM16 2-)
1999	Arundel Cup (JM16 4+)
2002	Fours Cup (JM Sch 4+), Creber Cup (JM15 4x+)
2003	Fours Cup (JM Sch 4+)
2004	Aylings Challenge Cup (JW 8+), Leander Cup (JW 2-)
2009	Windsor Cup (JM16 4-), Leslie Langton Cup (JW15 4+)
2013	Headington Cup (JW16 2-), Junior Colts Cup (JM15 8+)
2014	Leander Cup (JW 2-)
2017	Headington Cup (JW16 2-)
2024	Royal Engineers' Cup (JM 4-)
2025	Jim Mason Plate (JW 4+), Anna Fangen Cup (JW16 4+), Katrina Jacks Trophy (JW15 4+)

=== British champions ===
Year	Winning crew/s
1981	Men J16 8+
1983	Men J16 2-, Men J16 4-, Men J14 4x
1984	Men J16 4+, Men J14 4x
1985	Men 2x, Women J16 2-, Women J14 2x
1986	Men J14 2x
1987	Men J16 2x, Men J16 4x, Men J14 2x, Women J14 2x
1988	Men J16 4x, Women J14 4x
1989	Men J18 4x, Women J14 2x
1992	Men J16 4-
1993	Men J18 4-
1994	Women J18 4+, Women J15 2x
1995	Women J16 8+, Women J15 1x
1996	Men J18 2-, Women J16 4+
1997	Women J18 2x
1998	Women J18 2-
2002	Women J18 4-
2003	Men J16 4+
2007	Open J18 4+
2009	Women J18 8+
2021	WJ16 4x
2023	WJ18 4x

=== Schools' Head of the River Race ===
Year	Winning crew
1993	J18 men’s eights
1994	J18 men’s eights
1995	J18 women’s eights
1996	J18 women’s eights
2003	J18 women’s eights
2004	J18 women’s eights
2025	School Girl eights

== See also ==
- Rowing on the River Thames
