= Latymer Upper School Boat Club =

British rowing club

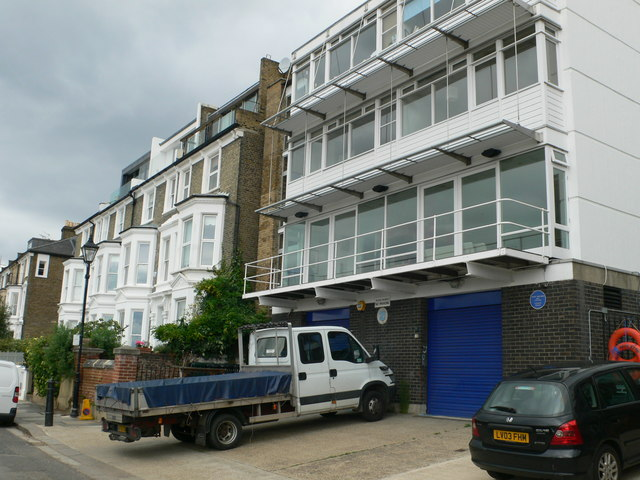

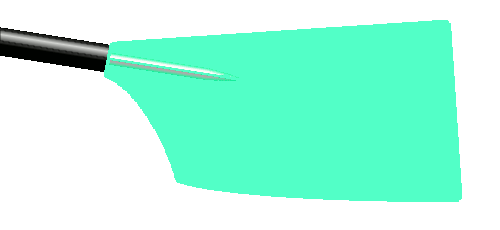
- Location: 40A Upper Mall, Hammersmith, London, England
- Coordinates: 51.490528°N 0.237185°W
- Affiliations: British Rowing (boat code LTU)
- Website: www.latymer-upper.org/extra-curricular/sport-overview/

Latymer Upper School Boat Club is a rowing club on the River Thames, based at 40A Upper Mall, Hammersmith, London, England.

== History ==
The club belongs to Latymer Upper School. The club won the prestigious Diamond Jubilee Challenge Cup at the Henley Regatta in 2013 and 2019 and produced a national champion crew in 2010.

== Honours ==
=== Henley Royal Regatta ===
Year	Winning crew
2013	Diamond Jubilee Challenge Cup
2019	Diamond Jubilee Challenge Cup

=== National champions ===
Year	Winning crew/s
1976	Men J16 8+
1985	Men J18 4x
1986	Men J16 4x
1988	Men J18 4x
2010	Women 4x

== Notable members ==
- Jim Clark (coach)
- Andy Holmes
- Samuel Strong
- Alan Watson (olympic oarsman, coach)

== See also ==
- Rowing on the River Thames
