= Windsor Boys' School Boat Club =

British rowing club

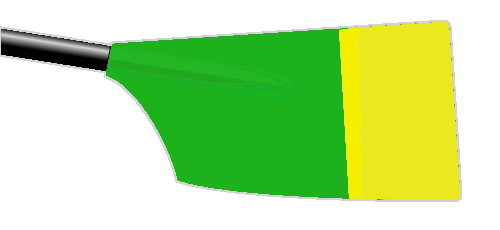
- Location: 7 Stovell Road, Windsor, Berkshire
- Coordinates: 51.486201°N 0.619954°W
- Founded: 1940
- Affiliations: British Rowing boat code - WBS
- Website: twbs.co.uk/rowing/

Windsor Boys' School Boat Club is a rowing club based on the River Thames at 7 Stovell Road, Windsor, Berkshire.

== History ==
On 18 January 1939 the new school site was opened and just one year later in 1940 the Boat Club was founded.

The club was formed by members of Eton Excelsior Rowing Club who wanted to keep their club active during World War II. The club today belongs to The Windsor Boys' School of which rowing is their primary sport. The current boathouse is situated behind the School's playing fields on the River Thames.

The club had produced multiple British champions, with the most recent being two national titles at the 2025 British Rowing Club Championships.

== Honours ==
=== British champions ===
Year	Winning crew
1983	J18 2x
1989	J18 8+, J16 2-
1990	J18 4+, J14 2x
1991	J18 2+
1992	J15 4x, J14 4x
1993	J16 4x, J15 4x
1994	J16 4x, J14 4x
1995	J18 2x, J18 4x, J15 4x, J14 4x
1996	J16 4x, J15 4x, J14 4x
1998	J18 2x, J18 4x, J15 4x+, J14 4x+
2000	J14 4x+
2001	J18 4+, J16 4x, J15 4x+
2004	J14 4x+
2005	J15 4x+, J14 4x+
2006	J16 4+, J15 1x
2007	J18 1x, J18 4x, J14 4x+
2009	J16 4x
2010	J16 4x
2010	J16 4x
2011	J15 4x+
2015	J16 2x, Open J15 4x+
2019	J15 4x+
2021	Open J18 4x, Open J15 4x+
2022	Open J18 4x, Open J18 2x, Open J16 4x, Open J15 4x+ Open J14 4x+
2023	Open J18 4-, Open J18 4x, Open J15 4x+, Open J15 4x+,
2024	Open J16 4x-
2025	Open J18 2x, Open J18 4x-

Key = J junior, 2, 4, 8 crew size, 18, 16, 15, 14 age group, x sculls, - coxless, + coxed

=== Henley Royal Regatta ===
Year	Winning crew
1994	Fawley Challenge Cup
1995	Fawley Challenge Cup
1996	Fawley Challenge Cup
1997	Fawley Challenge Cup
1998	Fawley Challenge Cup
2017	Fawley Challenge Cup
2018	Fawley Challenge Cup
2022	Fawley Challenge Cup
2024	Fawley Challenge Cup
2025	Fawley Challenge Cup
