= Westminster School Boat Club =

British rowing club

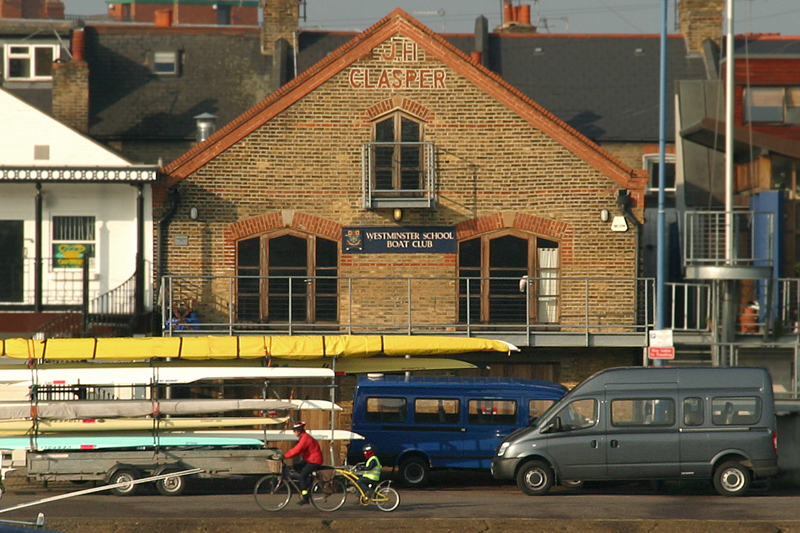

- Location: Embankment, Putney, London
- Coordinates: 51.469285°N 0.220001°W
- Home water: River Thames
- Affiliations: British Rowing boat code - WES
- Website: www.wsboat.club

Westminster School Boat Club is a rowing club based on the River Thames at the Embankment, Putney, London.

== History ==
The club is reputedly the oldest rowing club in the world. Anecdotal evidence exists for rowing at Westminster in the 18th century and official records date back to the 'Water Ledger' of 1813. Pink was chosen by Westminster as the School's colour for the rowing match against Eton College of 4 May 1837; before this race, both schools wore blue.

Crews containing boys and girls who attend, or are affiliated to, Westminster School are formed to race at all levels of school rowing. The boat house is also that of the Elizabethan Boat Club, made up of Old Westminsters, who compete in major domestic and international races.

== Honours ==
=== National Schools' Regatta ===
Year	Winning crew
2009	Forest Cup
2015	Queen Mother Challenge Cup
2016	Queen Mother Challenge Cup

=== Schools' Head of the River Race ===
Year	Winning crew
1971	Eights
2015	Eights
2016	Eights

=== Henley Royal Regatta ===
Year	Races won
2009	Fawley Challenge Cup, Princess Grace Challenge Cup

=== British champions ===
Year	Winning crew/s
1973	Men J18 1x, Men J16 2+
1986	Men J14 4x
1988	Men J16 1x
1989	Men J18 4x, Men J16 4+
1994	Men J16 2-
1995	Men J15 2x, Men J14 2x
1996	Men J18 4-, Men J16 2-
1997	Men J15 2x
2000	Men J16 2-
2002	Women 2-, Women 4+
2021	Open J18 4-, Open J16 2-

== See also ==
- Rowing on the River Thames
- Westminster School
- Schools' Head of the River Race
