= Lea Rowing Club =

English Rowing club

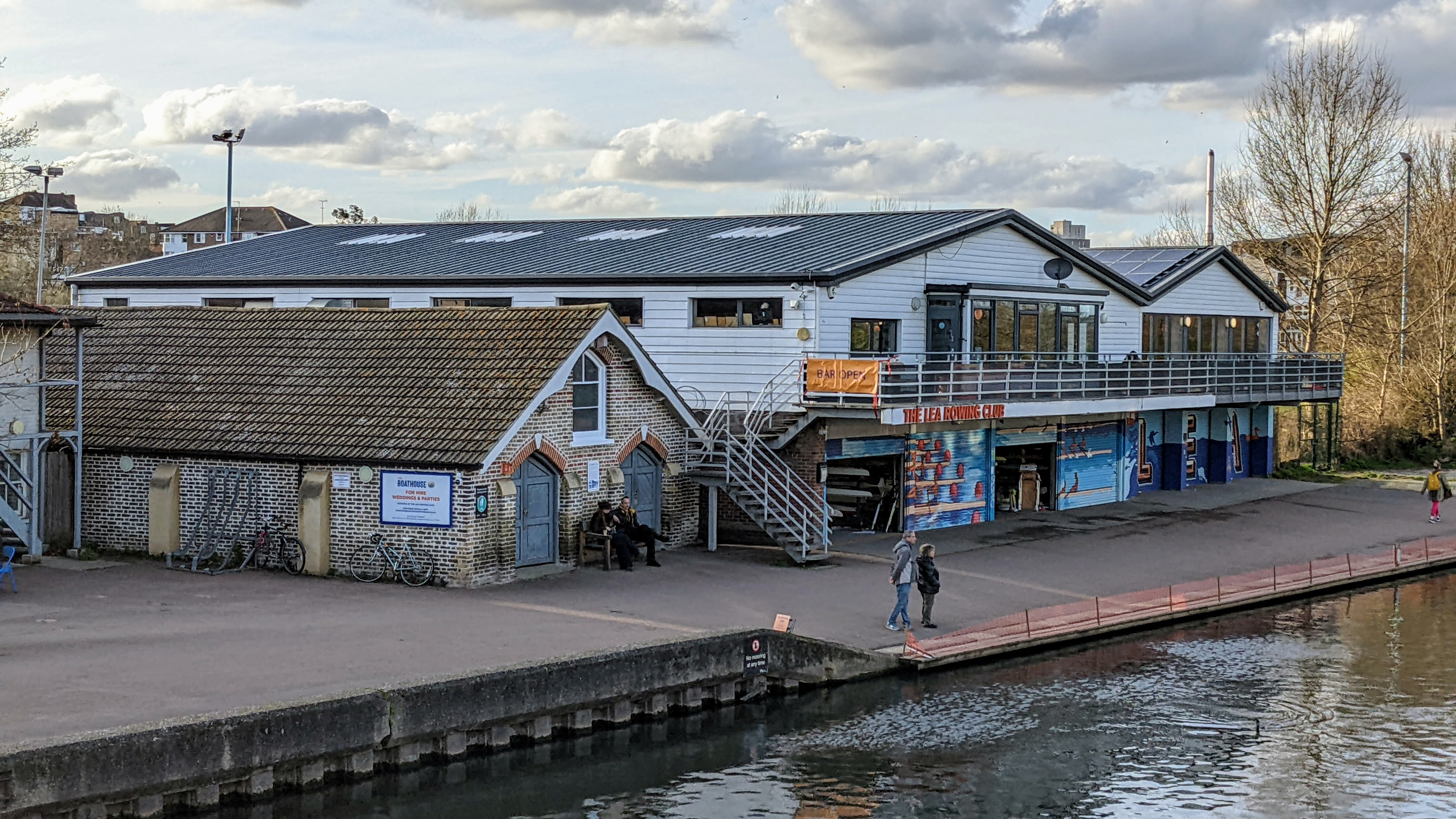

- Lea Rowing Club, Spring Hill, Clapton
- Location: Hackney, London, England
- Coordinates: 51.573197°N 0.059176°W
- Home water: River Lea; London Regatta Centre
- Founded: 1980
- Affiliations: British Rowing boat code - LEA
- Website: www.learc.org.uk

Events
- Lea Spring Regatta (April); Lea Autumn Regatta (September)

Lea Rowing Club is a rowing club based in Hackney, London, England, on the River Lea.

Founded in 1980 by the merger of several clubs, it is now the largest club in East London, catering for adults and children who want to compete at the highest level nationally and internationally, as well as those who want to enjoy rowing socially. In 2022, the club won the British Rowing "Club of the Year" award.

== History ==
Lea Rowing Club was founded in 1980 by the members of all of the five rowing clubs then active on the Springhill, Hackney site. The clubs that merged were Crowland, Gladstone Warwick, City Orient, and Britannia rowing clubs, joined by the women's club, Stuart Ladies.

The club has produced multiple British champions. It has also won several times at Henley Royal Regatta.

== Honours ==
=== British champions ===
Year	Winning crew/s
1972	J16 2- (As City Orient Rowing Club)
1973	Women 4+ (As Stuart Ladies)
1975	Women 2-, Women 4+, Women 4x (As Stuart Ladies)
1979	Men L2x, Men J16 2- & Men J16 4- (As City Orient Rowing Club) / Women 2- (As Stuart Ladies)
1980	J16 1x (As City Orient Rowing Club)
1981	Women 2-, WJ18 4+
1982	Men 2x, J18 4x, WJ18 2-
1984	Men 2+
1985	Men L4+
1986	Men 4x, Women 2+, Men L4-
1987	Men 2x, Men 4-, Men 4+
1989	Men L4X+, WJ16 4x+
1990	Men 2+, Men 4+
1993	WJ18 1x, WJ18 2-
1995	Men 4+, Women 1x
2009	WJ18 4x
2010	WJ18 4x
2012	WJ18 1x
2015	J16 4x
2016	J15 2x
2017	J16 2x, WJ16 4+
2018	WJ18 2-, WJ16 4+
2022	J15 2x
2024	Open 1x, J18 4x, WJ18 2x, J18 2x

=== Henley Royal Regatta ===
Year	Races won
1968	Henley Prize (as Crowland Rowing Club).
1977	Wyfold Challenge Cup (as City Orient)
1979	Britannia Challenge Cup (as City Orient)
1983	Wyfold Challenge Cup, Britannia Challenge Cup
1987	Britannia Challenge Cup
1992	Thames Challenge Cup
1995	Wyfold Challenge Cup
