= Henley Rowing Club =

British rowing club

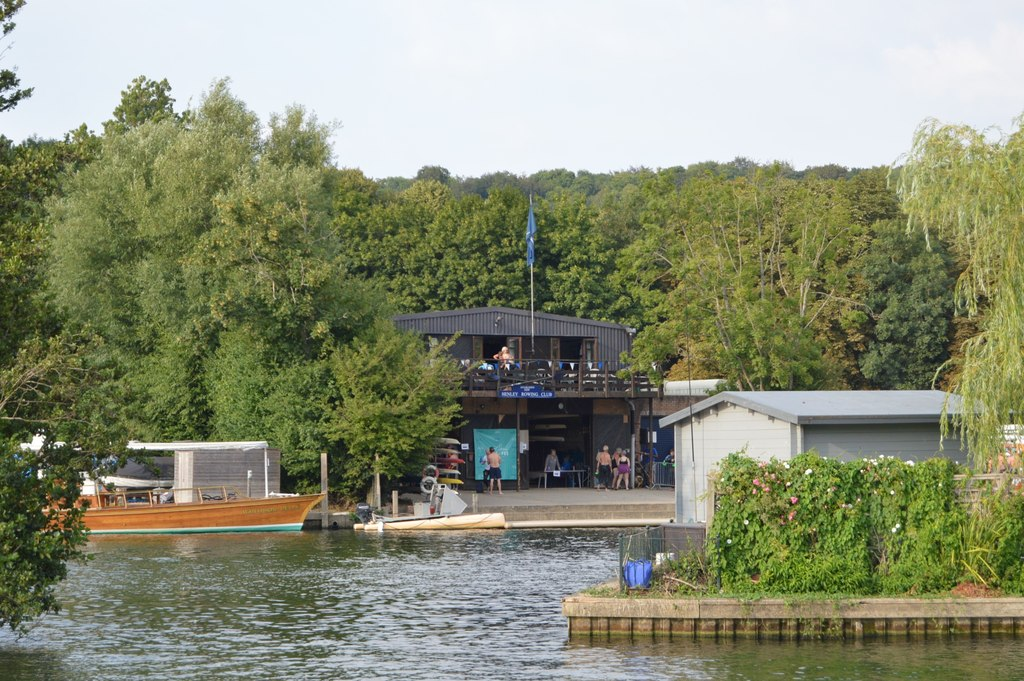

- Location: Henley-on-Thames, Oxfordshire, England
- Coordinates: 51.533868°N 0.893820°W
- Home water: Henley, River Thames
- Founded: 1839
- Affiliations: British Rowing boat code - HEN
- Website: www.henleyrowingclub.co.uk

Henley Rowing Club is a rowing club on the River Thames based on Wargrave Road, Henley-on-Thames, Oxfordshire.

== History ==
The club was founded in 1839, thus making it one of the oldest rowing clubs in the Great Britain.

The club were the Victor Ludorum champions at the 2014 British Rowing Junior Championships, 2016 British Rowing Junior Championships, 2017 British Rowing Junior Championships and 2018 British Rowing Junior Championships.

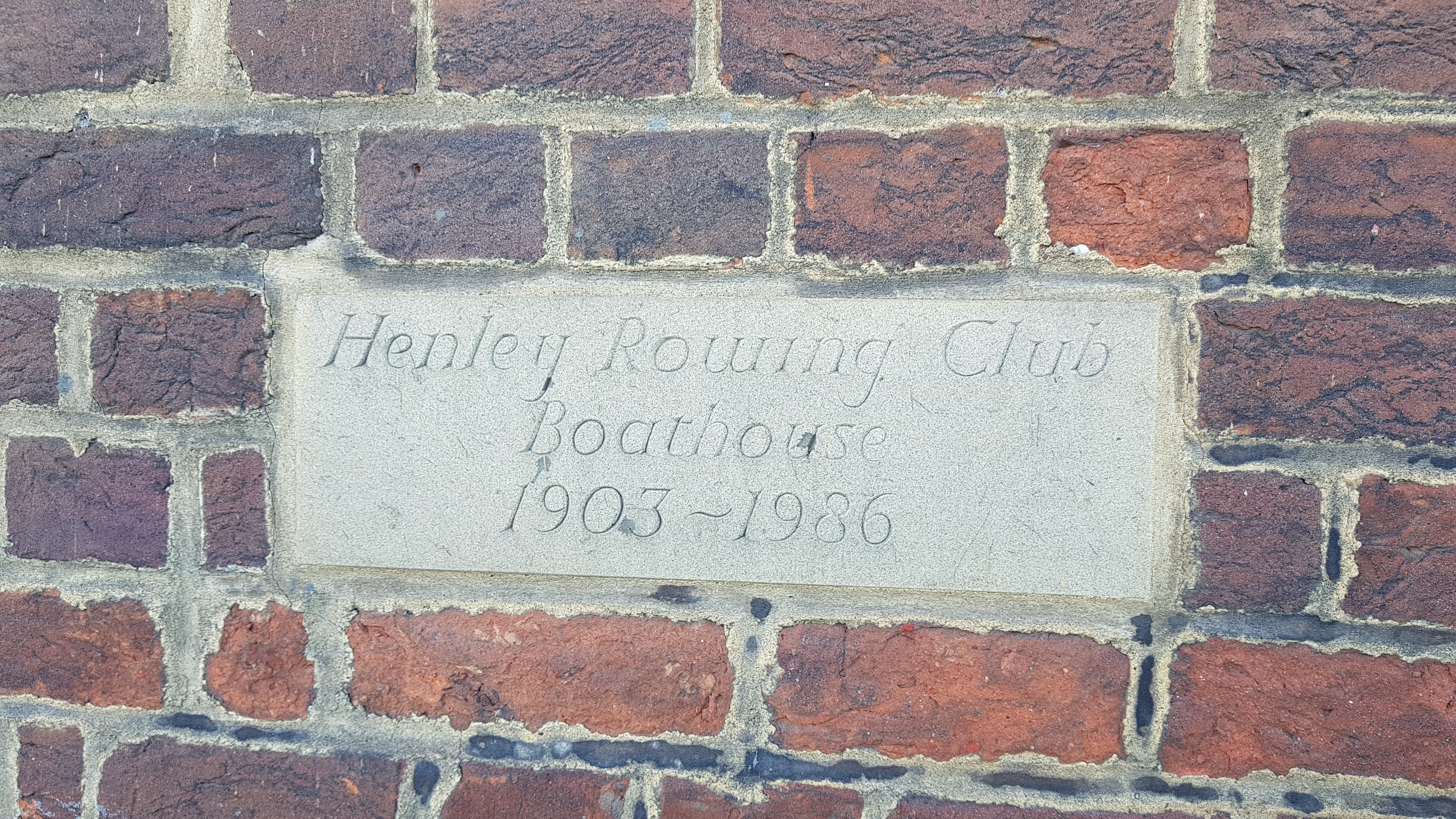
Henley Rowing Club Boathouse

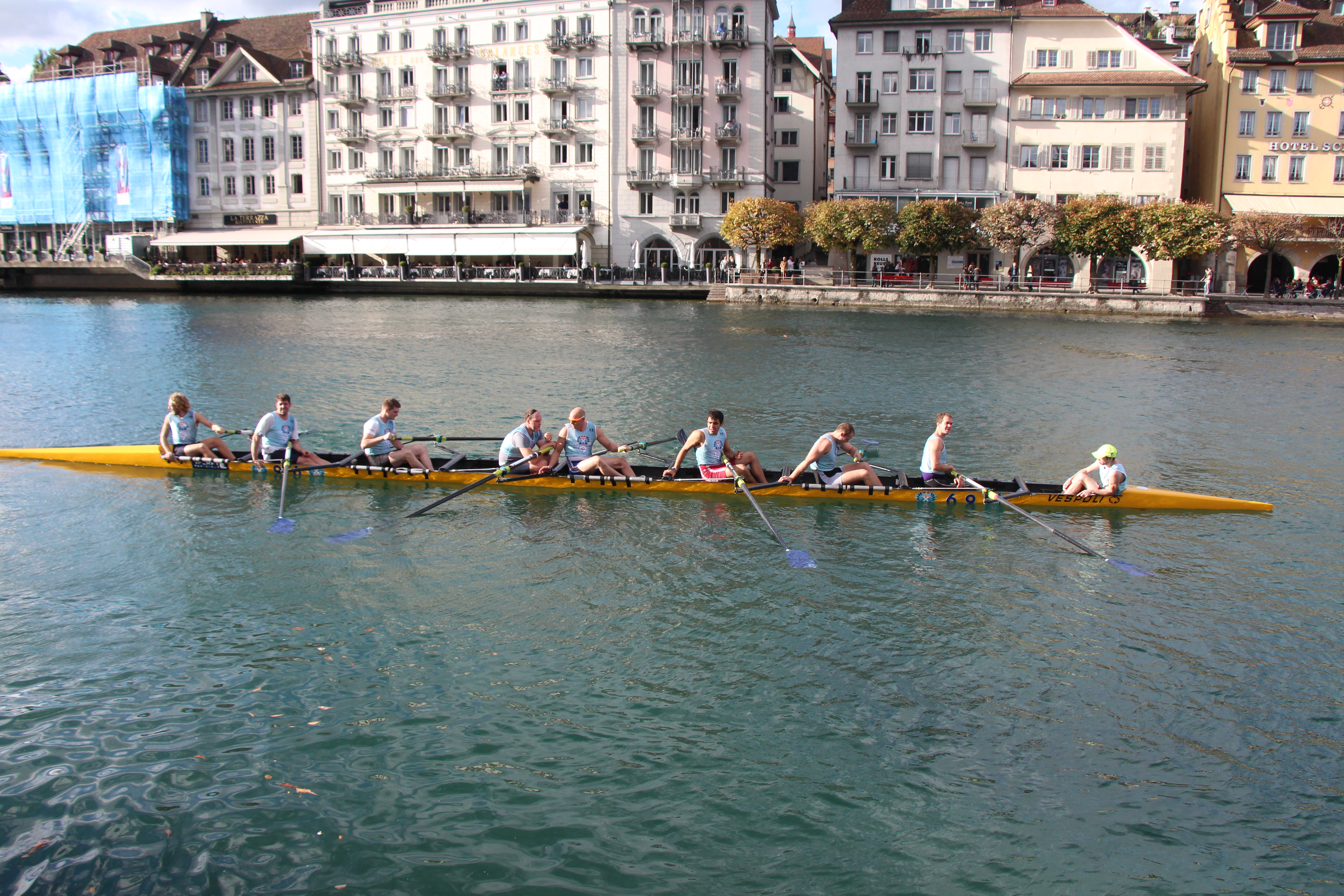
Henley Rowing Club at Red Bull X-Row 2013 finish (Jesuitenkirche)

== Honours ==
=== British champions ===
Year	Winning crew
1972	Men J18 2xc
1974	Men 4xc
1992	Women J18 1x, Women J16 4x, Women J15 4x, Women J14 4x
1993	Women J16 1x, Women J16 4x, Women J15 4x
1994	Women 2xc, Women J18 4+c, Women J16 2x, Women J15 4x, Women J14 1x, Women J14 4x
1995	Women 2xc, Women J18 2-c, Women J16 4x, Women J15 4x
1996	Women 2xc, Women J18 2xc, Women J18 4xc, Women J16 1x
1997	Men J14 2xc, Women J18 1x, Women J18 4xc, Women J18 4+, Women J14 2x, Women J14 4x+
1998	Men J15 2x, Women J16 2x, Women J16 4x
1999	Women J16 4x
2000	Men J15 2x, Women J18 4x, Women J16 4x
2001	Women J18 2x, Women J18 4x
2002	Women J16 4x, Women J15 4x+
2004	Women J18 2-, Women J16 4+
2005	Women J18 4-
2006	Women J18 4x, Women J16 4+, Women J16 4x
2008	Women J18 4c, Women J16 4x, Women J15 4x+, Women J14 4x+
2009	Women 8+c, Open J16 4+, Women J15 4x+
2010	Open L1x, Women J15 4x+, Women J14 4x+
2011	Women 8+c, Women J18 4x, Women J18 8+, Women J16 4x
2012	Open J14 4x+, Women J16 2x
2013	Women J15 4x+
2014	Women J18 4-, Women J18 8+, Women J16 4x, Women J15 4x+, Women J14 4x+
2015	Open J16 1x, Women J16 4+, Women J15 4x+
2016	Open J14 4x+, Women J16 2x, Women J16 4x, Women J14 4x+
2017	Women J18 8+, Women J15 2x, Women J15 4x+
2018	Open J18 2-, Women J18 4-, Women J18 8+, Women J16 4x
2019	Women J18 8+, Women J14 4x
2021	WJ16 4+, WJ15 2x, WJ15 4x+
2023	Women J14 4x+
2024	Open J14 4x+
2025	Open J15 4x+

Key- +coxed, -coxless, x sculls, c composite, L lightweight

=== Henley Royal Regatta ===
Year	Races won
1873	Town Challenge Cup
1878	Town Challenge Cup
2005	Thames Challenge Cup
2007	Fawley Challenge Cup
2012	Diamond Jubilee Challenge Cup

== See also ==
- Rowing on the River Thames
