= Nottinghamshire County Rowing Association =

British rowing club

Nottingham County Rowing Association
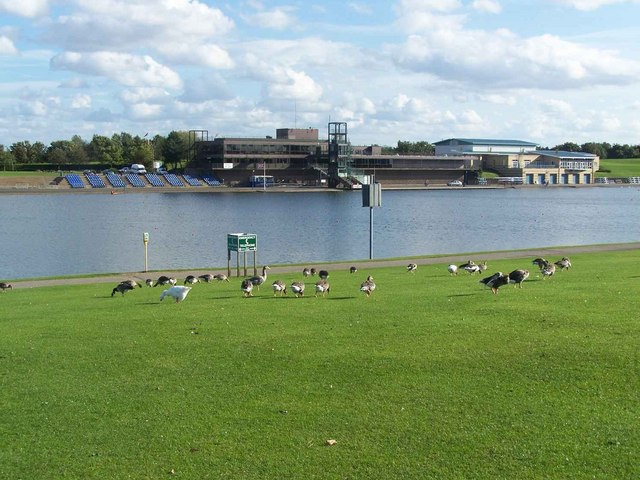

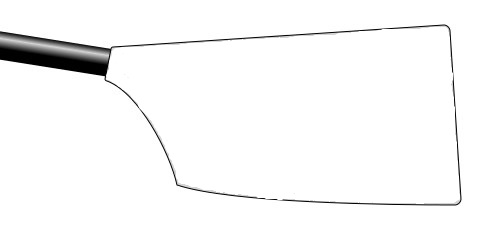
- Location: Holme Pierrepont National Watersports Centre, Nottingham, England
- Coordinates: 52.941275°N 1.091895°W
- Founded: 1981; 44 years ago
- Affiliations: British Rowing boat code - NCR
- Website: ncra.org.uk

Nottinghamshire County Rowing Association abbreviated NCRA is a rowing club based at the Holme Pierrepont National Watersports Centre in Nottingham, England.

== History ==
The club was formed in 1981 by a small group of elite rowers from the Trentside clubs in Nottingham and was supported financially by the Nottinghamshire County Council.

Competing in lime green colours, and training on the 2000m rowing course at Holme Pierrepont, NCRA crews enjoyed wins at Henley Royal Regatta and many other elite regattas. At World level, competing as Great Britain, many of the squad's athletes achieved Olympic and World Champion status. Their first international success came in the 1983 World Championships, where an NCRA lightweight coxless four won the silver medal.

In 1989, an eight from NCRA raced Harvard University in the final of the Ladies' Challenge Plate at Henley Royal Regatta. NCRA won the race, but Harvard appealed, and the race was ordered to be rerowed at the end of the day, where NCRA triumphed once more.

After 25 years of national and international success it was disbanded in 2006. In 2017 NCRA was re-formed and crews started training and racing again, based at Holme Pierrepont which resulted in almost immediate national success.

== Honours ==
=== British champions ===
| Year | Winning crew/s |
|---|---|
| 2000 | Men 8+, Women 2x |
| 2001 | Men 2x, Men 4+, Men L2-, Men L4- |
| 2002 | Men 2x, Men 4+, Men L4-, Women L4x, Men J18 1x |
| 2003 | Men 2x, Women 4-, Men J18 2x |
| 2004 | Open 2x, Open L2-, Open L4-, Open L4x |
| 2006 | Open L4- |
| 2010 | Women 8+ |
| 2018 | Women J18 2x |
| 2019 | Women J18 2- |
| 2021 | Open J15 1x |
| 2024 | W Lwt 1x |

=== Henley Royal Regatta ===
| Year | Races won |
|---|---|
| 1984 | Stewards' Challenge Cup, Wyfold Challenge Cup |
| 1987 | Wyfold Challenge Cup |
| 1988 | Wyfold Challenge Cup |
| 1989 | Ladies' Challenge Plate |
| 1990 | Thames Challenge Cup |
| 1991 | Britannia Challenge Cup |
| 1992 | Stewards' Challenge Cup, Wyfold Challenge Cup |
| 1993 | Thames Challenge Cup |
| 1994 | Wyfold Challenge Cup, Prince Philip Challenge Cup |
| 1995 | Ladies' Challenge Plate |
| 1996 | Stewards' Challenge Cup |
| 1997 | Ladies' Challenge Plate |
| 1999 | Prince Philip Challenge Cup |
| 2001 | Britannia Challenge Cup |
