= Hartpury University and College Boat Club =

University rowing club in Gloucester, UK

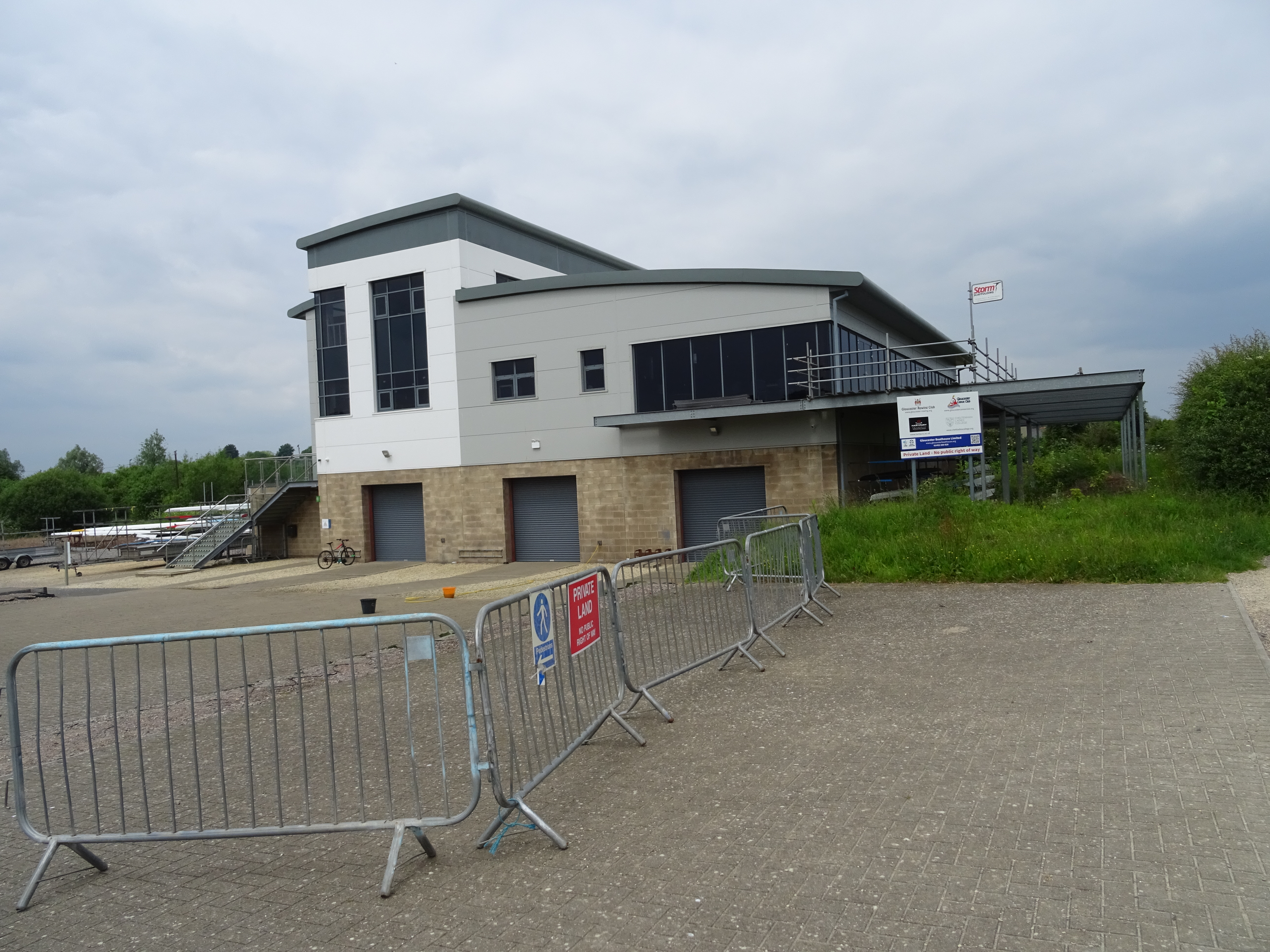

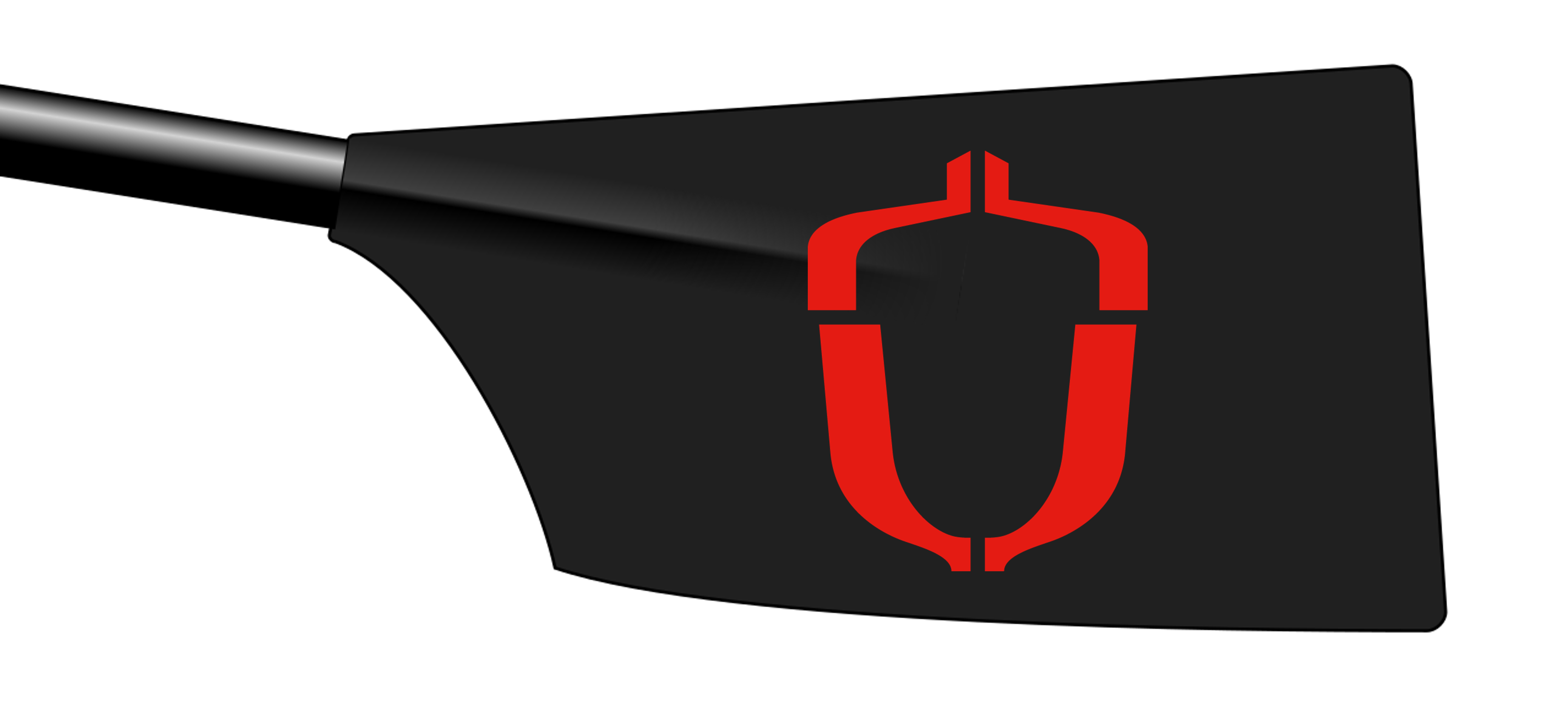
- Location: Gloucester Boathouse, David Hook Way, Gloucestershire
- Coordinates: 51.843909°N 2.267399°W
- Home water: Gloucester and Sharpness Canal
- Founded: 2012
- Affiliations: British Rowing; Boat Code - HPY
- Website: sites.google.com/view/hartpuryrowing/home

Hartpury University and College Boat Club is a rowing club on the Gloucester and Sharpness Canal, based out of Gloucester Boathouse, David Hook Way, Gloucester. The Boat Club is owned by Hartpury University and Hartpury College and is affiliated to British Rowing. The club has gained significant success including wins at the Henley Royal Regatta and has produced several Olympians in addition to multiple British and International Champions.

The club is currently run by Ben Smeeton (Head Coach), and Tom Jenkinson (Academy Lead Coach). Along with two studentship coaches.

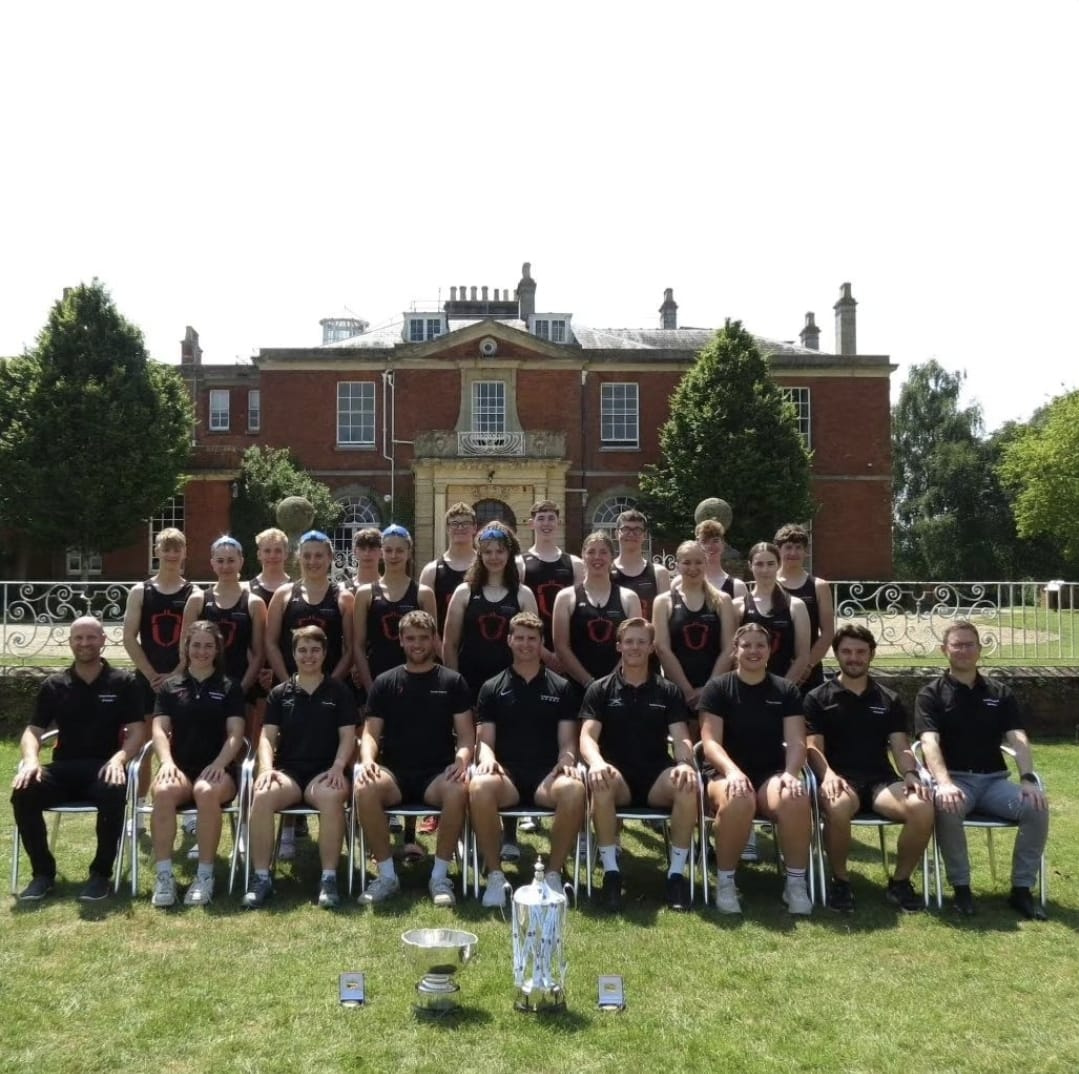

== History ==
The club was founded in 2012 as Gloucester Hartpury Rowing, in which they were partnered with Gloucester Rowing Club. The programme was created with the support of British Rowing as part of their Performance Development Academy Programme.

The club won four consecutive Diamond Jubilee Challenge Cups at the Henley Royal Regatta in 2014, 2015, 2016 and 2017.

In 2021 the club split from Gloucester RC and formed 'Hartpury University and College Boat Club', although they still share the facilities at the recently constructed £2 million Gloucester Boathouse.

== Honours ==
=== Henley Royal Regatta ===
Year	Event	Winning crew/s
2014	Diamond Jubilee Challenge Cup	Alice Bowyer, Charlotte Hodgkins-Byrne, Flo Pickles. Coach - Tom Pattichis
2015	Diamond Jubilee Challenge Cup	Frances Russell, Alice Bowyer, Charlotte Hodgkins-Byrne, Flo Pickles. Coach - Tom Pattichis
2016	Diamond Jubilee Challenge Cup	Freya Webb, Zoe Adamson, Frances Russell, Bryony Lawrence. Coach - Tom Pattichis
2017	Diamond Jubilee Challenge Cup	Hannah Cooper, Zoe Adamson, Holly Huggins, Georgia Martin. Coach - William King

=== Henley Women's Regatta ===
Year	Event	Coach
2013	The Bea Langridge Trophy.	Tom Pattichis
2014	The Bea Langridge Trophy.	Tom Pattichis
2015	The Chairman's Trophy.	Tom Pattichis
2016	Groton School Challenge Cup.	Tom Pattichis
2017	The Bea Langridge Trophy.	William King
2024	The Rosie Mayglothling Trophy.	Ben Smeeton
2024	The Rayner Cup.	Ben Smeeton
2025	The Di Ellis Trophy.	Ben Smeeton

=== National Schools Regatta ===
Year	Event	Coach
2013	ChG 4x-	Tom Pattichis
2015	ChG 1x, ChG 4x-	Tom Pattichis
2016	ChG 4-	Tom Pattichis
2019	ChG 2x.	Benjamin Jackson
2024	ChG 2x, Ch 1x, WJ16 4x-.	Ben Smeeton, Tom Jenkinson
2026	ChG 2x, Ch 2x	Ben Smeeton, Tom Jenkinson

=== British Championships ===
Year	Winning crew/s
2013	WJ18 4x-
2015	WJ18 1x, WJ18 4x-
2016	WJ18 4x-
2017	WJ18 4x-
2018	J18 8+
2019	J18 4x-, J16 1x, WJ18 1x, WJ18 2x, WJ18 4x-
2024	WJ18 1x
2025	Women J16 1x

=== British University Championships ===
Year	Winning crew/s
2024	IntG 2x

=== Course Records currently held ===
Event	Category	Year Set	Time
Junior Sculling Regatta	Ch 2x	2026	6:44.49
National Schools Regatta	Ch 1x	2024	7:08.33
National Schools Regatta	ChG 2x	2024	7:21.07

== International representation ==
Hartpury University and College Boat Club have had 92 representations for Great Britain since 2012, and a further 39 representations at The Home International Regatta. The following events have had Hartpury athletes race at:

- U19 World Rowing Championships
- U19 European Rowing Championships
- U19 Munich Regatta
- U19 Coupe De La Jeunesse
- U19 Coupe De La Jeunesse Beach Sprints
- U23 World Championships
- Home International Regatta
- Home International Beach Sprints Regatta

The Boat Club have also had alumni competing at the below events:

- U23 World Championships
- U23 European Championships
- Senior World Championships
- Tokyo 2020 Olympics
- Paris 2024 Olympics

== Notable members ==
- Chloe Brew
- Charlotte Hodgkins-Byrne
- Mathilda Hodgkins-Byrne
- Fergus Woolnough
