= 2023 British Rowing Junior Championships =

Rowing competition

- Venue: Strathclyde Country Park
- Location: Motherwell, North Lanarkshire
- Dates: 14–16 July 2023

The 2023 British Rowing Junior Championships were the 51st edition of the National Junior Championships, held from 14 to 16 July 2023 at the Strathclyde Country Park in Motherwell, North Lanarkshire.

They are organised and sanctioned by British Rowing, and are open to British junior rowers.

== Winners ==
Event	Gold	Silver	Bronze
Open J18 1x	Calpe	Tideway Scullers	Durham ARC
Open J18 2-	George Watson's	Claires Court	NCRA
Open J18 2x	Trentham	Chester-le-Street/Tyne RC	St Andrew BC
Open J18 4-	Windsor Boys'	Great Marlow School	Aberdeen Schools
Open J18 4x	Windsor Boys'	Trentham	Tees RC
Open J18 8+	Reading Blue Coat	Claires Court	NCRA/Nottingham & Union
Open J16 1x	Bewl Bridge	Grange School	Wycliffe Junior
Open J16 2-	Mediterranean	Newark RC	Durham ARC
Open J16 2x	Bewl Bridge	Kingston GS	Windsor Boys'
Open J16 4+	Reading Blue Coat	Kingston GS	NCRA/Nottingham & Union
Open J16 4x	Grange School	Kingston GS	Windsor Boys'
Open J15 1x	Trentham	Durham ARC	Tideway Scullers
Open J15 2x	Hexham	Exeter	Shanklin Sandown
Open J15 4x+	Windsor Boys'	Windsor Boys'	Wallingford RC
Open J14 1x	Hinksey	Lea	Durham ARC
Open J14 2x	Trentham	Bewl Bridge	Lea
Open J15 4x+	Windsor Boys'	Windsor Boys'	Guildford
Women J18 1x	Glasgow Academy	Kingston GS	Evesham RC
Women J18 2-	Aberdeen Schools/Strathclyde Park	Aberdeen Univ/Glasgow Univ	NCRA
Women J18 2x	William Perkin's	Evesham RC	Lea
Women J18 4x	Kingston GS	Lea	Bewl Bridge/NCRA/Peterborough/Tyne RC
Women J18 4-	Aberdeen Schools	Aberdeen Univ/Glasgow Univ/George Watson's	Aberdeen Schools
Women J18 8+	Aberdeen Schools	Kingston GS	William Perkin's
Women J16 1x	Barn Elms	Evesham RC	Doncaster SRA
Women J16 2-	Tyne RC	Hinksey	Trentham
Women J16 2x	William Perkin's	Trentham	RGS Worcester
Women J16 4+	Wallingford RC	Trentham	Tyne RC
Women J16 4x	Kingston RC	William Perkin's/Wallingford RC	Royal Chester/Trafford RC
Women J15 1x	Glasgow Academy	Lea	Calpe
Women J15 2x	Calpe	Lea	City of Bristol
Women J15 4x+	Glasgow Academy	Bradford GS/Hexham/Tyne RC	AB Severn/City of Bristol
Women J14 1x	Exeter	Glasgow RC	Henley
Women J14 2x	Cantabrigian	City of Bristol	Lambton
Women J14 4x+	Henley	Great Marlow School	City of Bristol

Key
Symbol	meaning
1, 2, 4, 8	crew size
+	coxed
-	coxless
x	sculls
14	Under-14
15	Under-15
16	Under-16
18	Under-18
