= 2016 British Rowing Junior Championships =

British rowing event

- Venue: National Water Sports Centre
- Location: Holme Pierrepont (Nottingham)
- Dates: 15–17 July 2016

The 2016 British Rowing Junior Championships were the 45th edition of the National Junior Championships, held from 15–17 July 2016 at the National Water Sports Centre in Holme Pierrepont, Nottingham. They were organised and sanctioned by British Rowing, and are open to British junior rowers.

== Medal summary ==
Event	Gold	Silver	Bronze
Victor Ludorum	Henley	n/a	n/a
Open J18 1x	Clydesdale	Broxbourne	York City
Open J18 2-	King's Canterbury	Claires Court	Great Marlow School
Open J18 2x	Claires Court	Northwich	Globe
Open J18 4-	Claires Court	King's Canterbury / King's College School	Hampton School
Open J18 4x	Leander	Lea	RGS High Wycombe
Open J18 8+	Aberdeen Schools	Hampton School	Claires Court
Open J16 1x	Maidenhead	Windsor Boys'	Minerva Bath
Open J16 2-	Tideway Scullers School	Windsor Boys'	Claires Court
Open J16 2x	Maidenhead	Calpe	Molesey
Open J16 4+	Aberdeen Schools	Tideway Scullers School	Trentham
Open J16 4x	Warrington	Globe	Abingdon School / Pangbourne College / Minerva Bath / Kingston Grammar School
Open J15 1x	Glasgow Schools	Inverness	Chester-le-Street
Open J15 2x	Lea	Marlow	Henley
Open J15 4x+	Tideway Scullers School	City of Bristol	Marlow
Open J14 4x+	Henley	AB Severn	Claires Court
Women J18 1x	Durham University	Gloucester Hartpury	Agecroft
Women J18 2-	Glasgow Schools	Gloucester Hartpury	Queen Elizabeth HS
Women J18 2x	Warrington	Norwich	Isle of Ely / Rob Roy
Women J18 4x	Gloucester Hartpury	Warrington	Isle of Ely / Rob Roy
Women J18 4-	Molesey / Shiplake Vikings	Henley	Glasgow Schools
Women J18 8+	Lady Eleanor Holles School	Nottingham	Henley
Women J16 1x	Molesey	Twickenham	Trentham
Women J16 2-	Lady Eleanor Holles School	Marlow	Chester-le-Street
Women J16 2x	Henley	Warrington	Molesey
Women J16 4+	Marlow	Henley	Great Marlow School
Women J16 4x	Henley	Strathclyde Park	Llandaff
Women J15 1x	Grange School	Isle of Ely	Tyne
Women J15 2x	Merchant Taylors' School / Trafford	Maidenhead	Trafford
Women J15 4x+	Maidenhead	Henley	Marlow
Women J14 4x+	Henley	City of Oxford	Henley

Key
Symbol	meaning
1, 2, 4, 8	crew size
+	coxed
-	coxless
x	sculls
14	Under-14
15	Under-15
16	Under-16
18	Under-18
