= 2015 British Rowing Junior Championships =

British rowing event

- Venue: Strathclyde Country Park
- Location: Motherwell, North Lanarkshire
- Dates: 18–19 July 2015

The 2015 British Rowing Junior Championships were the 44th edition of the National Junior Championships, held from 18 to 19 July 2015 at the Strathclyde Country Park in Motherwell, North Lanarkshire. They were organised and sanctioned by British Rowing, and are open to British junior rowers.

== Medal summary ==
Event	Gold	Silver	Bronze
Victor Ludorum	Maidenhead	Claires Court	n/a
Open J18 1x	Nottingham	Leander	Mossbourne
Open J18 2-	Thames	Great Marlow School	Shiplake Vikings
Open J18 2x	Glasgow Academy	Claires Court	Huntingdon / St Neots
Open J18 4-	King's Canterbury	Aberdeen Schools	Claires Court
Open J18 4x	Northwich	RGS High Wycombe	Norwich
Open J18 8+	Claires Court	George Watson's	Aberdeen Schools
Open J16 1x	Henley	Marlow	Clydesdale
Open J16 2-	Abingdon School	Chester-le-Street	Glasgow Schools
Open J16 2x	Windsor Boys'	Leander	Globe
Open J16 4+	Claires Court	Northwich	George Watson's
Open J16 4x	Lea	City of Oxford	Weybridge
Open J15 1x	Maidenhead	Wallingford	Aberdeen Schools
Open J15 2x	Calpe	AB Severn	Talkin Tarn / Tyne United
Open J15 4x+	Windsor Boys'	Great Marlow School	RGS High Wycombe
Open J14 1x	Walton	York City	Lea
Open J14 1x	Chester-le-Street	Globe	Warrington
Open J14 4x+	City of Bristol	Claires Court	Aberdeen Schools
Women J18 1x	Gloucester Hartpury E	Gloucester Hartpury A	Nottingham
Women J18 2-	Queen Elizabeth HS	Norwich	Weybridge
Women J18 2x	Weybridge	AB Severn	Gloucester Hartpury
Women J18 4x	Gloucester Hartpury / Reading	Shiplake Vikings	Durham
Women J18 4-	Shiplake Vikings	Weybridge	Queen Elizabeth HS
Women J18 8+	Lady Eleanor Holles School	Globe / Mossbourne	Henley
Women J16 1x	Durham	Avon County	City of Oxford
Women J16 2-	Aberdeen Schools	Glasgow Academy	Lady Eleanor Holles School
Women J16 2x	Maidenhead	Norwich	Isle of Ely
Women J16 4+	Henley	Great Marlow School	Hereford / Ross
Women J16 4x	Isle of Ely / Reading	Avon County	Norwich
Women J15 1x	Exeter	Globe	York City
Women J15 2x	Avon County	Isle of Ely / Reading	Trentham
Women J15 4x+	Henley	Maidenhead	Ross
Women J14 1x	Exeter	Boston	Tyne
Women J14 2x	Merchant Taylors' School	Lady Eleanor Holles School	Lea
Women J14 4x+	Maidenhead	Trentham	Eton Excelsior

Key
Symbol	meaning
1, 2, 4, 8	crew size
+	coxed
-	coxless
x	sculls
14	Under-14
15	Under-15
16	Under-16
18	Under-18
