= 2019 British Rowing Junior Championships =

British rowing event

- Venue: National Water Sports Centre
- Location: Holme Pierrepont (Nottingham)
- Dates: 19–21 July 2019

The 2019 British Rowing Junior Championships were the 48th edition of the National Junior Championships, held from 19–21 July 2019 at the National Water Sports Centre in Holme Pierrepont, Nottingham. They are organised and sanctioned by British Rowing, and are open to British junior rowers.

== Winners ==
Event	Gold	Silver	Bronze
Open J18 1x	Rob Roy	Claires Court	Gloucester Hartpury
Open J18 2-	King's Canterbury	Claires Court	Weybridge
Open J18 2x	Claires Court	Rob Roy	Gloucester Hartpury
Open J18 4-	Aberdeen Schools	Walton	Henley
Open J18 4x	Gloucester Hartpury	Clydesdale	Henley
Open J18 8+	Aberdeen Schools	Walton / Tideway Scullers School	Cantabrigian
Open J16 1x	Gloucester Hartpury	Talkin Tarn	Christchurch
Open J16 2-	King's Canterbury	Aberdeen Schools	Eton College
Open J16 2x	Exeter	Lea	Chester-le-Street
Open J16 4+	Aberdeen Schools	Eton College / Aberdeen Schools	Walton
Open J16 4x	Tideway Scullers School	Lea	Wallingford
Open J15 1x	Gloucester	Runcorn	Walton
Open J15 2x	Maidenhead	Shanklin Sandown	George Watson's
Open J15 4x+	Windsor Boys'	Trentham	Grange School
Open J14 4x+	Trentham	Shiplake College	Nottingham & Union
Women J18 1x	Gloucester Hartpury	Cambois	Yarm School
Women J18 2-	NCRA	Yarm School	Glasgow Academy
Women J18 2x	Gloucester Hartpury	Sudbury	NCRA
Women J18 4x	Gloucester Hartpury	Sir William Perkins's School	George Watson's / Loch Lomond / Strathclyde Park
Women J18 4-	Inverness / Loch Lomond / St Andrew	NCRA	Glasgow Academy
Women J18 8+	Henley	Lea	Wallingford
Women J16 1x	Maidenhead	Nottingham & Union	York City
Women J16 2-	Marlow	Trentham	Walton
Women J16 2x	Sir William Perkins's School	Nottingham & Union	Kingston Grammar School
Women J16 4+	Marlow	Lea	Henley
Women J16 4x	Isle of Ely / Rob Roy	Henley	Wallingford
Women J15 1x	Tideway Scullers School	Grange School	Cambridge '99
Women J15 2x	Maidenhead	Nottingham & Union	Wycliffe Junior
Women J15 4x+	Trentham	Henley	Trafford
Women J14 4x	Henley	Nottingham & Union	Chester-le-Street / Durham

Key
Symbol	meaning
1, 2, 4, 8	crew size
+	coxed
-	coxless
x	sculls
14	Under-14
15	Under-15
16	Under-16
18	Under-18
