= 2017 British Rowing Junior Championships =

British rowing event

- Venue: National Water Sports Centre
- Location: Holme Pierrepont (Nottingham)
- Dates: 14–16 July 2017

The 2017 British Rowing Junior Championships were the 46th edition of the National Junior Championships, held from 14 to 16 July 2017 at the National Water Sports Centre in Holme Pierrepont, Nottingham. They were organised and sanctioned by British Rowing, and are open to British junior rowers.

== Medal summary ==
Event	Gold	Silver	Bronze
Victor Ludorum	Henley	n/a	n/a
Open J18 1x	Tideway Scullers School	St Andrew	Nottingham
Open J18 2-	Tideway Scullers School	Llandaff	Marlow
Open J18 2x	Leander	Chester-le-Street	Calpe
Open J18 4-	Hampton School	Windsor Boys'	Great Marlow School
Open J18 4x	Leander	Lea	Warrington
Open J18 8+	Hampton School	Tideway Scullers School	Gloucester Hartpury
Open J16 1x	Glasgow Academy	Hollingworth Lake	City of Bristol
Open J16 2-	Walton	Wallingford	Northwich
Open J16 2x	Lea	Falcon	Twickenham / Reading
Open J16 4+	Marlow	Aberdeen Schools	Walton
Open J16 4x	Monmouth Comprehensive School	Tideway Scullers School	Walton
Open J15 1x	Globe	Trentham	Rob Roy
Open J15 2x	Leander	Henley	Peterborough City
Open J15 4x+	William Borlase	Windsor Boys'	Henley
Open J14 4x+	Trentham	Durham School / Talkin Tarn / Chester-le-Street	City of Bristol
Women J18 1x	Agecroft	Mossbourne	Strathclyde Park
Women J18 2-	Lady Eleanor Holles School A	Glasgow Academy	Lady Eleanor Holles School B
Women J18 2x	Isle of Ely	Marlow	Chester-le-Street
Women J18 4x	Gloucester Hartpury	Henley	Castle Semple
Women J18 4-	Glasgow Academy	Henley	Lady Eleanor Holles School
Women J18 8+	Henley	NCRA	Tideway Scullers School / St Paul's Girls' School
Women J16 1x	Cambridge '99	Lady Eleanor Holles School	Llandaff
Women J16 2-	Aberdeen Schools	Marlow	Glasgow Academy
Women J16 2x	Northwich	Sir William Perkin's School	Inverness
Women J16 4+	Lea	Aberdeen Schools	Great Marlow School
Women J16 4x	King's Ely / Isle of Ely / Cambridge '99	Warrington / Northwich	Tideway Scullers School
Women J15 1x	Exeter	George Watson's	Tideway Scullers School
Women J15 2x	Henley	Maidenhead	City of Bristol
Women J15 4x+	Henley	Tideway Scullers School	Maidenhead
Women J14 4x	Marlow	AB Severn	Reading

Key
Symbol	meaning
1, 2, 4, 8	crew size
+	coxed
-	coxless
x	sculls
14	Under-14
15	Under-15
16	Under-16
18	Under-18
