= 2024 British Rowing Championships =

British rowing event

- Venue: National Water Sports Centre
- Location: Holme Pierrepont (Nottingham)
- Dates: 19–22 July 2024

The 2024 British Rowing Championships were the 2024 edition of the National Senior and Junior Championships, held from 19 to 22 July 2024 at the National Water Sports Centre in Holme Pierrepont, Nottingham. They were organised and sanctioned by British Rowing, and were open to British rowers. The senior championships were held for the first time since 2018. This was also notably the first time since 2012 that the championships were combined.

== Senior ==
=== Medal summary ===
Event	Gold	Silver	Bronze
Open club 1x	Lea RC	Hereford RC	NCRA
Open Lwt 1x	Clydesdale ARC	Bath Univ	Kingston RC
Open club 2-	Derby RC	NCRA	Aberdeen SRA
Open 2x	Reading Univ	Glasgow Univ / Stirling RC	Windsor Boys' / Windsorian RC
Open club 4+	Hereford RC	Nottingham RC	Auriol Kensington
Open club 4x-	Derby RC	London RC	Shoreham RC
Open 4-	Thames RC	Derby RC / Oxford Brookes	Hinksey Sc Sch
Open club 4-	Derby RC	Kingston GS	Northampton RC
Open club 8+	Star Club	Hereford RC	Dart Totnes ARC
Women club 1x	London RC	Hartpury Univ & College BC	Nottingham RC
Women Lwt 1x	NCRA	Surrey Univ	Derby RC
Women club 2-	Leicester RC	NCRA	Calpe RC
Women 2x	Bath Univ	Hartpury Univ & College BC	Cambridge Univ / Oxford Univ
Women club 4+	Cambridge Univ	Thames RC	Surrey Univ
Women club 4x-	Nottingham RC	NCRA	Warrington RC
Women 4-	Thames RC	Cambridge Univ	Thames RC
Women club 4-	Nottingham RC	NCRA	Kingston GS
Women club 8+	Cambridge Univ	Cambridge Univ	Northwich RC
Mixed 4+	Sudbury RC	Claires Court	Nottingham RC
Mixed 8+	Thames RC	Thames RC	Hinksey Sc Sch

== Junior ==
=== Medal summary ===
Event	Gold	Silver	Bronze
Open J18 1x	Hinksey Sc Sch	George Watson's	Shanklin Sandown
Open J18 2-	Hinksey Sc Sch	Windsor Boys'	Aberdeen SRA
Open J18 2x	Lea RC	Hartpury Univ & College BC	Bewl Bridge RC
Open J18 4-	Hinksey Sc Sch	Aberdeen SRA	Windsor Boys'
Open J18 4x-	Lea RC	Hartpury Univ & College BC	RGS High Wycombe
Open J18 8+	Reading Blue Coat	Claires Court	Maidenhead RC
Open J16 1x	Shanklin Sandown	George Watson's	St Paul's Sch
Open J16 2-	Claires Court	Wallingford RC	Aberdeen SRA
Open J16 2x	Shanklin Sandown	Exeter RC	Hinksey Sc Sch
Open J16 4+	Reading Blue Coat	Windsor Boys'	Claires Court
Open J16 4x-	Windsor Boys'	Kingston RC	Hinksey Sc Sch
Open J15 1x	Durham ARC	Hinksey Sc Sch	George Watson's
Open J15 2x	Exeter RC / Hexham RC	Hereford RC	Walbrook RC
Open J15 4x+	Walbrook RC	Windsor Boys'	Windsor Boys'
Open J14 1x	George Watson's	Bedford RC	Berwick ARC
Open J14 2x	George Watson's	Marlow RC	Bedford RC
Open J14 4x+	Henley RC	Falcon RC	Brentford
Women J18 1x	Hartpury Univ & College BC	Lea RC	Northampton RC
Women J18 2-	W Perkin's Sch	Walton RC	Wallingford RC
Women J18 2x	Lea RC	Trentham BC	Lea RC
Women J18 4-	Tyne RC	Wallingford RC	Aberdeen SRA
Women J18 4x-	Marlow RC	Rob Roy BC	Lea RC
Women J18 8+	Wallingford RC	W Perkin's Sch	Marlow RC
Women J16 1x	Barn Elms RC	Warrington RC	A B Severn RC
Women J16 2x	AB Severn RC	Tideway Sc Sch	Calpe RC
Women J16 2-	Calpe RC	Glasgow Academy	Marlow RC
Women J16 4+	Glasgow Academy	Wallingford RC	Gt Marlow Sch
Women J16 4x-	Wallingford RC	Hexham RC	Hartpury Univ & College BC
Women J15 1x	AB Severn RC	Glasgow RC	City of Sunderland
Women J15 2x	Cantabrigian	Calpe RC	Hereford RC
Women J15 4x+	Clydesdale ARC / Strathclyde Pk	Trent RC	Nottm & Union
Women J14 1x	Cambois RC	NCRA	Bewl Bridge RC
Women J14 2x	Trent RC	Henley RC	City of Bristol
Women J14 4x+	City of Bristol	Marlow RC	Henley RC

=== Key ===
Symbol	meaning
1, 2, 4, 8	crew size
+	coxed
-	coxless
x	sculls
14	Under-14
15	Under-15
16	Under-16
J	Junior
Lwt	Lightweight

== Victor Ludorum ==
The Victor Ludorum is an award given to the best performing clubs across the championships. This is measured by how clubs place in A finals, as they collect points by doing so.Wallingford RC won the overall and junior Victor Ludorum for the first time in their history.

=== Award Summary ===
Award	1st	2nd	3rd
Junior	Wallingford RC	Marlow RC	Winsor Boys'
Senior	Thames RC	Bath University BC	Cambridge University BC
Overall	Wallingford RC	Marlow RC	Windsor Boys'
