= USBC =

USBC may refer to:

- United States Ballroom Championships, now the United States Dance Championships
- United States Bankruptcy Code
- United States Bankruptcy Court
- United States Barista Championship
- United States Bowling Congress
- The United States Bridge Championship, organised by the United States Bridge Federation
- University of Surrey Boat Club, England
- USB-C connector for electronic devices

== See also ==
- United States Barber coinage
- United States Bureau of the Census
