= Diamond Jubilee Challenge Cup =

British speedway rider

- Venue: Henley Royal Regatta, River Thames
- Location: Henley-on-Thames, Oxfordshire
- Dates: 2012 – present

Diamond Jubilee Challenge Cup is a rowing event for women's junior quadruple sculls at the annual Henley Royal Regatta on the River Thames at Henley-on-Thames in England.

The event is open to crews from any one club or school where no sculler will have attained her 18th birthday before the first day of September preceding the event. It was inaugurated in 2012.

== Past winners ==
Year	Winner	Runner-Up	Ref
2012	Henley Rowing Club	Canford School Boat Club	
2013	Latymer Upper School Boat Club	Headington School Oxford Boat Club	
2014	Gloucester Rowing Club (& Hartpury)	Marlow Rowing Club	
2015	Gloucester Rowing Club (& Hartpury)	Marlow Rowing Club	
2016	Gloucester Rowing Club (& Hartpury)	Headington School Oxford Boat Club	
2017	Gloucester Rowing Club (& Hartpury)	Isle of Ely Rowing Club	
2018	Y Quad Cities Rowing Association, USA	Marlow Rowing Club	
2019	Latymer Upper School Boat Club	Headington School Oxford Boat Club	
2020	No competition due to COVID-19 pandemic		
2021	Shiplake College Boat Club	Marlow Rowing Club	
2022	Claires Court School Boat Club	Redwood Scullers, USA	
2023	Tideway Scullers School	Wycliffe Junior Rowing Club	
2024	Wycliffe College Boat Club	Marlow Rowing Club	
2025	Wycliffe College Boat Club	Marlow Rowing Club	
2026	Marlow Rowing Club	Tideway Scullers School	
