= Union of UEA Students =

Students' union of the University of East Anglia

UEA Students' Union
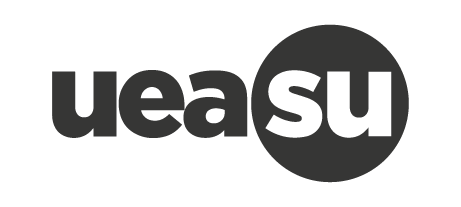
- Institution: University of East Anglia
- Location: Union House, University of East Anglia
- Established: 1969
- Affiliations: National Union of Students
- Website: http://www.ueasu.org

The University of East Anglia Students' Union is the students' union of the University of East Anglia in the United Kingdom. All students of the university and some INTO UEA students automatically become members of the Union, but do have the right to opt out of membership. Membership grants the ability to take part in the Union's activities such as Clubs and Societies, and being involved in the democratic processes of the Union. The Union is a democratic organisation run by its members via an elected student officer committee and student council. It is affiliated to the National Union of Students. The Union follows its constitution and its policies. in order to fulfill its purpose 'to enrich the life of every UEA student.'

== Democratic structure ==
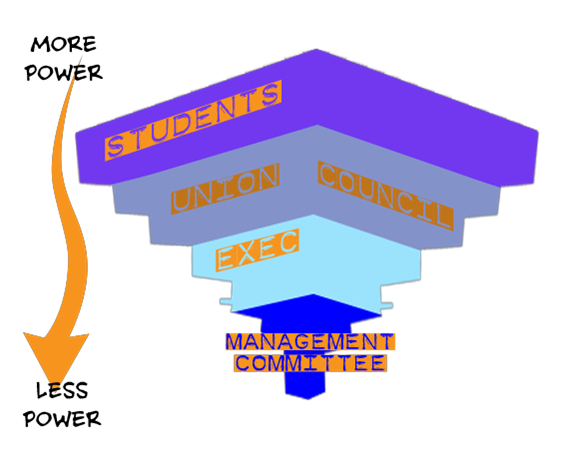
Democratic Structures of the Union of UEA Students

=== Union Council ===
The Union Council, whose members are elected student representatives from each year of every school of the university and the clubs and societies of the Union, in addition to the student officer committee, meets a minimum of eight times a year and sets the policy of the Union and confirms the actions of the Student Officer Committee. The decisions of the Union Council may only be overturned by a ballot of all members of the Union, or by the Union's trustee board in the case of certain decisions, normally where the legal implications are more serious.

=== Referendums ===
The decisions of the Union Council may only be overturned by a ballot of all members of the union. A referendum may be called by the Student Officer Committee, by the Union Council, or by a petition of 500 members (1/30 of the membership). The question must be balanced and is approved by Union Council. Every member may vote in a referendum - a straightforward majority will set new policy for the union. Policy passed by referendum cannot be overturned except by another referendum, although as with all union policy it is considered lapsed after two academic years. A referendum can be called for any reason, not only in response to a decision of the Union Council.

=== Student Officer Committee ===
The members of the Union elect annually a Student Officer Committee of five full-time sabbatical officers and thirteen non-sabbatical officers. The Union does not currently have a post of "President" on the Student Officer Committee.

The full-time officers meet all year round in a Management Committee to decide on day-to-day operational matters relating to the Union and its subsidiary companies (these officers also serving as five of the six directors of those companies). The Student Officer Committee meets during the university semesters and is responsible for ensuring the policy of the Union (as defined by the Union Council or policy ballot) is adhered to. It also controls the campaigns budget of the Union, which in 2014/15 was in excess of £20,000.

== Campaigns ==
The Union campaigns on a wide range of issues, as directed by the democratic processes. Recent campaigns have included actions on free education for all, transport and a change to the graduation venue.

The Union has four autonomous liberations campaigns, black and ethnic minorities, disabled, LGBT+ and women's. These are each led by a campaign convenor who is elected by self defining students.

In December 2010, the Union Council decided that The Daily Telegraph and The Daily Mail and would now only be sold under the counter in Union owned shops in response to their name and shame campaign of seemingly random students at the Millbank Student Protests. The Daily Express was added to the list by accident.

Over the 2011/12 academic year, there was a sizable campaign, supported by the Union of UEA Students, on the UEA campus to save the School of Music from closure. Although ultimately unsuccessful, the campaign saw hundreds of students end demonstrations, fundraisers and rallies against the closure.

From 2011, UEA students, including many members of the student society People & Planet organised an anti-sweatshop campaign, calling on the university to affiliate to the Worker Rights Consortium. After a three-year campaign, including mass petitioning, banner drops and a mass nearly naked protest, the university agreed to affiliate to the WRC in November 2014.

In late 2013, the union council voted to hold a campus-wide referendum asking students whether they wanted Blurred Lines banned from campus. The referendum resulted in a 75% no vote, one of few unions not to ban the song from its campus.

2013 also saw the launch of the Fossil Free campaign, as part of an international initiative to lobby public institutions to divest from the fossil fuel industry. The campaign has seen five universities in the UK remove their investments from such companies, but as of yet UEA has refused to end any of its investments. This is in spite of 1,000 students signing a petition in support of the campaign, 95 academics signing an open letter calling for divestment and a series of high-profile stunts and actions organised by the Student Union and the Fossil Free campaign group.

== Membership services ==
The Union provides a professional advice centre, and funding for clubs and societies. In addition to this, a key function of the Union is to be an independent expert voice of students, and as such provides and supports representation of its members on University Committees.

=== Representation ===
Led by the Undergraduate and Postgraduate Education officers, the Union supports 399 student representatives (2010/11) to help represent their course mates to the university on issues relating to education and the student experience.

=== Advice centre ===
The Union provides a professional advice centre that is available for all UEA students free of charge. The advice workers can provide help and support in many areas of student life. They often deal with academic appeals, financial problems, welfare issues such as accommodation on campus, a housing bureau which includes a tenancy agreement checking service, and personal issues.

=== Sports clubs ===
The Union runs around 60 Sports clubs. Over 350,000 is spent on sport by the Union every year and this is supplemented by around 100,000 a year from the fee that a student pays for Sports Association Membership. This membership is a once per year membership of £50 which entitles the member access to any of the Unions' Clubs, who will then charge a membership fee starting from £5 which pays for things like training, coaching, affiliation to BUCS and insurance for the member. The university Sportspark provides facilities for UEA Sports Clubs in line with its Community Usage agreement.

Notable Unions clubs include University of East Anglia Boat Club, UEA Sailing Club, achieving first place at BUCS yachting in 2025 and very good results at other events, UEA Lacrosse Club, and the UEA Blue Sox, one of the first baseball and softball university clubs in Britain.

=== Societies ===
The Union runs and supports over 200 societies on a huge range of issues, hobbies and interests. access to societies is currently free, but societies charge an individual membership fee starting from £3 per academic year.

The Union welcomes new clubs and societies when they fulfil a need for students, and are not replicating what is already provided by an existing club or society. All clubs and Societies are run by elected students, and have a committee that will at least consist of a president, secretary, treasurer and Union Council Representative. There are also Sports and Societies Councils where the Union delegates a great deal of power over spending of the relevant budgets to the presidents of those clubs and societies.

=== Volunteering ===
This year the Union set up and successfully ran the first year of Union Volunteers, and accredited 80 volunteers. The scheme is a programme to try and reward all the volunteers who already work in the Union. With over 1500 club and society committee members, 399 student reps, an average of about 75 Union Councillors, part-time student officers and currently unknown amount of other volunteering, the Union hopes to develop this hugely in 11/12.

=== Peer support groups ===
- Umbrella (previously UEAchronic)
- UEA Pride (LGBT support group)
- Nightline
- UEA Minds
- Sexual Assault Awareness Campaign (SAAC)

== Commercial services ==
The Union operates many of the services open to all members of the university community and the general public on the university campus in Norwich including:

- BarSU
- The Nick Rayns LCR
- The Waterfront, a gig venue/club in Norwich city centre

It was announced during August 2020 that the ShopSU, UNIO, and food sales at BarSU would be taken over by UEA management in exchange for a bailout loan.

== Controversies ==
The UEA Students' Union was given a red rating by Spiked in its recent "free speech" rankings of universities. The publication accused the SU of having banned and actively censored ideas and free speech on campus. Instances cited include the cancellation of a meeting with a UKIP candidate, the removal of clothing that was seen by the SU as contravening their stance on cultural appropriation as well as the boycotting of various newspapers. The SU have also made headlines after banning the university Rugby team and temporarily suspending some members of the Hockey team.
