= The Grange School, Northwich =

The Grange School

Location
- Bradburns Lane; Hartford; Northwich, Cheshire, CW8 1LU; England; 53.245°N 2.549°W

Information
- Type: Private day school
- Motto: Latin: E Glande Robur ('From an acorn, an oak')
- Established: 1933 / 1978
- Local authority: Cheshire West and Chester
- Chair of Governors: Trevor Brocklebank
- Head: Lorraine Earps
- Staff: 358
- Gender: Co-educational
- Age: 1 to 18
- Enrolment: 1217
- Houses: Bollin; Dane; Gowy; Weaver
- Colours: Green, Teal and Grey
- Publication: The Roburian
- Head of the Junior School: Ben Tagg
- Affiliation: HMC
- Former pupils: Old Roburians
- School Hymn: Praise, my soul, the King of Heaven
- Website: http://www.grange.org.uk

The Grange School is an academically selective private day school near Northwich, Cheshire, England, a member of the Headmasters' and Headmistresses' Conference.

Founded in 1933 as a preparatory school, in 1978 the school made the unusual progression to the opening of a secondary school and now teaches pupils of all school ages.

The school is divided across two sites; the Junior School and the Senior School and Sixth Form. The Junior school has six forms, for National Curriculum Years 1 to 6, as well as a Reception class. The senior school has First, Second, Third, Fourth and Fifth Forms, for Years 7 to 11, plus a Lower and Upper Sixth Form for Years 12 and 13.

The Junior School is in Beechwood Avenue, Hartford, near Northwich, the Senior School in Bradburns Lane, Hartford. The school has its own theatre, built in 2005 as part of the Senior School campus and named the Grange Theatre. It can be hired for community and conference use. The school also has a £6m purpose-built Sport Centre that is used by the school and the Hartford community.

Extra-curricular activities include music, drama, rowing with the Grange School Rowing Club, and a Duke of Edinburgh's Award scheme. There is also a Community Service programme and the school has had a link with a school in the Gambia for many years.

In 2023 there were 157 pupils in the school's Sixth Form. Almost all school leavers progress to higher education. Former pupils are called Old Roburians, from the school's Latin motto, E Glande Robur, meaning "from an acorn, an oak".
