= Sudbury Rowing Club =

English Rowing club

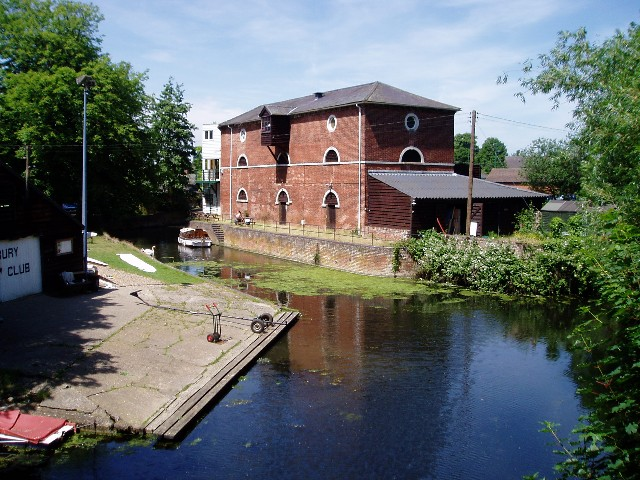

- The landing stage can be seen on the left hand side
- Location: Quay Lane, Sudbury, Suffolk, CO10 2AN, England
- Coordinates: 52°02′03″N 0°43′43″E
- Home water: River Stour, Suffolk
- Founded: 1869
- Affiliations: British Rowing boat code - SRC
- Website: sudburyrowingclub.org.uk

Events
- Sudbury International Regatta (August)

Sudbury Rowing Club formerly the Stour Boat Club is a rowing club based in Sudbury, Suffolk, England. The home water is on the River Stour, Suffolk.

== History ==
The club was formed in 1869, when the boat races held on the Stour featured a newly established club by the name of Stour Boat Club. Another club called the Sudbury Boat Club (known as the yellow and blacks) was formed in 1867 but was short lived, although to confuse matters throughout the years the Stour Boat Club was frequently referred to as the Sudbury Boat Club.

In May 1883, the Stour Boat Club reformed at a meeting at the Anchor Hotel.

In 1923 The Deuchar Cup (a championship of Suffolk and Norfolk) was inaugurated in 1923 and in 1926 the club admitted women for the first time.

On 26 July 1931, the boathouse burned down. A subsequent insurance claim £762 helped rebuild the boathouse, which was opened by the Mayoress on 16 March 1932. When the Sudbury Town F.C. purchased Priory Meadow, they gifted the rowing club part of the land that included the Boathouse site, which had previously been leased.

In December 1975 the club officially change its name from the Stour Boat Club to the Sudbury Rowing Club.

A new clubhouse was opened on 29 May 1999 as part of the club's 125th anniversary, with help from the National Lottery.

In 2024 the club produced British champions.

== Honours ==
=== British champions ===
Year	Winning crew/s
2024	Mixed 4+
