= Lady Eleanor Holles School Boat Club =

British rowing club

Lady Eleanor Holles Boat Club
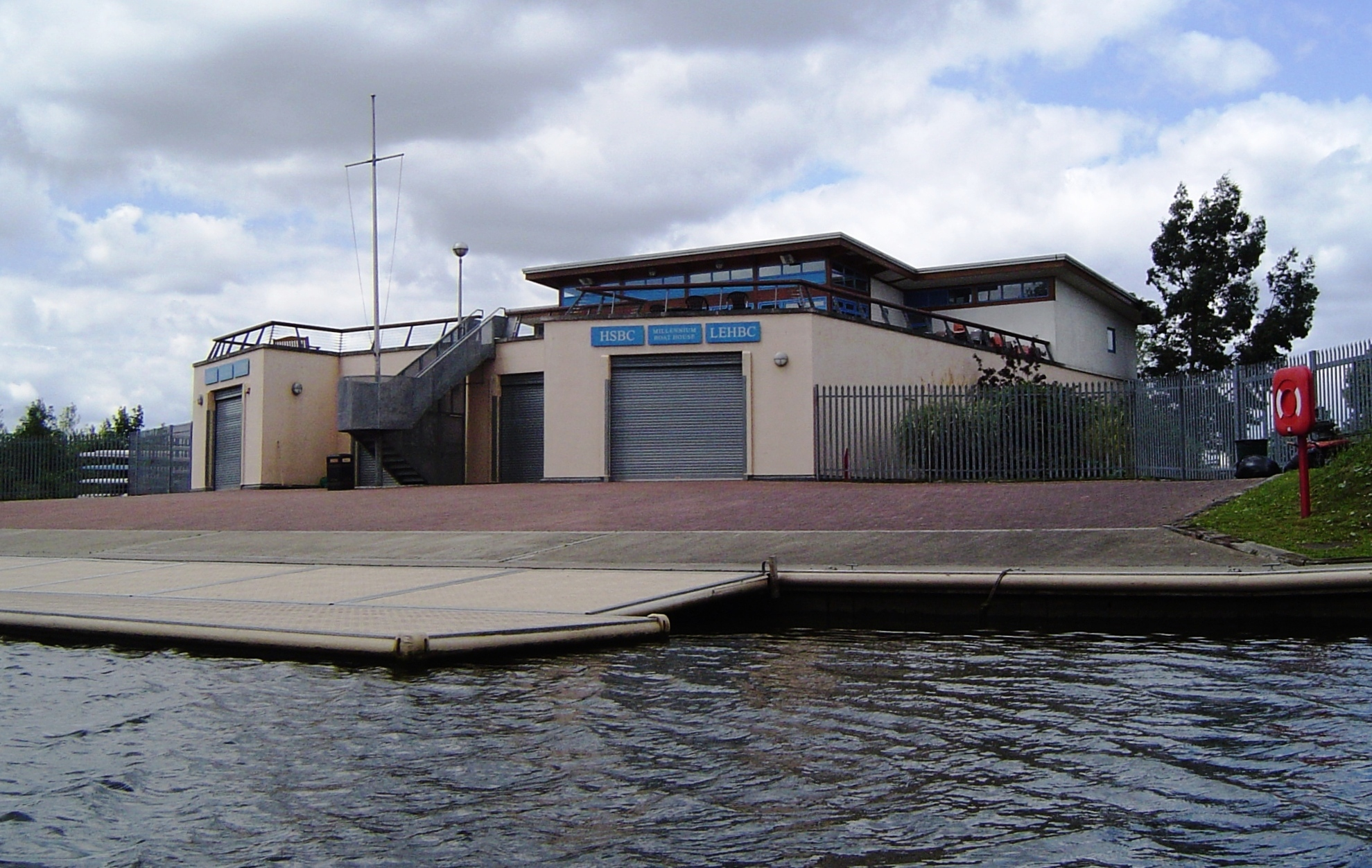

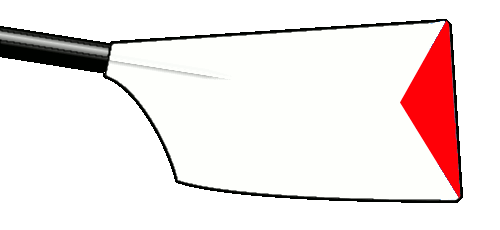
- Location: Millennium Boat House, Lower Sunbury Road, Hampton, London
- Coordinates: 51.409764°N 0.375114°W
- Affiliations: British Rowing (boat code LEH)
- Website: www.lehs.org.uk/about/location-and-transport/millennium-boat-house

Lady Eleanor Holles Boat Club is a rowing club on the River Thames, based at the Millennium Boat House, Lower Sunbury Road, Hampton, London. The club belongs to Lady Eleanor Holles School.

== History ==
In 2000 the club's Millennium Boathouse was opened 2 km upstream from Molesey weir, close to the upstream end of Platts Eyot. The land it was built on was originally owned by Thames Water and construction of the boathouse was a joint project with the Hampton School Boat Club and the two schools form the Hampton and the Holles Boat Club Association. In 2000 the boathouse was opened by Sir Steve Redgrave and Ann Redgrave.

The club has produced multiple British champions.

== Honours ==
=== British champions ===
Year	Winning crew/s
1987	Women J16 4x+
1988	Women J14 2x
1990	Women J16 4+, Women J14 2x, Women J14 4x
1991	Women J16 8+, Women J14 1x
1995	Women J14 4x
1996	Women J14 4x
1997	Women J16 8
1998	Women J16 4+
1999	Women 4-, Women 4+, Women J14 1x
2000	Women J14 1x
2001	Women 2-
2003	Women 4x
2006	Women J15 4x+, Women J14 1x, Women J14 4x+
2007	Women J16 4+
2008	Women J18 4+
2009	Women 4-, Women 8+, Women J16 4+
2010	Women 8+
2011	Women J18 4+
2015	Women J18 8+
2016	Women J18 8+, Women J16 2-
2017	Women J18 2-

=== National Schools' Regatta ===
Year	Winning crew
2007	The Aylings Challenge Cup
2019	The Aylings Challenge Cup
2021	The Aylings Challenge Cup
