= Samantha Redgrave =

British rower (born 1994)

Sam Redgrave
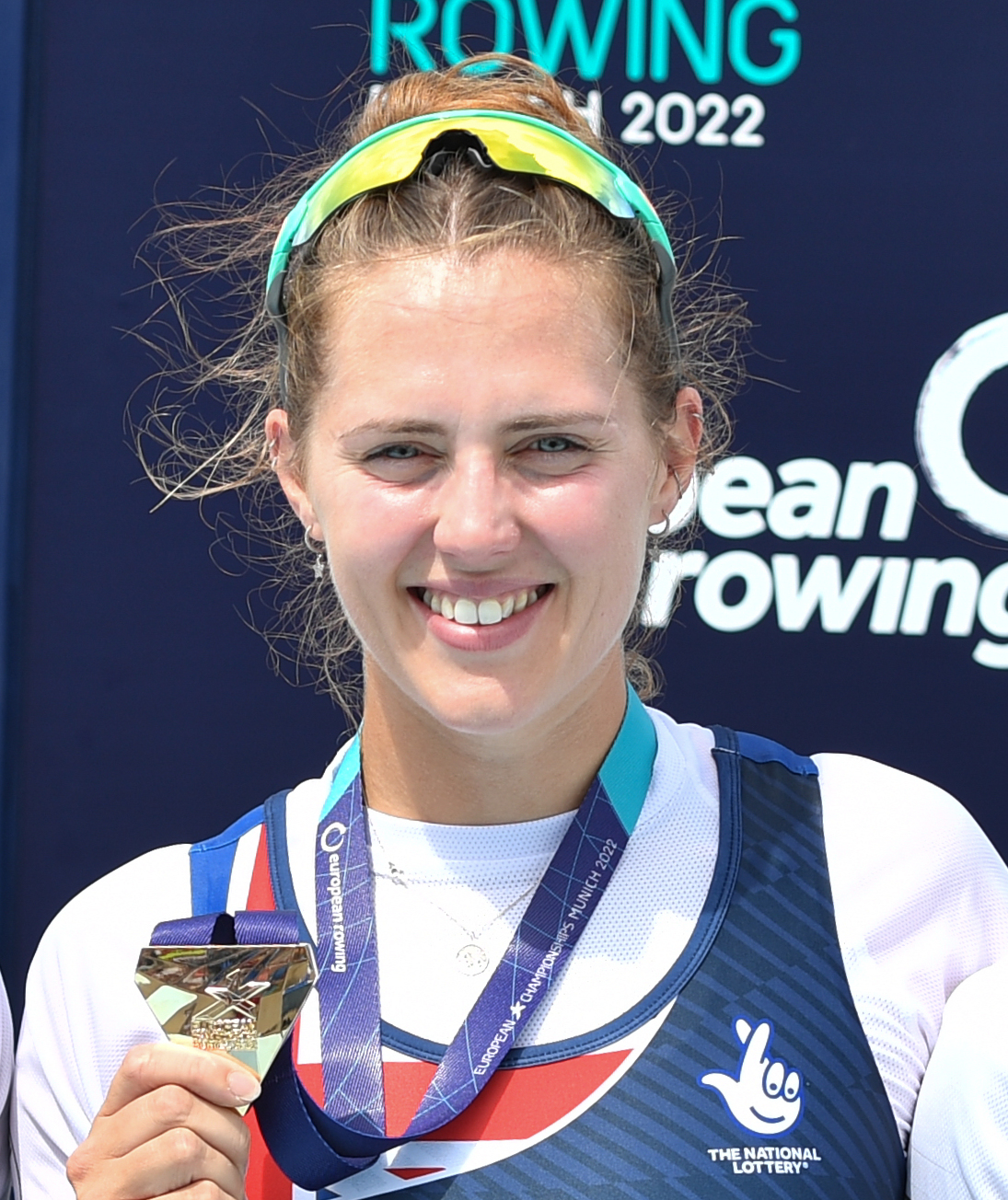
- Redgrave in 2022

Personal information
- Full name: Samantha Redgrave
- Born: 18 August 1994 (age 32) Newcastle-upon-Tyne

Sport
- Club: Univ of East Anglia BC; Norwich RC
Medal record
Women's rowing
Representing Great Britain
Olympic Games
| Silver medal – second place | 2024 Paris | Coxless four |
World Championships
| Gold medal – first place | 2022 Račice | Coxless four |
European Championships
| Gold medal – first place | 2022 Oberschleißheim | Coxless four |
| Gold medal – first place | 2024 Szeged | Coxless four |
| Silver medal – second place | 2022 Oberschleißheim | Eight |
| Silver medal – second place | 2023 Bled | Eight |

Samantha Redgrave (born 18 August 1994) is a British rower. She won gold medals in the coxless four at the 2022 European Rowing Championships, the 2024 European Rowing Championships, and the 2022 World Rowing Championships.

== Early life ==
Redgrave grew up in Gateshead, moved to Frinton in her early teens and went to university in Norwich. She started rowing at the University of East Anglia in 2013, and rowed intermittently for the following few years while working in the Norfolk and Norwich hospital as an assistant practitioner. Her coach at the Norwich Rowing Club persuaded her to tryout for the British rowing team in 2018–19.

== Personal life ==
She is no relation to Britain's five-time Olympic rowing champion Steve Redgrave.
