= Reading Blue Coat School Boat Club =

English Rowing club

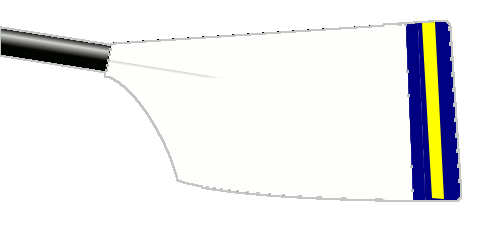
- Location: Reading Blue Coat School, Holme Park, Sonning, Reading, RG4 6SU, England
- Coordinates: 51°28′12″N 0°55′12″W
- Home water: River Thames
- Affiliations: British Rowing boat code - RBL
- Website: rbcs.org.uk/co-curricular/sports/

Reading Blue Coat School Boat Club is a rowing club based in Sonning, Reading, England. The home water is on the River Thames, with the boathouse on the periphery of the school grounds by the Thames Path.

== History ==
In 1983, Craig Buckley was the first member of the club to be selected for international honours, after competing at the World Youth Championships in Vichy, during August 1983.

The club first entered Henley Royal Regatta in 2005 and recorded their race win in 2019. Success at the British Rowing Championships was first achieved at the 2021 British Rowing Junior Championships under the coaching of Allan French.

Girls joined the boat club in 2023.

Further national success came at the 2023 British Rowing Junior Championships and the 2024 British Rowing Championships.

== Honours ==
=== British champions ===
Year	Winning crew/s
2021	Open J18 2-
2023	Open J18 8+, Open J16 4+
2024	Open J18 8+, Open J16 4+
