= Hexham Rowing Club =

British rowing club

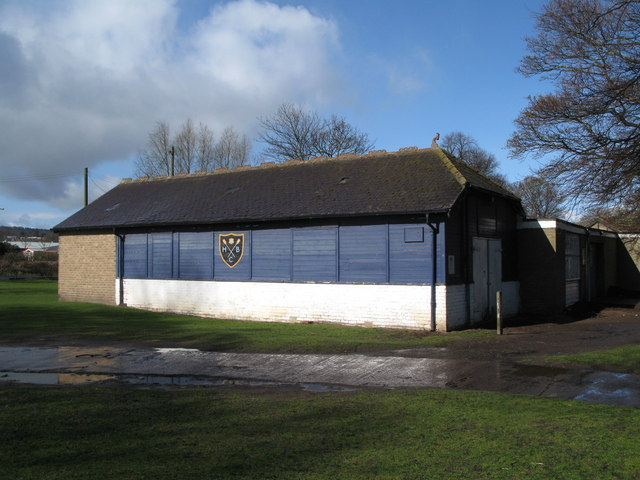

- Location: Tyne Green boathouse, Nr Hexham Bridge, Hexham, Northumberland, England
- Coordinates: 54.976094°N 2.095789°W
- Founded: 1878
- Affiliations: British Rowing boat code - HEX
- Website: www.hexhamrc.co.uk

Hexham Rowing Club is a rowing club on the River Tyne, based at Tyne Green boathouse, Nr Hexham Bridge, Hexham, Northumberland, England.

== History ==
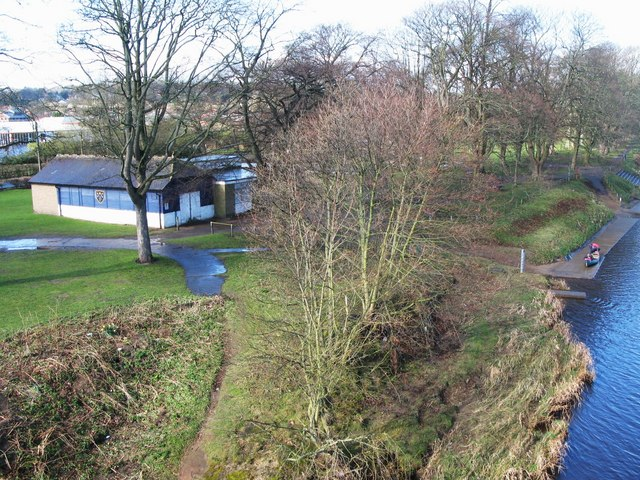
Boathouse in 2009

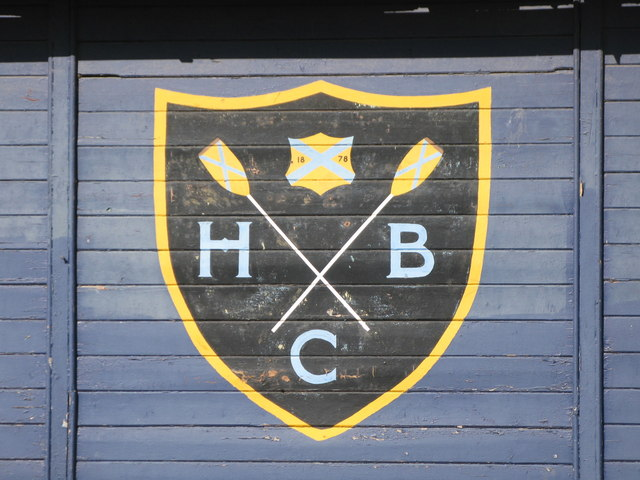
The boathouse coat of arms

The club was founded as the Hexham Boat Club in 1878 and celebrated its 130th anniversary in 2008.

In 1958, a new boathouse was built and the club admitted women for the first time. The project was overseen by former Olympic coach George Flint. In 1981, facilities were renovated following a promotional scheme.

The annual Hexham Regatta is held on the first Saturday of June.

The club has won gold medals at the British Rowing Championships in 2022, 2023 and 2024.

== Honours ==
=== British champions ===
Year	Winning crew/s
2022	Women J14 4x+
2023	Open J15 2x
2024	Open J15 2x
