= Sir William Perkins's School Boat Club =

British rowing club

- Location: Sir William Perkins's School Boat Club, Thameside, Laleham, Surrey
- Coordinates: 51.403934°N 0.490059°W
- Home water: Laleham Reach, River Thames
- Founded: 2003
- Affiliations: British Rowing boat code – SWP
- Website: www.swps.org.uk/swpsbc/swpsbc-home

Sir William Perkins's School Boat Club (SWPSBC) is a rowing club based on the River Thames at Sir William Perkins's School Boathouse, Thameside, Laleham, Surrey.

== History ==
Sir William Perkins's School Boat Club was founded in 2003 by Liz Bernard, a teacher at the school, to introduce pupils to the sport of rowing. Originally operating out of Staines BC, a new boathouse was opened in 2016 as part of the school's Building Development Programme, and is owned by Sir William Perkins's School, with rowing being the major school sport. The boathouse is located next door to Burway Rowing Club.

Since its foundation in 2003, the club has won many national medals, enjoyed victories at Henley Women's Regatta, and has had crews racing at each edition of Henley Royal Regatta since 2018. Since 2011, there has been a growing list of SWPS international athletes, who have competed for both the Great Britain and England Rowing Teams at Under 16, Under 19, Under 23 and Olympic level whilst representing the Boat Club.

At the 2024 Olympic Games in Paris, Hattie Taylor became the first member of Sir William Perkins's School Boat Club to stand on the Olympic podium, winning bronze in the Great Britain Women's eight.

At the 2026 National Schools' Regatta, the club ranked 6th on the overall medal table - the highest placed girls' school programme - with three gold medals. This included the Championship Girls' Coxless Four, who rowed to a new national record time. The 2026 British Rowing Club Championships saw Perkins crews win nine medals - four of them Gold - and set two new British Championships records en route to second on the overall medal table. Henley Women's Regatta included the first ever Perkins eight to reach the semi-finals, and at Henley Royal Regatta, the 1st Quad became the first Perkins crew to progress to the weekend - as semi-finalists.

== Honours ==
=== Henley Royal Regatta ===
Year	Event & Round
2018	Diamond Jubilee Challenge Cup (Junior Women's 4x) Qualified
2019	Diamond Jubilee (JW4x) Qualified
2021	Diamond Jubilee (JW4x) Pre-Qualified
2022	Diamond Jubilee (JW4x) Qualified
2023	Diamond Jubilee (JW4x) Quarter-Final, Prince Philip Challenge Trophy (Junior Women's 8+) Qualified
2024	Diamond Jubilee (JW4x) Pre-Qualified, Prince Philip (JW8+) Qualified
2025	Diamond Jubilee (JW4x) Quarter-Final, Prince Philip (JW8+) Qualified
2026	Diamond Jubilee (JW4x) Semi-Final, Prince Philip (JW8+) Pre-Qualified

=== Henley Women's Regatta ===
Year	Event & Round
2010	J16 4+ Quarter-Final, J16 4x Quarter-Final
2011	J16 4+ Winners, J16 4+ Semi-Final, J16 4x Quarter-Final
2012	J16 4+ Winners, J16 4+ Final – All-Perkins final
2013	Junior 4+ Quarter-Final, J16 4+ Quarter-Final
2014	Junior 8+ Quarter-Final
2015	Junior 4x Quarter-Final
2017	Junior 8+ Quarter-Final
2018	Junior 4x Quarter-Final, J16 4+ Quarter-Final
2019	Junior 2x Winners, Junior 4+ Quarter-Final
2021	Junior 4x Quarter-Final
2022	Junior 2x Semi-Final, J16 4x Quarter-Final
2023	Junior 4x Semi-Final
2024	Junior 4x Semi-Final
2025	Junior 4x Semi-Final
2026	Junior 4x Semi-Final, Junior 8+ Semi-Final

=== British Rowing Champions ===
Year	Winning Crew
2018	WJ18 4x, WJ16 2x
2019	WJ16 2x
2023	WJ18 2x, WJ16 2x
2024	WJ18 2-
2025	WClub 2-, WJ18 2-, WJ18 4-, WJ18 4x (composite)
2026	WJ16 4x, WJ16 2x, WJ16 4+, WJ15 4x+

=== National Schools' Regatta ===
Year	Event & Medal
2009	J15 Girls' 8+ Gold
2010	J14 Girls’ 8x+ Gold, J15 Girls' 8+ Bronze
2011	J14 Girls' 4x+ Gold, J16 Girls' 4+ Bronze
2012	J16 Girls' 4+ Gold, J15 Girls' 4+ Silver, J14 4×+ Silver, J16 Girls' 2- Bronze
2013	Championship Girls' 2- Gold, J16 Girls' 8+ Silver, J16 Girls' 4+ Bronze
2016	J15 Girls' 1st 8+ Silver, J15 Girls' 2nd 8+ Bronze
2017	Girls' 2nd 4x Bronze
2019	J15 Girls' 2nd 8+ Gold, Girls' 4+ Bronze
2022	Championship Girls' 2x Silver, J16 Girls' 2nd 4x Silver, J15 Girls' 1st 8+ Bronze
2023	Championship Girls' 2x Silver, J16 Girls' 2x Bronze, J15 Girls' 2nd 4x+ Bronze
2024	J16 Girls' 2x Silver, J15 Girls' 2nd 4×+ Silver, Championship Girls' 2x Bronze, Championship Girls' 2- Bronze, Championship Girls' 4+ Bronze
2026	Championship Girls' 4- Gold, J16 Girls' 2nd 4x Gold, J15 Girls' 1st 4x+ Gold, J16 Girls' 1st 4x Silver, J15 Girls' 2nd 4×+ Silver, Championship Girls' 2x Bronze

=== Schools' Head of the River ===
Year	Event & Medal
2011	WJ15 8+ Gold
2012	WJ16 8+ Gold
2013	WJ18 Champ 8+ Bronze
2022	WJ15 Sch 8+ Gold
2026	WJ18 Sch 8+ Gold, WJ15 Sch 8+ Gold

=== International Honours ===
Year	Crew	Event	Venue
2011	GBR WJ16 4-	GB vs France J16 Match	London, England
2012	GBR WJ16 4-	GB vs France J16 Match	Gravelines, France
2013	GBR WJ16 8+(GOLD)	GB vs France J16 Match	London, England
2013	GBR U19 W4-(2 GOLDS) & W8+(GOLD)	Coupe de la Jeunesse	Lucerne, Switzerland
2018	GBR U19 W2x(GOLD)	Munich Junior Regatta	Munich, Germany
2018	GBR U19 W2x(BRONZE)	Coupe de la Jeunesse	Cork, Ireland
2019	GBR U19 W2x	Munich Junior Regatta	Munich, Germany
2019	GBR U19 W8+(BRONZE) & W4x	Coupe de la Jeunesse	Corgeno, Italy
2021	GBR W4-(4th) H.Taylor	Olympic Games	Tokyo, Japan
2022	GBR U19 W2x (GOLD & SILVER)	Coupe de la Jeunesse	Castrelo de Miño, Spain
2023	GBR WJ16 2-	GB vs France J16 Match	Nottingham, England
2023	GBR WJ16 2x	GB vs France J16 Match	Nottingham, England
2023	England WJ18 2x(GOLD) & 4x(GOLD)	Home International Regatta	Lough Rinn, Ireland
2024	GBR U19 W2-(SILVER) & 4-	Munich Junior Regatta	Munich, Germany
2024	England WJ18 2-(GOLD), 8+(GOLD) & Sprint 8+(GOLD)	Home International Regatta	Strathclyde, Scotland
2024	GBR W8+(BRONZE) H.Taylor	Olympic Games	Paris, France
2024	GBR U19 W2x	Coupe de la Jeunesse	Račice, Czechia
2024	GBR U19 W2-	World Rowing U19 Championships	St Catharines, Canada
2024	GBR U19 W4-(SILVER)	World Rowing U19 Championships	St Catharines, Canada
2025	GBR U19 W4x(GOLD) & 2x	Munich Junior Regatta	Munich, Germany
2025	GBR WJ16 8+(GOLD)	GB vs France J16 Match	London, England
2025	England WJ18 2-(GOLD), 8+(GOLD) & Sprint 8+(GOLD)	Home International Regatta	Dorney Lake, England
2025	England W Sprint 8+(GOLD), W2- & 8+ A. Cowell & K. Burton	Home International Regatta	Dorney Lake, England
2025	GBR U19 W2x(SILVER)	World Rowing U19 Championships	Trakai, Lithuania
2026	GBR WJ16 4+	GB vs France J16 Match	Gravelines, France
2026	GBR U23 W2- A. Cowell	World Rowing U23 Championships	Duisburg, Germany
2026	GBR U19 W4-(2 GOLDS)	Coupe de la Jeunesse	Lucerne, Switzerland
2026	GBR U19 W8+(2 GOLDS)	Coupe de la Jeunesse	Lucerne, Switzerland
2026	GBR U19 W2x	Coupe de la Jeunesse	Lucerne, Switzerland

== Notable alumnae ==
- Harriet Taylor

== See also ==
- Rowing on the River Thames
