= Shiplake Vikings Rowing Club =

British rowing club

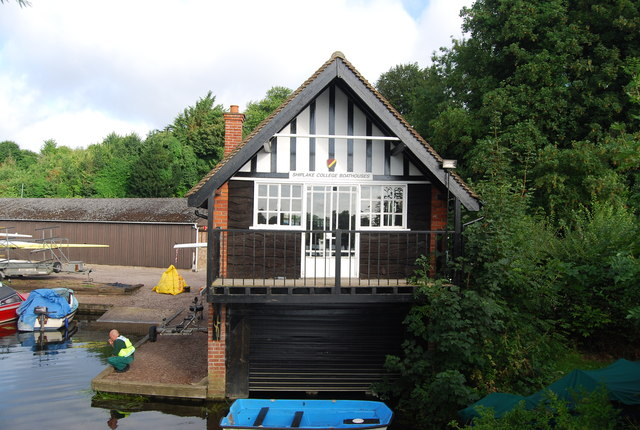

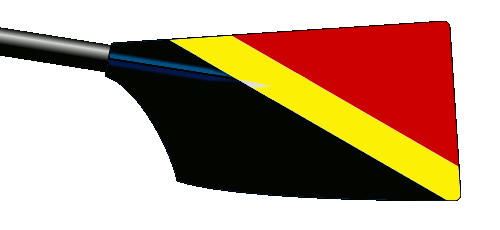
- Location: Shiplake College Boathouse, Henley-on-Thames, Oxfordshire, England
- Coordinates: 51.496801°N 0.894918°W
- Affiliations: British Rowing boat code (SHV)
- Website: shiplakevikingsrowing.club

Shiplake Vikings Rowing Club is a rowing club based on the River Thames at Shiplake College Boathouse, Henley-on-Thames, Oxfordshire, England. The blade colours are maroon, yellow and black; kit: black and black.

== History ==
A Shiplake Vikings club existed in during the 1960s, with crews gaining significant success at the 1963 Henley Town Regatta.

The current club is believed to have been re-formed during the 1980s, following discussions at the Baskerville Arms which resulted in permission from Shiplake College to use their boathouse facilities. New boathouse plans for the College have been passed and construction started in 2019.

In recent years the club has produced some national champions.

== Honours ==
=== National champions ===
Year	Winning crew/s
2014	Open J15 2x
2015	Women J18 4-
2016	Women J18 4-
