= Bewl Bridge Rowing Club =

British rowing club

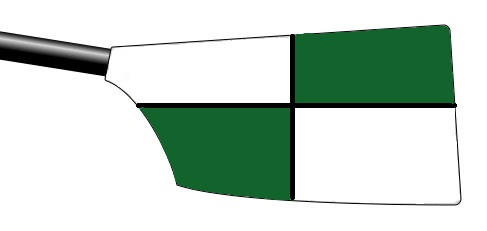
- Location: Bewl Water, Bewlbridge Lane, Lamberhurst, Wadhurst, Tunbridge Wells
- Coordinates: 51.076376°N 0.385951°E
- Founded: 1977
- Affiliations: British Rowing boat code - BEB
- Website: www.bewlrowingclub.co.uk

Bewl Bridge Rowing Club is a rowing club on the Bewl Water, based at Bewlbridge Lane, Lamberhurst, Wadhurst, Tunbridge Wells. Rowers aged 12 and upwards of any ability are allowed to join the club.

== History ==
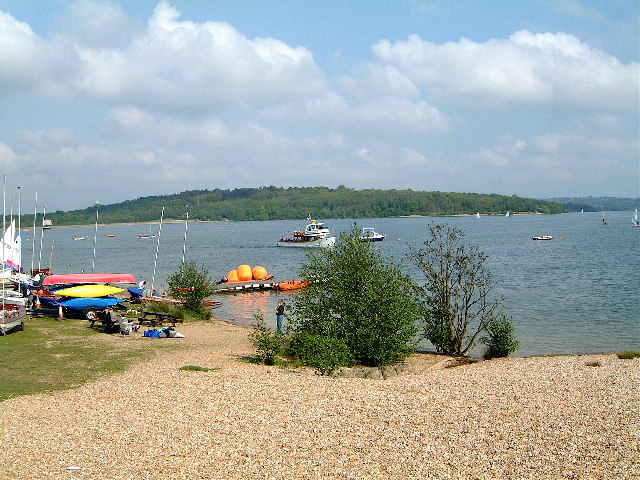
View of Bewl Water from the boathouse in 2003

The plans for rowing on the reservoir were announced in November 1975 by the Greater London and South East Regional Sports Council, following the construction of the reservoir by the Southern Water authority.

The club was founded in 1977 and the boathouse is situated on the Northern side of the Bewl Water reservoir. Out of the 770 acres of open water, 660 was set aside for water sports of which one section was rowing.

The club's first significant success was that of Andrew Rudkin reaching the Double Sculls Challenge Cup final at the 1979 Henley Royal Regatta.

In recent years the club has had success at the 2021 British Rowing Junior Championships and 2023 British Rowing Junior Championships, which included winning three gold medals.

== Honours ==
=== British champions ===
Year	Winning crew/s
2021	Open J18 1x
2023	Open J16 1x, Open J16 2x

== Alumni ==
Emily Craig, Gold Medal Winner in Rowing at the 2024 Summer Olympics, Lightweight double sculls
