= Claires Court School Boat Club =

British rowing club

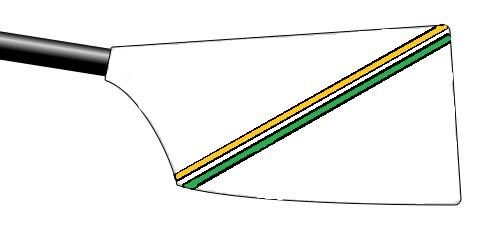
- Location: Maidenhead
- Coordinates: 51.5225°N 0.7000°W
- Founded: 1985
- Affiliations: British Rowing boat code - CCS
- Website: www.ccsbc.clairescourt.net

Claires Court School Boat Club is a rowing club based on the River Thames in Maidenhead.

== History ==
The club belongs to Claires Court School and was founded in 1985 by a teacher at the school, Peter Jowitt.

The boat club has won events at major regattas including the British Rowing Championships, the National Schools' Regatta and the Henley Royal Regatta and has experienced success in smaller events such as the Egham Regatta and Hereford City Regatta.

In recent years the club has produced a number of junior British champions, with the most recent being at the 2025 British Rowing Club Championships.

== Honours ==
=== British champions ===
Year	Winning crew
1990	Men J16 2-
1991	Men J14 2x
1992	Men J15 2x
1993	Men J16 1x
1997	Men J18 1x
1998	Men J18 2x
2013	Open J15 4x+
2014	Open J15 4x+
2015	Open J18 8+, Open J16 4+
2016	Open J18 2x, Open J18 4-
2018	Open J16 4x
2019	Open J18 2x
2024	Open J16 2-
2025	Open J18 8+

|2026 || Women’s J18 4-</ref> |- Key- J junior, 2, 4, 8 crew size, 18, 16, 15, 14 age group, x sculls, - coxless, + coxed

=== Henley Royal Regatta ===
Year	Races won
1997	Fawley Challenge Cup
1998	Fawley Challenge Cup
2016	Fawley Challenge Cup
2022	Diamond Jubilee Challenge Cup
