= Glasgow Schools Rowing Club =

Scottish rowing club

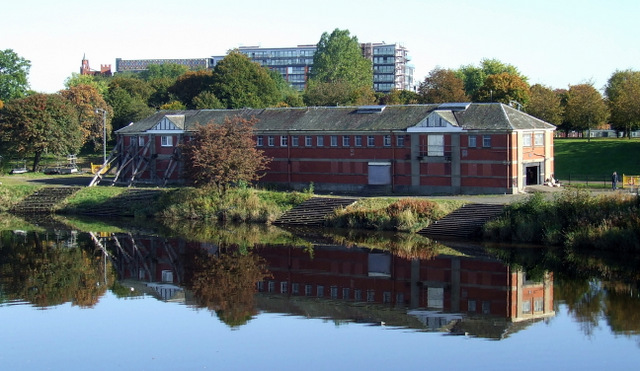

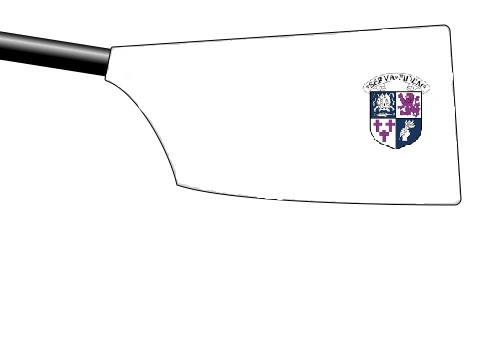
- Location: Glasgow Schools East boathouse, Glasgow Green, Glasgow, Scotland
- Coordinates: 55.848032°N 4.236226°W
- Founded: 1942
- Affiliations: Scottish Rowing
- Website: glasgowschoolsrowingclub.co.uk

Glasgow Schools Rowing Club (GSRC) is a rowing club on the River Clyde, based at the East Boathouse, Glasgow Green, Glasgow, Scotland. The club is affiliated to Scottish Rowing and is a collective of Glasgow Schools whose membership fees provide a large percentage of the club's registered charity income.

== History ==
The club was founded in 1942, rowing from the Clydesdale Amateur Rowing Club, with the purpose of "promoting rowing among boys in the Post Intermediate Departments of Senior Secondary Schools". The club initially received a grant from the Education Committee.

In 1951 the club moved to the East boathouse in Glasgow Green (built in 1924) with the club being used by 15 schools at the time. The number of schools had risen to 18 by the early 1960s but the number reduced during the 1970s. St Mungo's Academy, Whitehill Secondary School, St Aloysius' College, Glasgow, Holyrood Secondary School and Hutchesons' Grammar School remained active with the club until it reduced further in membership.

In 2007 the club experienced a revival following the introduction of indoor rowing to all Glasgow Secondary Schools. The following year Glasgow Academy Boat Club started sharing the boathouse and the GSRC once again gained membership from St Mungo's, Hutcheson Grammar and St Aloysius. Lourdes Secondary School and Kelvinside Academy and helped bring the number up to seven schools as of 2020. The boathouse is also used by the Glasgow University Boat Club.

== Honours ==
=== National champions ===
Year	Winning crew/s
2016	Open J15 1x, Women J18 2-
