= University of East Anglia Boat Club =

British rowing club

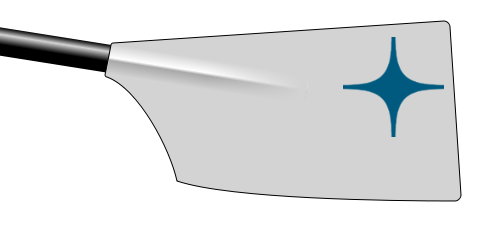
- Location: Whitlingham Lane, Trowse, Norwich, Norfolk, England
- Coordinates: 52.620548°N 1.323084°E
- Home water: River Yare
- Founded: 1963
- Membership: 55
- Affiliations: British Rowing
- Website: www.ueabc.co.uk

The University of East Anglia Boat Club (UEABC) is the rowing club of the University of East Anglia, England. It currently has 60 members and rows year round from September to July. The club rows on the Yare River in Norwich and has its main base at the Whitlingham boathouse on Whitlingham Lane, where is shares facilities with the local rowing and canoeing clubs, Norwich School and Norwich High School. The boathouse is centred 3.5 miles (5.6 km) from the University and the club has the UEA Sportspark on campus.

== History ==
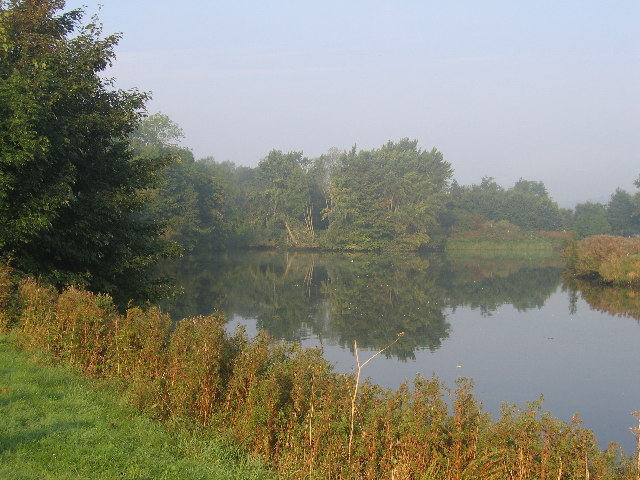
River Yare from Whitlingham Lane

In 2010, a new boathouse began construction at a cost of approximately £1,000,000. The second phase, completed in 2013, consisted of fitting out the first floor area, including toilets, changing rooms and shower facilities; gym/fitness areas; kitchen; educational/meeting area; and a first aid/office. The boathouse was finished in 2016.

In 2024, former UEABC rower Samantha Redgrave won a silver medal at the 2024 Summer Olympics in Paris.

== Boats ==
The boat club benefits from 15 km of rowable river with room for the club's eights including a 2 km straight. Smaller boats can access a longer stretch of the river and it is possible to row all the way to the east coast.

The current boats within UEABC include five 8+s and five 4+s, including a Hudson USP8+ and Stämpfli 4+ for the top Men's crews, and a Filippi 8+ and Filippi 4+ for the top Women's crew. The Novice Men's crew use the Stampfli 8+ and the Women use a Wintech 8+, Sims 4+ and Janousek 4+. The boat club also has access to smaller boats, some which are shared with Norwich Rowing Club, along with coaching launches.

== Racing ==
The Boat Club competes across the country in some of the oldest boat races in England with the men's and women's squads being equally successful such as:

2024/25 results:

- Head of the River Race (HORR) 2025 - Senior Men's 8+ 96th overall - winning the Medium Academic Pennant
- Women's Eights Head of the River Race - Academic Challenge A -- overall, Academic Challenge 8+ -- overall
- BUCS Head 2025 - O Int 8+ ---, O Int 4+ -- and --, W Int 8+ -- and --, W Int 4+ -- and ---,
- Bedford 4s & 8s Head
- Star Club Head 2024 - 1st in Senior Men's 8+, 1st in Senior Men's 2x and 2nd in Senior Men's 2-
- Isle of Ely Head 2024 - 1st in Senior Men's 8+
- Cambridge Winter Head 2024 - 6th and 7th in Senior Men's 4+ (student first boat) and 1st in Senior Men's 4+ (student lower boat)

2023/24 results:

- Henley Women's Regatta Women's Development 4+ in the semi-finals
- BUCS Regatta 2024 - O Int 8+ 2nd in D final (20th overall), O Int 4+ 3rd in F final (32nd overall), O Int Lwt 2- 3rd in B final (9th overall), W Int 2- 37th in time trial, W Ch Lwt 2x 3rd in B final (9th overall), W Int Lwt 1x 2nd and 4th in the B final (8th and 10th overall), W Int 4+ 47th in time trial, W Beg 8+ 4th in A final, W Beg 4+ 2nd and 4th in B final (8th and 10th overall)
- Head of the River Race (HORR) 2024- Senior Men's 8+ 101st overall - 33rd University Crew
- Hammersmith Head 2024 - 4th in O Int 8+ Club
- BUCS Head 2024 - O Int 8+ 15th, O Int 4+ 14th and 20th, W Int 8+ 26th, W Int 4+ 19th and 25th, W Beg 8+ 9th, W Beg 4+ 9th and 13th
- Peterborough Head 2024 - 1st in Senior Men's 8+, 1st in Senior Men's 2x and 2nd in Senior Men's 2-
- Isle of Ely Head 2023 - 1st in Senior Men's 8+
- Cambridge Winter Head 2023 - 6th and 7th in Senior Men's 4+ (student first boat) and 1st in Senior Men's 4+ (student lower boat)
- Peterborough Spring Regatta 2023 - W Beg 4+ 1st

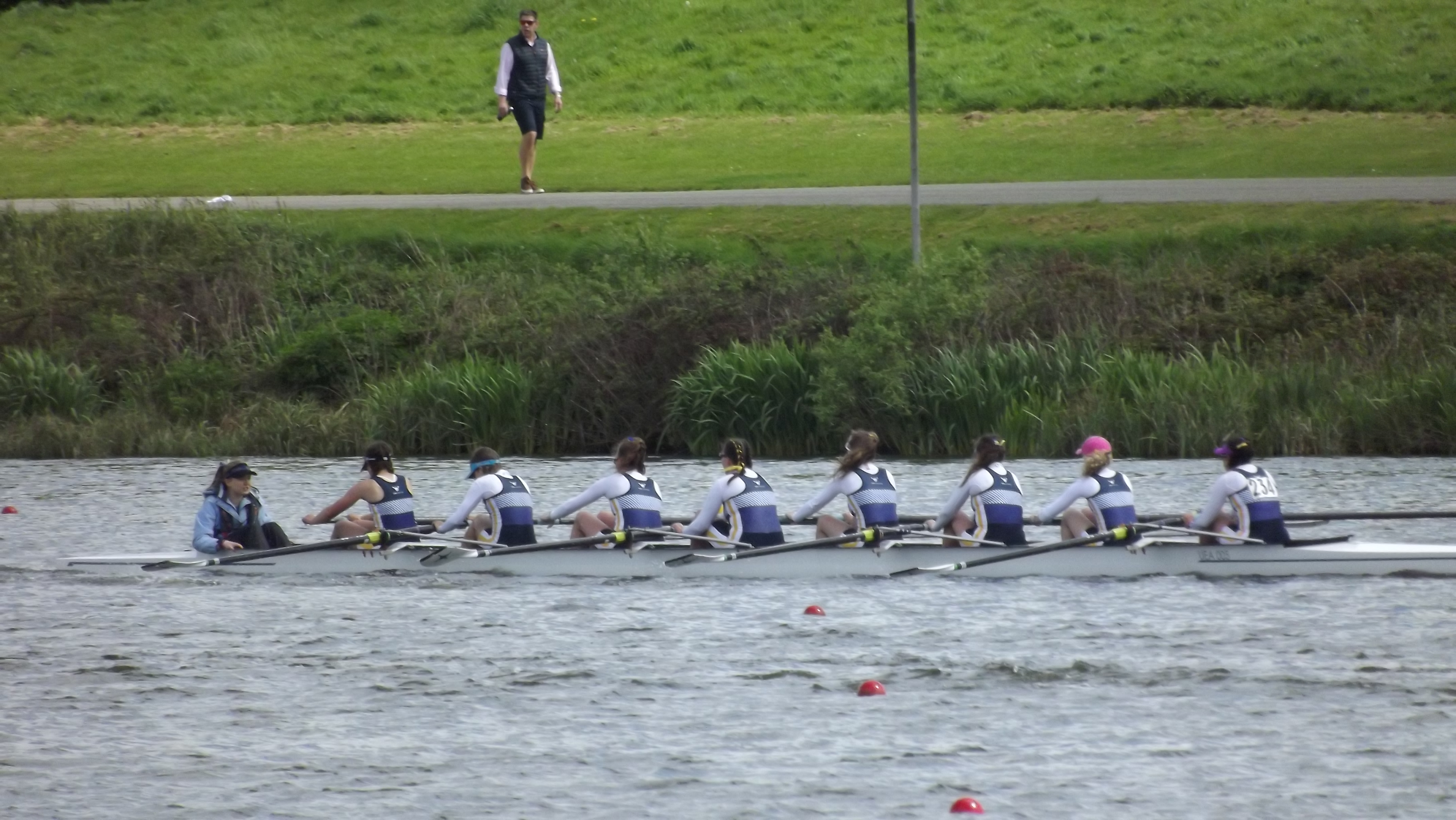
Novice Women's 8+ at BUCS Regatta 2024

Previous results and races:

- Yare Cup
- Norwich Head
- Women's Head of the River Race (WEHORR)
- BUCS Head 2018 - O Beg 8+ 7th
- HORR 153rd 2018
- Cambridge Winter Head 2-17 - IM3 4+ 1st
- BUCS Regatta 2011 - Both Men's and Women's IM2 8+ semi-final
- Peterborough Regatta 2011 - Men's IM2 2- 2n
- Bedford Regatta 2011 - W Beg 8+ 1st
- Henley Women's Regatta 2011 - 8+ in the semi-finals
- Henley Royal Regatta 2011 - Men's 8+ qualified
- Henley Royal Regatta 2009 - Men's 4+ qualified

== Training camps ==
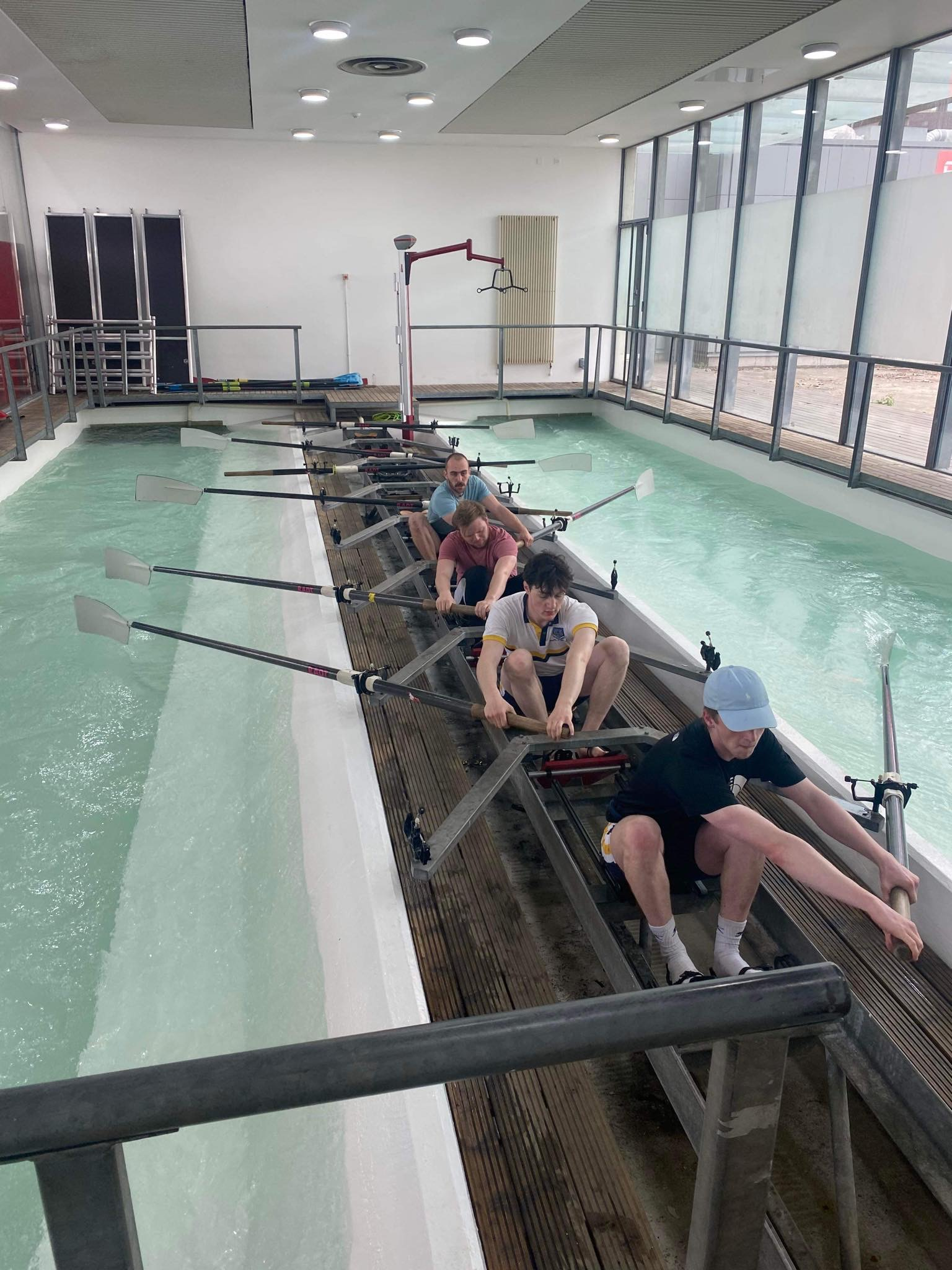
Senior Men training in a powered rowing tank in London during Easter Training Camp 2024

The Men's and Women's squads usually have a Christmas, Easter and September Training Camp which allow for a very intensive training programme mainly consisting of several water outings each day. The programme usually consists of seat racing and timed pieces. As well, in the Easter Training Camp regatta starts are practiced and 2k tests are taken at this stage so that boats can be set for the regatta season. In the most recent Training Camp, Easter 2024, the Men's squad spent a couple of days training in London at the Docklands.

== Social events ==
As well as the top crews' training 8 times a week, the club has many social events.

In addition to these events, the boat club has several formal events each year.

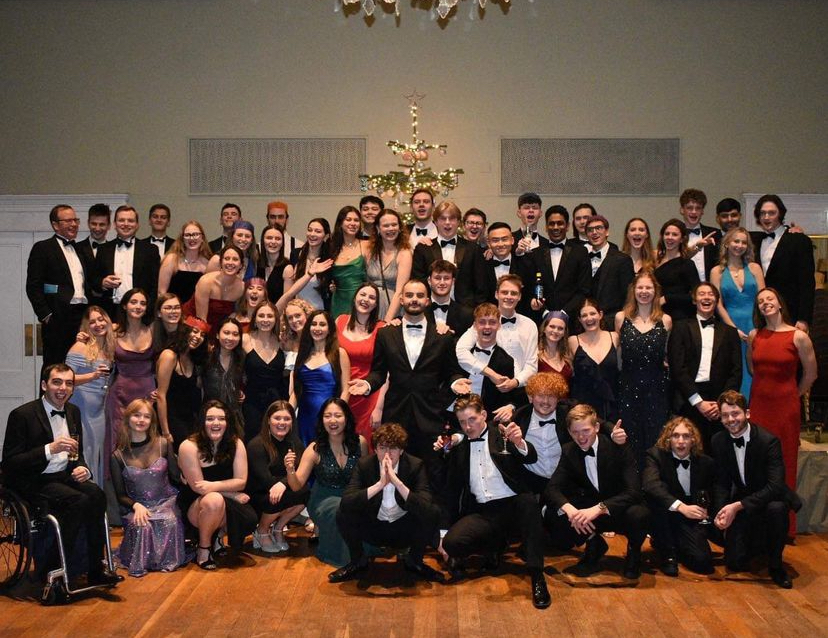
Winter Ball 2023 - Club Photo

- The Christmas Ball takes place at the end of the first semester and is one of the biggest events. Last year this event was held at The Assembly House, Norwich. Everyone enjoyed a three course meal, followed by a prize giving and then a dance.
- The Water Sports Ball takes place at the end of the third semester.

== Notable members ==
- Samantha Redgrave

== See also ==
- University rowing (UK)
- British Universities & Colleges Sport
