= Grange School Rowing Club =

British rowing club

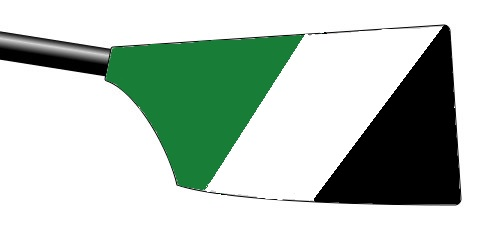
- Location: Willow Green Lane, Little Leigh, Northwich, Cheshire
- Coordinates: 52.355518°N 1.17432°W
- Affiliations: British Rowing (boat code GRN)
- Website: www.grange.org.uk/senior-school/senior-school-education/sport

Grange School Rowing Club is a rowing club on the River Weaver, based at the Boathouse, off Willow Green Lane, Little Leigh, Northwich, Cheshire.

== History ==
The club belongs to The Grange School, Northwich.

In recent years the club has produced multiple British champions.

== Honours ==
=== British champions ===
Year	Winning crew/s
2003	Women J16 1x
2004	Open J14 2x
2005	Open J15 2x
2006	Open J16 2x
2008	Open J18 2x
2011	Women J16 2x
2013	Open J16 1x
2016	Women J15 1x
2023	Open J16 4x-
