= Isle of Ely Rowing Club =

British rowing club

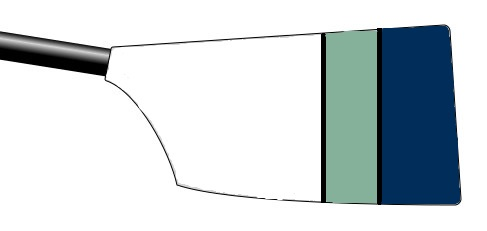
- Location: Kiln Lane, Prickwillow Road, Ely, Cambridgeshire, England
- Coordinates: 52.399585°N 0.287101°E
- Founded: 2004
- Affiliations: British Rowing boat code - IEL
- Website: www.elyrowingclub.org.uk/index.php

Isle of Ely Rowing Club is a rowing club on the River Great Ouse based at Kiln Lane, Prickwillow Road, Ely, Cambridgeshire, England. The boathouse is on a stretch of water near the Queen Adelaide Straight.

== History ==
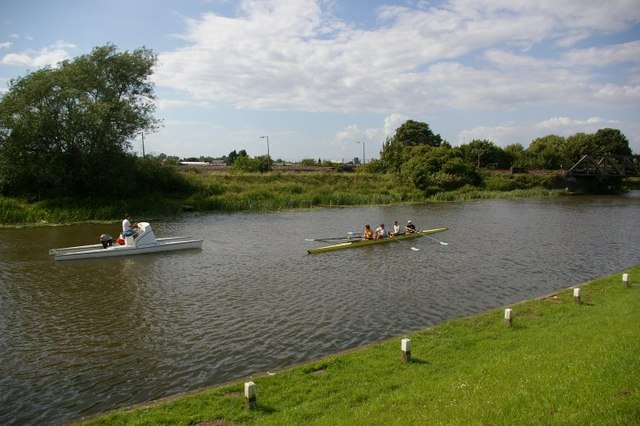
Rowing on the River Great Ouse at Ely during 2007

An original Isle of Ely Rowing Club existed in 1924 but it is not much else is known about the club.

In 1944, the River Great Ouse, including the Queen Adelaide straight was the venue for third unofficial wartime boat race.

The club was founded in 2004 and has experienced major national success in recent years.

== Honours ==
=== National champions ===
Year	Winning crew/s
2010	Open 1x
2011	Open U23 1x
2012	Open 1x, Women L1x
2015	Women J16 4x
2017	Women J18 2x, Women J16 4x
2019	Women J16 4x
