= University of Surrey Boat Club =

British Rowing Club

- Location: Guildford, UK (United Kingdom)
- Home water: River Thames
- Founded: 1947
- Membership: 90 approx.
- University: University of Surrey
- Affiliations: British Rowing
- Website: surreyboatclub.co.uk

University of Surrey Boat Club (USBC) is the rowing club of the University of Surrey, England. The club rows out of Molesey Boat Club located on the River Thames and completes land training at Surrey Sports Park on the university's campus.

== Squads ==
The University of Surrey Boat Club has beginner, senior and intermediate crews who all compete at races throughout the season and work hard during land and water sessions to help progress the club.

=== Beginners ===
The club has a large beginner programme that sees complete novices learn the basics of rowing, build technique and fitness to compete at some of the best events around the country. Furthermore, the programme aims to create the building blocks for progression onto the intermediate and senior rowing programmes. The club has had great success in the beginner categories in recent years winning 21 beginner medals between the 2021/22 and 2024/25 season.

=== Seniors ===
In recent years, the senior squad has been getting stronger. Integrating with Molesey Boat Club's development squad has seen Surrey athletes compete nationally and internationally and push for even larger events such as Henley Royal Regatta.

== High performance athletes ==
Team Surrey represents sport at Surrey University on behalf of the students' union, and offers 12 HPASS (High Performance Athlete Support Scheme) places every year to Surrey students with 'exceptional sporting ability'. Athletes benefit from free use of Surrey Sports Park facilities, personalised strength and conditioning programmes, and physiotherapy and sports massage. This scholarship exists to enable athletes to excel at the top level.

== BUCS Regatta ==
BUCS Regatta 2015 saw success for USBC, taking gold in men's intermediate single scull as well as silvers in both champ lightweight single and champ double.

== Varsity ==
Until 2016, an annual rowing race between Kingston Students Rowing Club and USBC was held on the River Thames as part of the Varsity Games between the University of Surrey and Kingston University.

Year	Winner
2016	Draw
2015	Surrey
2014	Race not held
2013	Race not held
2012	Kingston
2011	Draw
2010	Kingston
