= Glasgow Academy Boat Club =

British rowing club

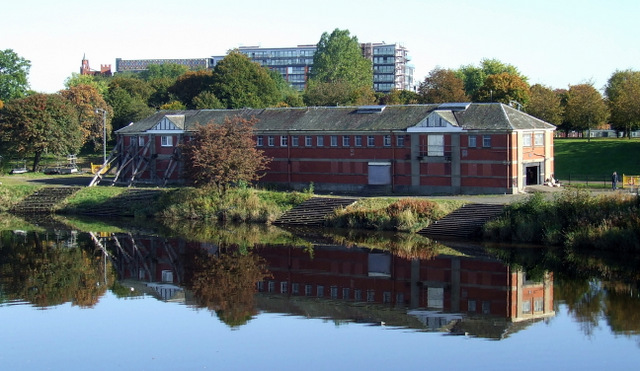

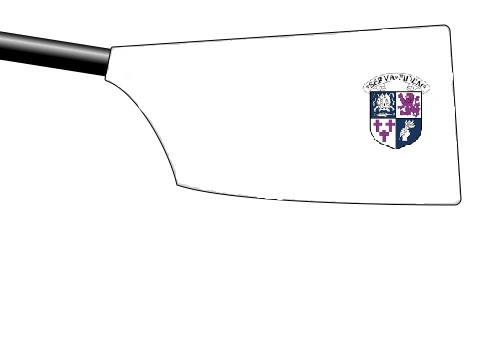
- Location: Glasgow Schools East boathouse, Glasgow Green, Glasgow, Scotland
- Coordinates: 55.848032°N 4.236226°W
- Affiliations: Scottish Rowing
- Website: theglasgowacademy.org.uk

Glasgow Academy Boat Club is a rowing club on the River Clyde, based at the Glasgow Schools East boathouse, Glasgow Green, Glasgow, Scotland. The club is affiliated to Scottish Rowing.

== History ==
The club belongs to The Glasgow Academy where rowing is a performance sport. In recent years the club has experienced considerable success with 22 international medals, including two World Championships.

The boathouse used by the school at weekends is the Glasgow Schools East boathouse in Glasgow Green, the facility is also used by the Glasgow Schools Rowing Club and the Glasgow University Boat Club. Rowing training during the week takes place at the Academy.

The club has won multiple medals at the British Rowing Championships and also competes at the National Schools' Regatta.

== Honours ==
=== National champions ===
| Year | Winning crew/s |
|---|---|
| 2011 | Open J18 2- |
| 2013 | Women J14 2x |
| 2014 | Open J16 1 x |
| 2015 | Open J18 2x |
| 2017 | Open J16 1x, Women J18 4- |
| 2018 | Women J16 2- |
| 2024 | Women J16 4+ |
