= Trafford Rowing Club =

British rowing club

- Emblem: Green single scull (overhead view) somewhat dominating the rest: 19 57 in large white font on a light blue field, inside a black roundel with green capitalised name of club
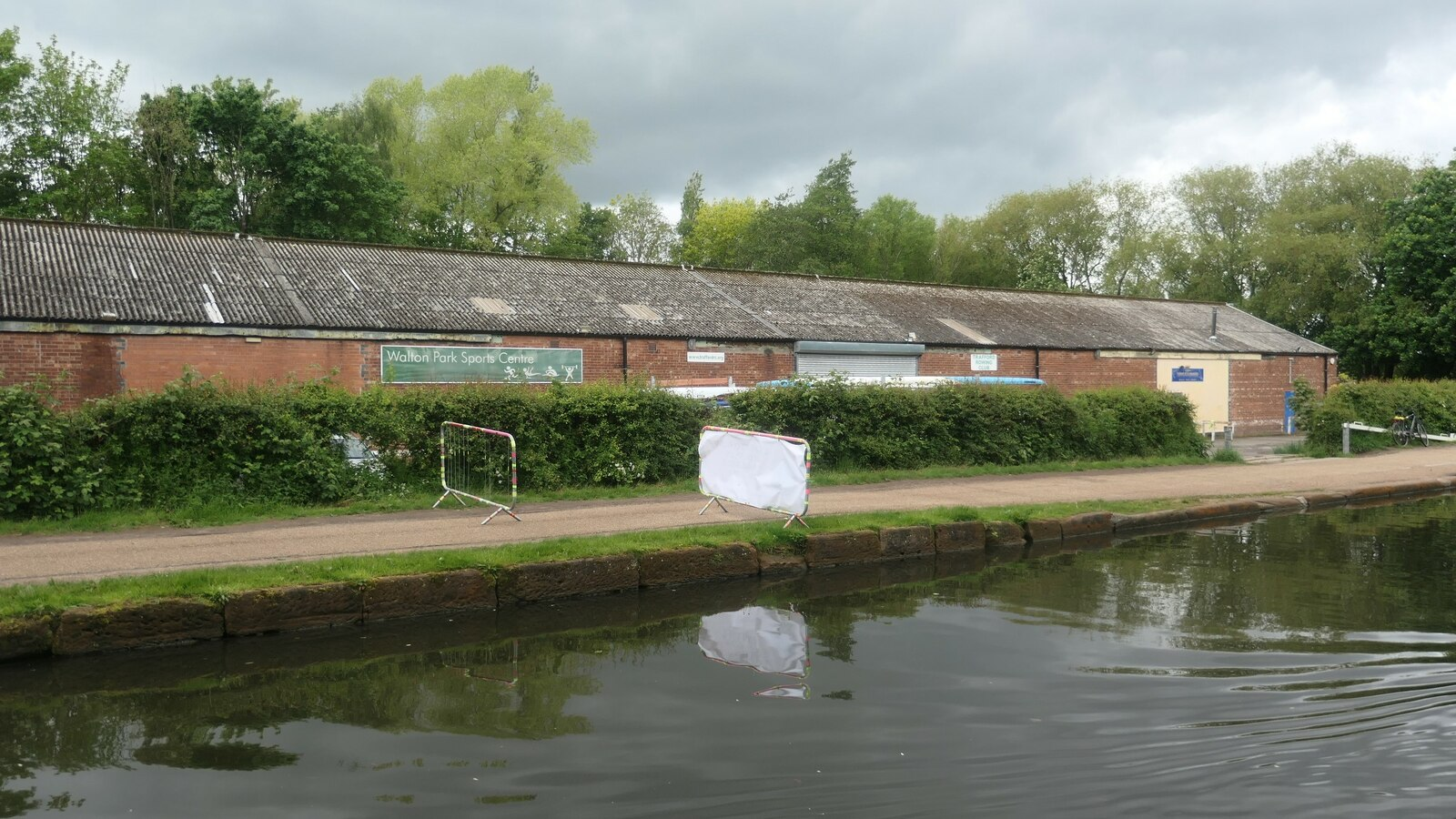

- Location: Walton Park Sports Centre, Raglan Road, Sale, Greater Manchester, M33 4AG, England
- Coordinates: 53.4146°N 2.3294°W
- Home water: Bridgewater Canal, Sale
- Founded: 1957
- Affiliations: British Rowing (boat code TRF)
- Website: www.traffordrowing.club

Trafford Rowing Club is a rowing club on the Bridgewater Canal, based at Walton Park Sports Centre, Raglan Road, Sale, Greater Manchester.

The blade colours are black with a jade band; kit: black with a jade green stripe. Trafford RC is affiliated to the sports national governing body, British Rowing, is a Community Amateur Sports Club (CASC) and in February 2009 gained Clubmark accreditation.

== History ==
According to British Rowing's records, Trafford Rowing Club (TRC) was founded in 1957 by Russell Kerniham. At that time, the club was known as the MetroVicks Boat club (MVBC), a sports club created for the employees of the Metropolitan Vickers Engineering Company based in Trafford Park. The company also gave birth to other sports clubs in the area for its staff.

The MVBC started with just four members, however during the 1960s the club did grow and achieved success at a number of events in the north. MVBC was originally based further along the Bridgewater Canal at Dane Road. Originally the clubhouse was a grain warehouse that the council donated. Club night was established on a Wednesday evening where members would go down and repair the racks and the boats.

At some point (unknown) the old boathouse burnt down and the members relocated to the current boat house in Walton Park Sports Centre in the 1980s. At this point the name changed the name to Trafford Rowing Club. The former MVBC was resurrected in its present form as Trafford Rowing Club and its blade and kit colours became black and green.

The club was run by a small number of dedicated members including notable figures such as Ken Jolley and John Gill. In the early 1990s the club began to emerge from the difficult times of the previous decade. In 1990 the club had enough members to enter a crew at the Head of the River Race in London for the first time. Since then the club has grown stronger and now has more members than any time since 1957.

In 1997, the club received a £18,200 Foundation for Sport and the Arts grant.

In 2007, the club celebrated its 50th birthday.

=== Events ===
The Head of the Bridgewater started in the late 1970/s early 1980s. The race originally started past the Bay Malton pub in Dunham Massey. The race was originally held in, November, however, given the impact of the weather conditions, the Head was moved to February. In the early 1990s the club resurrected itself and the head race is now renamed Trafford Head - it is typically held every year, apart from as a result of adverse weather conditions and most recently, COVID restrictions.

== Honours ==
=== British champions ===
Year	Winning crew/s
2016	Women J15 2x
