= Norwich Rowing Club =

British rowing club

- Location: Whitlingham Boathouses, Whitlingham Lane, Trowse, Norwich, England
- Coordinates: 52.620548°N 1.323084°E
- Founded: 1972
- Affiliations: British Rowing boat code - NOR
- Website: www.norwichrowingclub.com

Norwich Rowing Club is a rowing club on the River Yare based at Whitlingham Boathouses, Whitlingham Lane, Trowse, Norwich and is affiliated to British Rowing.

== History ==
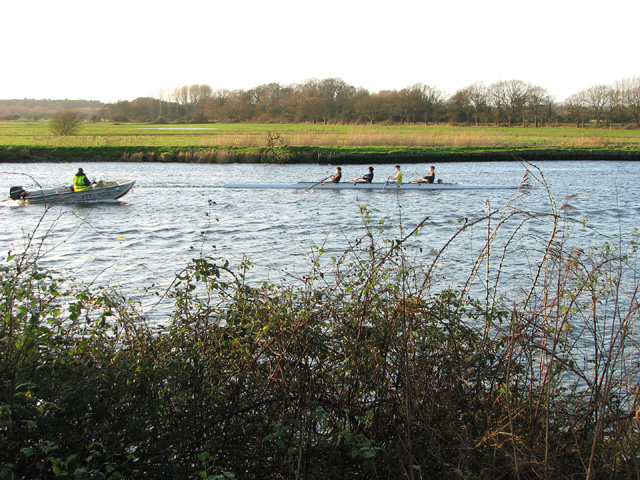
Rowing on the River Yare

The club in its current form was founded in 1972, following the merger of the Norwich Amateur Rowing Association and Yare Club. However, a Norfolk and Norwich Rowing Club existed before the formation of the Yare Rowing Club in 1890 and Norwich Amateur Rowing Association in 1892.

The club has produced multiple British champion crews and in 2024 Samantha Redgrave won a silver medal at the 2024 Summer Olympics in Paris.

== Honours ==
=== British champions ===
Year	Winning crew/s
1991	Women 2-
1998	Women U23 1x, Men J15 1x
2009	Women J14 2x
2012	Women J18 2x

== Notable members ==
- Samantha Redgrave
