= Warrington Rowing Club =

British rowing club

- Motto: Deus dat incrementum; God gives growth/increments
- Location: Howley Lane, Warrington, Cheshire
- Coordinates: 53.388°N 2.567°W
- Home water: River Mersey
- Founded: 1986
- Affiliations: British Rowing (boat code WTN)
- Website: warringtonrowing.org.uk

Warrington Rowing Club is a rowing club on the River Mersey, based at Howley Lane, Warrington, Cheshire. The club colours are primrose yellow, white and royal blue.

== History ==
The club formed its first boathouse in 1985 at Old Quay in Howley. Later that decade the club bought three pre-fabricated cottages in Hull and rebuilt them at the present site to form its second boathouse in 1989. The club created a Head of The Mersey race before its landmark Lottery Grant. Training time and facilities were given to Bridgewater High School and then Lymm High School.

The third and current boathouse and clubhouse were commissioned in 2012.

The club has produced eight national champion crews, with the most recent being at the 2025 British Rowing Club Championships.

== Honours ==
=== British champions ===
| Year | Winning crew/s |
|---|---|
| 1992 | Women J15 2x |
| 2010 | Women J15 2x |
| 2011 | Women J16 2x |
| 2013 | Women J14 1x |
| 2014 | Women J15 1 x |
| 2016 | Open J16 4x, Open J18 2x |
| 2018 | Open J18 4x |
| 2025 | Women club 4x- |

== Notable members ==
- Andrew Collier (b.1939) (Gen. Sec.: Soc. Educ. Officers; Schools Adjudicator)
- Lucy Glover (b.1998)
