= York City Rowing Club =

Rowing club in York, England

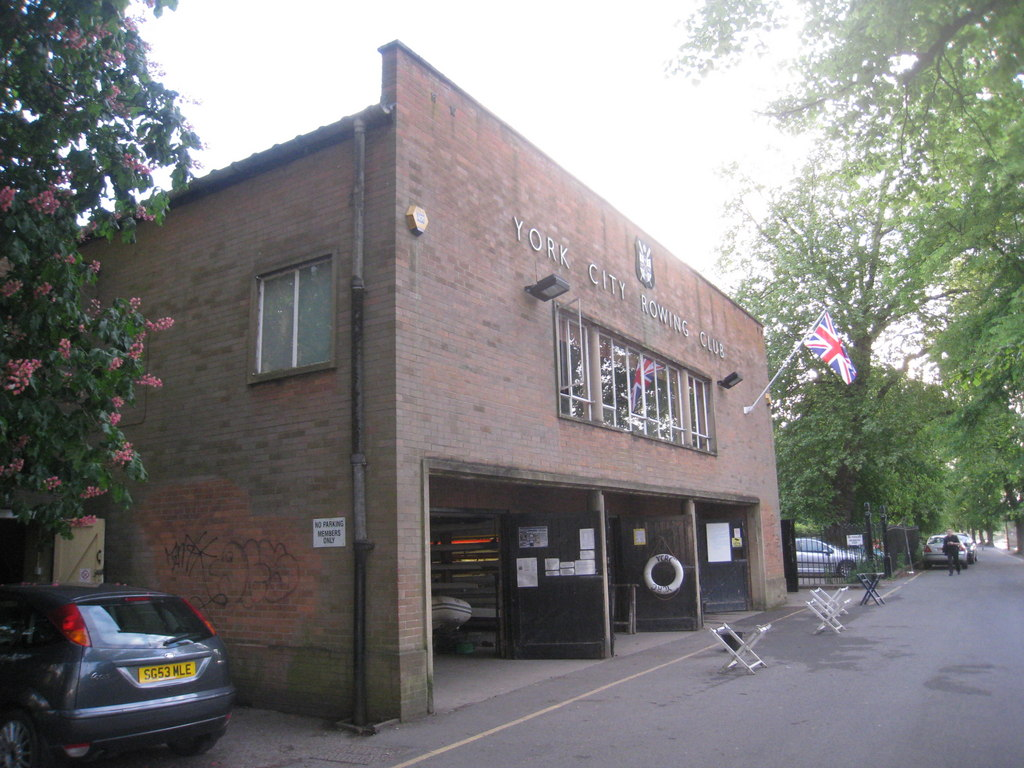

- Location: York, England
- Coordinates: 53.9598°N 1.0907°W
- Home water: River Ouse
- Established: October 1843
- Key people: Caroline Sherlock (President); Gregory Pipe (Chairman)
- Membership: 200
- Colors: Purple, black and gold
- Affiliations: British Rowing boat code YRK
- Website: www.ycrc.co.uk

Events
- Yorkshire Head (Spring); York Spring Regatta; York Summer Regatta; York Autumn Sculls (September); York Small Boats Head (November)

York City Rowing Club is a rowing club by the River Ouse in York, England. It has over 200 members, of all ages. The boathouse is on the west (here briefly south) bank of the river next to Lendal Bridge and in Memorial Gardens. The club has modern buildings but is three years older than the oldest coastal rowing club in Britain, Dover; it is 25 years younger than the oldest non-academic rowing club, Leander. The reach of canalised river it enjoys is unusually long – over 20 mi (32 km).

== History ==
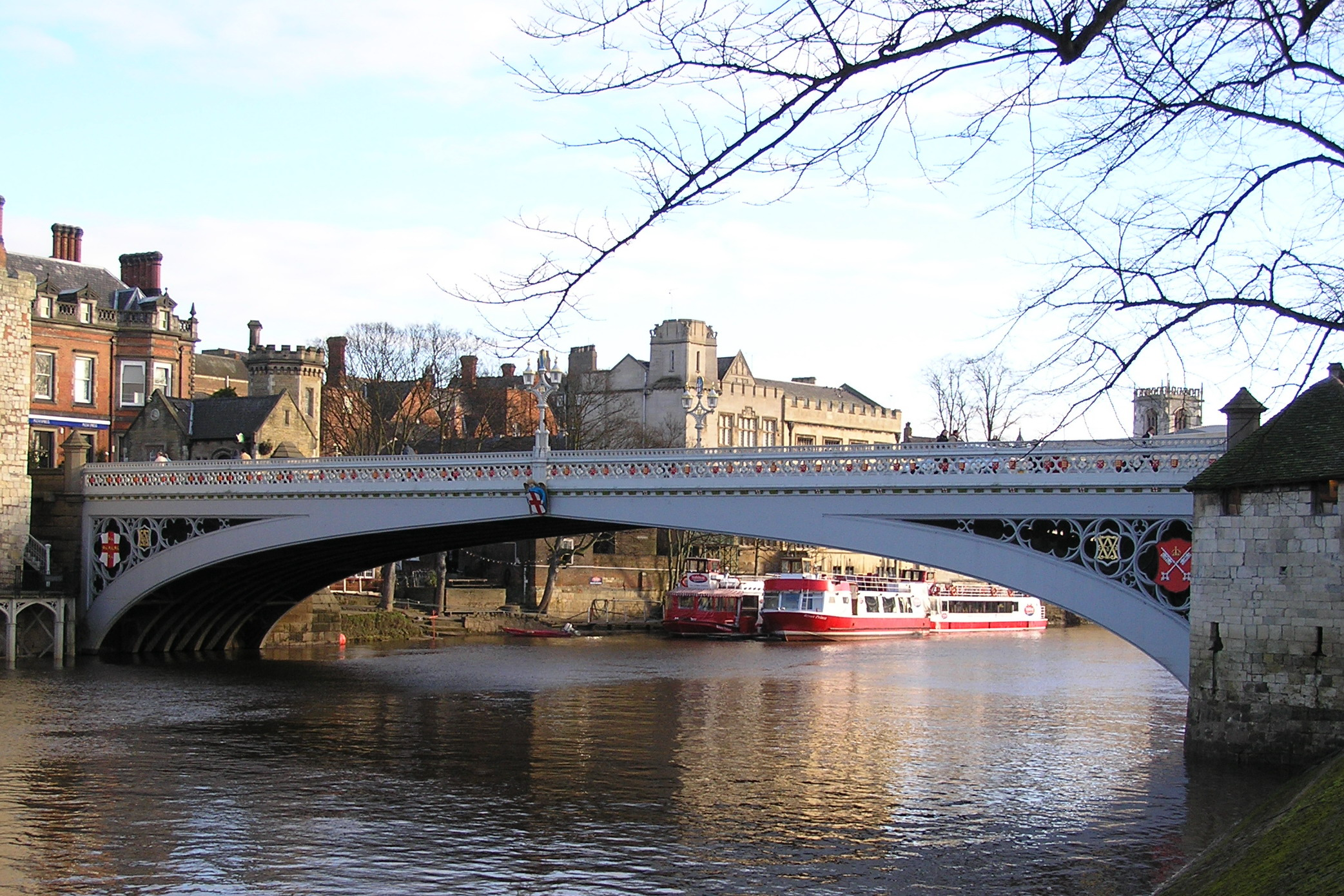
Lendal Bridge from the South Bank, looking downstream

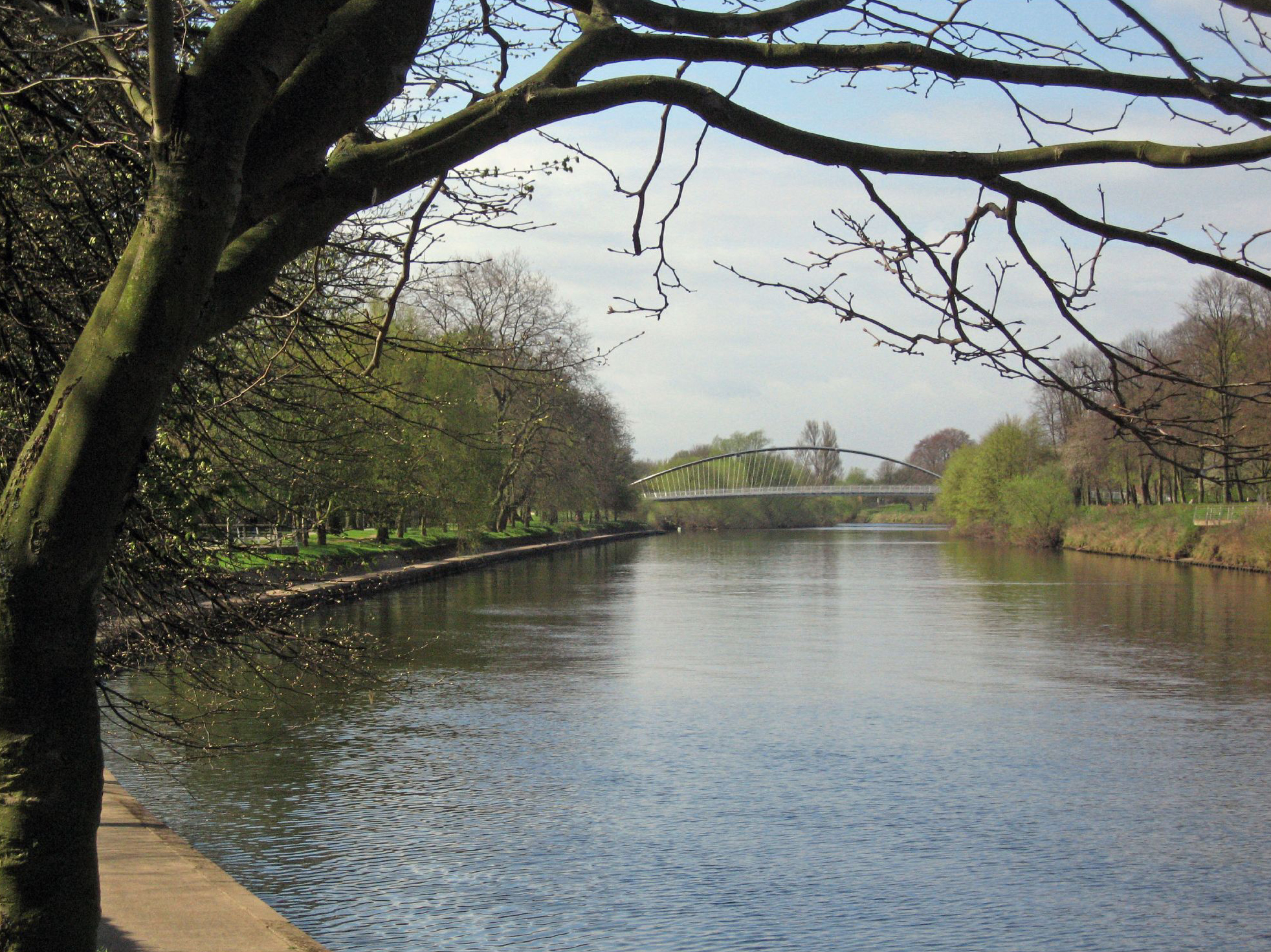
The Ouse in York

The present boathouse is a postwar building. Its boat storage is overcrowded owing to the size of the club and the level of activity. A refurbishment plan is underway, and it is hoped to update also the changing facilities, gym and bar/lounge.

== Location ==
The clubhouse is next to Lendal Bridge along West Esplanade. It is by the Ouse – over 20 mi (32 km) of rowable water; upstream from the boathouse the river is winding, in places quite narrow, and is rowable as far as Linton Lock. This stretch is almost free from recreational and commercial traffic. The public footpath and cycle (towpath) is between the river and boathouse. Wildlife encountered includes herons, kingfishers, otters and at least one seal. Downstream the river is wider with less severe bends, but is less interesting and, especially in summer, is sometimes congested with excursion craft, cabin cruisers and hired motor-boats. Many of the bridges are single-span.

== Club colours ==
These are white, with a narrow band each of purple, black and gold diagonally.

== Events ==
The club runs or assists with five events throughout the year, including 2 heads and 3 regattas.

=== Heads ===
- Yorkshire Head (a Yorkshire Rowing Council event in Spring)

This is raced from a start near the A1237 road bridge to a finish near the club. Landmarks on the course are: Maddies' Landing (a derelict wharf once serving the old mental hospital at Clifton), Clifton Bends and Bridge (a sharp S-bend under a road bridge), St. Peter's School boathouse on stroke-side about 800 m from the finish and finally (with 200 m to go) the Scarborough Bridge carrying a railway across the river.

- Autumn Sculls (in September)

Started in 2015 to provide early season head racing in small boats. The course is 4,500m downstream from Rawcliffe Landing near the bypass bridge to just above Scarborough Railway Bridge in the city centre. Landmarks include Maddies' Landing (a derelict wharf once serving the old mental hospital at Clifton) and Clifton Bends and Bridge (a sharp S-bend under a road bridge).

- Small Boats Head (in November)

A shorter course, upstream from a point at Fulford upstream of the A64 road bridge to a finish at the King's Staithe. The course passes York University boathouse on rowers' left, under the Millennium foot-bridge then passes the confluence of the R. Fosse, also on bow-side, shortly before the finish.

=== Regattas ===
- Spring regatta

Beginning at or close to St Peter's steps, and finishing close to York City Rowing Club's landing stage - in all, the course is roughly 850 metres (2,790 ft).

- Summer regatta

=== Former events ===
- Sprint regatta

Beginning at Leeds University Steps, and finishing close to York City Rowing Club's landing stage - in all, the course is roughly 500 metres (1,600 ft). This regatta was discontinued in 2012 due to the lack of interest.

== In the media ==
York City Rowing Club is featured often in the York Press. Recently, they have written two articles about York City Rowing Club, one about a grant received, and another about an elderly rower (a former Olympian).

== Honours ==
=== Henley Royal Regatta ===
Year	Races won
2007	Britannia Challenge Cup

=== British champions ===
Year	Winning crew/s
1976	Women J18 1x
2006	Open L1x
2008	J16 Mens Quad Sculls
