= City of Bristol Rowing Club =

British rowing club

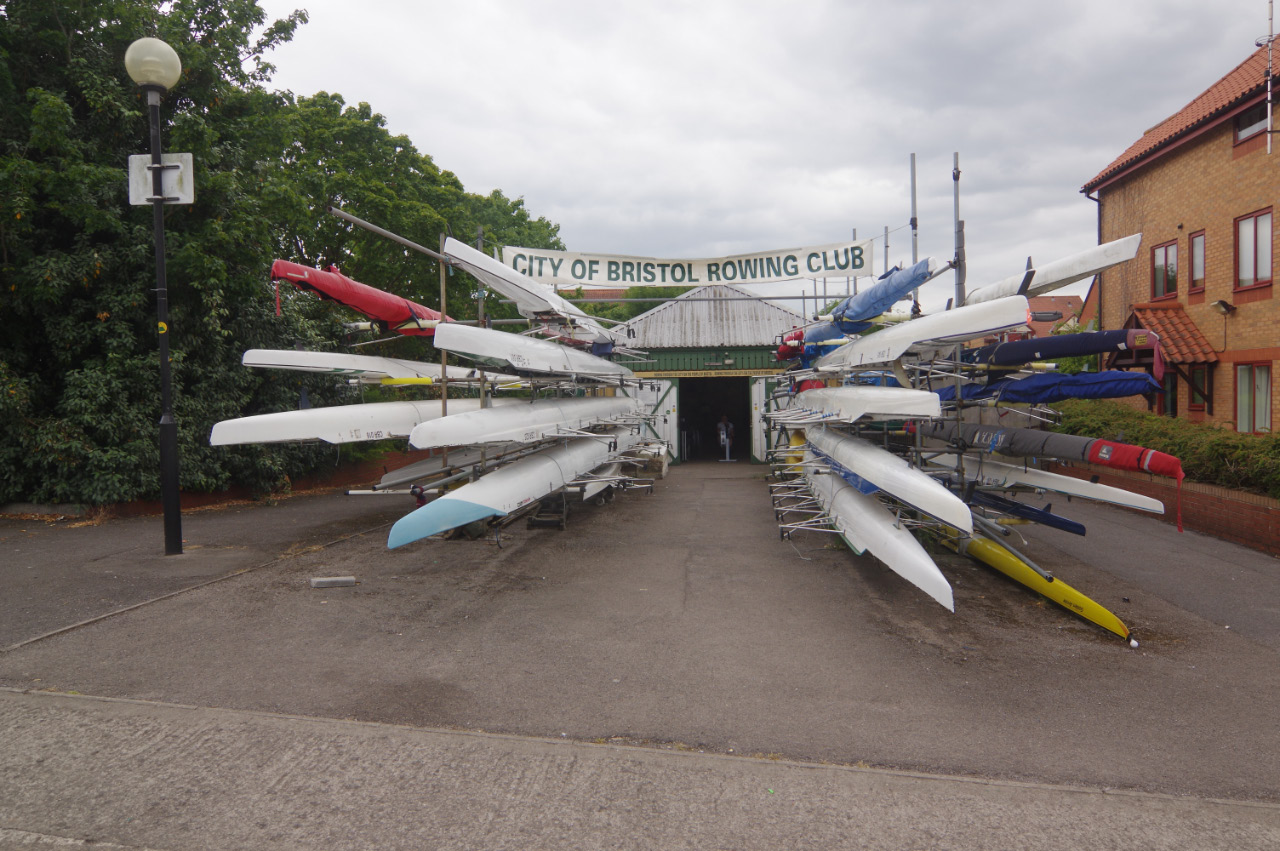

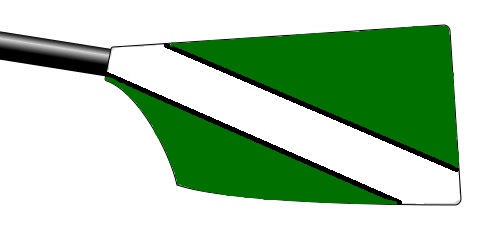
- Location: The Boathouse, Albion Dockside Estate, Hanover Place, Bristol, England
- Coordinates: 51.447925°N 2.611936°W
- Affiliations: British Rowing (boat code CBR)
- Website: www.bristolrowing.co.uk

City of Bristol Rowing Club is a rowing club on the Bristol Harbour next to River Avon, based at The Boathouse, Albion Dockside Estate, Hanover Place, Bristol, England. The club has facilities for all age groups.

== History ==
The club was formed in 1952 as a docker's club. In 1987, two of the club's boats and the boat trailer were destroyed following a M5 motorway crash.

The club and produced British champion crews in 2015, when the under-14 quadruple coxed sculls won the national title and in 2024.

The club won titles at the 2024 British Rowing Championships and at the 2025 British Rowing Club Championships.

=== British champions ===
Year	Winning crew/s
2015	Open J14 4x+
2024	Women J14 4x+
2025	Women J15 1x
