= Gloucester Rowing Club =

British rowing club

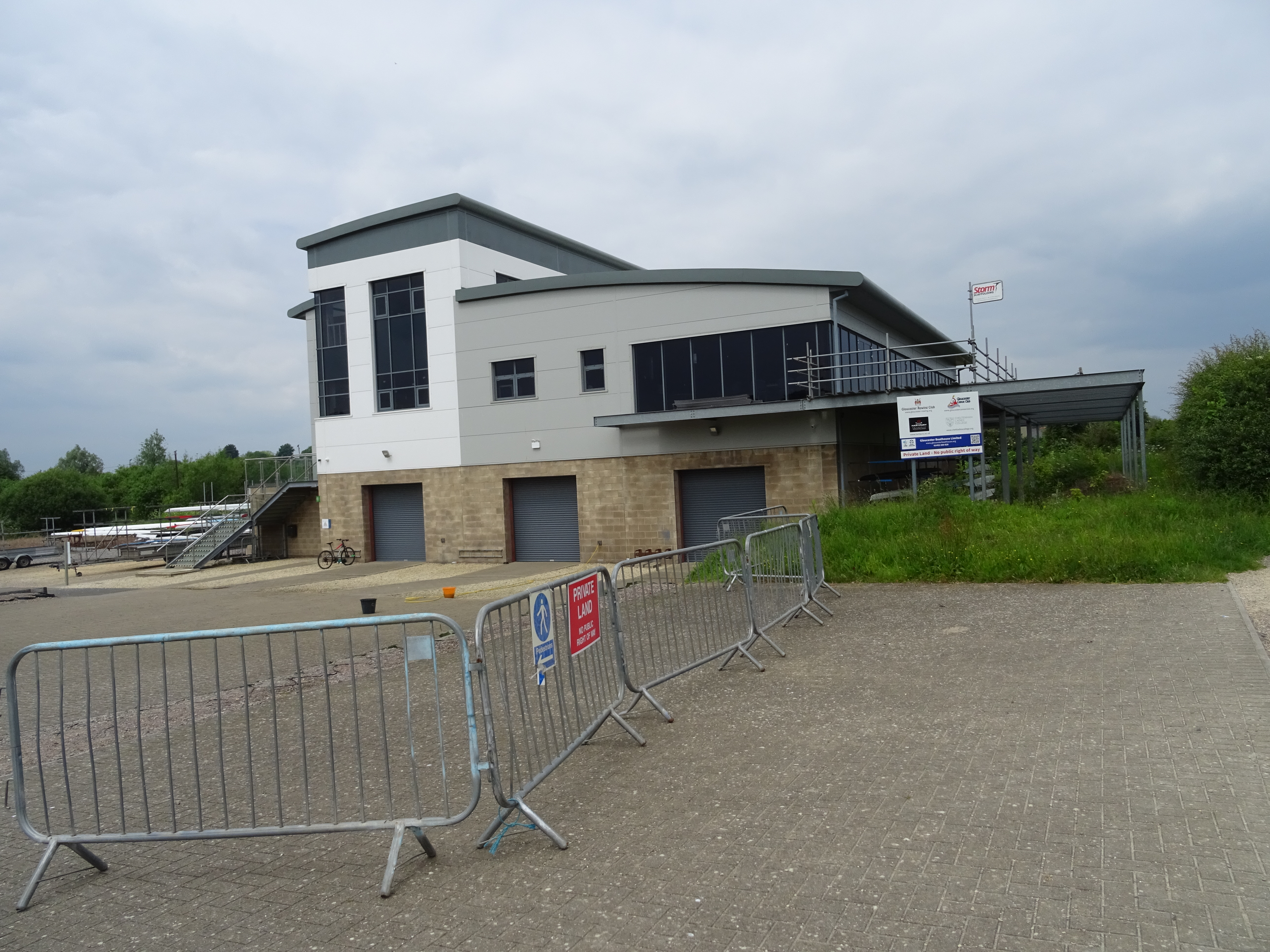

- Location: Gloucester Boathouse, David Hook Way, Hempsted, Gloucester, England
- Coordinates: 51.843909°N 2.267399°W
- Home water: Gloucester and Sharpness Canal
- Founded: 1846
- Affiliations: British Rowing boat code - GLR
- Website: grc-dev-org.stackstaging.com

Gloucester Rowing Club is a rowing club on the Gloucester-Purton canal based at Gloucester Boathouse, David Hook Way, Hempsted, Gloucester.

== History ==
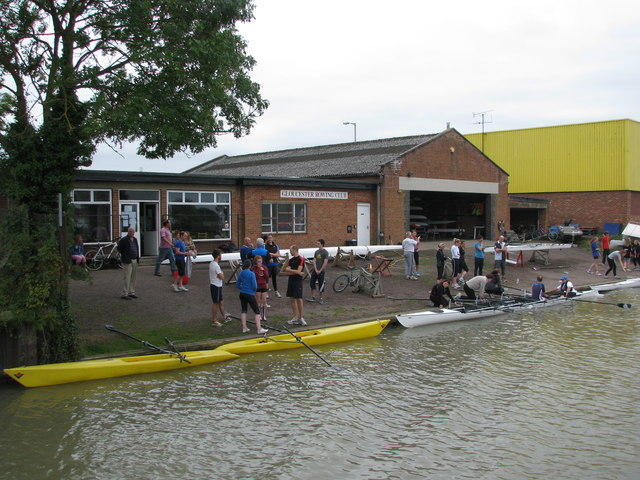
The old boathouse in 2013

The club was founded in 1846, making it one of the oldest rowing clubs in the United Kingdom.

In 2010 Gloucester Rowing Club and Hartpury College set up a centre to enable Hartpury students to participate in one of the Great Britain's rowing team centres. In the relationship the students become members of the Gloucester Rowing Club where they access the rowing facilities. In return the senior rowers from the club are able to access the training facilities at the college. The relationship has brought significant success at national and international level.

In 2017, the club moved to a new boathouse from 326 Bristol Road to the other side of the river near David Hook Way. The facility owned by a charity called Gloucester Boathouse Ltd aimed to raise £2 million to enable all of Gloucestershires's river sports organisations to have a home.

In 2018 Hartpury College gained University status which led to the formation of its own Hartpury University and College Boat Club in 2021 and severing its joint relationship with Gloucester RC.

In 2023 the old boathouse was taken over by a holiday river cruise company.

== Honours ==
=== British champions ===
Year	Winning crew/s
1997	Men J16 4x, Women J15 2x, Women J15 4x+
1998	Women J15 4x+
1999	Women 4-, Women 4+
2000	Women J18 2-, Women J18 8+
2003	Women J14 1x
2004	Women J15 1x
2005	Women 4-
2009	Women J18 4-
2011	Open L1x
2019	Open J15 1x
2021	Women J16 2x

=== Henley Royal Regatta ===
Year	Races won
2010	Princess Grace Challenge Cup
2014	Princess Grace Challenge Cup
