= List of rowing boat manufacturers =

A list of rowing boat manufacturers that build for the world's rowing community.

== Racing ==
- Burgashell (still in business August 2024)
- Carl Douglas Racing Shells
- Cucchietti
- Empacher
- Falcon racing
- Filippi Boats
- Fluidesign
- Hudson Boatworks
- Janousek Racing Boats
- John Waugh Racing Boats
- Laszlo Boats NZ
- Levator Boatworks
- Liangjin Boat
- Kanghua
- King Racing Shells
- Maas Rowing Shells
- Nelo Rowing
- Peinert
- Pocock Racing Shells
- Race 1 Australia
- Roseman
- Rowing Sport Boats (RS boats)
- Salani (company)|Salani
- Schellenbacher
- SL Racing
- Stämpfli Racing Boats
- Swift Racing
- Sykes Racing
- Van Dusen
- Vega
- Vespoli
- WinTech Racing

== Recreational ==
The following are the most commonly used recreational sliding seat shell manufacturers in current use:

- Baumgarten Bootsbau
- C-Line
- Echo Rowing
- Edon Sculling Boats
- Gig Harbor Boat Works
- Leo Coastal Rowing
- LiteBoat
- Little River Marine
- Maas Boat Company
- Peinert Boat
- 1 Australia (wavecutter)
- Rowing Sport Boats (RS boats)
- Virus
- Volans
- Whitehall Rowing
- Roeiwerf Wiersma
- Vicente Dors

== Former manufacturers ==
These manufacturers formerly built rowing boats but have now ceased production.

- Aylings later became Lola Aylings
- H. C. Banham
- BBG Bootsbau Berlin
- John Clasper
- Colley
- Carbocraft
- Dirigo
- Drew Harrison Racing
- Edwin Phelps (Putney, London, UK)
- Eton Racing Boats (ERB)
- Euro Diffusions
- Flying Dragon Boat Co (Huangzhou, China)
- George Sharrow Racing Shells
- Harris Racing Boats, formerly George Harris Racing Boats (Iffley, Oxford, UK)
- Hi-Tech Racing Boats
- Lola Aylings
- Karlisch
- Kaschper Racing Shells
- Kiwi International Rowing Skiffs (KIRS)
- Owen
- Pirsch (Friedrich Pirsch Bootswerft, Berlin-Spandau, Germany)
- Radley
- Resolute Racing Shells
- Frederick Rough
- Salter Bros
- Sargent & Burton
- Searle
- George Sims and Sons (Putney)
- Sims (Hammersmith)
- Swaddle and Winship
- Helmut Schoenbrod
- Ray Sims, Eric Sims, et al.
- J Sutton
- Mat Taylor
- Worcester Oar & Paddle (Joe Garafolo)

== See also ==
- Racing shell
