= Atlanta Rowing Club =

Coordinates: 34.002564°N 84.362727°W

ARC Logo.

Atlanta Rowing Club (ARC) is a non-profit 501(c)(4) masters rowing club located in Roswell, Georgia. ARC's colors are red and white. As a masters organization, it is the only club in the Atlanta area for rowers who are beyond high school or college age, although there are several members who are in college. The club is a volunteer-based organization with 200+ members throughout the year.

ARC conducts three four-week-long Learn-to-Row sessions each year. The classes teach people new to rowing how to row. ARC also hosts a National Learn-to-Row day where people can try rowing for one day at no cost.

ARC has 3 buildings for storing boats; a large building mostly housing eights, fours and quads, a cage holding singles, doubles, and pairs, and a small building holding private singles. There is also an erg room, kitchen and bathroom in the main boathouse.

== History ==
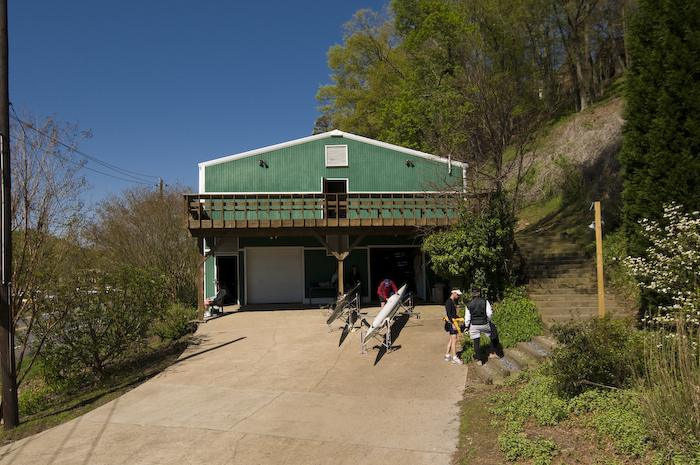
ARC's Main Boathouse, front view

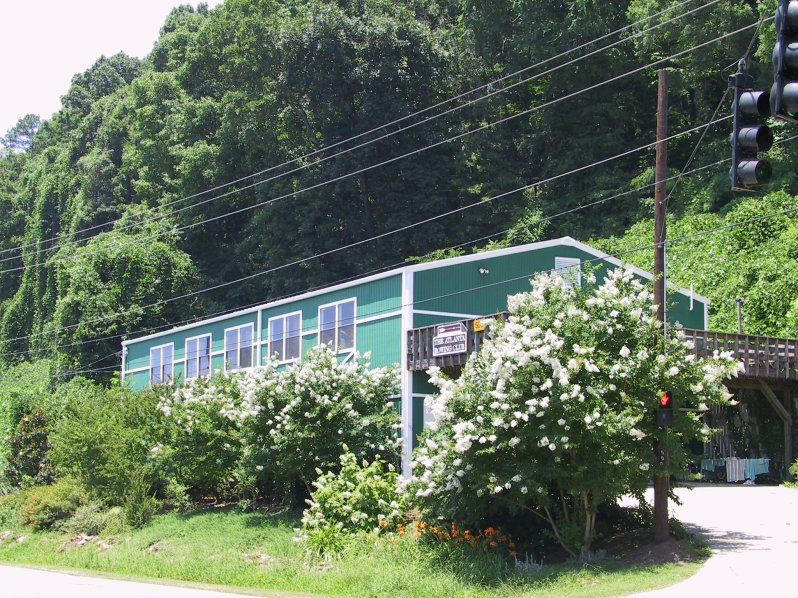
ARC's Main Boathouse, side view

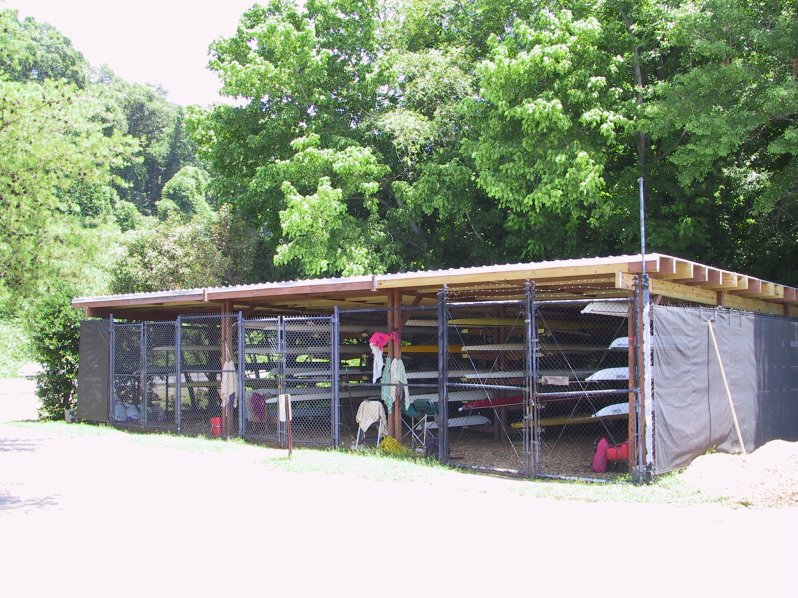
Cage housing singles and doubles.

Founded in 1974, the club was initially located on the lake at Stone Mountain. By 1982 membership had grown and the club obtained the use of a small building and dock at the Chattahoochee River Park. By 1989 the main boathouse was constructed where it presently stands along Azalea Drive, across from the Chattahoochee River.

== Notable members ==
- Jeffery Koplan - Former director of the Centers for Disease Control and Prevention (CDC), and currently vice president for academic health affairs Emory University in Atlanta, Georgia.
- Norton Schlachter - One of the first members and officers of the Atlanta Rowing Club in the early 70s. He was a USRowing board member and later Chairman of the US Men’s Olympic Committee. He was the first Southerner and youngest Chairman at the time.
- Daniel Wolff - French Junior National Champion in doubles sculls racing.
- John and Lyn Wylder - 1 of 3 couples in the world that are both International Rowing Federation (FISA) referees.

== Board ==
The club's activities are managed by its board of directors and are governed by its By-laws. An election is held in January of each year to vote on the Board's five officers. Board meetings are held once a month to manage the club's business.

== Boats ==
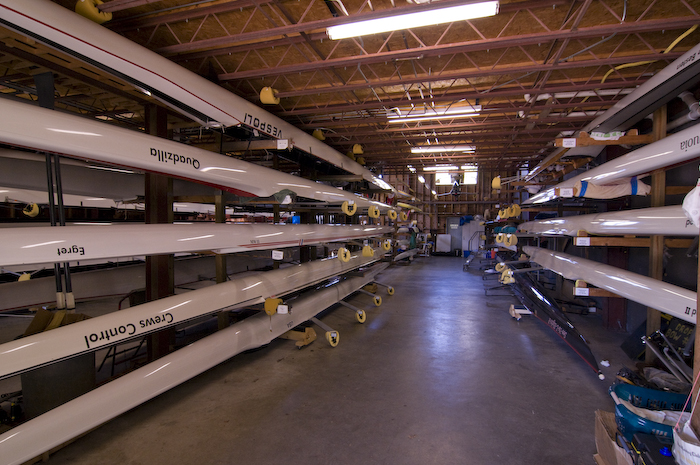
Boats inside main boathouse.

ARC owns 30 rowing shells that can be used by its members. In addition to club boats 70 private shells are stored in the boathouse including shells from Georgia State University crew team.

List of Current Equipment:

Type	Manufacturer	Boat name	Year	Weight Class
1x	Maas	Party of One	1991	ALL
	Maas	Single Serving	1992	ALL
	Peinert	One Track Mind	1995	HWT
	Peinert	Aerodynamic	2004	HWT
	Peinert	Solitude	2003	LWT
	Burgashell	Starbuck	2000	MWT
	Burgashell	Ruthless	2001	MWT
	Burgashell	Seashell	1998	MWT
	Hudson	Happy Hour	2007	LWT
	Hudson	Solo Slide	2007	MWT
2-	BBG	Nur die Nesten	1990	HWT
2x	Wintech	Magnolia II	2005	HWT
	Kaschper	Phoenix	1997	HWT
	Kaschper	Kudzu	1998	MWT
	Kaschper	Double Trouble	2003	MWT
	Hudson	Sequoia	2004	HWT
	Hudson	Redwood	2006	HWT
2x/2-	Hudson	Heron	2006	LWT
2x/2-	Hudson	Dogwood II	2006	MWT
4+	Vespoli	Fortitude	2002	HWT
	Vespoli	Fourtune	2002	MWT
4x	Kaschper	Egret	1997	MWT
	Hudson	Quadzilla	2006	HWT
	Hudson	Crews Control	1999	MWT
4x/4-	Hudson	USA	2006	LWT
8+	Vespoli	Bear	1985	HWT
	Vespoli	Donohoe	2003	MWT
	Vespoli	Go Streight	1998	MWT
	Vespoli	-	-	HWT
	Vespoli	See Ya L-Eight-R	2004	LWT

Key - 1x = Single, 2- = Pair, 2x = Double, 2x/2- = Can be Rigged as either a Pair or Double, 4+ = Coxed Four, 4x = Quad, 4x/4- = Can be rigged as either a Coxless four or Quad, 8+ = Eight. For information about different types of boats see this article.

== Regatta ==
ARC, in conjunction with Lookout Rowing Club hosts the Head of the Hooch Regatta in Chattanooga, Tennessee. The Head of the Hooch has been held in two other locations throughout its 27-year history. It is the third largest regatta in the United States. The largest is the Head of the Charles in Boston, Massachusetts.
