= Amity Regional High School =

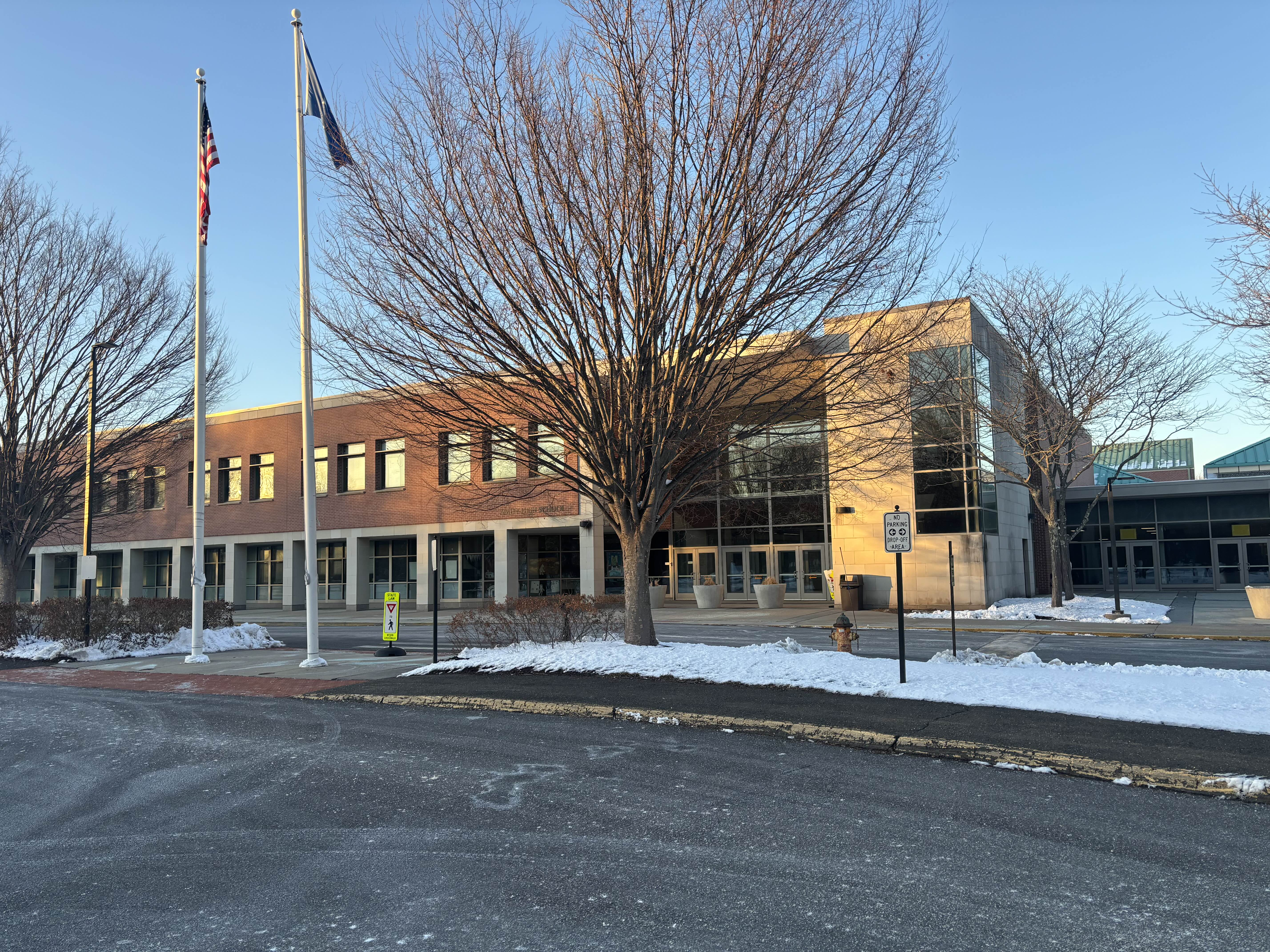
- Amity Regional High School in 2026

Location
- 25 Newton Road; Woodbridge, Connecticut 06525; United States; 41°21′25″N 73°00′38″W

Information
- School type: Public High School
- Established: 1954 (72 years ago)
- School district: Amity Regional School District #5
- Superintendent: Jennifer Byars
- CEEB code: 070965
- Principal: Andre Hauser
- Grades: 9–12
- Enrollment: 1,347 (2024-2025)
- Student to teacher ratio: 12:1
- Colors: Black and gold
- Athletics conference: SCC Housatonic Division
- Mascot: Spartans
- Rival: North Haven High School
- Publication: Calliope
- Newspaper: The Trident
- Yearbook: Embers
- Website: www.amityregion5.org/arhs

Amity Regional High School is a regional public high school in Woodbridge, Connecticut. The school serves students in grades 9–12 from Woodbridge, Orange, and Bethany, which comprise Regional School District #5. The name "Amity" derives from the friendship among the three towns in forming the district. During the 2024–2025 school year, it enrolled 1,347 students and had a student to teacher ratio of approximately 11 to 1.

The school originated from efforts by the three towns to establish a regional secondary education system after New Haven stopped accepting students from neighboring communities into its junior high schools. The district opened its junior division in September 1954 and its senior division in September 1955. The district's governing board was reapportioned in 1978 following a lawsuit over unequal representation among the three towns. In the early 2000s, the district experienced a financial crisis marked by a substantial budget deficit and repeated voter rejections of proposed budgets.

Amity's athletic teams, known as the Spartans, compete in the Southern Connecticut Conference and have won state championships in several sports. The baseball program won seven Connecticut Interscholastic Athletic Conference championships between 2006 and 2024 under head coach Sal Coppola. The school's theater program has received three Best Musical awards at the Stephen Sondheim Awards, for productions of The Addams Family (2018), Anastasia (2021), and My Fair Lady (2026).

== History ==
=== Establishment and early years ===
The formation of Amity Regional School District No. 5 resulted from New Haven's 1953 decision to stop accepting out-of-town students in its junior high schools. Facing this development, Woodbridge, Orange, and Bethany began studying options for a regional high school in 1950. Following separate referendums in the three towns, a Regional Board of Education with three representatives from each town was established on March 6, 1953.

The junior unit opened in September 1954, with the senior unit following in September 1955. The Regional Board assumed responsibility for grades seven through twelve as of September 1954. The superintendent, initially supplied by the state, supervised both the regional school and the elementary schools of the three towns. Under the original structure, the Regional Board set the budget after a public hearing, and individual towns could not alter it.

==== Baker v. Regional High School District No. 5 ====
The equal three-member representation from each town persisted from 1953 through the mid-1970s. In 1974, residents of Orange filed a lawsuit, Baker v. Regional High School District No. 5, challenging this structure as violating the "one person, one vote" principle under the Equal Protection Clause. The U.S. District Court agreed, finding the apportionment unconstitutional due to vote dilution in Orange, the largest town. The Second Circuit Court of Appeals affirmed this decision.

In response, the Connecticut General Assembly passed Public Act 75-644 in July 1975, requiring regional districts to adopt constitutionally compliant apportionment. Amity's District Reapportionment Committee proposed a plan where nine Board members would be elected at large with a residency requirement of three from each town. The State Board of Education rejected this "3-3-3 plan" in December 1976, but the U.S. District Court found it constitutional in May 1977. Judge Jon O. Newman wrote that the plan "on its face is consistent with the one person-one vote standards of the Fourteenth Amendment." Voters rejected this plan in a January 17, 1978 referendum.

The committee then developed the "7-4-2 Plan," expanding the Board to 13 members: seven from Orange, four from Woodbridge, and two from Bethany, based on population proportions. The plan included a safeguard preventing action based solely on a majority from either Orange alone or from Bethany and Woodbridge combined. The State Board of Education approved this structure, and voters ratified it on September 25, 1978. This structure remains in effect.

=== Campus development ===
The original building served until the early 1990s, when most of the campus was rebuilt. The auditorium and gymnasium from the original structure remained.

After the 1990s construction, mold and ventilation problems affected parts of the facility. The auditorium closed in 2003 and was demolished and replaced with a new facility in 2007.

In March 2002, an investigation revealed that the district faced a budget deficit of $2.8 million caused by financial mismanagement. The crisis severely strained relations between the district and the three communities. Residents rejected seventeen consecutive budget proposals during the 2002–2003 fiscal year before finally approving a spending plan.

Until 2005, the school served grades 10-12. Ninth-grade students attended junior high schools: Orange Junior High School for Orange residents, and Bethany Junior High School for Bethany and Woodbridge residents. In 2005, ninth graders moved to the regional high school, and the junior high schools became middle schools for grades 7–8.

In April 2010, Sue Cantin, a former district office secretary, pleaded no contest to misdemeanor charges of embezzling $107,512 in student activity funds over several years. She was ordered to repay the full amount by April 2012.

=== Recent leadership ===
In June 2022, the Board of Education appointed Andre Hauser as principal, effective July 14, 2022. Hauser previously served as principal of Waterford High School for nine years and earned recognition as Connecticut Assistant Principal of the Year earlier in his career. He succeeded the previous administration that had led the school through the challenges of the COVID-19 pandemic.

In February 2024, a large turnout ensued at a Board of Education meeting after a student-led protest occurred in the main office over military presence and the behavior of administrators. Community members, including students and parents, attended the meeting to discuss the issues.

== Athletics ==
The athletic teams, known as the Spartans and Lady Spartans, compete in the Housatonic Division of the Southern Connecticut Conference.

=== Baseball ===
The baseball team won its first Housatonic League title in 1987. The team has won CIAC Class LL state championships in 2006, 2007, 2013, 2014, 2015, 2016, and 2024.

Head coach Sal Coppola retired in September 2025 after serving from 1994 to 2025. He finished with 588 wins and seven state championships, a Connecticut record. As of January 2026, Amity ranks third in the state for baseball championships, behind Plainville (8) and Waterford (11).

=== Football ===
The football team won the CIAC Class LL championship in 1978.

=== Volleyball ===
The girls' volleyball team has won CIAC Class L championships in 1981, 1982, 1983, 1985, 1986, 1989, 1990, 1994, 1995, 2003, and Class LL in 2018.

=== Tennis ===
The boys' tennis team has won CIAC Class LL state championships in 1987 and 2004. Under head coach Chris Raffone, the program has a record of 255-42 and four SCC tournament championships.

=== Other sports ===
The softball team has won CIAC Class LL championships in 2001, 2002, 2003, 2005, 2012, and 2018.

The boys' cross country team has won CIAC championships in Class LL (2005, 2010, 2014, 2015) and Class L (1991, 1996, 2008, 2025). The girls' cross country team won Class L championships in 1988 and 1989. Both indoor and outdoor track teams have won multiple state titles.

The boys' ice hockey team won CIAC Division II state championships in 2008 and 2010.

In 2006, the girls' soccer team shared the Class LL state championship with Trumbull High School after a 0-0 draw in double overtime.

=== Championship summary ===
All CIAC State Championship Wins
Sport	Class	Year(s)
Baseball	LL	2006, 2007, 2013, 2014, 2015, 2016, 2024
Basketball (girls)	LL	1980
Cross country (boys)	L	1991, 1996, 2008, 2025
Cross country (boys)	LL	2005, 2010, 2014, 2015
Cross country (girls)	L	1988, 1989
Field hockey	L	1995
Football	LL	1978
Golf (boys)	N/A	1961, 1972
Golf (boys)	M	1962
Golf (boys)	I	1978, 1996
Ice Hockey (boys)	II	2008, 2010
Soccer (girls)	LL	2006 (Co-champions with Trumbull)
Softball	LL	2001, 2002, 2003, 2005, 2012, 2018
Swimming (boys)	L	1999
Tennis (boys)	LL	1987, 2004, 2015
Track and field (indoor, boys)	LL	2005, 2006
Track and field (indoor, boys)	Open	2006
Track and field (indoor, boys)	L	2009
Track and field (indoor, girls)	L	1998
Track and field (indoor, girls)	LL	2005
Track and field (outdoor, boys)	LL	2000, 2010
Track and field (outdoor, boys)	L	2009
Volleyball (girls)	L	1981, 1982, 1983, 1985, 1986, 1989, 1990, 1994, 1995, 2003
Volleyball (girls)	LL	2018

== Performing arts ==
=== Music ===
The music department includes concert band, wind ensemble, strings, and choir. Groups perform in holiday concerts, spring concerts, and the annual POPS concert, established in 1969.

The school operated a competitive marching band from 2007 to 2009, performing shows based on Pirates of the Caribbean (2007) and Cirque du Soleil's La Nouba (2008). In 2010, the program changed to "Music in Motion," a staged performance inspired by Blast! incorporating marching, jazz, drumline, colorguard, and dance.

=== Theater ===
The Board of Education created a theater department in 2007 with courses in acting, technical theater, and dance. The program opened with a production of The Laramie Project in the new auditorium.

Productions have won awards including the Moss Hart Award for Best High School Production (The Boys Next Door, 2008), four Connecticut High School Musical Theater Awards (Les Misérables, 2010), eight awards including Best Musical (Sweeney Todd, 2013), and Best Musical at the inaugural Stephen Sondheim Awards (The Addams Family, 2018, Anastasia, 2021, and My Fair Lady, 2026).

In 2009, Amity was the first Connecticut high school to perform Rent: School Edition.

Recent play productions include The Play That Goes Wrong (2022), Love/Sick (2023), The Minutes (2024), and Prelude to a Kiss (2025).

Recent musical productions include Mamma Mia! (2022), Beauty and the Beast (2023), Mean Girls (2024), and The Little Mermaid (2025). The spring 2026 production is My Fair Lady.

Grace Lupoli was selected to represent the Stephen Sondheim Awards at the 2023 Jimmy Awards in New York City, where she performed as a featured soloist.

== Academic competitions ==
=== Debate ===
The debate team has competed in the International Public Policy Forum (IPPF). In 2019-2020, the team reached the Elite Eight finals as the only Connecticut team in the Sweet 16. The competition was canceled due to COVID-19; the team received $2,500. In 2021-2022, the team again reached the Elite Eight and advanced to the semifinals in New York City, finishing in the top four internationally and receiving $3,000.

The team won multiple Connecticut Debate Association competitions from 2017 to 2020, with the most state finals qualifiers in 2019 and 2020.

=== Other competitions ===
The Math Team won first in the Large School Division of the CT State Association of Mathematics Leagues competition in 2023 and 2024. The Academic Decathlon Team received Rookie of the Year at the national competition in Frisco, Texas, in April 2023, with six individual medals in Essay, Science, and Interview.

The student newspaper, The Trident, placed first for two consecutive years among schools with 1,000-1,700 students in the American Scholastic Press Association competition. At the Connecticut Science and Engineering Fair in March 2023, ten of 18 Amity Science Research students became finalists and earned over $95,000 in scholarships.

=== Quiz bowl ===
In 1980, a three-student team won the inaugural Connecticut High School Bowl, produced by WTNH and Albertus Magnus College. The show ran from 1980 to 1991.

The school revived its quiz bowl program in 2006 as the academic challenge team, participating in Connecticut's version of The Challenge on News 12 Networks. In May 2009, the team reached the state quarterfinals, losing to eventual champion Greens Farms Academy.

== Notable alumni ==
- William Atherton, actor; known for roles as Richard Thornburg in Die Hard and Walter Peck in Ghostbusters
- Chris Antonetti, president of baseball operations for the Cleveland Guardians
- John J. DeGioia, first lay president of Georgetown University
- Kristen Marie Griest, one of the first two female U.S. Army Rangers
- Darren M. Haynes, SportsCenter anchor at ESPN
- Dorit Kemsley, cast member of The Real Housewives of Beverly Hills
- Derek Mitchell, former United States Ambassador to Burma
- Martha S. Pope, first female sergeant-at-arms of the United States Senate
- David L. Rabinowitz, research scientist at Yale University and co-discoverer of several centaurs
- Jonathan Rothberg, founder and former chairman of 454 Life Sciences and inventor of techniques for sequencing the human genome
- Alan Schlesinger, Connecticut Republican candidate for U.S. Senate
- Erik Stocklin, actor known for role as Patrick Mooney in Haters Back Off
- Mike Vespoli, founder and CEO of Vespoli USA, a boat manufacturer
- Brian Yale, bassist for Matchbox Twenty
