= Head of the Hooch =

Annual race

- The Head of the Hooch Regatta logo
- Date: First Weekend of November
- Location: Chattanooga
- Event type: Head
- Distance: 3.1 miles (5.0 km)
- Primary sponsor: Outdoor Chattanooga
- Established: 1981
- Website: www.headofthehooch.org
- Participants: 2,100 entries; ~200 clubs

The Head of the Hooch Regatta, previously known as the Head of the Chattahoochee Regatta, is a 2-day rowing regatta held annually on the first full (Saturday and Sunday in the same month) weekend in November in Chattanooga, Tennessee. The head race is currently run downstream on a 3.1-mile (5.0 km) course on the Tennessee River. It presently ranks as one of the largest rowing regattas in the United States with over 10,000 rowers and over 2,100 boats entered for the 2014 event. 1,245 boats raced on one day in the 2012 competition, more than any other US regatta on a single day.

The event is currently co-hosted by the Atlanta Rowing Club and the Lookout Rowing Club. The St. Andrews Rowing Club is also a major partner providing assistance with the set up and operation of the regatta. The Hooch organization is 100% volunteers, with no paid staff.

The Hooch has been recognized as one of the most laid back and hospitable regattas in the country by Rowing News Magazine.

Competitors each year come from over 30 states and several foreign countries. The athletes’ ages span from high school crews to adult masters rowers aged 80 and above. The regatta runs a comprehensive list of events with men's, women's, and mixed boats in youth (high school), novice, college and club, varsity collegiate, championship, and masters categories.

== History ==
Overlooking the grandstand and finish area at the 2008 Head of the Hooch

In 1981, the Atlanta Rowing Club organized a head race on the Chattahoochee River, in front of their boathouse in Roswell, Georgia. The first race hosted only 105 boats. As word spread the regatta drew increasing numbers of rowers each year to the beautiful Roswell, GA venue on the Chattahoochee River. By 1998 almost 500 boats raced in one day. The wait at the docks to launch and recover was becoming too long and trailers were stacked up in the park and on both sides of the adjacent Azalea Drive for more than a half-mile. Clearly the regatta had outgrown the site.

In November 1997, the regatta moved from Roswell to the 1996 Olympic rowing venue in Gainesville, Georgia. Following the move, the number of boats raced at the Hooch grew annually by 15-20%. While the Olympic Venue was and is an exceptional racecourse, by 2004 Hooch regatta attendance was overwhelming available hotel and restaurant facilities in the nearby town of Gainesville, GA. In 2004, over 1000 boats raced and the regatta began looking for alternate venues to accommodate further growth.

In 2004, Chattanooga, Tennessee had just completed a $120 million renovation of their downtown waterfront area, designed to accommodate events with large numbers of participants and spectators. The Head of the Chattahoochee committee approached Lookout Rowing Club, local to Chattanooga, along with the City of Chattanooga, to explore the prospect of conducting the regatta there on the Tennessee River. In 2005, the Head of the Chattahoochee Regatta changed its name to Head of the Hooch Regatta and held the event for the first time in Chattanooga. The new venue was an instant success. The appeal and convenience of a regatta in the downtown area of a city like Chattanooga was undeniable. Rowers and spectators could walk from the venue to hotels and restaurants. In addition, the city offered many nearby attractions for non-rowing members and spectators. The race ends at Ross's Landing Park in downtown Chattanooga.

In 2015, the Hooch accepted over 2100 entries over the two-day regatta. The Hooch currently ranks as one of the largest head races (in number of boats raced) in North America, along with the Head of the Charles in Cambridge, Massachusetts and the Head of the Fish in Saratoga Springs, New York.

A virtual race is planned in 2020.

== Row for the Cure ==
Every team attending the Hooch is encouraged to hold a Row for the Cure fundraiser prior to the Hooch. Each team can raise money for the Komen for the Cure affiliate serving their local community in the fight against breast cancer. Fundraising also takes place during the regatta, with special women's races labeled as Row for the Cure events. Tens of thousands of dollars are raised each year.

== See also ==
- Regatta
