= Toby Cunliffe-Steel =

New Zealand athlete and advocate

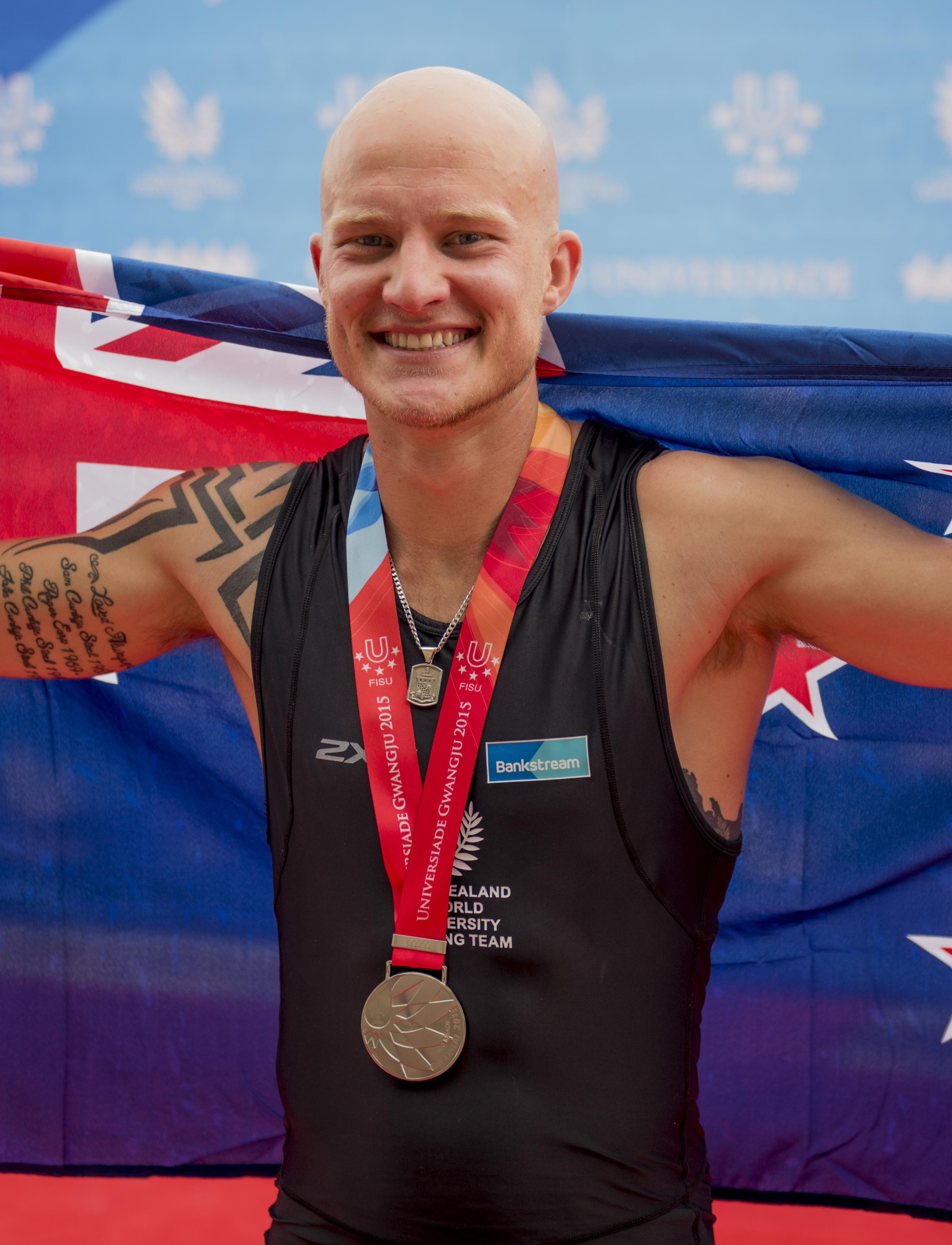

Personal information
- Born: Christchurch, New Zealand
- Height: 1.77 m (5 ft 10 in)
- Weight: 75 kg (165 lb)
- Life partner: Stephanie Upton

Sport
- Country: New Zealand
- Sport: Rowing
- Weight class: Lightweight
- Club: Waikato Rowing Club

Toby Cunliffe-Steel is a brain tumour survivor and former New Zealand rower turned sports administrator. He was diagnosed with a brain tumour in 2007 that was surgically removed in Starship Hospital. He started rowing the year before in 2006, was first selected for a New Zealand representative team in 2009, and continued to represent New Zealand internationally until 2016, which included being the first and only New Zealand rower to win a medal at a World Universiade, a global Olympic-style multi sport event in its then 28th edition. His international athletic career ended at the time of being diagnosed with Relative energy deficiency in sport in 2018. Outside of his career as an athlete, he holds a Master of Sport Management, has fulfilled various leadership and governance roles, and is an outspoken sports and athlete advocate.

== Early life, education, and work ==
Born in Christchurch, Cunliffe-Steel spent his early years in various locations across the North and South Islands of New Zealand, as well as a period residing in Papua New Guinea due to his father's service in the New Zealand Defence Force. He received his education from Matahui Road Primary School, Tauranga Intermediate, and Tauranga Boys' College. Encouraged by his parents, he participated in Gymnastics, Rugby, Cricket, Soccer, Volleyball, Netball, Inline Hockey, Basketball, Swimming, Cross Country and Athletics and reached a regional representational level in Water polo. He was elected Head Prefect of Tauranga Boys' College.

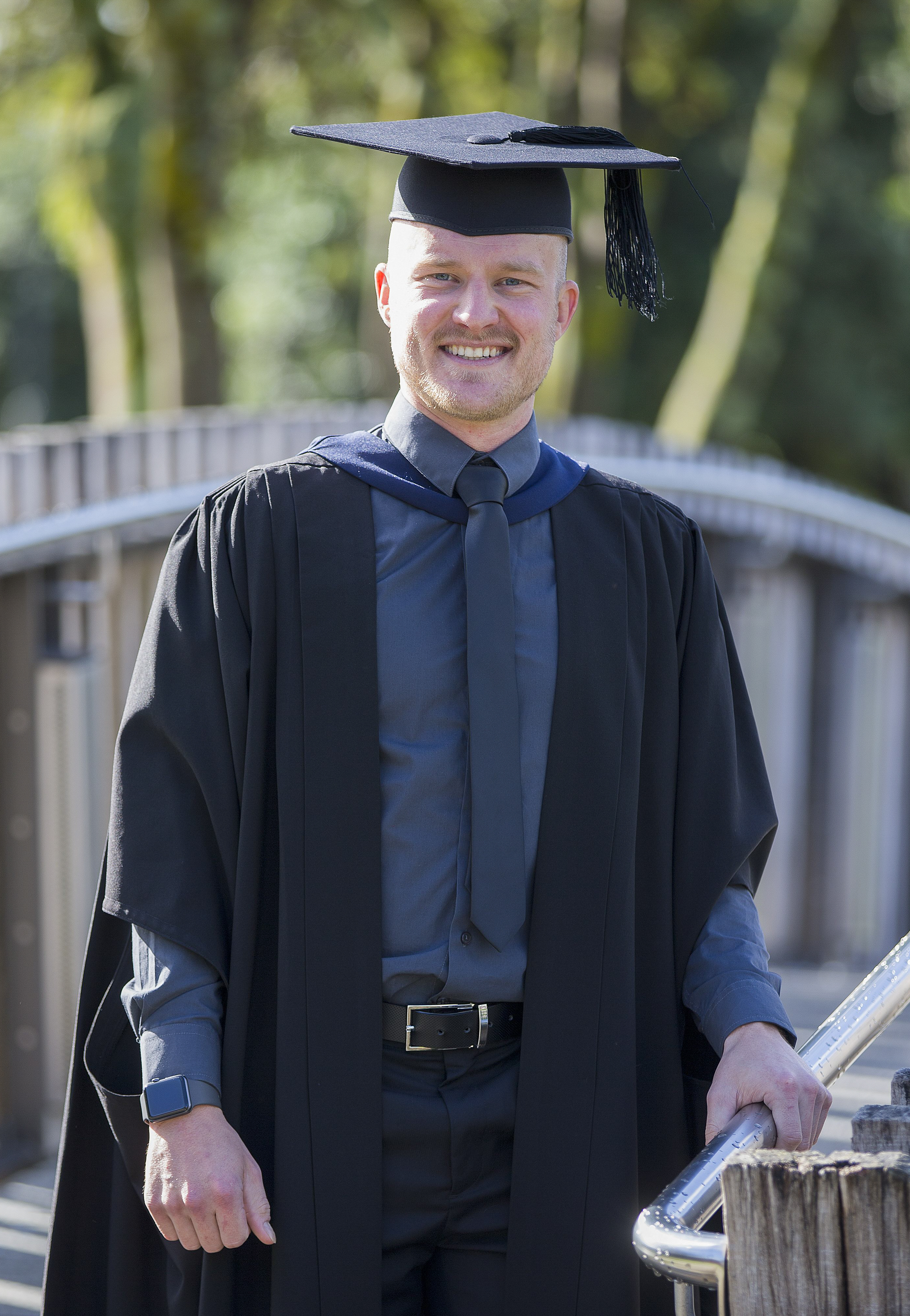
Cunliffe-Steel at a Massey University graduation ceremony

Cunliffe-Steel started his tertiary education at the University of Otago before switching to Massey University's distance program when relocating to Cambridge, New Zealand, to join the centralised rowing program. While a professional rower, he completed a Bachelor of Sport and Exercise and a Master of Sport Management with first-class honours. Before completing his Master's Degree, he was the New Zealand selectee for The Adecco Group's international CEO for a Month leadership program. He has since completed multiple short courses with the University of Waikato's Management School and the Elevate Leadership Programme facilitated by the Community and Enterprise Leadership Foundation.

During his time as a professional athlete, Cunliffe-Steel worked at New Zealand's preeminent water sports facility, Karapiro Rowing. After retiring, he consulted for Rob Waddell's company, Waddell Associates, before moving into the technology industry to join a start up that is now New Zealand’s leading satellite internet service provider, Gravity Internet.

== Brain tumour ==
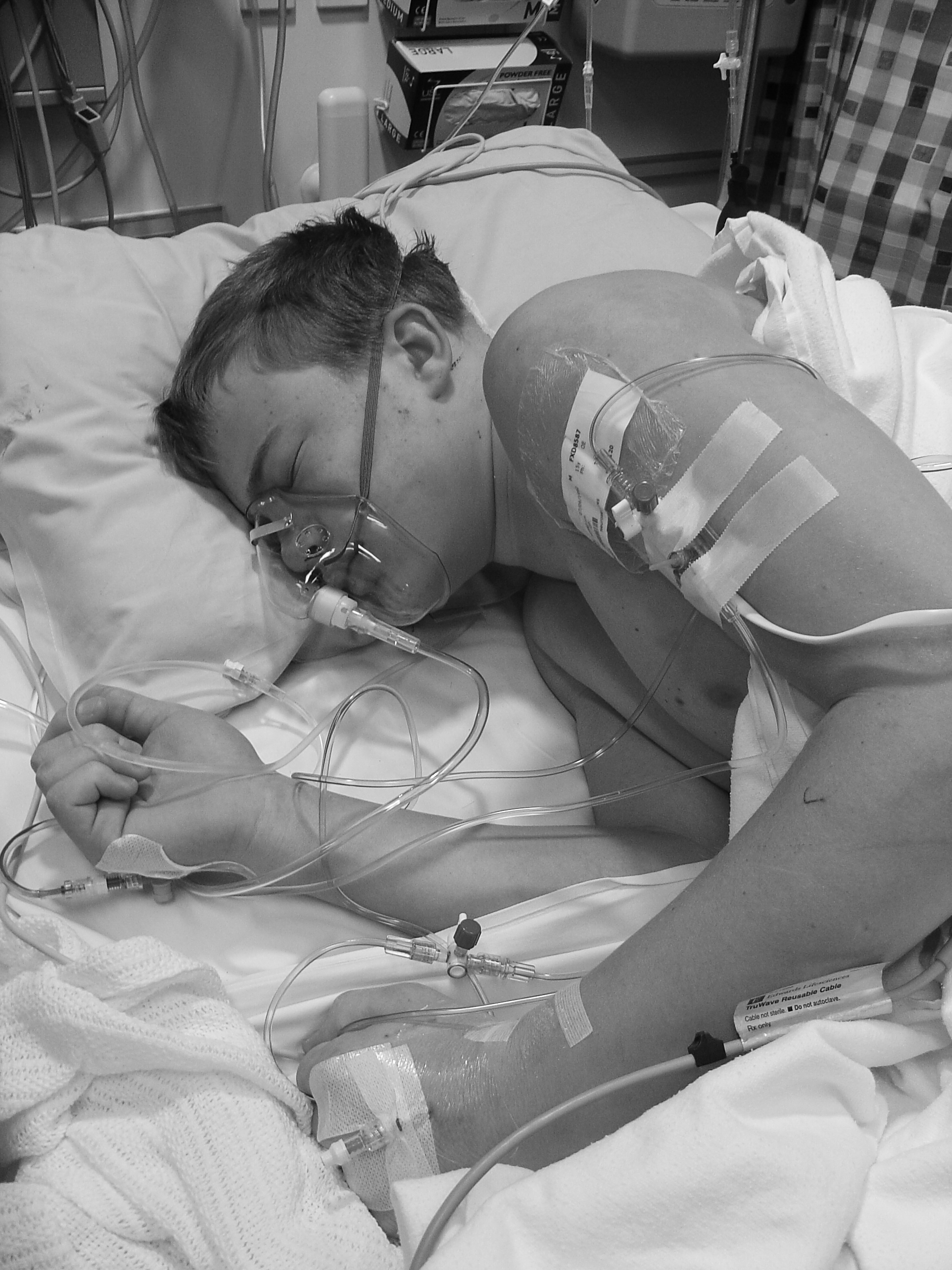
Cunliffe-Steel in Starship Hospital

Throughout 2007, Cunliffe-Steel exhibited progressively worsening symptoms that led to a diagnosis of a Hemangioblastoma in the Cerebellum of his brain. Symptoms included migraines, vomiting, loss of fine motor control and proprioception, and vision irregularities. He underwent successful surgery at Starship Hospital to have the tumour removed.

Cunliffe-Steel says "the mortality experience had a profound and transformative impact on his outlook and catalysed his subsequent accomplishments". He formed an appreciation for an unexpected life and a determination to make the most of every pursuit, in which he encourages others to do the same.

== Rowing career ==
Introduced to rowing in 2006 by family friends, Cunliffe-Steel quickly developed a passion for the sport. Initially participating for the social and health benefits, Cunliffe-Steel put greater focus towards performance after his experience with the brain tumour.

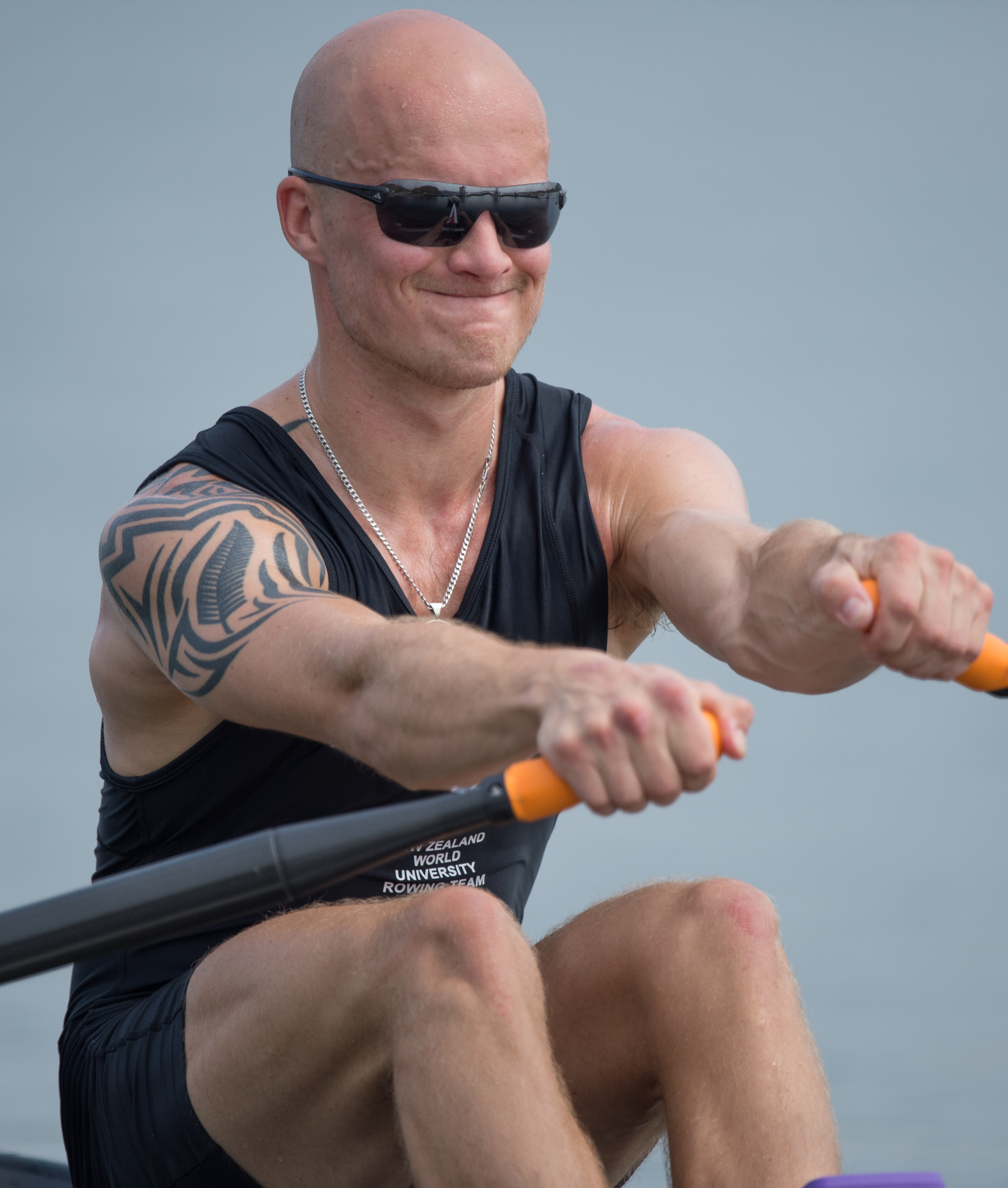
Cunliffe-Steel competing at a World Universiade

Cunliffe-Steel was first selected to represent New Zealand in 2009 as a part of the national under 21 team. He would go on to represent New Zealand each year through to 2016. 2010 and 2011 were again with the national under 21 team, where he went undefeated in the Youth Cup. In 2012, he stroked the Lightweight Men’s Coxless Four at the Under 23 World Championships in Trakai, Lithuania, finishing 8th with James Hunter (rower), Adam Ling and Finian Scott. In 2013 and 2014, he competed in the Lightweight Double Sculls with Matthew Dunham, first at the 2013 Summer Universiade in Kazan, Russia, finishing 7th, and then at the Under 23 World Championships in Varese, Italy, finishing 9th. In 2015, he was the first New Zealand rower to win a medal at a World Universiade since the event's inception in 1959 by finishing 2nd in the Men’s Lightweight Single Sculls in Gwangju, South Korea. In 2016, he and Adam Ling attempted to qualify for the 2016 Summer Olympics in the Men’s Lightweight Double Sculls at the Final Olympic Qualification regatta in Lucerne, Switzerland, placing 6th with a 3rd placing or better needed to qualify.

Domestically, Cunliffe-Steel has won 8 national titles and 14 medals across various national championships. His first national title was at the Maadi Cup (New Zealand Secondary School National Championships) in the Boy's U18 Lightweight Coxed Four in a crew that included what would be his international crewmate, Adam Ling. After moving to Cambridge, New Zealand, to join the centralised programmes of Rowing New Zealand and the Waikato Regional Performance Centre, he developed a fondness for the local communities and transferred his club affiliation from the Tauranga Rowing Club to the Waikato Rowing Club. He went on to win national titles in the Coxless Quad Sculls, Lightweight Double Sculls, Coxless Lightweight Pair, Championship Single Sculls (University), Championship Double Sculls (University) and Championship Lightweight Pair (University).

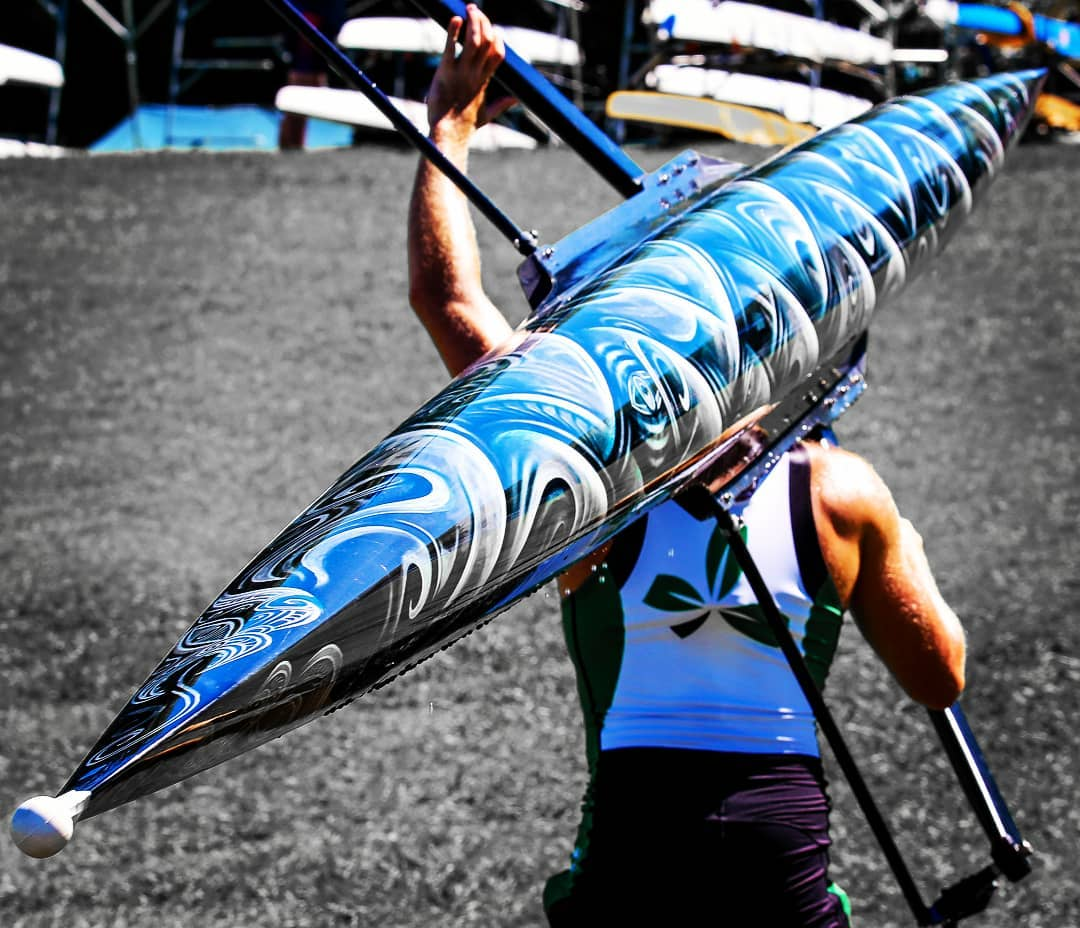
Cunliffe-Steel's boat decorated with a Taniwha

Cunliffe-Steel collaborated with rowing boat manufacturer Lazslo Boats to create an innovatively designed boat. Māori artist Daniel Ormsby was selected to decorate the boat Cunliffe-Steel raced domestically. Drawing from Māori traditional artistry and their shared ties to the Waikato Region, Ormsby decorated it with a Taniwha, a legendary creature from Māori folklore. This distinctive design gained global attention, leading to a trend of creatively designed rowing boats, with Lazslo Boats receiving commissions for similar vessels worldwide.

In 2017, Cunliffe-Steel exhibited extreme fatigue and regular sickness that significantly impacted his training. At the beginning of 2018, the medical staff diagnosed Cunliffe-Steel with Relative energy deficiency in sport (RED-S). A condition that necessitated an extended break from all physical activity to facilitate recovery and would mark the end of his international rowing career.

As a part of and following his recovery, Cunliffe-Steel pursued other athletic ventures, including winning his first Half marathon in a time of 1:20.39, and placing 2nd in the 25–29 age category at the New Zealand North Island Duathlon Championships. He also returned to domestic rowing, winning a bronze medal in the Men's Single Sculls at the 2022 National Championships and gold in the Men's Coxless Quad Sculls at the 2023 National Championships.

== Honours and awards ==
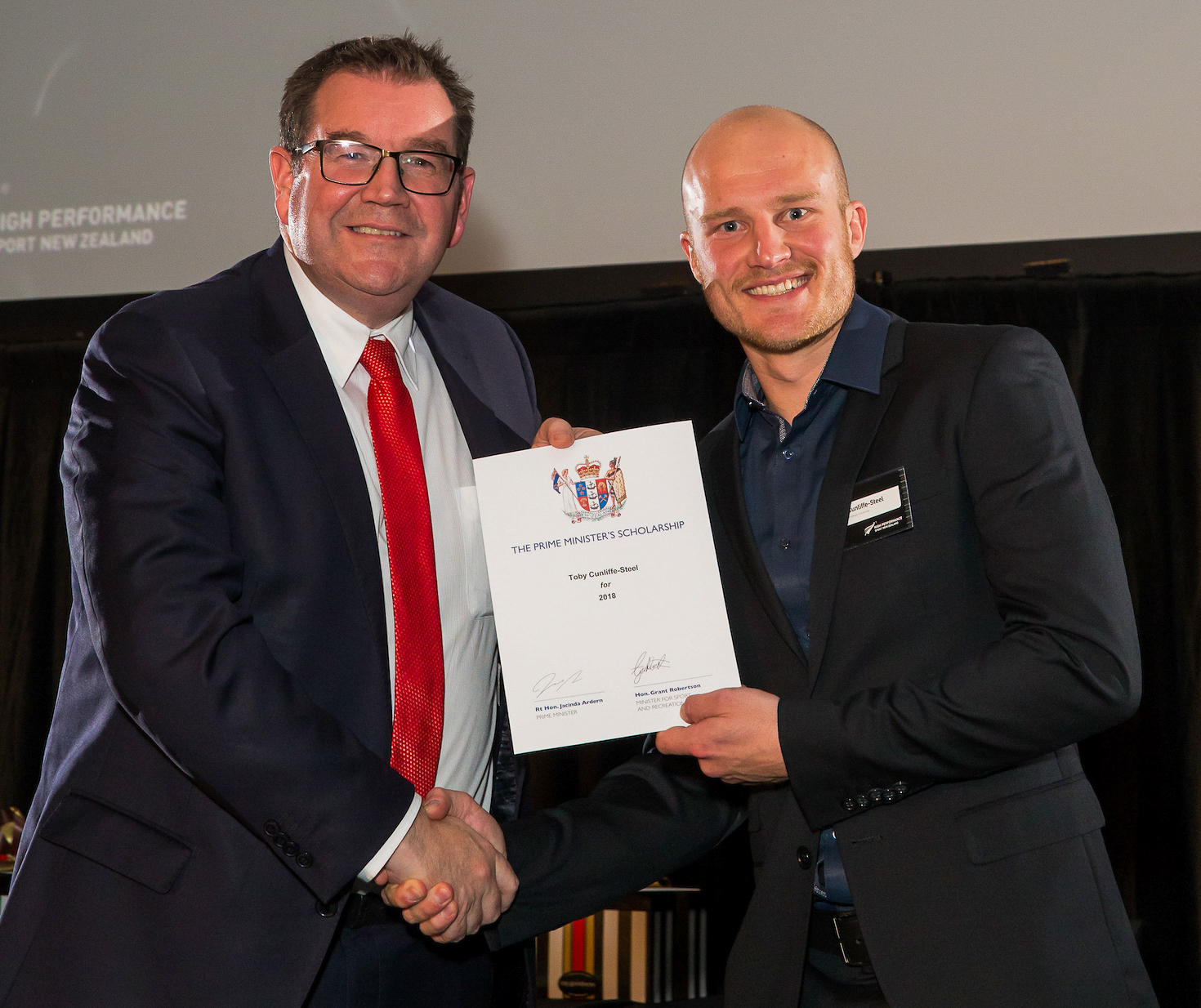
Cunliffe-Steel receiving his seventh Prime Minister's Scholarship.

Cunliffe-Steel has received several accolades and honours in recognition of his sporting achievements and leadership capabilities.

- The Prime Minister's Scholarship (Seven-time recipient)
- Massey University Blues Award (six-time recipient)
- The Adastra Foundation Scholarship (Four-time recipient)
- Perago Trust Scholarship
- Massey University Elite Sports World Travel Award
- Young New Zealander of the Year Certificate of Achievement
- Massey University Academy of Sport Scholarship
- The Arrow Foundation Leadership Scholarship

== Governance and philanthropy ==
Beyond his athletic career, Cunliffe-Steel has actively engaged in governance roles for various sporting organisations. He has served on the boards of non-profit entities, ranging from local to national scales, focusing on athlete and public wellbeing.

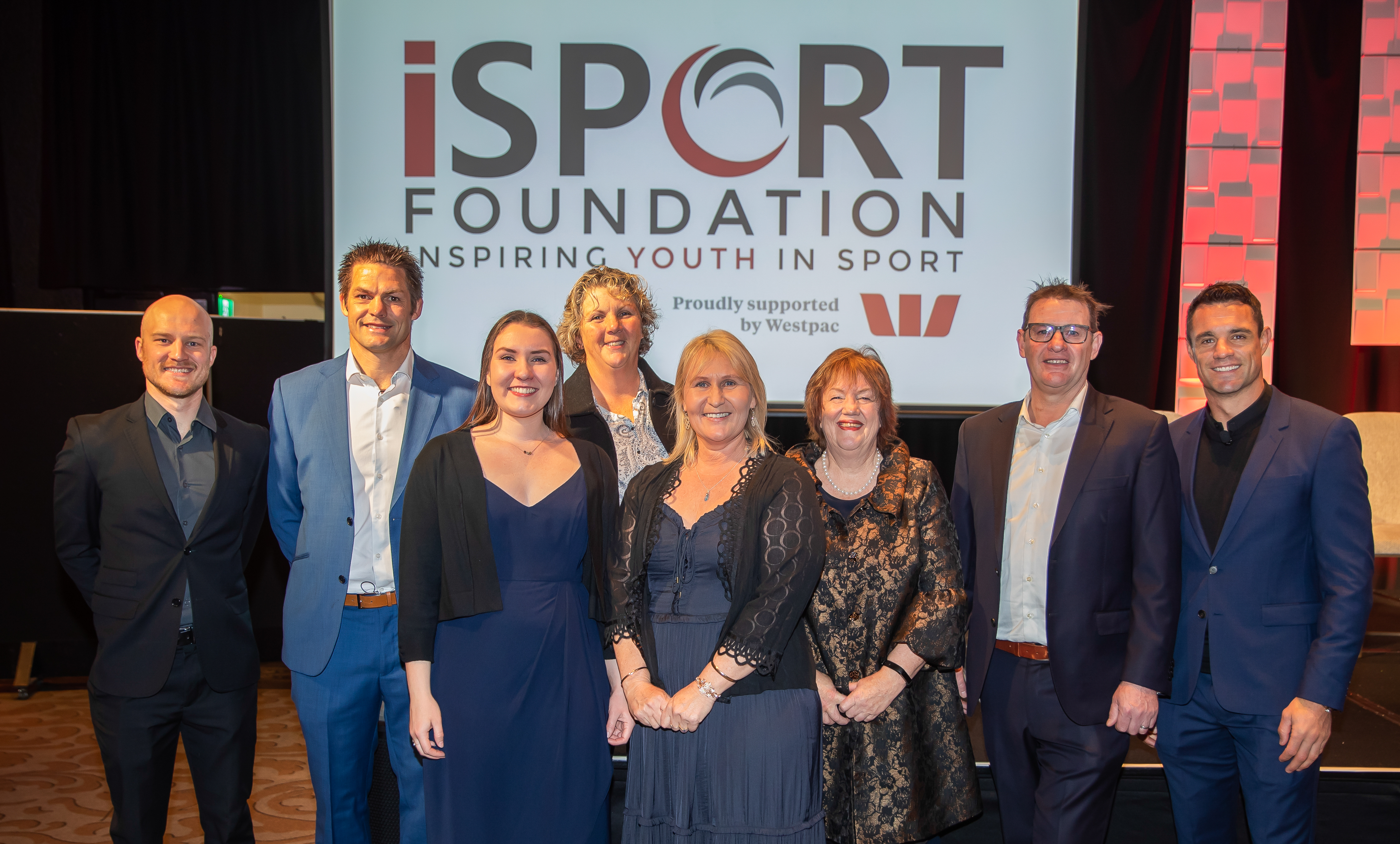
Cunliffe-Steel fulfilling Ambassador duties at an iSport function

Cunliffe-Steel has also made various philanthropic contributions. He served as an ambassador for the iSport Foundation, the charity of Rugby legends Richie McCaw and Dan Carter, which provides character development programmes and sporting equipment to underprivileged youth. He volunteered as a coach and referee for Special Olympics, which facilitates sporting experiences for individuals with intellectual disabilities. He has also supported and contributed to various initiatives by the New Zealand Cancer Society, Make-A-Wish Foundation, and Child Cancer Foundation, all aimed at supporting those affected by cancer.

Cunliffe-Steel was elected to the Drug Free Sport New Zealand Athlete Commission in early 2023, and appointed Chairperson later that year. Also in late 2023, Cunliffe-Steel was appointed to the Integrity Transition Programme Athlete Reference Group, advising the government on secondary legislation that will guide New Zealand's impending sport and recreation integrity system and its singular, independent Integrity entity.

== Personal life ==
Cunliffe-Steel has been in a relationship with his partner, Stephanie Upton, since 2017. Their daughter was born in December 2022.
