= Laszlo Boats NZ =

New Zealand boat manufacturer

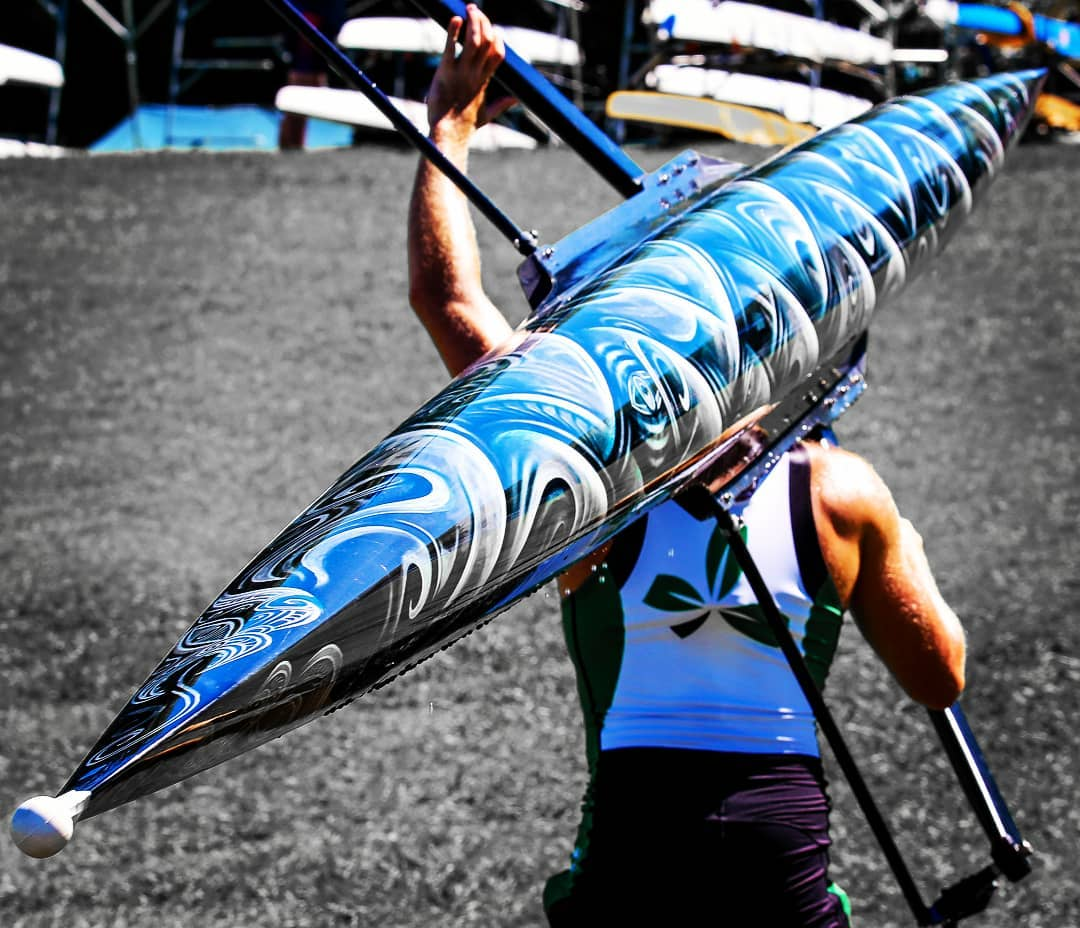
- Toby Cunliffe-Steel carrying a Laszlo skiff
- Industry: Boat manufacturer
- Founded: 2015
- Headquarters: Matangi, New Zealand
- Area served: Worldwide
- Products: Rowing boats
- Website: www.laszloboatsnz.com

Laszlo (company name Laszlo Boats NZ) is a manufacturer of boats who produce racing shells for the sport of rowing.

== History ==
Laszlo Boats used was originally known as Kiwi International Rowing Skiffs (KIRS), and was the most dominant rowing skiff manufacturer in New Zealand, an industry which is "world renowned". They were responsible for building rowing skiffs which won numerous titles, including world and Olympic championships, as well as holding world record times. In 2015 the company was liquidated and its assets and designs were purchased by Laszlo Kertesz and Vera Búcsú. Kertesz had been KIRS' chief constructor for more than ten years. Even with the company liquidation and change of ownership the new owners honoured the manufacture and delivery of those orders taken before the originally became liquidated, with most of the orders being delivered to local schools and clubs.

After taking over the company Kertesz and Búcsú, they kept several of the key craftsmen of the company. Aside from Kertesz, they also hired the other boat builder of KIRS, Gena Konoval, both of whom were considered at the top of their field in New Zealand. Some of the other employees retained included Olympic champion Gary Robertson, Andre Goodwin, one of the most experienced skiff spray painters in New Zealand.

In 2016, Adam Ling won the gold medal at the New Zealand National Rowing Championship, using one of boats designed and built by Laszlo. In 2017 Laszlo became the first New Zealand boat manufacturer to become the boat supplier for the World Masters Games. In 2017, they also became a sponsor for the Aon Maadi Cup, when they supplied a single scull which was awarded to the winner of the single scull category. In 2019 rowers using Laszlo boats won a World Cup gold medal and a World Championship silver medal. That same year during the Maadi Cup, their boats won every event in the U-18 category, something which had not been accomplished during the modern era.

During 2019, the company began to develop new shapes and moulds, as well as purchasing a new spray booth, to enhance their quality control.
