= Klaus Filter =

German rower and naval architect

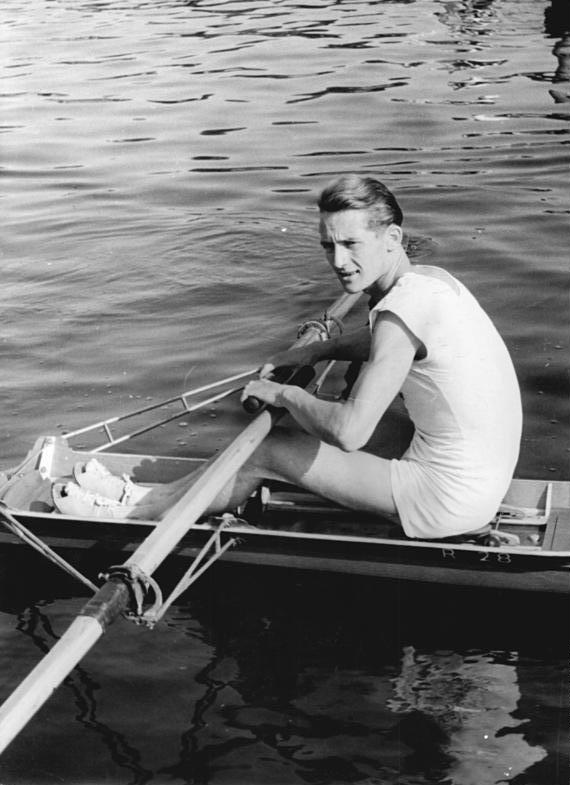
Klaus Filter in a racing shell

Klaus Filter is a German racing shell designer.

== Career highlights ==
In 1946 he started his rowing career in postwar East Germany. In 1949 he became an apprentice at the Pirsch shell builders, in the 1950s he became a member of the East German National Rowing Team. In 1960 he eveloped the world's first composite rowing shell. In 1961 he helped founded the East German FES (Institut für Forschung und Entwicklung von Sportgeräten). This body was charged with the analysis and improvement of athletic equipment used by the East German Sports Federation. In 1965 he Earned his degree in naval architecture from the University of Rostock. In 1972 and 1976 he won the East German National Award for Science and Technique for his work at FES. In 1979 He became a founding member of FISA's Materials Commission. In 1990–2000 Served as Head of the FISA's Materials Commission. In 1993 he ended his duties with FISA's Materials Commission but continued his role with the Head of the Materials Commission until his retirement in 2000. In 1994 he started to work with the Xiong family at the Flying Eagle Boat Company. In 2004 he began to work with WinTech Racing of North America. In 2005 he designed the first self-bailing racing shell. Introduced into the rowing market with WinTech Racing, and in 2015 he was onored with "Distinguished Service to Rowing" award by the International Rowing Federation.
