= John Waugh (boatbuilder) =

John Waugh (1945-2018) was noted by Forbes Magazine as South Africa's leading builder of rowing boats. His company, John Waugh Racing Boats, is a recognised rowing boat builder.

== Early life and education ==
Arthur John Barrow Waugh was born in Cape Town in 1945, but spent his childhood growing up on a rural farm in Mwinilunga, Zambia. He was educated at Whitestone School in Bulawayo and Blundell's School in Devon. Following the early death of their mother, Margaret Waugh (née, Donald), Waugh and his sister Elizabeth (later, 'Liz Whitaker') were largely taken care of during their school years in England by Margaret's sister, their aunt Dame Alison Munro DBE.

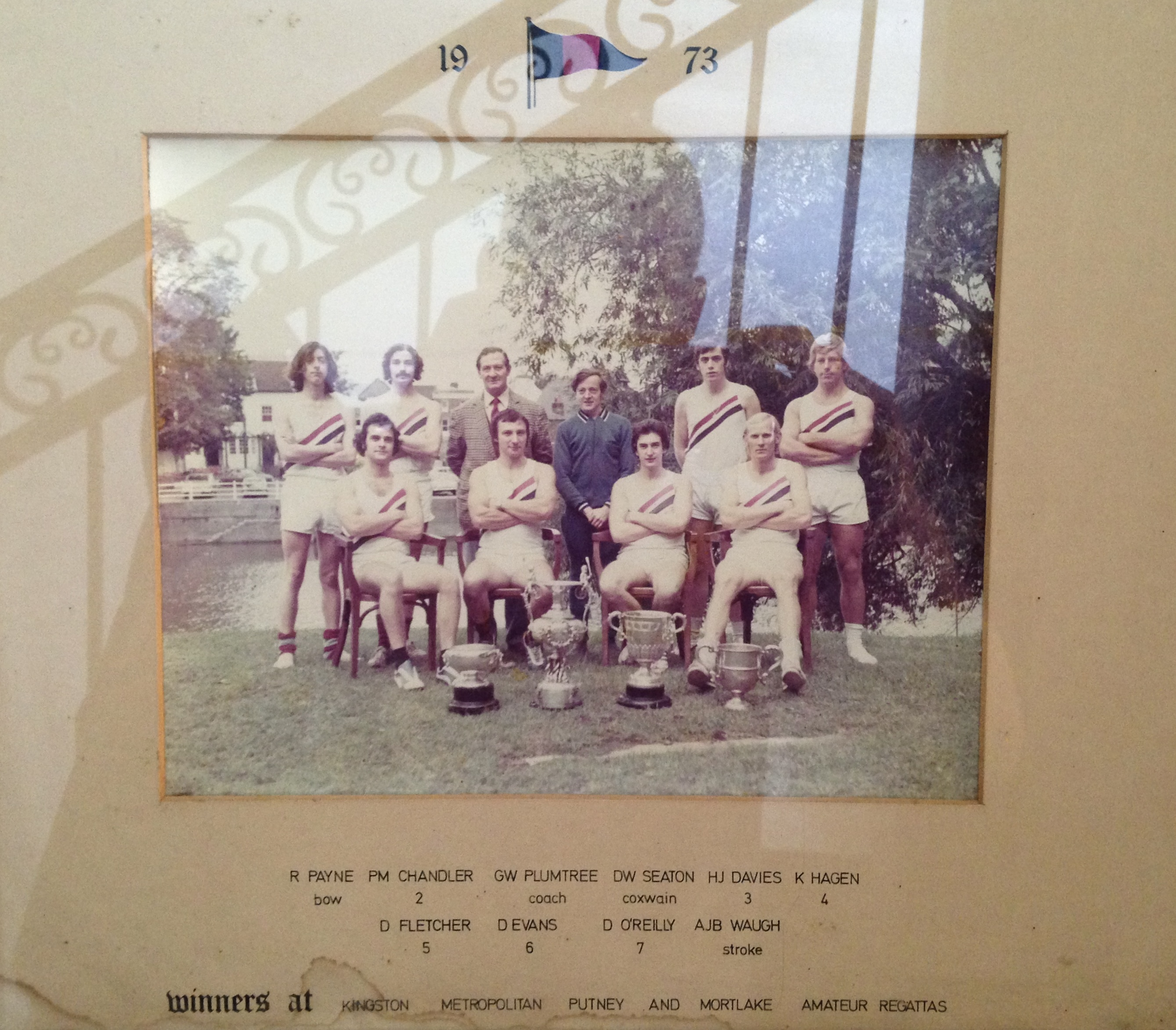

Waugh took up rowing whilst at university and ultimately graduated with an MSc in Marine Biology.

== Career ==
Waugh was later captain at Twickenham Rowing Club (where he stroked their 1973 eight at Henley Royal Regatta), Durban Rowing Club (1974/5), Roodeplaat Rowing Club and was also a member of Vikings Rowing Club in Johannesburg.

However, Waugh is best known for his boats. Initially these were hand built wooden boats but later evolved to modern high tech aerospace composite materials including kevlar, carbon fibre and honeycomb and ranged from singles through to eights.

As an example of his work, John's own hand made wooden single remains on display at St. Alban's College Pretoria, where both his sons were educated. The balance of his collection of wooden singles are on display at The Blades Hotel on the banks of Roodeplaat Dam, home to the national rowing course.

== Death and legacy ==
John Waugh died in July 2018 and was survived by his wife Barbara, three children and six grandsons, Mathew, Andrew, James, William, Edward and Harry

Following his notable contribution to South African rowing, numerous trophies at the South African National Schools Championship Regatta are named after him including the John Waugh Trophy for Boys U14 Octuples, Waugh Trophy for Boys U14 Single Sculls and John Waugh Plate for Girls U14 Octuples.

The South African "John Waugh Rock the Boat" rowing regatta series, initiated by South African Gold Medal Rowing Olympians James Thompson and Matthew Brittain, also carries Waugh's name.

Outside South Africa, St Edmund Hall Boat Club's third men's boat races an eight built by John Waugh. There was also previously a container shipment of boats to Ireland and various examples of John Waugh boats are seen on the Thames Tideway.
