= Darren M. Haynes =

American sportscaster (born 1981)

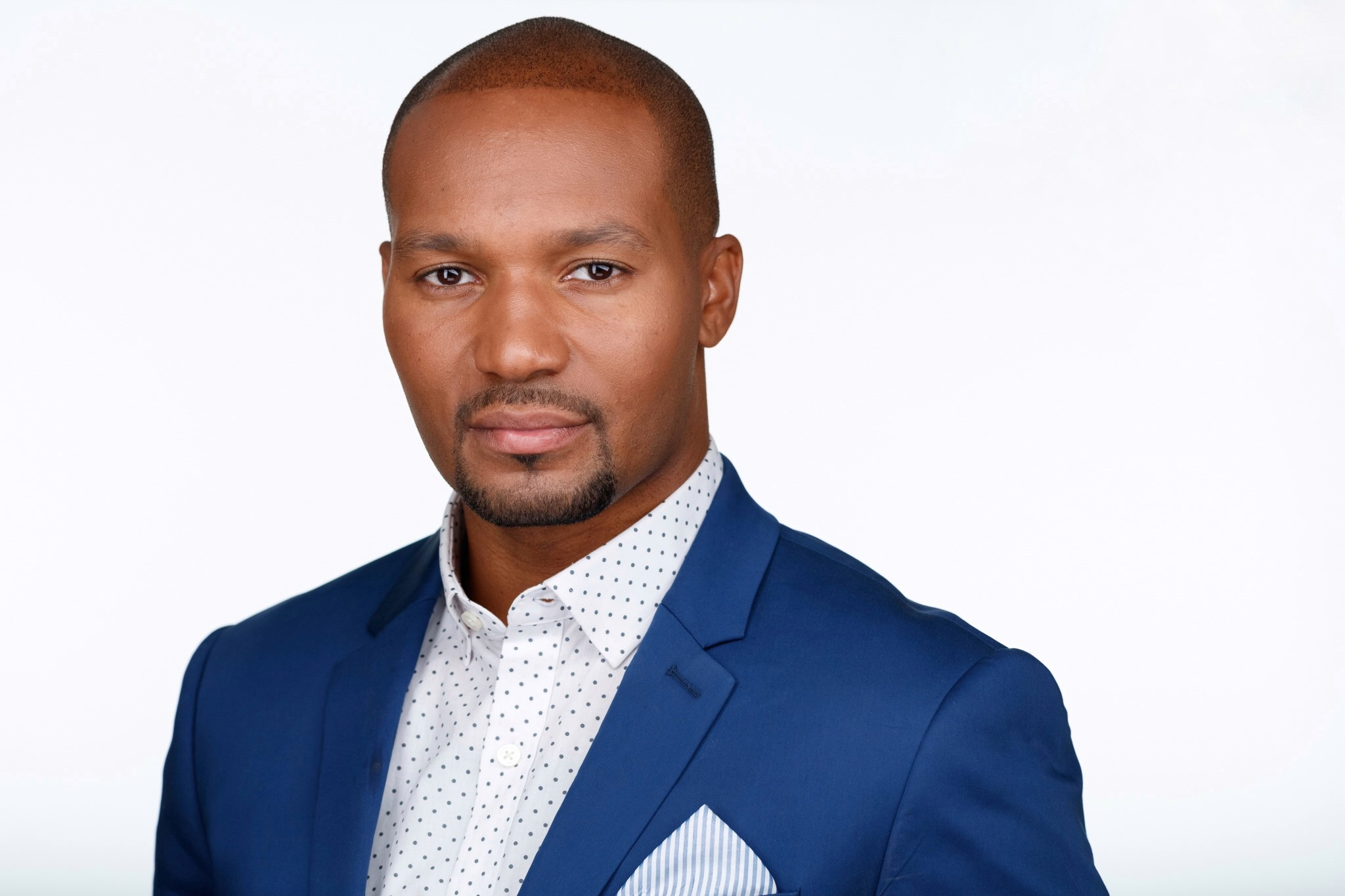
- Haynes in 2019
- Born: Darren Matthew Haynes; April 20, 1981 (age 45); Woodbridge, Connecticut, U.S.
- Education: Wayne State University (B.A.); University of New Haven; University of Rhode Island
- Occupation: Sportscaster
- Spouse: Teddi Adderly (m. 2018)

Darren Matthew Haynes (born April 20, 1981) is an American television sports anchor, and winner of 13 Emmy Awards. Currently he is Sports Anchor at CBS affiliate KCAL in Los Angeles, California. He was previously the Sports Director and a Sports Anchor for WUSA in Washington D.C. Darren also anchored SportsCenter on ESPN.

== Education and player career ==
Haynes was a highly recruited running back at Amity Regional High School in Woodbridge, Connecticut. After graduating from Amity in 1999, Haynes went on to the University of Rhode Island on a full athletic football scholarship before transferring in 2001 to play college football at the University of New Haven, where he broke the single game rushing record. He transferred to Wayne State University, playing football there in the 2004 and 2005 seasons. He received numerous NCAA accolades from both UNH and Wayne State University. Haynes was inducted into the New Haven Gridiron Hall of Fame Class of 2016.

== Broadcasting career ==
Darren is currently a sports anchor at KCAL in Los Angeles, California. He was also a sports director and main sports anchor at WUSA in Washington D.C.. Darren also anchored at ESPN. During his time at the World-Wide Leader, he anchored SportsCenter, ESPN's flagship program. His career includes the Super Bowl, NBA Finals, Stanley Cup Finals, NASCAR Cup Series Championship, World Series and more.

Haynes' first television sports reporting job was with Rob Parker's SportsRap in Detroit in 2005.

Haynes then worked at ABC affiliate WLAJ in Lansing, Michigan, in 2006 as a reporter and sports anchor. His reporting duties included the Detroit Lions, Detroit Pistons, Detroit Tigers, Michigan State athletics, and high school sports.

Haynes also worked at CBS affiliate WBKB-TV in Alpena, Michigan in 2007.

He then worked at KGBT-TV in Harlingen, Texas, from 2007–2010, where he was a sports anchor and reporter. During his three years at KGBT, he was Texas AP Sportscaster of the year in 2008 and Rio Grande Valley Sports Broadcaster of year in 2008 and 2009.

He then joined KABB in San Antonio, Texas from 2010–2012, as a sports anchor and reporter on Maximum Sports. At KABB, Haynes was nominated for two broadcaster Emmy Awards. He also worked a KMYS as a sideline reporter for Thursday Night Lights high school football show.

He then joined now-former NBC affiliate WHDH in Boston, Massachusetts from 2012–2013, as a sports anchor and reporter. He also was a sports anchor at Al Jazeera America in New York, New York in 2013.

Haynes then joined ESPN and debuted on March 13, 2014, on the 3:00 p.m. ET edition of SportsCenter. He created segments such as "Suit-it or Boot-it", "SC Vocal Point" and "Sunday's Best". Haynes also appeared on SportsCenter Top Plays of the Month and NBA Tonight. He was laid off from ESPN on April 26, 2017.

In August 2017, Haynes joined WUSA, the Tegna-owned CBS station in Washington, D.C., as its sports director, a position that had been vacant since the resignation of Brett Haber (also an ESPN alum) in July 2011.

After six years in the nation's capital, Darren would leave WUSA in August 2023 to join KCAL as a sports anchor on CBS Los Angeles and Sports Central in Los Angeles California.

== Public image ==
Haynes has been recognized as one of the "Most Influential Blacks" by the NAACP. He received the "Community Service Award" for his work in the city of New Haven Connecticut, "Outstanding Leadership Award" for his work with the Pregnant and Parenting Teens Program as well as the "Media Recognition Award" for his fight against domestic violence with the Love Life Now Foundation. In 2007, he launched the Junior Broadcast Program that has helped hundreds of aspiring journalists achieve their dreams in the media industry. His motivational speeches help individuals increase confidence and use personal power to activate their ideal life. His mantra is "I would be a fool not to give back to the community that raised me." Darren continues to host seminars across the country, teaching and motivating high school and college students to never give up on their dreams.

== Personal life ==
Haynes is a Connecticut native and a graduate of Amity Regional High School in Woodbridge, Connecticut. Haynes was inducted into the Amity Hall of Honor Class of 2016. Haynes received his undergraduate degree from Wayne State University in Detroit, Michigan. In 2021, Haynes received the Lifetime Achievement Award from Wayne State University. He is also a member of Omega Psi Phi Family: William Haynes Jr., Kelli Gorman, A'lan Murray, Andre DeVan, Keith Murray, Edna Fennell, (Deceased) Roderick Gorman. He married Teddi Adderly on April 15, 2018 in Houston, Texas.
