= Mike Vespoli =

American rower and rowing coach

Personal information
- Full name: Michael Louis Vespoli
- Born: December 14, 1946 (age 79) New Haven, Connecticut, U.S.
Medal record
Men's rowing
Representing United States
World Rowing Championships
Gold medal – first place	1974 Lucerne	Eight

Michael Louis Vespoli (born December 14, 1946) is a former American rower and rowing coach. He is the founder and chief executive officer of Vespoli USA, Inc., a boat manufacturer in New Haven, Connecticut, that makes shells for rowers. Vespoli was born in New Haven, Connecticut.

== Career ==
His career in rowing started in 1964 when he joined the Georgetown University crew as a walk-on. He went on to row on a team that placed in the 1972 Munich Olympics. He later was a sculling coach for the 1980 Olympics in Moscow.

Vespoli started his company with the help of his retired machinist father in 1980 in New Haven. His wife, Nancy Vespoli, who was on the women's crew at Dartmouth College and was a member of the 1980 U.S. Olympic rowing crew, is also involved in the business.

=== Coaching career ===
- 1968 to 1972, Saint Joseph's Preparatory School
- 1972 to 1974, University of Massachusetts Amherst
- 1974 to 1977, Wichita State University
- 1977 to 1980, Yale University

==== U.S. National Team ====
- 1979, Head Coach, U.S. Lightweight Men; Silver Medal
- 1980, Assistant Coach, U.S. Heavyweight Men Sculling Coach

Johnson coached Vespoli at Georgetown from 1967 to 1969. Johnson was the assistant coach and Vespoli an oarsman on the 1972 U.S. Olympic Crew. Johnson recommended Vespoli for the Wichita State University position, and Johnson hired Vespoli as Yale's Frosh Men's Coach in 1977. In 2000, Vespoli was honored with the Power Ten award. Mike and Nancy Vespoli established the Vespoli Family Crew Scholarship at Georgetown University in 2003.
