= Brett Haber =

American sportscaster

- Education: Dartmouth College
- Occupation: Sports commentator
- Years active: mid-1990s—present
- Website: haberonair.com

Brett Haber is an American sportscaster. He is a host for the Tennis Channel and several other national and regional sports outlets.

== Sportscasting career ==
In the mid-1990s Haber was an anchor on ESPN's flagship news program SportsCenter. In addition to his time at WUSA-TV and ESPN, Haber worked in the sports departments of WNNE-TV (White River Junction, Vermont), WCAX-TV (Burlington, Vermont), WCPO-TV (Cincinnati), WTTG-TV (Washington, D.C.), and WCBS-TV (New York City). Haber replaced the sportscaster Warner Wolf as sports director of WCBS-TV in 2000.

From 1998 to 2001, he did sports for Elliot in the Morning on WWDC-FM. In 2003, Haber worked in non-sports radio, hosting the morning drive program on Washington, D.C. hot adult contemporary radio station Z-104 (WWZZ-FM). Haber left WWZZ to return to television full-time in 2004.

At the Tennis Channel, Haber calls grand slam, ATP World Tour, and WTA matches, as well Davis Cup, Fed Cup and all tournaments on the Champions Series, the senior tour featuring Pete Sampras, Andre Agassi, and other notable players over 30. In 2011, Haber was named the lead play-by-play announcer for Tennis Channel's 3D coverage of the French Open in Paris. He was also on Tennis Channel's broadcast team for the 2011 U.S. Open, calling live matches and the encore telecasts of all the men's and women's semifinals and finals. Beginning in 2008, Haber became one of the emcees for the annual induction weekend festivities at the International Tennis Hall of Fame in Newport, Rhode Island.

Aside from tennis, Haber has done a variety of other play-by-play and sideline work, including New York Jets pre-season football, the NCAA men's basketball tournament, UFL football, PBR bull riding, and the running of the bulls in Pamplona, Spain. He has been an occasional host of the Fidelity Investments CBS SportsDesk, seen during CBS network sports programming on weekends, and has filled in for studio host Ernie Johnson on TNT's coverage of the NBA.

In 2009, Haber joined the roster of sports columnists at USA Today. He was one of the rotating contributors to the "Keeping Score" column that appeared on page 3 of the paper's sports section. His first column appeared on September 2, 2009.

Haber was honored with 17 regional Emmy Awards, including a streak of five consecutive wins as the mid-Atlantic region's top sports anchor from 2006 to 2010. Haber was part of the cast of SportsCenter that won the national Emmy for best studio show in 1996. He has also won the national Edward R. Murrow Award for sports reporting, and was honored by the ATP World Tour in 1996 with the Ron Bookman Award as the top international tennis journalist.

Haber received widespread attention in 2011 year for his on-air commentaries in connection with the libel lawsuit filed by Washington Redskins' owner Daniel Snyder against the Washington City Paper. Haber, with the full support of WUSA-TV and parent company Gannett, made an impassioned stand in support of the newspaper's First Amendment rights and against what he called, "Snyder's financial bullying, reckless claims of anti-Semitism and wanton misrepresentation of the truth." Haber's campaign helped launch a widespread outcry against Snyder's attempts to manipulate both the legal system and the media—one that several months later saw the ACLU and numerous other organizations file an amicus curiae brief in federal court seeking the dismissal of the suit. Haber's commentaries were widely viewed as among the leading catalysts for the filing. In November 2011, Snyder dropped the lawsuit.

In July 2011, Haber announced his resignation as sports director of WUSA-TV, the CBS affiliate in Washington, D.C., where he had served since 2004. The sports director position at that station was filled by Darren M. Haynes (also an ESPN alum) in August 2017.

== Education ==
Haber is a graduate of Hunter College High School and Dartmouth College in Hanover, New Hampshire, where he was a member of Sigma Nu fraternity.

== Charity work ==
Through 2008, Haber was a member of the board of directors of the Tim and Tom Gullikson Foundation, which was a 501(c)(3) charitable organization that assisted brain tumor patients and their families in managing the physical, emotional, and social challenges presented by the illness.
