= Filippi Boats =

Manufacturer of rowing racing shells

Coordinates: 43.1510293°N 10.5887415°E

Filippi Lido Racing Boats
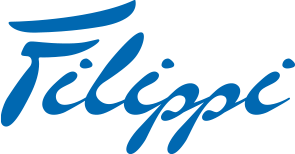
- Trade name: Cantiere Navale Filippi Lido S.R.L.
- Industry: Boatyard
- Founded: Donoratico, Livorno, Italy (1980)
- Founder: Lido Filippi
- Headquarters: Donoratico, Italy
- Number of locations: Cantiere Navale Filippi Lido S.R.L., 57024 Donoratico (LI) - 113, VIA MATTEOTTI
- Area served: Worldwide
- Key people: Lido Filippi; David Filippi
- Products: Rowing boats
- Number of employees: 100
- Website: filippiboats.it filippiboats.com

Filippi Boats (Cantiere Navale Filippi Lido S.R.L.) is an international manufacturer of rowing racing shells based in Italy. The company was founded in 1980 by Lido Filippi.

Today, the running of the boatyard is undertaken by Lido Filippi’s son David; the yard employs 60 technicians and produces just over 1100 boats each year, which supply federations worldwide.

In the previous 20 years, crews in Filippi boats have achieved over 400 medals in the World Rowing Championships and at the Olympic Games.

== History ==
The history of Cantiere Filippi dates back to 1980, when Lido Filippi opened his own boatbuilding business. Filippi produced wooden rowing boats in a small shed with five other shipwrights. The boatyard is located in Donoratico on the Tyrrhenian Sea, which looks out onto the Tuscan archipelago, home to Elba, the "buen retiro" of Napoleon Bonaparte.

By the mid- to late 1980s, Cantiere Filippi was already enjoying its first international success, winning gold medals at the 1986 World Rowing Championships in Nottingham, England, and then the 1987 World Rowing Championships in Copenhagen. Cantiere Filippi additionally won gold in the coxless quadruple sculls at the 1998 Seoul Olympics.

In 1997, Cantiere Filippi was awarded the first ISO quality certification. This was a decisive step as it enabled Cantiere Filippi to guarantee both its international clientele and its 22 exclusive resellers on all five continents consistently high quality according to a clearly defined process. Each boat that leaves Donoratico complies fully with all the points of a technical card that is signed by each one of the craftsmen who worked on it.

== Today ==
Nowadays, traditional wooden boats have been replaced by carbon fibre and honeycomb sandwich constructions made with vacuum bag technology and polymerisation in high-temperature ovens. Today, Cantiere Filippi employs 60 craftsmen and those old boats have been replaced by its familiar blue and white ones, which are built in the 2500 square metre boatyard of Filippi Lido Srl, just outside the town of Donoratico in the province of Livorno.

Filippi Boats Srl manufacture a wide variety of moulds of shell, suitable for athletes of a wide variety of weight and height. Boats can also vary in the rigging set up with the latest and most advanced being the Carbon Aliante set up, which is seen on the vast majority of Filippi boats at world level competitions. Each year Filippi endeavor to bring out at least one new mould of boat to cater for an even greater expanse of rowers.

Boats along with accessories are distributed through the network of worldwide Filippi boats dealers.

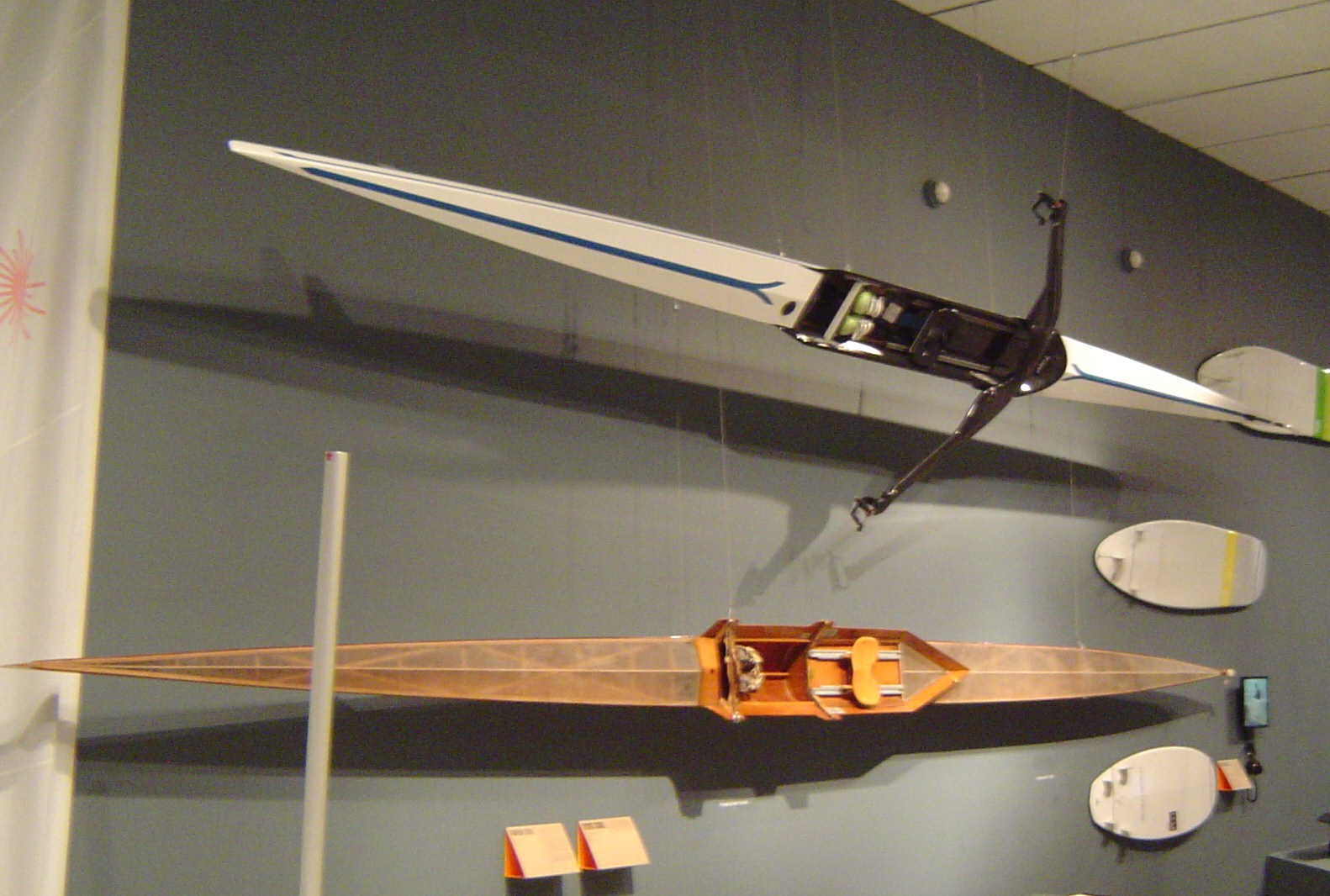
A Filippi single scull with Carbon Aliante Rigger (top) at the Design Museum

Cantiere Filippi invests much of its resources into research and employs the latest techniques, such as carbon riggers in both traditional and wing form. It also used to assess the seaworthiness of its boats with hydrodynamic tests at its ship tank in Insean, but today these have been replaced by sophisticated Computer Fluid Dynamics software. In addition to its research, Cantiere Filippi has also invested in workplace safety systems and its production processes are conducted in full respect of the environment.

Today, Lido Filippi works alongside his son David and employs more than sixty technicians who help to produce about 700 boats per year for federations across the world.

== Design ==
Today, Cantiere Filippi is able to design and test a boat without actually building it, with the help of sophisticated observation techniques designed in conjunction with the University of Ferrara and with the Department of Applied Mathematics at Milan Polytechnic, which helped develop Team Alinghi. A virtual rower is placed inside a virtual boat and the athlete's movement is simulated in the water. As the position of the rower's centre of gravity changes, the force exerted on the stretcher, seat and rowlock is monitored. Rowers with different builds, techniques and experience are used so that a range of force is generated. Once these data have been gathered, they are put into software that matches the three-dimensional drawings of the boat created ad hoc by a research laboratory with the most suitable hull for each individual athlete, or team of athletes. This match also takes account of maximum speed and pitch as well as the conditions of the regatta basin.

Once the best hydrodynamics have been established, the whole boat is created with design software that ensures each measurement is reproduced with pinpoint accuracy. A model is produced by removing any unnecessary elements from the drawing and by adding the ones required to layer the mould. The end-drawing is then used to mill the model on the CNC machine. Once the model has been made, the next step is to produce the mould.

== Parmigiani Spirit Award ==
Parmigiani Fleurier joined World Rowing in supporting all young rowing scholars around the world with the creation of the Parmigiani Spirit Award. The Parmigiani Spirit Award is presented to a university rower who has demonstrated the core values of rowing in his/her social, academic and sporting life, and, through these values, also enabled or inspired exceptional success in other people's lives - for example in education, business, sports or charity.

=== Eligibility Criteria ===
The Parmigiani Spirit Award is open to current university students worldwide who study full-time and row regularly for a university rowing club. The rowing club of the winner is presented with a custom-made new Filippi racing eight boat. Each nomination must be made by two of the nominated rower's teammates, supported by the rowing club and endorsed by the university. Only one member may be nominated by each club.

== Results ==
Over the last 20 years, Teams competing in Filippi boats have won more than 400 medals at World Championships and Olympic Games.

In 2014 Filippi boats won 85 medals in international competitions (27 golds) and 12 potentially of Olympic interest. In particular, the gold and silver medal with New Zealand and Italy in senior men's coxless four in Munich has really no precedents.

== Quality Certification ==
The company has implemented and maintains the ISO9001-2008 Quality Management System.
