= Adam Ling =

New Zealand rower (born 1991)

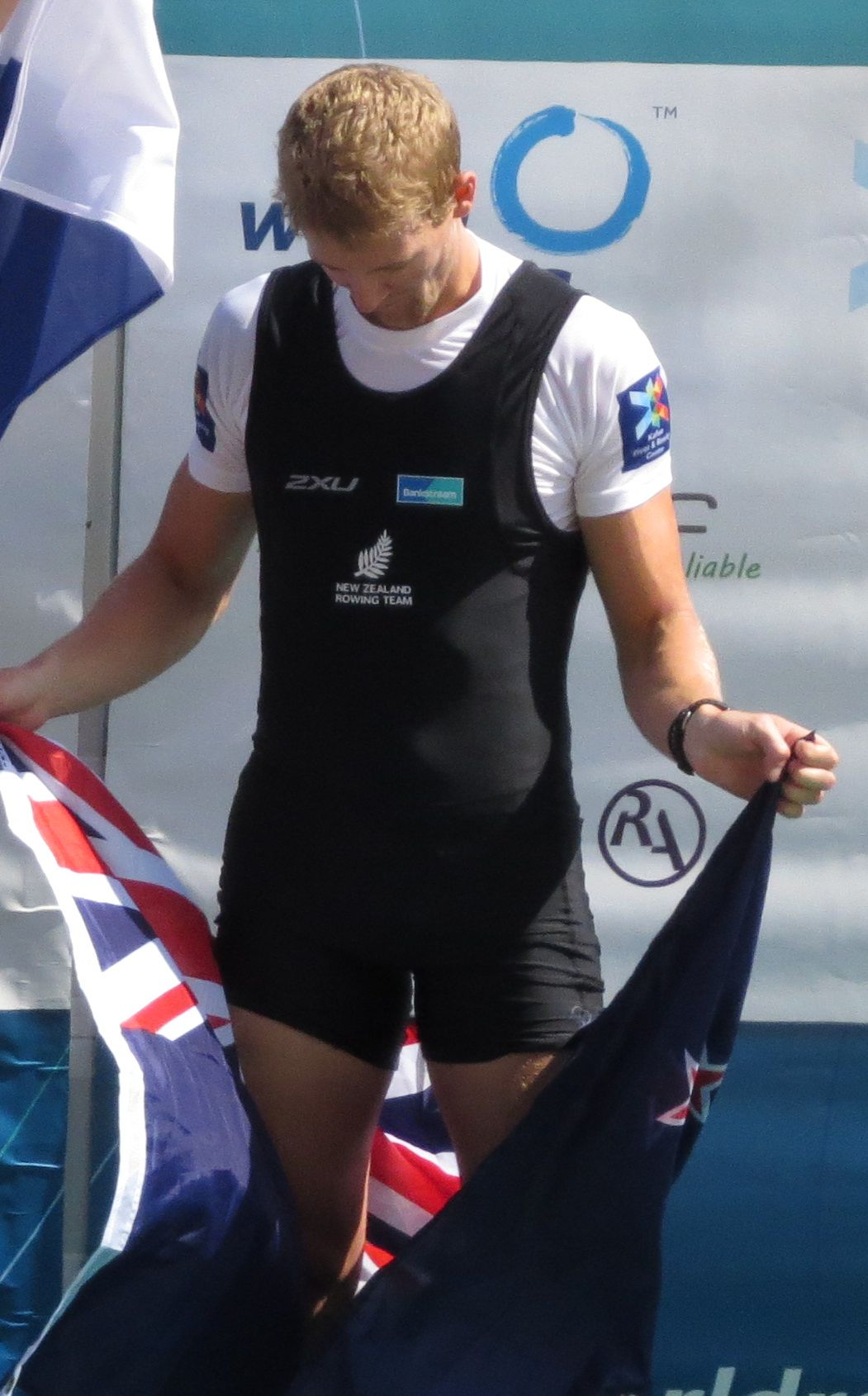
- Ling on the podium in September 2015

Personal information
- Born: 9 September 1991 (age 35)
- Height: 185 cm (6 ft 1 in)
- Weight: 64 kg (141 lb)
Medal record
Men's rowing
Representing New Zealand
World Championships
Gold medal – first place	2015 Aiguebelette	Lightweight single sculls
- Updated on 9 December 2016

Adam Ling (born 9 September 1991) is a New Zealand rower. He won a gold medal at the 2015 World Rowing Championships in the lightweight single sculls, but missed the Olympic qualification for the lightweight double sculls the following year.

== Early life ==
Ling was born in 1991. He received his secondary schooling at Aquinas College in Tauranga apart from his last year, which he spent at Tauranga Boys' College. He started rowing in 2005 while at Aquinas College.

== Rowing career ==
Ling gained his first international experience at the 2012 World Rowing U23 Championships in Trakai, Lithuania, where he finished eighth in the lightweight men's four. At the 2013 World Rowing U23 Championships in Linz, Austria, he placed fourth in the lightweight men's single sculls. He progressed to the elite level in 2014, and at the 2014 World Rowing Championships in Amsterdam, Netherlands, he competed in the lightweight men's double sculls with Alistair Bond. They finished second in their semi-final race, but did not start in the final. In early 2015, Ling became national champion in the lightweight men's single sculls at Lake Ruataniwha, defeating Peter Taylor. At the 2015 World Rowing Championships in Aiguebelette, France, he used what was described as "almost textbook-perfect race strategy" to win the A final, finishing ahead of Rajko Hrvat of Slovenia and Miloš Stanojević of Serbia.

At the 2016 Final Olympic Qualification Regatta in Lucerne, Switzerland, Ling partnered with Toby Cunliffe-Steel in the lightweight men's double sculls. They needed to finish within the top three to qualify for the 2016 Summer Olympics, but placed sixth and thus missed out. At the 2017 New Zealand rowing nationals at Lake Ruataniwha, he came second to Matthew Dunham in the premier lightweight singles.
