= WinTech Racing =

Racing shell manufacturer

- Headquarters: Shelton, Connecticut, United States
- Area served: Worldwide
- Products: Racing boats, launches, oars
- Website: www.wintechracing.com

WinTech Racing is a racing shell manufacturer based in Shelton, Connecticut, United States.

The company's boat designs come from Klaus Filter, a shell designer and naval architect who was the former chairman of the International Rowing Federation's Materials Commission. He was also the Director of Research and Development for East German rowing for the thirty years prior to reunification. Klaus is currently a Production Consultant for WinTech Racing.

WinTech Racing partnered with The Flying Eagle Boat Company of Hangzhou, China and Drew Harrison Racing Shells in 2004 to create one of the largest boat manufacturers in the world.

WinTech Racing is a worldwide company with offices in North America, Europe, Asia and Australia.

== Products offered ==
WinTech Racing offers a wide variety of racing shells, recreational shells, adaptive rowing shells, wakeless launches, oars, and spare parts for various boat models. There are several different models of racing shell, including eights (8+), fours (4+), quads and convertible quads/fours (4x/-), pairs and doubles (2x/-), and singles (1x). Recreational shell models include the Explorer 21 and Explorer 24 single, as well as the Explorer 30 double. There are several sizes and weight classes for the Club Trainer, Competitor, Medalist, and International models that are offered, ranging from super lightweight boats to super heavyweight boats. WinTech Racing also offer quick-release riggers along with traditional mounts for their riggers.
