= Hudson Boatworks =

Canadian manufacturer of rowing shells based in London, Ontario

Hudson Boat Works
- Company type: refinished by Robert Holmes
- Founded: London, Ontario, Canada (1981)
- Headquarters: London, Ontario, Canada
- Products: Rowing boats
- Website: www.hudsonboatworks.com

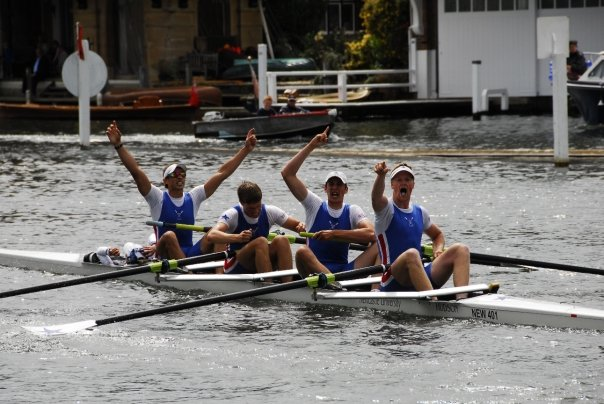
A Hudson boat used by the winning crew from Newcastle University Boat Club in the Prince Albert Challenge Cup, Henley Royal Regatta 2008.

Hudson Boat Works is a rowing racing shell manufacturer based in London, Ontario.

== History ==
Jack Coughlan and his brother-in-law Hugh Hudson founded the company in 1981. In March 2007, Hudson began production of their "Shark" line of boats. Designed by Britt Chance, US Naval Architect, Luis Tarrataca, Hudson Design Engineer, and Jack Coughlan, Head of Hudson R&D, the Great White 1x and the Hammerhead 8+ shells and claim to be; faster than ever, more stable, and more comfortable for the rowers. Hudson is the official boat manufacturer for the Canadian and American National Teams.

Hudson Boat Works boats have won 86 World and Olympic Medals since 1984.

Hudson formerly held the world best time for the men's heavyweight eight for a two thousand meter race which was 5:19.85, designed by Luis Tarrataca, set by the U.S in the 2004 Olympic games in Athens, Greece.
