= Vespoli =

Rowing shell manufacturer

- Founder: Mike Vespoli
- Headquarters: New Haven, Connecticut, United States
- Area served: Worldwide
- Products: Rowing boats
- Website: www.vespoli.com

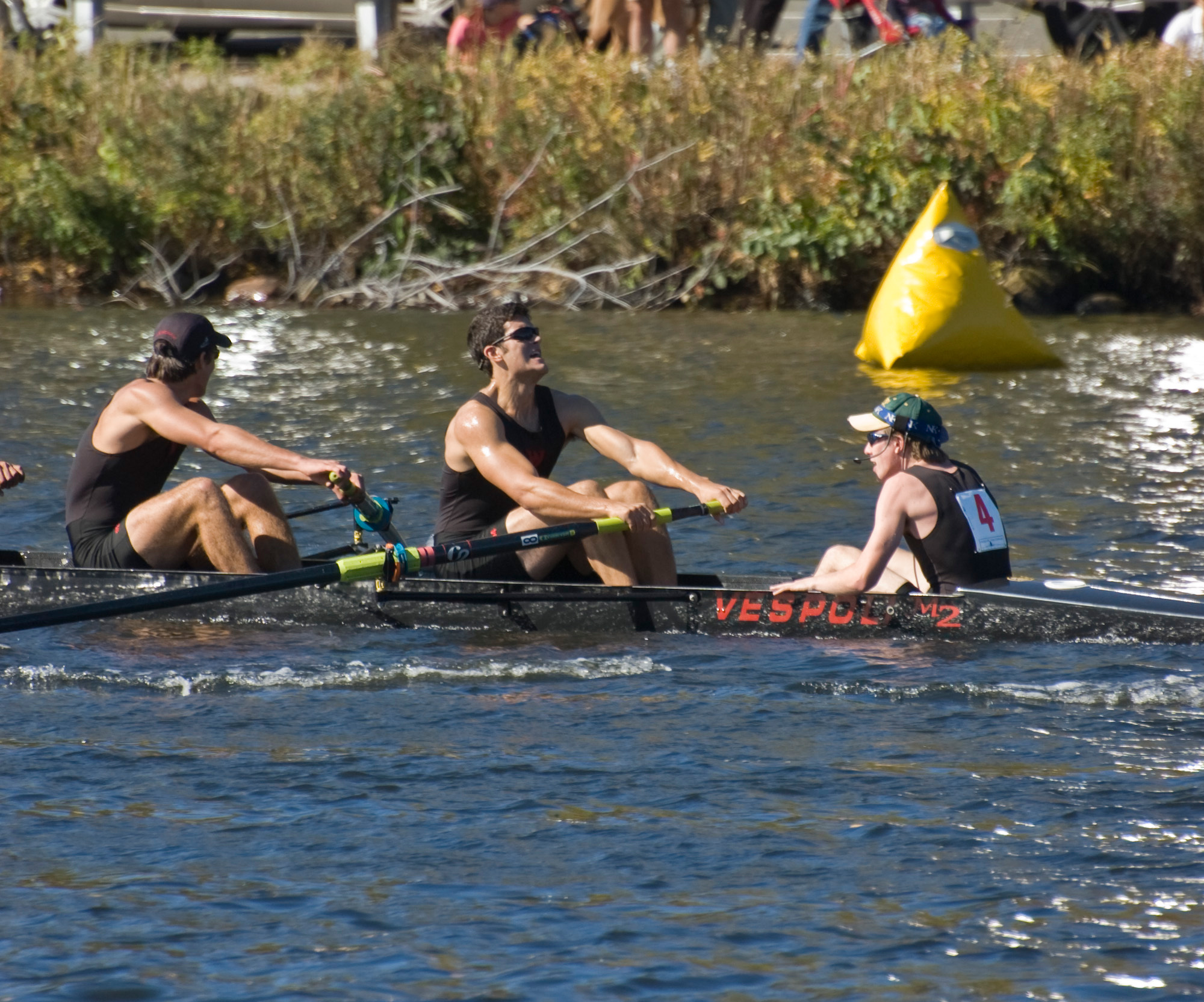
A Vespoli M2 eight at Head of the Charles Regatta

Vespoli USA is a manufacturer of rowing shells. It was founded by former Georgetown University rower and Olympian Mike Vespoli in 1980.

== History ==
The company’s origins date back to the late 1970s when Mike Vespoli was the freshman rowing coach at Yale University. It was during a trip to the Henley Royal Regatta in 1977 that he saw the forefather of the shell that changed his life. The now defunct British firm, Carbocraft Ltd, was building shells that sandwiched honeycomb between composite fibers. "I saw a very advanced shell, realizing, in America at the time, we were rowing in either traditionally built wooden shells or a wooden shell frame with fiberglass skin over it," Vespoli said. He began to augment a modest coaching salary by becoming Carbocraft's American sales representative.

After three years as Carbocraft's agent, Mike Vespoli realized importing boats led to unacceptable shortfalls in service. Customers were dissatisfied with fluctuating boat prices due to unpredictable exchange rates, an unreliable supply of spare parts, and uncertain delivery dates. In the summer of 1980, he decided to leave coaching to become a boat builder. By the fall, Mike had secured the rights to manufacture Carbocraft shells in the United States and opened a 4,000 sq ft (370 m^{2}). shop in Hamden, CT with his father and two employees, Peter Smith, a plant foreman from England, and Ed Kloman, an oarsman turned business executive. In the beginning Vespoli kept the basic Carbocraft design, which came to be known as the “A” hull model but he improved the construction techniques. Vespoli's new shells were well accepted and soon he talked the city of New Haven into selling him land for a modern boatbuilding plant.

In 1986 Vespoli moved production to its current location in New Haven. In 1988, Vespoli initiated the most comprehensive rowing shell research ever. Utilizing the talents of America’s Cup winning naval architect Bruce Nelson and hydrodynamics’ expert, Dr. Carl Scragg, they were the first to simulate shell movement in a tow tank with “unsteady” surge and pitch. Thus the “D” hull model was born. The "D" hull which became wildly accepted and praised during the 1990s had a very inauspicious start. Some contest that the United States Heavyweight Eight might have won the gold medal at the 1988 Seoul Olympics, or probably would have won the silver, instead of taking the bronze behind West Germany and the Soviet Union, if they had chosen to use the new “D” hull rather than the familiar 'A' hull, called Copenhagen Gold, which the crew preferred.

In the first half of this decade, Vespoli partnered with naval architect, Manolo Ruiz DeElvira, the principal designer of Alinghi, winner of the 2003 and 2007 America’s Cup. Manolo used to the most advanced hull design programs in the world to design Vespoli’s next generation of hulls, the “E” Hull. The "E" hull features increased stability and lower wetted surface [the dominant factor in slowing a rowing boat]. This model offers both wing and side mount rigger options.

== Models ==
- V1 - It is constructed of multiple layers of intermediate modulus, unidirectional carbon fiber and Nomex Honeycomb cured at 250 degrees. The V1 model features Vespoli’s ‘rhino skin’ (ultra-dense carbon layers) providing maximum impact resistance and stiffness.
- Millennium-2 First "Ribless" Vespoli model. Increased stiffness and cockpit room.
- Millennium - discontinued
- Ultralite II - Upgraded version of the Ultralite model. Features 100% 'Unidirectional' carbon fiber.
- Ultralite - discontinued
- Challenger - discontinued
- Racer - discontinued
- Performer - Fiberglass laminate hull construction. Very tough, resilient.

== Current models ==
- V1 (4+/x and 8+)
- M2 (4+/x and 8+)
- Ultralite II (4+/x and 8+)
- Performer(2x/-, 4+/x and 8+)
- Matrix (1x and 2x/-)
