= Racing shell =

Rowing boat designed for racing or exercise

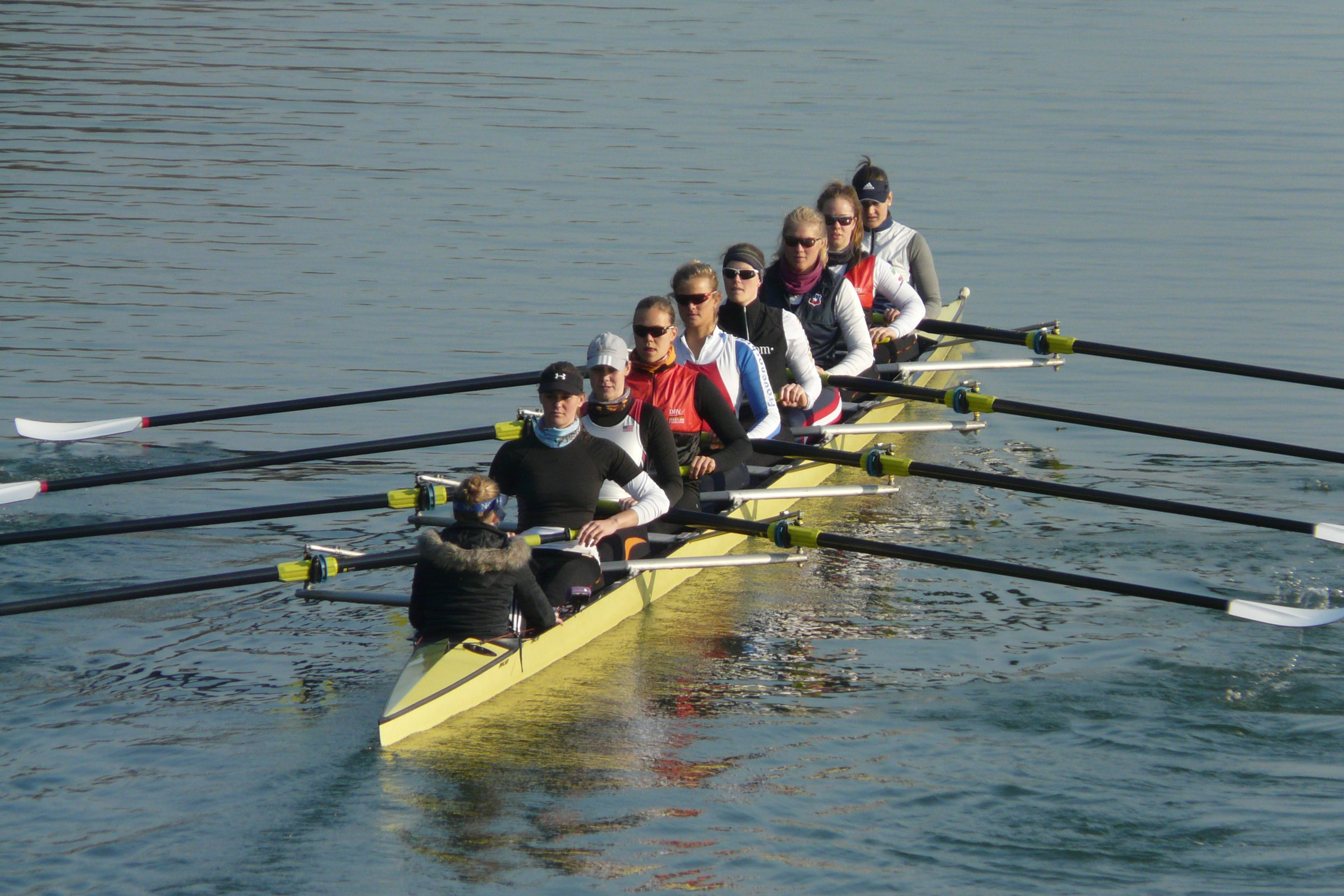
An eight (8+)

In watercraft, a racing shell (also referred to as a fine boat (UK) or simply a shell) is an extremely narrow, and often comparatively long, rowing boat specifically designed for racing or exercise. It is equipped with long oars, outriggers to hold the oarlocks away from the boat, and sliding seats. The boat's long length and semicircular cross-section reduce drag to a minimum. This makes the boat both fast and unstable. It must be balanced by the rowers to avoid tipping. Being able to balance – or "set" – the boat while putting maximum effort into the oars is therefore an essential skill of sport rowing.

== History ==
Invented on the banks of the River Tyne by Harry Clasper, The racing shell evolved from the simple working rowboat. Boats with longer hulls and narrower in beam were developed in the early 19th century specifically for team racing. These dedicated boats were the first boats that could be called racing shells, and they evolved into the highly specialized forms used today.

=== Riggers ===
A narrower boat provides a sharper angle to the bow and a smaller cross-sectional area reducing drag and wave drag. A longer boat avoids hull speed limitations at race speed. The first racing shells, while narrower than working rowboats, were limited by the width necessary to mount the oarlocks on the boat's sides ("gunwales"). By attaching outriggers to the gunwales, the oarlocks could be placed farther out. This resulted in two things: oars got much longer, providing more length to the strokes, and hulls got narrower until they were as narrow as possible while still retaining sufficient buoyancy and balance.

=== Materials ===
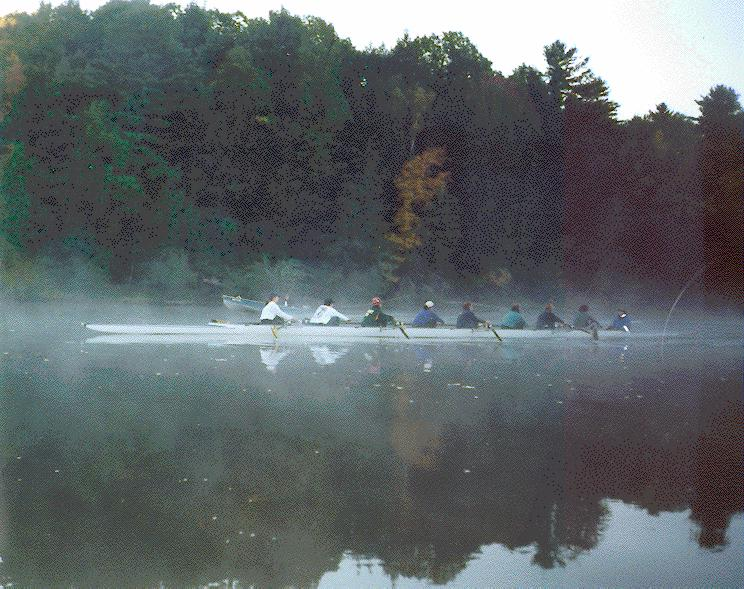
University of Vermont 8+ oar shell

Originally made from lapstrake wood, shells are now almost always made from a composite material for strength and weight advantages. The first composite shells were made from a form of papier-mâché and became popular in the 1870s. These paper shells were sold world-wide by the Waters Paper Boat Factory of Troy, New York. The next evolution of rowing shells were mainly created from thin plywood sandwiching a cardboard honeycomb structure with a fiberglass outer hull. Modern shells are usually made of carbon-fibre reinforced plastic in a honeycomb structure. They are manufactured by either cold laying up of the carbon, which is then left to set, or by using heat curing, which ensures that the carbon fibre composite is properly set. The best shells are characterized by their "stiffness", as the lack of flexing means none of the force exerted by the rower is wasted in twisting the boat.

=== Sliding seats ===
A rower on a fixed seat is limited in the amount of power they can apply to the oars by the strength in their upper body and the distance they can pull the oars on each stroke. After riggers were added to the shell allowing the use of longer oars, rowers took advantage by taking longer strokes and using their legs during the stroke. At first, the athletes wore trousers with wear resistant leather bottoms covered in grease and the shells had concave, longitudinal seats. The athletes could then use their legs to slide along the seat, adding the power of their legs and letting them greatly lengthen the stroke. This eventually led to the modern sliding seat, mounted on rollers, commonly called the slide in the rowing community, which allows nearly frictionless movement of the rower's body. Rolling seats were introduced around the year 1880. They differed from modern seats in that ball bearings were not available. Several inventors produced designs which avoided the friction which would result from use of a simple axle and bushing design. Patents were granted to Octavius Hicks (1880), George Warin (1882), and Michael F. Davis (1882). Hicks, of Etobicoke, was a boat builder, hotelier, road and bridge contractor. Warin, of Toronto, a boat builder and famous decoy maker, was coach to world rowing champion Ned Hanlan. With the advent of the sliding seat, Hanlan was able to greatly outperform his English and American counterparts. The Davis seat used rollers in a race similar to a ball bearing.

=== Sliding rigger ===
Similar advantages may be obtained by fixing the seat and mounting the outriggers on rollers. Now the athlete's body mass remains stationary and the boat doesn't pitch bow to stern nearly as much. This improves the boat speed significantly. The disadvantage is that this arrangement may result in blisters on one's buttocks and in the risk of sliding off one's seat when exerting too much explosive force at the beginning of a race . In April 1877 Michael Davis of Portland Maine applied for a patent for a sliding rigger/foot-board with fixed seat. In 1981, the German Peter-Michael Kolbe won the FISA World Championship using a sliding rigger. In August 1983 FISA banned the use of the sliding-rigger from official competitions, citing cost, complexity, and concerns over standardization.

== Boat classification ==
There are a large number of different types of racing shells. They are classified using:

- Number of rowers. In all forms of modern competition the number of rowers can be 1, 2, 4, or 8. In the 19th century, there were often races with 6, 10 and 12 rowers per boat.
- Position of coxswain. Boats are either coxless, bow-coxed (also called bowloaders), or stern-coxed. In coxless ("straight") boats, a steersman is responsible for steering by either use of a mechanism connecting one of his shoes by wire to the rudder—the swiveling of the shoe turns the rudder, or by using a hand controlled string, called a tiller rope, which is parallel to the gunwales or the boat, and controls the rudder in a similar fashion. Singles and doubles do not employ a rudder in competition; the oarsmen steer by increasing or decreasing pressure or length on one scull or the other. In competition, bow- and stern-coxed boats may race one another.
- Type of rowing. The rower(s) may each hold one oar (sweep rowing) or two oars (sculling). The shell then has one rigger or two riggers per rower.

Although sculling and sweep boats are generally identical to each other (except having different riggers), they are referred to using different names:

- Sweep: coxless pair (2-), coxed pair (2+), coxless four (4-), coxed four (4+), eight (8+) (always coxed)
- Sculling: single (1x), double (2x), straight quad (4x); also, but not in world-class competition, coxed quad (4x+), and octuple (8x+; like the 8+, always coxed.)

Other boats, such as the 3x (triple), and 24x (a traveling showboat known as the Stampfli Express) also exist, but are not racing events.

== Steering ==
Single, and double sculls are usually steered by the scullers pulling harder on one side or the other. In other boats, there is a rudder, controlled by the coxswain, if present, or by one of the crew. In the latter case, the rudder cable is attached to the toe of one of his shoes which can pivot about the ball of the foot, moving the cable left or right. The bowman may steer since he has the best vision when looking over his shoulder. On straighter courses, the strokesman may steer, since he can point the stern of the boat at some landmark at the start of the course. On international courses, landmarks for the steersmen, consisting of two aligned poles, may be provided.

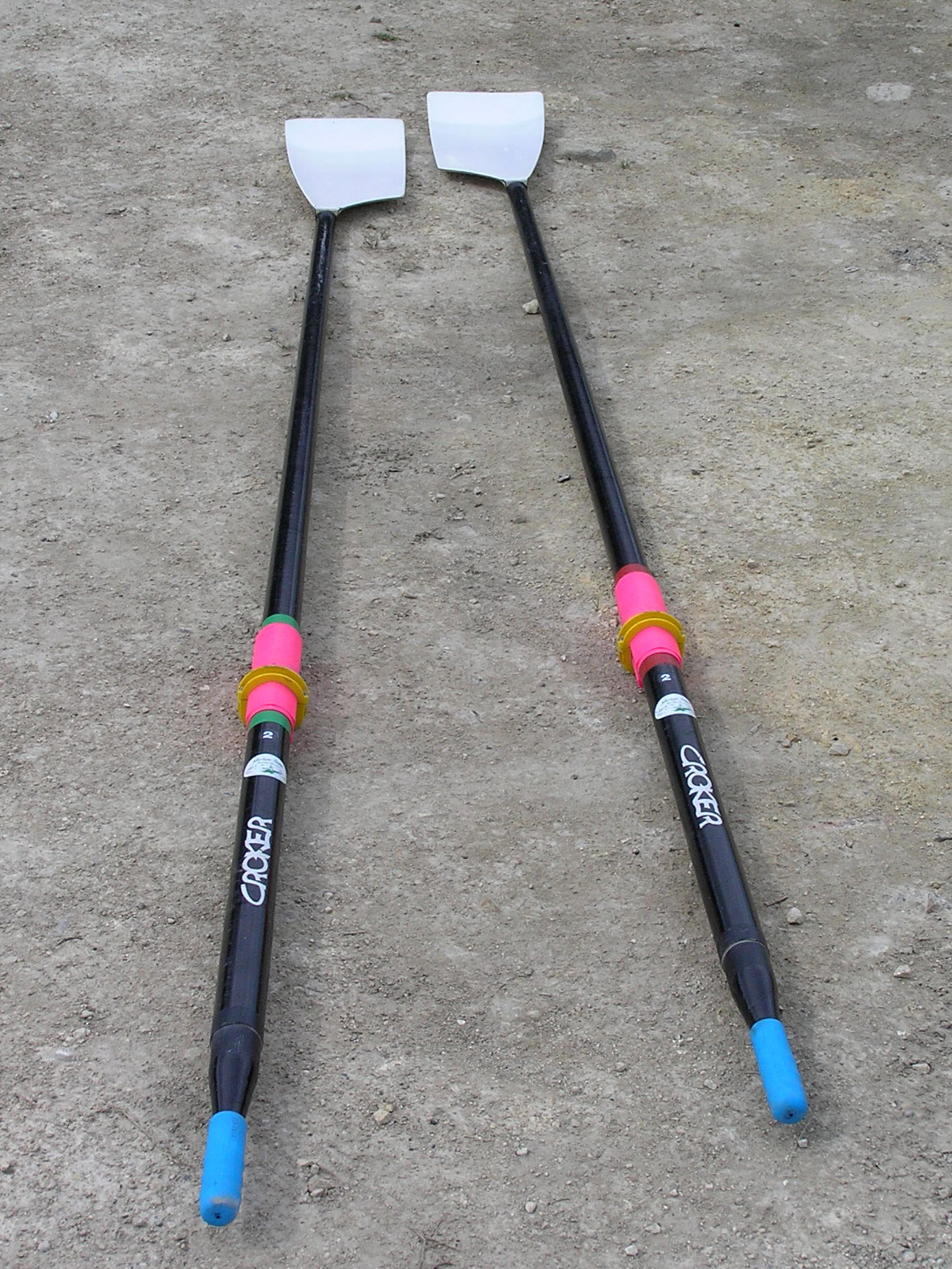
Two hatchet sculls. The "blades" are at the top and the handles at the bottom of the picture.

== Damage ==
The most commonly damaged piece of rowing equipment is the skeg, which is a metal or plastic fin that extends from the bottom of the boat to help maintain stability and to assist in steering. This protrusion renders the skeg vulnerable to damage, but it is relatively easy to replace one by gluing in a new one. Hull damage is also a concern both for maintaining equipment and for rower safety. Hull damage can be caused by submerged logs, poor strapping to trailers, and collisions with other boats, docks, rocks, etc.

== Storage ==
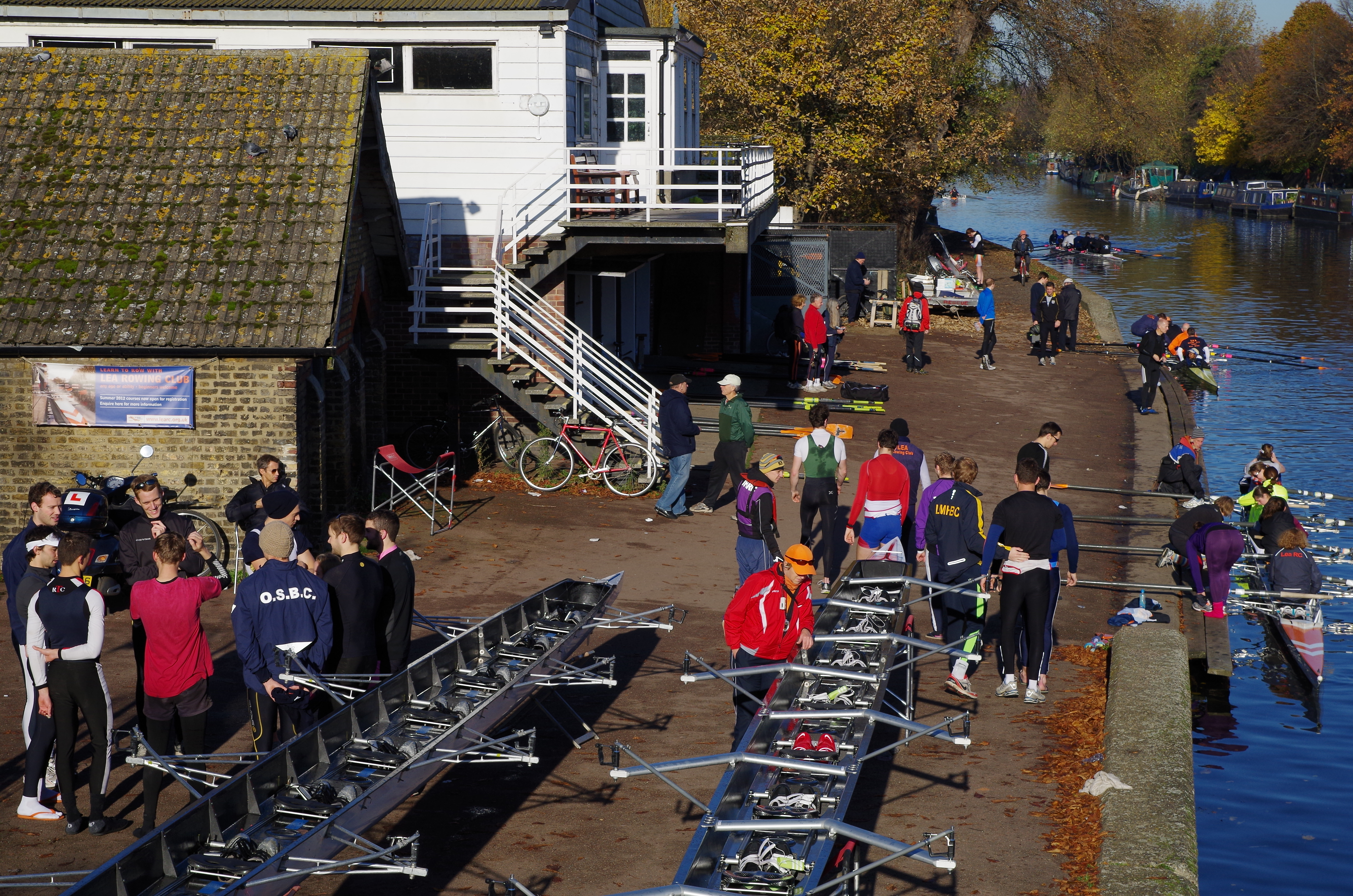
Lea Rowing Club, a local club on the Lea Navigation in London.

Racing boats are stored in boat houses. These are specially designed storage areas which usually consist of a long two-story building with a large door at one end which leads out to a pontoon or slipway on the river or lakeside. The boats are stored on racks (horizontal bars, usually metal) on the ground floor. Oars, riggers, and other equipment is stored around the boats, and there may be a workshop alongside or behind the storage areas. Boat houses are typically associated with rowing clubs and often include some social facilities on the upper floor: a cafe, bar, or gym, in addition to changing areas for the rowers.

== Manufacturers ==
There are numerous companies worldwide producing a spectrum of boats for all levels of the sport including Empacher, Filippi, Hudson, Stämpfli, and Vespoli which are renowned racing shell manufacturers.

== Transportation ==
Boats are conveyed to competitions on special trailers accommodating up to 20 boats.

== See also ==
- Rowing (sport)
- Sweep rowing
- Sculling
