= Double Sculls Challenge Cup =

Rowing competition

- Venue: Henley Royal Regatta, River Thames
- Location: Henley-on-Thames, Oxfordshire
- Dates: 1946 – present

The Double Sculls Challenge Cup is a rowing event for men's double sculls at the annual Henley Royal Regatta on the River Thames at Henley-on-Thames in England. It is open to male crews from all eligible rowing clubs. Two clubs may combine to make an entry.

On the centenary of the regatta in 1939 a Centenary Double Sculls event was introduced. The crews in the final were Jack Beresford and Dick Southwood of Thames Rowing Club against Giorgio Scherli and Ettore Broschi of Trieste, who were the reigning European champions. The result was a dead-heat.

== Past winners ==
Key

- L = Lengths
- E = Easily
- NRO = Not rowed out

=== 1946 to 1999 ===
Year	Winning crew	Club	Time	Distance	Runner-up	Club	ref
1946	Rafael E. Panelo; Ergasto D. Chafuen	Buenos Aires RC, ARG	8.8	4 L	Guy Newton; Humphrey Warren	Trinity Hall, Cm	
1947	Wally E. C. Horwood; David C. H. Garrod	Quintin Boat Club	8.23	4 L	Frantisek Vrba; Jaroslav Vavrena	Cesky AC, CZE	
1948	Ben Piessens; Willy Collet	Belgian Royal RF	8.2	2 L	Wally E. C. Horwood; David C. H. Garrod	Quintin Boat Club	
1949	Ebbe Parsner; Aage Larsen	DFDS Roklubb, DEN	7.39	2 1/2 L	Jack B. Brown; Ken Tinegate	Loughborough BC; Birmingham RC	
1950	Ebbe Parsner; Aage Larsen	DFDS Roklubb, DEN	8.21	E	Jack B. Brown; Ken Tinegate	Loughborough BC; Birmingham RC	
1951	Pat Bradley; Dickie Burnell	Leander Club	8.41	2 L	B. Glyn Davies; A. A. Paddy Kemp	Reading Rowing Club	
1952	Robert George; Jos Van Stichel	UNdL & A, BEL	7.37	E	John Rodgers; Murray Riley	Sydney Rowing Club, AUS	
1953	Erich Schriever; Peter Stebler	Seeclub, Zurich, SWI	7.37	E	C. E. 'Ted' Poynter; W T J Baker	Bedford Rowing Club	
1954	Erich Schriever; Peter Stebler	Seeclub, Zurich, SWI	8.46	E	Graham Beech; Ken Tinegate	Birmingham RC	
1955	Heorhiy Zhylin; Igor Emchuk	Club Burevestnik, USSR	7.55	1/2 L	Hansruedi Vollmer; Thomas Keller	Grasshopper Club, Zurich	
1956	Sidney Rand; Bill Rand	Royal Air Force	7.47	1 1/2 L	John Marsden; Doug Melvin	London Rowing Club	
1957	Aleksandr Berkutov; Yuriy Tyukalov	Club Krasnoe Z, USSR	7.41	E	Geoff Baker; Mike Spracklen	Marlow Rowing Club; Royal Air Force	
1958	Aleksandr Berkutov; Yuriy Tyukalov	Trud Club, Leningrad, USSR	7.21	E	Geoff Baker; Mike Spracklen	Marlow Rowing Club	
1959	Christopher Davidge; Stuart Mackenzie	Leander Club	7.55	2 3/4 L	George Justicz; Nicholas Birkmyre	Birmingham RC; Bristol Ariel RC	
1960	George Justicz; Nicholas Birkmyre	Birmingham RC; Bristol Ariel RC	7.17	1 3/4 L	Bernard Monnereau; René Duhamel	CNeAdRouen, FRA	
1961	George Justicz; Nicholas Birkmyre	Birmingham RC; Bristol Ariel RC	7.38	1 3/4 L	Aleksandr Berkutov; Yuriy Tyukalov	Trud & Dynamo, USSR	
1962	George Justicz; Nicholas Birkmyre	Leander Club	7.39	E	David N. Joyce; Alex Maclehose	Exeter College, Oxford; Corpus Christi	
1963	Max Alwin; Willem van der Togt	Rv Willem III; Skadi RC, NED	7.30	2 L	Bernard Monnereau; René Duhamel	CN de Rouen, FRA	
1964	George Justicz; Nicholas Birkmyre	Leander Club	7.32	3/4L	Hans Frederiksen; Ibs J. Kruse	Dansk SR, DEN	
1965	Martin Studach; Melchior Bürgin	Grasshopper Club, Zurich	7.1	1 2/3 L	Manfred Haake; Jochen Brückhändler	TSC Berlin, GDR	
1966	Manfred Haake; Jochen Brückhändler	TSC Berlin, GDR	7.20	3 3/4 L	Nick Cooper; Arnold Cooke	Leander Club	
1967	Martin Studach; Melchior Bürgin	Grasshopper Club, Zurich	7.47	1 1/4 L	Klaus Schabitz; Joachim Böhmer	SG Dynamo, Potsdam, GDR	
1968	Pat A. Barry; Dick. M. Findlay	Tideway Scullers; Nat Prov Bank	9.18	2 L	Tony J. Cowley; Nigel S. Drake	St Ives Rowing Club	
1969	Denis Oswald; Melchior Bürgin	Grasshopper RC, Zurich	7.35	3 L	Tony J. Cowley; Nigel S. Drake	St Ives Rowing Club	
1970	Thomas McKibbon; John Van Blom	Long Beach RA, USA	7.43	3 1/2 L	Peter Webb; Arnold Cooke	Nottingham & Union RC	
1971	Mike A. Brigden; Chris A. Brigden	Walton Rowing Club	8.21	1 L	B. Balmer; George G. Parsonage	Scottish Argonauts BC	
1972	Patrick Delafield; Tim Crooks	Leander Club	7.24	1 2/3 L	Lawrence Klecatsky; Jim Dietz	New York AC, USA	
1973	Michael Hart; Chris Baillieu	Leander Club; Cambridge Univ BC	7.11	4 1/2 L	Ueli Isler; Hans E. Ruckstahl	SeeClub Stafa; Zurich, SWI	
1974	Gennadi Korshikov; Aleksandr Timoshinin	Dynamo Club, USSR	7.23	2 1/2 L	Ueli Isler; Hans E. Ruckstahl	SeeClub Stafa; Zurich, SWI	
1975	Michael Hart; Chris Baillieu	Leander Club	7.23	E	Peter Levy; K. B. Gee	Weybridge Rowing Club; Molesey Boat Club	
1976	Bobby Prentice; Martin Samuel Spencer	London Rowing Club	7.22	2 L	J. H. van Drooge; R. Nolet	ASR Nereus, NED	
1977	Michael Hart; Chris Baillieu	Leander Club	7.20	E	R. Gregg Stone; Christopher R. Tiff Wood	Harvard University, USA	
1978	Michael Hart; Chris Baillieu	Leander Club	7.44	E	Martin Samuel Spencer; Bobby Prentice	Poplar Blackwall & District RC	
1979	Jim Clark; Chris Baillieu	Thames Tradesmen's RC; Leander Club	7.32	E	Andrew Rudkin; Ian Gold	Bewl Bridge; Poplar Blackwall & District RC	
1980	Pat Walter; Bruce Ford	Victoria City RC, CAN	7.27	2 L	Chris Allsopp; Christopher R. Tiff Wood	Hartford Bridge-Univ Wash, USA	
1981	Eric R. Sims; Steve Redgrave	Maidenhead RC; Marlow Rowing Club	8.16	E	Andy M. Riddle; Brian A. May	Dart Amateur RC; Staines Boat Club	
1982	Adam Clift; Steve Redgrave	Marlow Rowing Club	7.55	3 1/2 l.	Neil Staite; Jonathan Spencer-Jones	Evesham Rowing Club; Bewdley Rowing Club	
1983	Jonathan Spencer-Jones; Chris Baillieu	Bewdley; Leander Club	7.27	3 L	Paul Johnson; Neil Staite	Tees Rowing Club; Evesham Rowing Club	
1984	Morten Espersen; Leif Kruse	Bagsvaerd; Kolding Rks	7.25	1 1/4 L	Tim Crooks; Hugh Matheson	Kingston Rowing Club; NCRA	
1985	Bjarne Eltang; Leif Kruse	Kolding; Danske Rk, DEN	7.14	3 1/4 L	Brad Alan Lewis; Greg Springer	Dirty Dozen RC, USA	
1986	Jeff I. Parks; Dan M. Chernoff	Charles River RA, USA	7.32	3 1/2 L	Rob C. Luke; Lewis Hancock	Llandaff Rowing Club; Derwent Rowing Club	
1987	Nikolai Chouprina; Valeriy Dosenko	Dinamo Moscow, USSR	7.21	E	Julian D. M. Scrivener; Rorie Henderson	Lea Rowing Club	
1988	Andrew C. Rudkin; A. Philip S. Kittermaster	Tideway Scullers; Barclays	7.26	1/2 L	Julian D. M. Scrivener; Rorie Henderson	Lea Rowing Club	
1989	Ronald Florijn; Nico Rienks	Die Leythe; Okeanos, NED	7.4	5 L	Pavel Lůžek; Ivan Gruza	Dukla Praha, CZE	
1990	Andrew C. Rudkin; A. Philip S. Kittermaster	Tideway Scullers; Barclays	8.28	1 3/4 L	Mark B. Alloway; Chris F. Williams	Tideway Scullers	
1991	Bjarne Eltang; Hans Bang	Danske; Fana Roklubs, NOR	7.32	E	Rob C. Luke; Chris J. Skuse	Leander Club	
1992	Don C. Dickerson; Todd Hallett	Mic Mac; Fredricton, CAN	6.57	1 1/4 L	Dilo Kruyswyk; Pieter Wiltenburg	AGSR Gyas; Skadi Rowing Club, NED	
1993	Ned Kittoe; Rupert F. Redpath	London Rowing Club; Tyrian	7.32	2 ft (0.61 m)	Ian W. Hopkins; Mark Pollecutt	Molesey Boat Club	
1994	Gábor Mitring; Zsolt Dani	MTK-Gyori Vizugyi Se, HUN	7.7	2 1/2 L	Peter Uhrig; Christian Händle	Wormser RC; Karlstadt, GER	
1995	Marcus D. Free; Peter Antonie	Tweed Heads RC; Melbourne Univ BC	6.58	2 ft (0.61 m)	Brian Jamieson; Dave. J Gleeson	Augusta RC, USA	
1996	Greg Walker; Greg Lewis	Potomac BC; National TC, USA	7.7	3 L	Günter Schneider; Jürg Habermayr	RC Thalwil; Seeclub Thun, SWI	
1997	Marcus. D Free; Duncan Free	Tweed Heads RC, AUS	6.58	E	Barry A. Klein; Ranson J. Weaver	Undine Barge Club, USA	
1998	Yvan Deslavière; Frédéric Kowal	Aviron Marne et Joinville; Cercle Aviron de Nogent, FRA	7.17	3 L	Greg Ruckman; Steve Tucker	Augusta SC, USA	
1999	Ian McGowan; Nick Peterson	Augusta SC, USA	7.44	3 L	Conal Groom; Steve Tucker	Augusta SC, USA	

==== Gallery ====
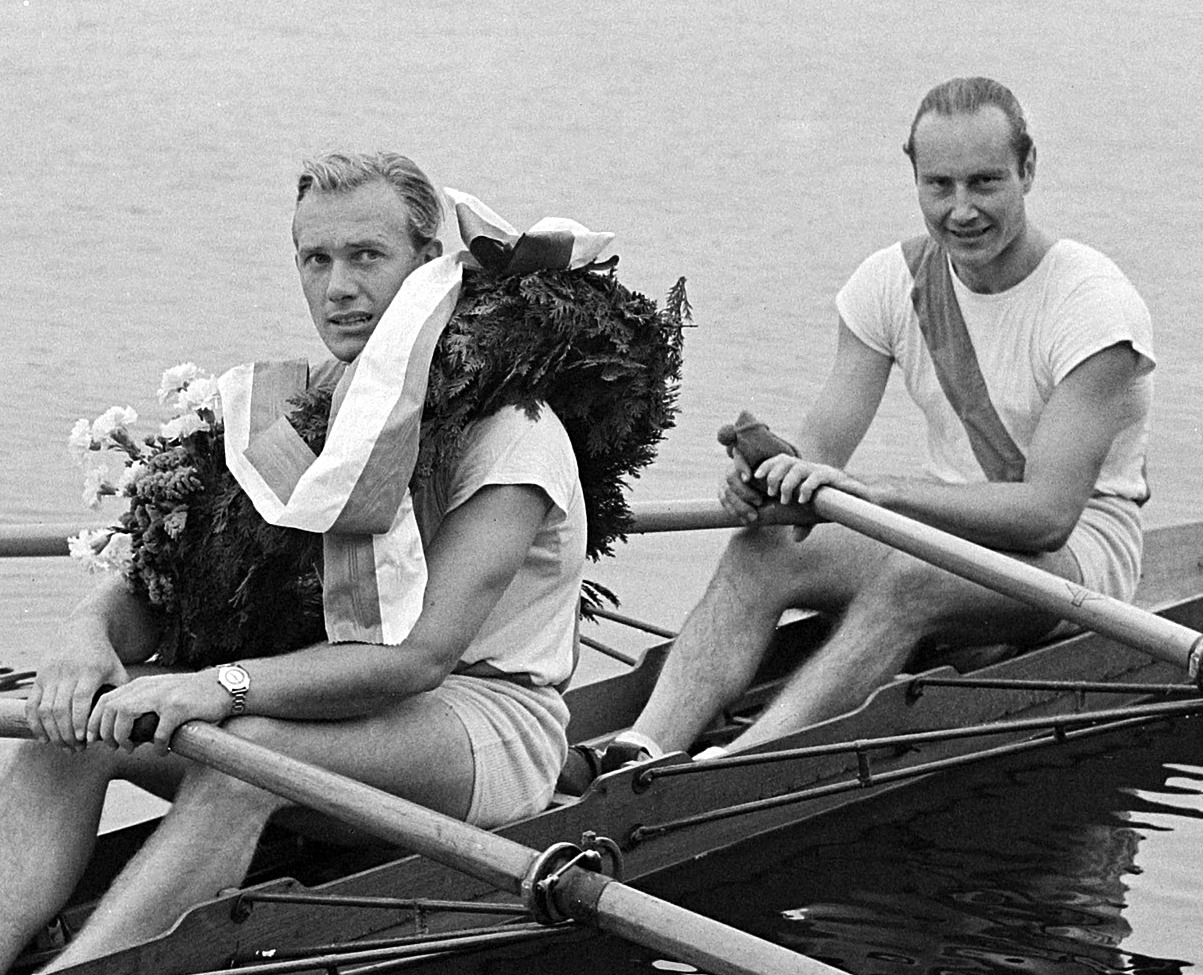
Twice winners Aage Larsen and Ebbe Parsner

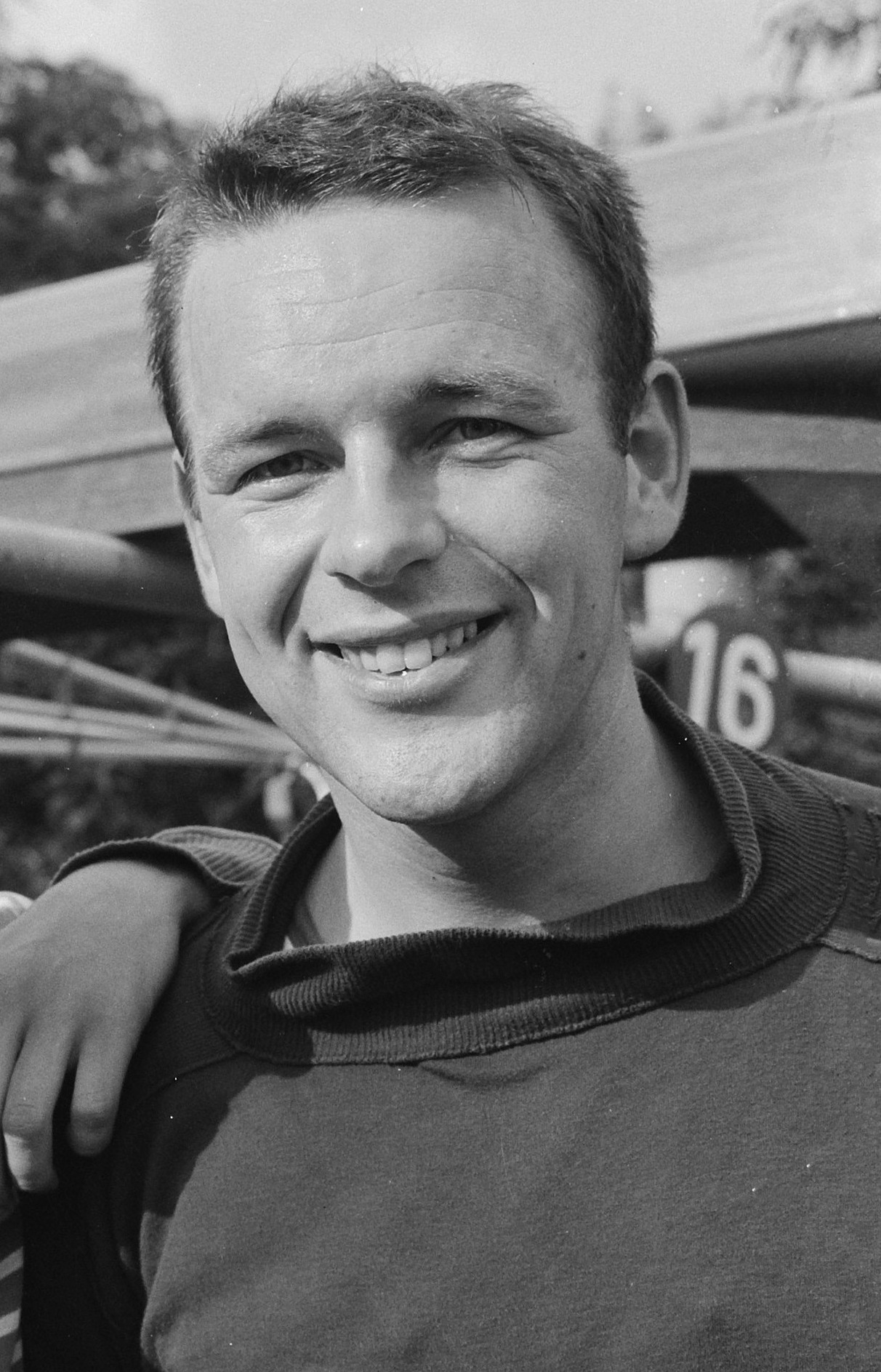
1963 winner Max Alwin

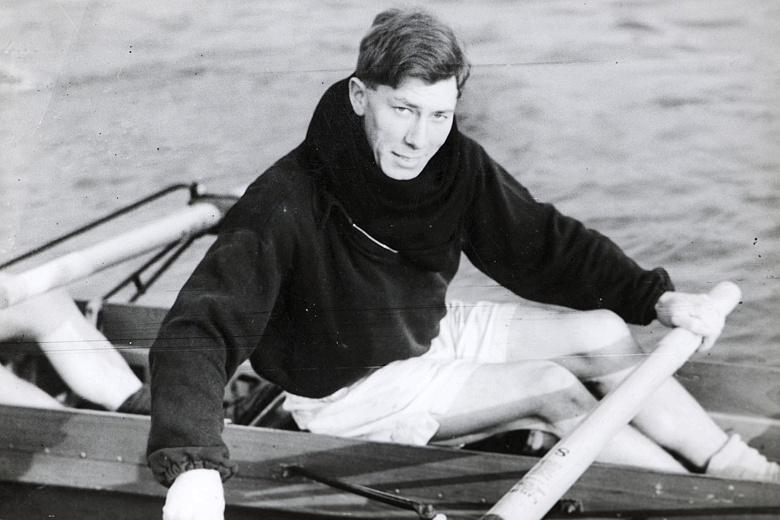
Chris Davidge, 1959 winner

=== 2000 onwards ===
Year	Winning crew	Club	Time	Distance	Runner-up	Club	ref
2000	Bo Kaliszan; Bertil Samuelson	Danmarks Rocenter	7.28	E	Matt K. Langridge; Pete J. C. Wells	Leander Club; Queen Elizabeth HS	
2001	Tomasz Kucharski; Robert Sycz	AZS Gorzow; AZS, POL	7.26	4 L	Pete P. Gardner; Ian P. Lawson	Leander Club	
2002	Sébastien Vieilledent; Adrien Hardy	RC de Cannes, FRA	7.32	4 L	Ákos Haller; Tibor Pető	Szegedi Vizisport, HUN	
2003	Benedikt Mueller; Matthias Weiss	Heilbronner RC; Mainzer RuderVerein, GER	7.18	3 L	Martin S. Inglis; Tristan Pascall	Mosman RC, AUS	
2004	Péter Lőrinczy; Kornel Szabo	Ganz Villany RC; Tisza RC, HUN	7.47	2 2/3 L	Simon D. Goodbrand; Guy B. Blanchard	Rob Roy BC	
2005	Mark Hunter; James W. Lindsay-Fynn	London Rowing Club; Leander Club	7.26	E	Ivo M. Snijders; Alwin F. Snijders	A.S.R. Nereus; D.S.R Proteus-Eretes, NED	
2006	Matt Wells; Stephen C. Rowbotham	Leander Club; Univof London	7.08	NRO	Luka Špik; Iztok Čop	Veslaski Klub Bled, SVN	
2007	Luka Špik; Iztok Čop	Veslaski Klub Bled, SVN	7.33	5 L	Michał Słoma; Marcin Brzeziński	WTW Warszawa; AZS Toruń, POL	
2008	Wes D. Pierarini; Elliot Hovey	California RC, USA	7.35	1 1/4 L	Peter F. Graves; Thomas H. Graves	Bantam BC, USA	
2009	Matthew C. Trott; Nathan Cohen	Waiariki RC, NZL	7.42	1 L	Matt Wells; Stephen C. Rowbotham	Leander Club	
2010	Cédric Berrest; Julien Bahain	Club France,	7.38	NRO	Matt Wells; R. Marcus Bateman	Leander Club	
2011	Matt Wells; R. Marcus Bateman	Leander Club	6.52	2 1/2 L	David W. Crawshay; Scott M. Brennan	Australian Institute of Sport	
2012	John E. Collins; Alan J. Sinclair	Leander Club	7.35	4 1/4 L	Alexander Bernsten; Hans Magnus Grepperud	Oslo Kraftsenter, NOR	
2013	Michael A. N. Arms; Robbie Manson	Waiariki RC, NZL	6:48	2 L	Bill P. Lucas; Matt K. Langridge	London Rowing Club; Leander Club	
2014	Stany Delayre; Jérémie Azou	France	7:17	3 ft (0.91 m)	John E. Collins; Jonathan F. L. Walton	Leander Club	
2015	John Collins; Jonathan F. L. Walton	Leander Club	7:23	2 1/3 L	James M. Thompson; John E. Smith	Univ of Pretoria, RSA	
2016	Nick C. Middleton; Jack Beaumont	Leander Club	7:27	4 1/2 L	Gašper Fistravec; Dani Fridman	Veslaški Klub Maribor, SVN; Tiberias Rowing Club, ISR	
2017	John Storey; Chris Harris	Waiariki RC, NZL	6:49	1 1/4 L	Pierre Houin; Jérémie Azou	Club France	
2018	Angus Groom; Jack Beaumont	Leander Club	6:46	1/5 L	Paul O'Donovan; Gary O'Donovan	Skibbereen RC, IRE	
2019	John E. Collins; Graeme Thomas	Leander Club; Agecroft RC	6.44	1L	John Storey; Chris Harris	Waiariki RC, NZL	
2020	No competition due to COVID-19 pandemic						
2021	Fintan McCarthy; Paul O'Donovan	Skibbereen RC; University College, Cork	7.13	1 3/4 L	Sam Meijer; Matt Haywood	Tideway Scullers School; Nottingham Rowing Club	
2022	Jack Cleary; Caleb Antill	Rowing Australia	6.56	1/3 L	Sam Meijer; Matt Haywood	Tideway Scullers; Nottingham RC	
2023	Aleix Garcia; Rodrigo Conde	Club Natació Banyoles; Club Remo do Miño, ESP	7.19	5 L	Aidan Thompson; John Collins	Twickenham Rowing Club; Leander Club	
2024	Jamie Gare; Cedol Dafydd	Leander Club	7.25	2L	Cedar Cunningham; Casey Fuller	Penn ACRC, USA; Saugatuck RC, U.S.A.	
2025	Finlay Hamill; Ben Mason	Waiariki Rowing Club	6.54	1L	Oscar McGuinness; Mitchell Reinhard	Rowing Australia	
