= Donald Spero =

American physicist, venture capitalist, and rower

Personal information
- Born: August 8, 1939 (age 87) Chicago, Illinois, U.S.
- Height: 1.88 m (6 ft 2 in)
- Weight: 86 kg (190 lb)

Sport
- Sport: Rowing
- Club: New York Athletic Club, New York
Medal record
Representing United States
World Rowing Championships
Gold medal – first place	1966 Bled	Single sculls
European Rowing Championships
Silver medal – second place	1963 Copenhagen	Double sculls
Bronze medal – third place	1964 Amsterdam	Single sculls
Diamond Challenge Sculls
Gold medal – first place	1965 Henley-on-Thames	Single sculls
Gold Cup Challenge
Gold medal – first place	1966 Philadelphia	Single sculls

Donald M. Spero (born August 9, 1939) is an American physicist, venture capitalist, and a former U.S. and world champion rower who competed at the 1964 Summer Olympics and won the single sculls 1966 World Rowing Championships. He also won a gold medal at the 1961 Maccabiah Games in the coxed four, and won the 1963 and 1964 U.S. national championships. He was elected to the Helms/Rowing Hall of Fame, Cornell University Hall of Fame, New York Athletic Club Hall of Fame, and International Jewish Sports Hall of Fame.

== Early life and education ==
Spero was born in Chicago, Illinois, and is Jewish. He received his degree in Engineering Physics with honors in 1962 from Cornell University, where he was a member of the Quill and Dagger society and elected to Tau Beta Pi. He received a Ph.D. in Plasma Physics from Columbia University, and performed post-doctoral work in Physics at the University of Maryland.

Spero rowed for the New York Athletic Club. He lives in Bethesda, Maryland.

== Rowing career ==
As a freshman at Cornell University in 1957, Spero was unaware of the competitive sport of rowing. He was in the Cornell freshman eight that won the 1958 Intercollegiate Rowing Association (IRA) Championship under coach Carl F. Ullrich. During his next three years on the varsity squad under the Cornell coach R. H. (Stork) Sanford, Spero was a member of two more championship crews.

His first international competition came at the World 1961 Maccabiah Games, when he won a gold medal in the coxed four, along with coxswain and coach Allen Rosenberg.

He took up sculling in 1963, winning the U.S. National Championships in single sculls against the former national champion Seymour Cromwell. Together he and Cromwell won the 1963 U.S. National Championship in double sculls, and went on to bring the U.S. a silver medal in the European Rowing Championships in Copenhagen, behind the Czechs and ahead of the Russians. In 1964 Spero joined the New York Athletic Club and won his second U.S. Single Sculls Championship.

He then represented the United States at the 1964 Summer Olympics at Tokyo in the single sculls. Spero defeated the reigning Olympic champion Vyacheslav Ivanov of the U.S.S.R in the preliminary heats, advancing to the finals and finishing sixth. Also in 1964, he won a bronze medal in the single sculls at the European Championships in Amsterdam.

In 1965, Spero trained on Lake Zurich with Martin Studach and Melchior Bürgin and went with them to Henley Royal Regatta, where he won the Diamond Challenge Sculls (the premier singles sculls event) and Studach and Bürgin won the Double Sculls Challenge Cup, both setting new Henley course records. Spero also won the gold medal at the 1965 Duisburg International Regatta and the U.S. Quadruple sculls championship. In 1966, he repeated as U.S. Champion in Single Sculls.

Then at the 1966 World Rowing Championships in Bled, Yugoslavia, he became the World Single Sculls Champion, defeating the Olympic champion Ivanov.

Spero was also a founder of the National Rowing Foundation in 1966, and was a director from 1967 to 1984.

He was elected to the Helms/Rowing Hall of Fame in 1966, Cornell University Hall of Fame in 1984, New York Athletic Club Hall of Fame in 1986, and International Jewish Sports Hall of Fame in 1993.

== Business career ==
Spero conducted post-doctoral research in physics at the University of Maryland, which resulted in the development of high intensity microwave lamps. This became the core technology for Fusion Systems Corporation, which he co-founded in 1972 and of which he served as president and CEO for 21 years. The company had a successful initial public offering in 1994, and was subsequently acquired by Heraeus Technology Group.

In 1992 he founded Spero Quality Strategies, a strategic advisory and angel investing firm. In 2000 Spero was recruited to be Director of the Dingman Center for Entrepreneurship, University of Maryland, Smith School of Business. In 2002 Spero co-founded New Markets Venture Partners, of which he is a General Partner.
