= Gillian Lindsay =

Scottish rower (born 1973)

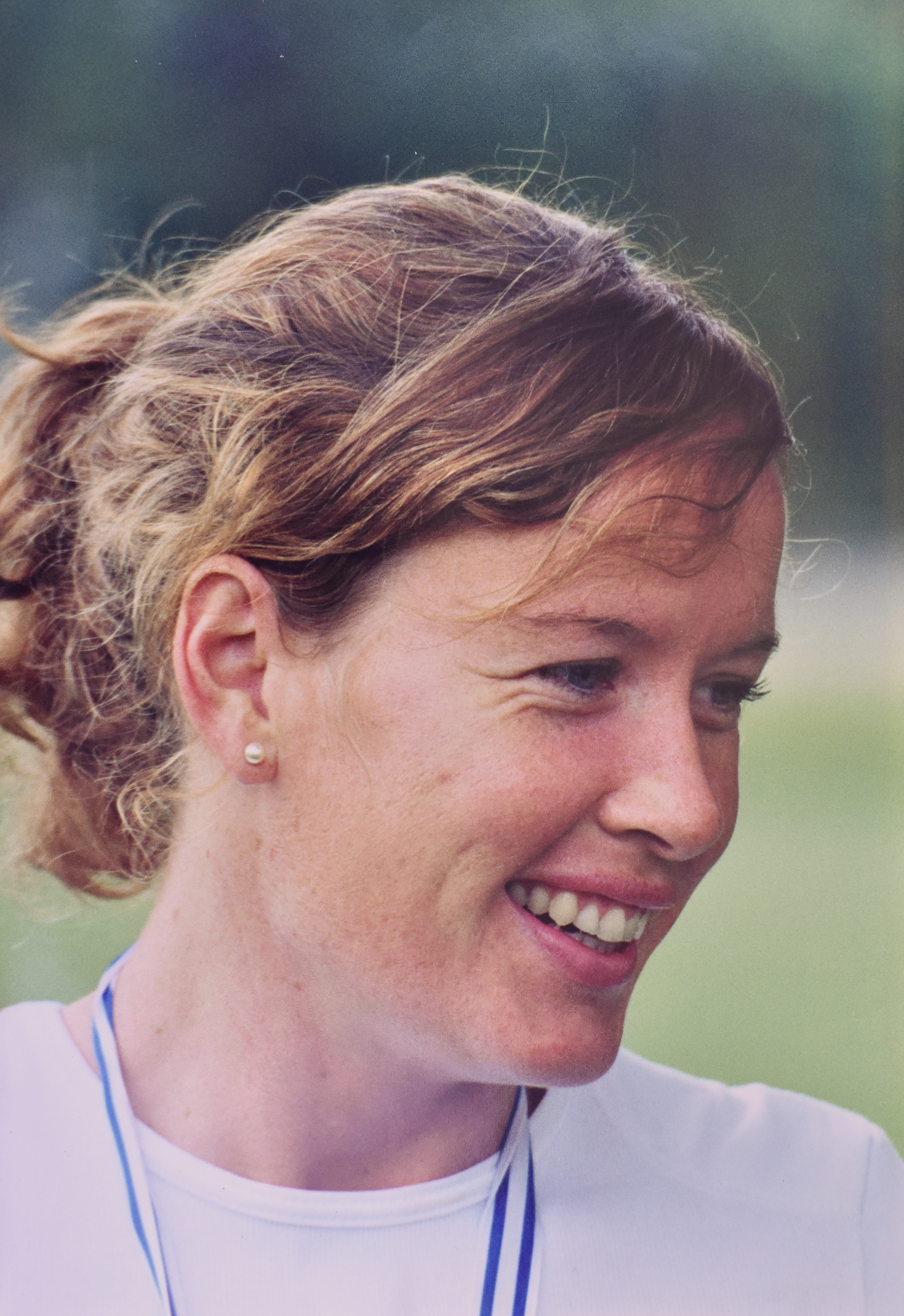
- Lindsay in 1999

Personal information
- National team: Great Britain
- Born: 24 September 1973 (age 52) Paisley, Scotland
- Height: 183 cm (6 ft 0 in)

Sport
- Sport: Women's rowing
- Event(s): Double Sculls, Quadruple Sculls
- Club: Clydesdale Amateur Rowing Club, Marlow Rowing Club
- Coached by: Mike Spracklen
Medal record
Representing Great Britain
Women's rowing
Event	1st	2nd	3rd
Olympic Games	0	1	0
World Championships	1	1	0
Total	1	2	0
Olympic Games
Silver medal – second place	2000 Sydney	Quadruple sculls
World Championships
Gold medal – first place	1998 Cologne	Double scull
Silver medal – second place	1997 Aiguebelette	Double scull

Gillian Lindsay (born 24 September 1973, in Paisley) is a former Team GB Scottish rower. She won silver in the quadruple sculls at the 2000 Summer Olympics silver medalist, and two-time medal winner in the World Championships, taking silver in the double sculls in 1997 and gold in 1998. Since her retirement in 2001, she has focused on coaching and commentating.

== Career ==
=== Rowing ===
Encouraged by her former PE teacher, Gillian began rowing at age 13 while a pupil at St Andrew's Academy, Paisley. She trained at Clydesdale Amateur Rowing Club before being selected to join the senior GB international team at age 18 where she was coached by Mike Spracklen. She had her first taste of the Olympic Games in Barcelona in 1992, as part of in the women's coxless fours, coming in eighth. In 1997, she and partner Miriam Batten took silver in the double sculls at the 1997 World Rowing Championships at Aiguebelette-le-Lac. The following year, they won gold at the 1998 World Rowing Championships at Cologne. She won silver at the 2000 Olympic Games in Sydney, in the woman's quadruple sculls alongside crewmates Guin Batten, Katherine Grainger and Miriam Batten. At the time of her retirement from competition she was Britain's most successful woman sculler of all time.

=== Coaching ===
She was Head of Rowing at The Lady Eleanor Holles School until moving on to teach Sports science at The Mount School, York in 2014. She was Head of Rowing at Wimbledon High School.

=== Commentating ===
She is a regular expert commentator on rowing events for Eurosport sports network.

=== Awards ===
In 2021, Gillian won the Scottish Women in Sport Pioneer Award, given in recognition of 'a woman/women or team who through their work in sport, which would largely have gone unrecognised, whether on or off the field, has empowered and inspired women and girls to participate in sport today'. She was presented with her award by her former crewmate, Katherine Grainger, who was guest of honour at the event.
