= George Justice =

George Justice may refer to:

- George Justicz, British rower
- George Justice (mariner), South Australian mariner
