= Nicholas Birkmyre =

British rower (born 1937)

Nick Birkmyre
Personal information
- Born: 21 February 1937 (age 89) Cranleigh, England
- Height: 187 cm (6 ft 2 in)
- Weight: 87 kg (192 lb)

Sport
- Sport: Rowing
- Club: Bristol Ariel RC; Leander Club
Medal record
Men's rowing
Representing England
British Empire and Commonwealth Games
Gold medal – first place	1962 Perth	Double sculls
Representing Great Britain
European Championships
Silver medal – second place	1961 Prague	Double sculls

Nicholas John Birkmyre (born 21 February 1937) is a former rower who competed for Great Britain in the 1960 Olympic games and won Double Sculls Challenge Cup at Henley Royal Regatta four times.

== Biography ==
Birkmyre was born at Cranleigh, Surrey, and was educated at Radley College. He became a member of Bristol Ariel Rowing Club. In 1959, partnering George Justicz, he was runner up at the Double Sculls Challenge Cup at Henley Royal Regatta. In 1960 the pair won the Double Sculls Challenge Cup and went on to compete in the double sculls at the 1960 Summer Olympics in Rome, where they did not advance beyond the repechage. Birkmyre and Justicz won the double sculls at Henley again in 1961 and won a silver medal at the 1961 European Rowing Championships. They then joined Leander Club and in 1962 won the double sculls at Henley, came fifth in the 1962 World Rowing Championships.

He represented England and won a gold medal in the double sculls at the 1962 British Empire and Commonwealth Games in Perth, Western Australia. They made their final winning appearance in the double sculls at Henley 1964.

Birkmyre became a farmer at Great Witley, Worcestershire and has been an active supporter of the community.

Birkmyre married Patricia Anne Somers, an accomplished horsewoman and skier, in 1963 and had two daughters; Sarah and Janet. Janet won three elite British National Championships titles in track cycling, as well as over 100 age group titles at a World, European and National level, setting several World Masters World Records.
