= Melchior Bürgin =

Swiss rower

Personal information
- Born: 17 October 1943 (age 82) Eptingen, Switzerland
- Height: 189 cm (6 ft 2 in)
- Weight: 80 kg (176 lb)

Sport
- Sport: Rowing
- Club: Grasshopper Club Zürich
Medal record
Representing Switzerland
World Rowing Championships
Gold medal – first place	1966 Bled	Double sculls
European Rowing Championships
Bronze medal – third place	1964 Amsterdam	Double sculls
Gold medal – first place	1965 Duisburg	Double sculls
Gold medal – first place	1967 Vichy	Double sculls

Melchior Rudolf Bürgin (born 17 October 1943) is a former Swiss rower who competed at the 1964, 1968 and 1972 Summer Olympics.

Bürgin partnered Martin Studach in the double sculls rowing for Switzerland at the 1964 Summer Olympics when they came fourth. Over next three years, Bürgin and Studach dominated the double sculls scene. In 1965 they won the Double Sculls Challenge Cup at Henley Royal Regatta and the European Championships. In 1966 they won the World Championships. They won the European Championships and the double sculls at Henley again in 1967. Bürgin and Studach rowed in the double sculls for Switzerland at the 1968 Summer Olympics, but at the altitude in Mexico Studach suffered a collapse through over-exertion in the heats. Bürgin went two more rounds with substitute Hans Ruckstuhl.

Burgin won the double sculls at Henley again in 1969 partnering Denis Oswald. Bürgin competed for Switzerland at the 1972 Summer Olympics in the Single scull and reached the final to come sixth.

Burgin was a long-time employee of Stämpfli, a Swiss boat building company, and took over it in the 1980s when Alfred Stämpfli retired.
