= Graham Beech =

English rower

Walter Graham Beech (6 August 1924 – 10 May 1993) was an English rower who won the Wingfield Sculls, the amateur championship of the Thames in 1957.

Beech started rowing with Birmingham Rowing Club in 1954. Partnering Ken Tinegate he was runner up in the Double Sculls Challenge Cup at Henley Royal Regatta in 1954. He joined London Rowing Club in 1957. Although he lost to Teodor Kocerka in the semi-final of the Diamond Challenge Sculls at Henley, later in 1957 he won the Wingfield Sculls beating Sidney Rand by half a length.

Beech – "one of London Rowing Club's more colourful members" – died of a heart attack in 1993 in Lincoln.
