= Jamie Koven =

American rower (born 1973)

Personal information
- Born: April 18, 1973 (age 53) Morristown, New Jersey, United States

Sport
- Sport: Rowing
Medal record
Men's rowing
Representing United States
World Rowing Championships
Gold medal – first place	1994 Indianapolis	M8+
Gold medal – first place	1997 Aiguebelette	M1x
Bronze medal – third place	1993 Račice	M8+
Bronze medal – third place	1995 Tampere	M8+
Pan American Games
Gold medal – first place	1995 Mar del Plata	M4-
Gold medal – first place	1995 Mar del Plata	M8+

James W. Koven (born April 18, 1973) is an American rower.

== Career ==
Koven began rowing as a boarding student at St. Paul's School. He continued rowing as a college student at Brown University where he studied mechanical engineering. Koven became a member of the U.S. Rowing team in 1993 and was a member of the team for eight years, retiring after the Sydney Olympics in 2000. As a national team rower Koven won the World Championships in 1994 in the Men's Heavyweight 8+. In 1996 Koven was in the Men's Heavyweight 8+ that finished fifth.

In 1997, Jamie switched from sweep rowing to the single sculls. He trained with Scott Roop, his coach from Brown, and won the World Championships in the Men's Heavyweight 1x in September 1997. In 1997, while hitchhiking to the Paris World Cup II, Koven was picked up by Australian rowers Duncan and Marcus Free along with their coach and father Reg Free. This single event has turned into a 26 year friendship. While Jamie won Gold at that year’s World Championship, The Free Brothers won Bronze in the Double Scull.

In 1998 Koven won the World Cup in Munich and the Diamond Challenge Sculls at the Henley Royal Regatta. At the World Championships in Cologne that summer he had an equipment malfunction in the semifinals; he finished 8th in that regatta. Koven continued to row in the single scull through 1999 but moved back to sweep rowing in 2000, competing in the Men's Four at the Sydney Olympics, finishing 5th place. In 2001 Koven competed in the Men's Four that won at the World Cup at Mercer Lake.

Koven retired from rowing after the Olympics in 2000. In the fall of 2010, Koven came out of retirement and began training with the U.S national team in Chula Vista, California.

Koven married Sophie Coquillette on February 20, 1999. They have four children, Lucy, Annabel, Charlie, and Henry.
