= Stämpfli Racing Boats =

British-based manufacturer of rowing boats

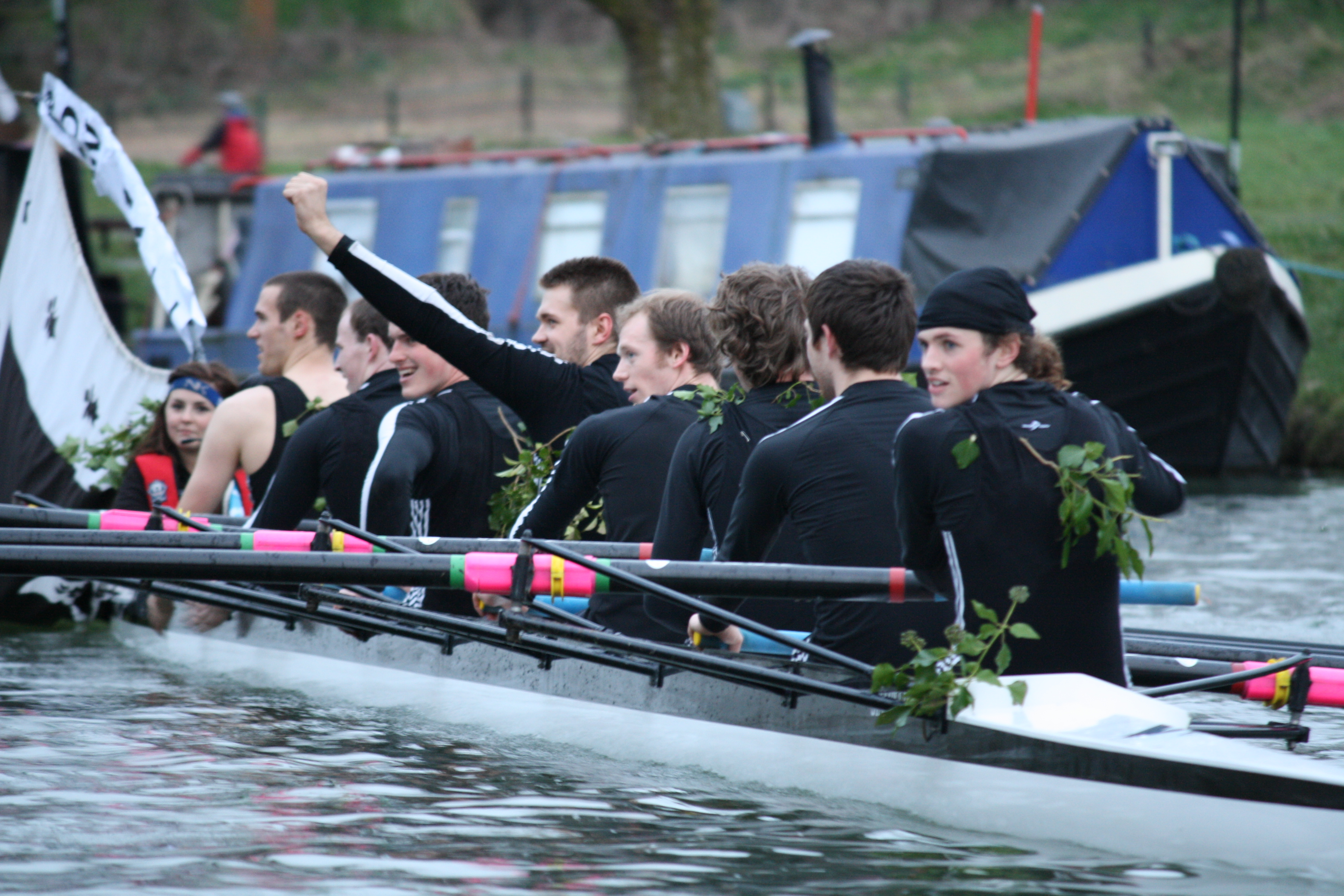
A modern Stampfli eight used by Trinity Hall Boat Club, Cambridge in the 2009 Lent Bumps.

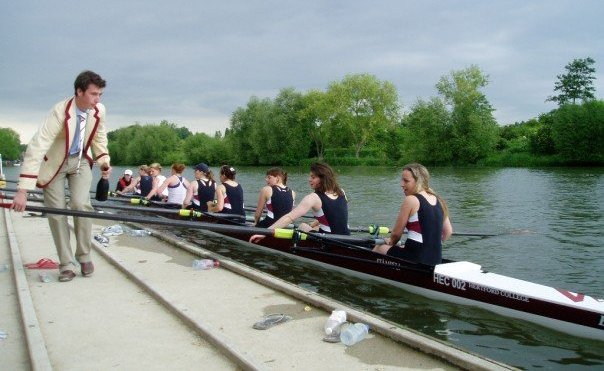
The landing of a Stampfli eight used by Hertford College Boat Club, Oxford

Stämpfli Racing Boats is a British-based manufacturer of rowing boats. Stämpfli was founded in Switzerland by Johann Friedrich August Stämpfli in 1896. Manufacturing originally took place in Zurich, Switzerland, but moved to Surrey, England after the company was acquired by Janousek Racing Boats in 1991. Stämpfli is a subdivision of Janousek boats, Stämpfli produce generally slimmer boats which are more popular amongst competitive rowers at a club level.

== History ==
Stämpfli was founded in 1896 by Johann Friedrich August Stämpfli and is the oldest operating rowing boat manufacturer in the world. The company was originally based in Zurich, Switzerland and started building fishing boats and sailing yachts in Wollishofen on the bank of Lake Zurich. In 1898 the first racing boat was built, a "Yol de Mer" for the See-Club in Zug, Switzerland. This boat was a great success and is now on display in the Museum of Sport in Basel, Switzerland.

Stämpfli was always at the forefront of introducing technology and innovation to racing boats. During the 1950s the company experimented with the design of a U-shaped hull rather than the more common semi-circle shape. This proved to be successful and the rest of the rowing world switched to the new design.

Also at this time the development of the first Aluminium rigger was underway to replace the traditional steel riggers and thus to dramatically reduce the weight of the boats.

Through the next twenty years the company was at the leading edge of the rowing world. Its hand crafted cedar racing shells were exported throughout the world and established Stämpfli as a world leader. At Olympic Games and World Rowing Championship events Stämpfli boats, in the hands of Pertti Karppinen from Finland, probably one of the most successful single scullers in the history of the sport, and others have won time and time again.

In the early 1980s the rowing industry was going through a dramatic change with composite materials slowly finding their place in construction methods. During this period Alfred Stämpfli, the son of Johann Stämpfli retired and handed the company to Melchior Burgin. A successful rower in his own right, (1966 World Champion for Double sculls) Burgin had been a long-time employee of the company and under his leadership the company started to build composite boats alongside the exquisite wooden boats.

Through the 1980s and early 1990s Stämpfli produced the wooden and composite boats side by side.
