= Rowing at the 1950 British Empire Games =

- Venue: Lake Karapiro
- Location: Karapiro, New Zealand
- Dates: 4 – 11 February 1950

Rowing at the 1950 British Empire Games was the third appearance of Rowing at the Commonwealth Games.

Competition featured five events being held at Lake Karapiro, 160 kilometres (99 mi) south of Auckland. Three special trains took 1500 people to Cambridge on 7 February 1950.

Australia topped the rowing medal table with four gold medals.

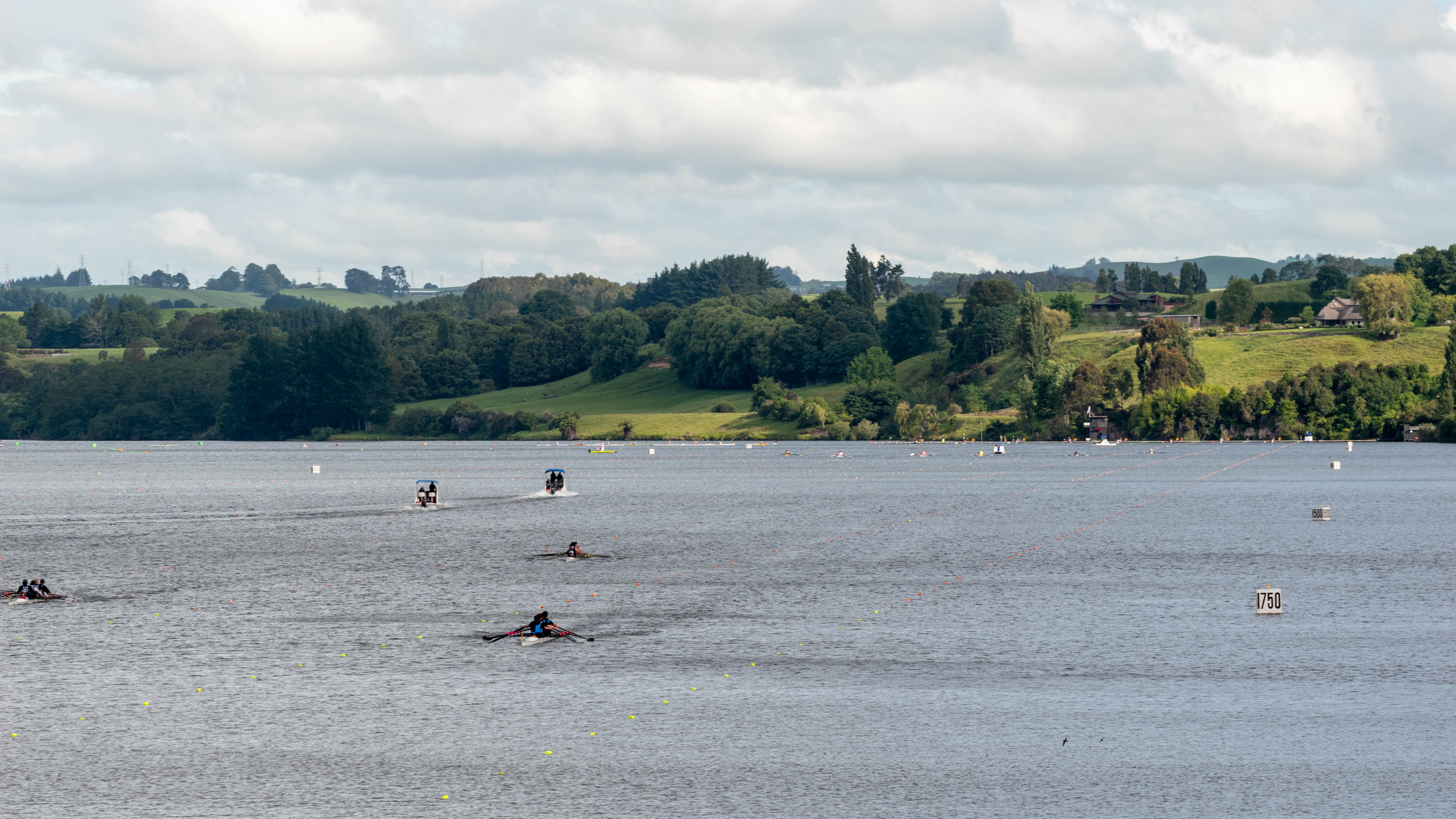
Lake Karapiro

== Medal table ==
* Host nation (New Zealand)

Rank	Nation	Gold	Silver	Bronze	Total
1	Australia (AUS)	4	1	0	5
2	New Zealand (NZL)*	1	3	0	4
3	England (ENG)	0	1	2	3
4	South Africa (RSA)	0	0	1	1
Totals (4 entries)		5	5	3	13

== Medal winners ==
The double sculls competition was an invitation event and originally no medals were awarded but they are counted in the medal table today.

Event	Gold	Silver	Bronze
Single sculls	Australia	England	South Africa
Double sculls	Australia	New Zealand	England
Coxless pair	Australia	New Zealand	none
Coxed four	New Zealand	Australia	none
Eights	Australia	New Zealand	England

== Results ==
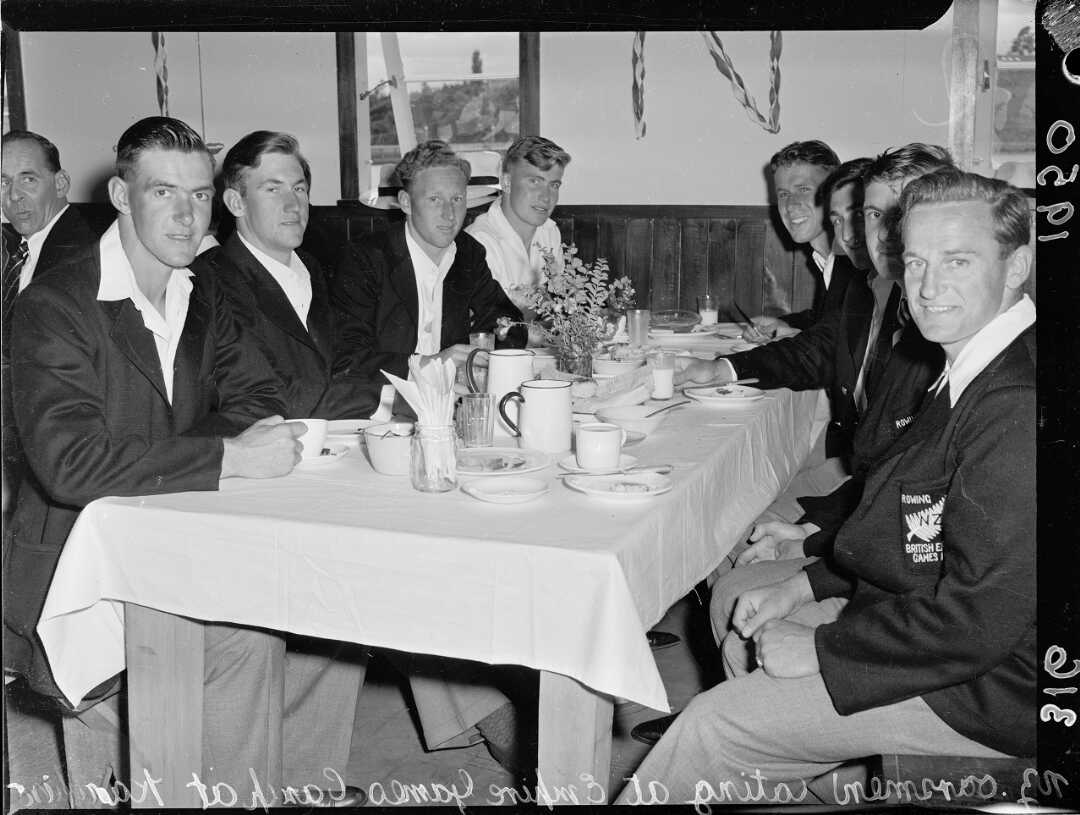
The New Zealand rowing team; from right: E Smith, B Culpan, J W James, W Tinnick, D Simonson, E Johnson, W Carroll, J O'Brien

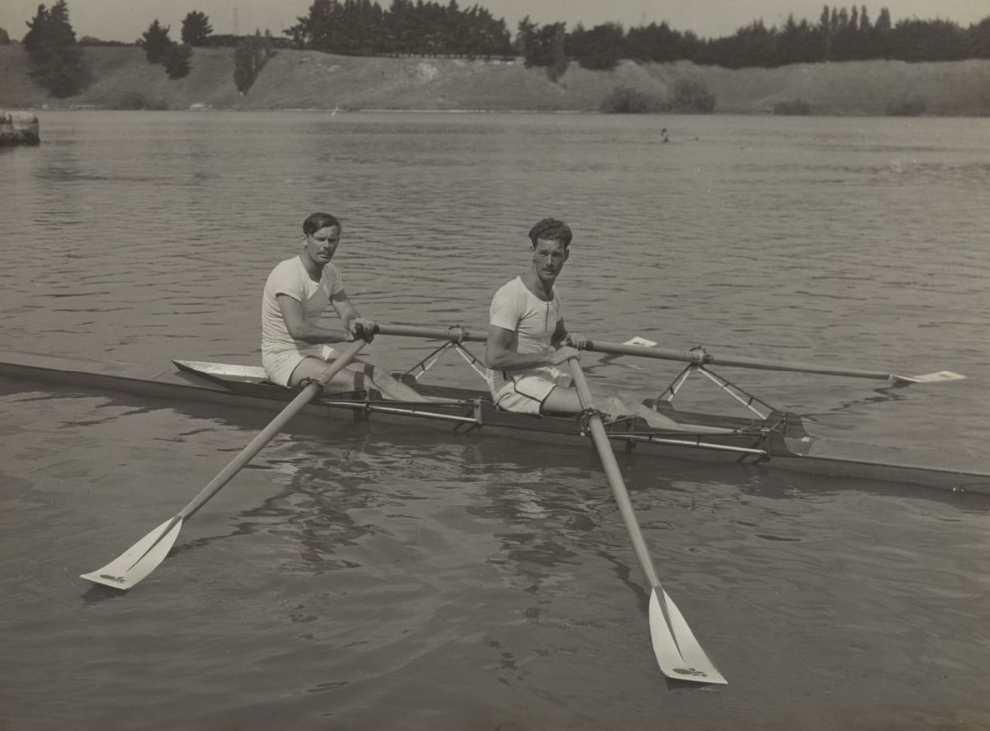
1950 British Empire Games rowing Ken Tinegate (left) and Jack Brown (right) Auckland Libraries Heritage Collections

=== Single sculls ===
Pos	Athlete	Time
1	(Australia) Mervyn Wood	7:46.8
2	(England) Tony Rowe	7:54.0
3	(South Africa) Ian Stephen	8:04.0
4	(New Zealand) Tristan Hegglun	

=== Double sculls ===
- Only three entries

Pos	Athlete	Time
1	(Australia) Mervyn Wood & Murray Riley	7:22
2	(New Zealand) Joe Schneider & Des Simonson	7:32
3	(England) Ken Tinegate & Jack Brown	7:39

=== Coxless pair ===
- Only two entries

Pos	Athlete	Time
1	(Australia) Wal Lambert & Jack Webster	7:58
2	(New Zealand) David Gould & Humphrey Gould	8:10

=== Coxed four ===
- Only two entries

Pos	Athlete	Time
1	(New Zealand) Ted Johnson, John O'Brien, Bill James, Bill Carroll, Colin Johnstone (cox)	7:17.2
2	(Australia) Leslie Montgomery, Erwin Elder, Cecil Winkworth, Kenneth Gee, Kevin Fox (cox)	7:24.0

=== Eights ===
- Only three entries

Pos	Athlete	Time
1	(Australia) Alan Brown, Bruce Goswell, Edward Pain, Eric Longley, Peter Holmes a Court, Phil Cayzer, Bob Tinning, Ross Selman, James Barnes (cox)	6:27
2	(New Zealand) Bruce Culpan, Don Rowlands, Edwin Smith, Grahame Jarratt, Kerry Ashby, Murray Ashby, Thomas Engel, William Tinnock, Don Adam (cox)	6:27.5
3	(England) Tony Butcher, Hank Rushmere, Michael Lapage, Patrick Bradley, Peter de Giles, Peter Kirkpatrick, Dickie Burnell, William Windham, Jack Dearlove (cox)	6:40

== Sources ==
- Churchman, Geoffrey B; Hurst, Tony (2001) [1990, 1991]. The Railways of New Zealand: A Journey through History (Second ed.). Transpress New Zealand. ISBN 0-908876-20-3.
