= Patrick Bradley (rower) =

English rower

Personal information
- Nationality: British (English)

Sport
- Sport: Rowing
- Club: Leander Club
Medal record
Rowing
Representing England
British Empire Games
| Bronze medal – third place | 1950 Auckland | Eights |

Patrick Bradley was a male rower who competed for England.

== Biography ==
Bradley was part of the Leander Club crew that won the 1949 Grand Challenge Cup at the Henley Royal Regatta.

Bradley represented the English team at the 1950 British Empire Games in Auckland, New Zealand, where he won the bronze medal in the eights event.

In 1951, Bradley teamed up with Dickie Burnell to win the Double Sculls Challenge Cup at Henley.
