= Martin Studach =

Swiss rower

Personal information
- Born: Martin Andreas Studach; 17 May 1944 Küsnacht
- Died: 24 March 2007 (aged 62) Zürich

Sport
- Sport: Rowing
- Club: Grasshopper Club Zürich
Medal record
Men's rowing
Representing Switzerland
World Rowing Championships
Gold medal – first place	1966 Bled	Double sculls
European Rowing Championships
Bronze medal – third place	1964 Amsterdam	Double sculls
Gold medal – first place	1965 Duisburg	Double sculls
Gold medal – first place	1967 Vichy	Double sculls

Martin Andreas Studach (17 May 1944 – 24 March 2007) was a Swiss rower who competed in the 1964 Summer Olympics and the 1968 Summer Olympics.

== Biography ==
Studach was born in Küsnacht, Zurich, the son of Eugen Studach who had been a champion single sculler in the 1930s and 1940s. He rowed for Grasshopper Club, Zurich.

Studach partnered Melchior Bürgin in the Double scull rowing for Switzerland at the 1964 Summer Olympics in Tokyo when they came fourth. At the age of 20, Studach was Switzerland's youngest competitor. Over next three years, Studach and Burgin dominated the double sculls scene. In 1965 they won the Double Sculls Challenge Cup at Henley Royal Regatta. and the European Championships.

In 1966 they won the World Championships. They won the European Championships and the Double Sculls at Henley again in 1967, and Studach also won the Diamond Challenge Sculls (the premier singles sculls event) at the Henley Royal Regatta, beating Jochen Meißner in the final that year. Studach had a reputation for driving himself hard. Studach and Burgin rowed in the Double Scull again for Switzerland at the 1968 Summer Olympics, but at the altitude in Mexico Studach suffered a collapse through over-exertion in the heats.

Studach died of a heart attack at the age of 62 after finishing an outing in a double scull in Zürich, Switzerland.
