= Janousek Racing Boats =

Janousek Racing Boats Ltd is a British-based manufacturer of rowing boats / racing shells established in 1981 by Bohumil Janoušek, a Czech rower and Olympic double bronze medallist.

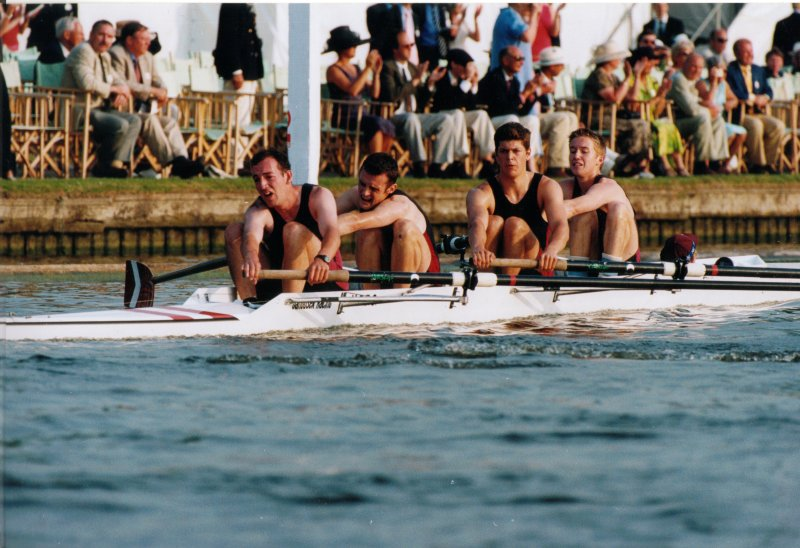
A Janousek coxed four used by University College Boat Club at Henley Royal Regatta 2001.

The boats are made of a honeycomb-sandwich laminate that is heat-cured at high temperatures, producing stronger shells than the more traditional cold-curing method of construction. Janousek was one of the first rowing boat makers in the world to offer this method of rowing boat construction. Janousek manufacture singles, doubles, coxless pairs, coxless fours and quads (in one of three hull shapes), bow and stern-coxed fours and quads (in one of two hull shapes), and sectional eights. They offer a wide range of boats designed for different average crew weights.

Janousek boats are a very popular choice of club boat in Britain due to their relatively low price and the company's high production capacity, they are also more durable compared with other makes of racing shells.

The Janousek company also owns Stämpfli Racing Boats, another manufacturer of rowing boats which was acquired in 1991.

Janousek boats have been used at all levels of competition including World Rowing Championships with the British men's heavyweight coxed four using a Janousek in the 1983 World Rowing Championships and Italy using one for their lightweight coxless four Gold medal winning crew of 1982.
