= Birmingham Rowing Club =

British rowing club

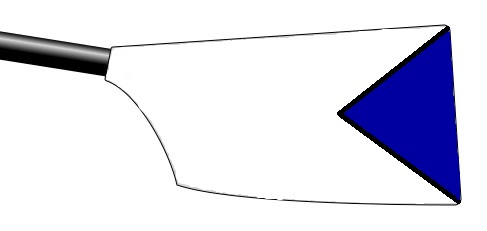
- Location: Birmingham, England
- Home water: Edgbaston Reservoir
- Founded: 1873
- Key people: Peter Veitch (President)
- Affiliations: British Rowing boat code - BIR
- Website: www.birminghamrowingclub.co.uk

Events
- Birmingham Regatta

Notable members
- George Justicz; Graham Beech; Ken Tinegate

Birmingham Rowing Club is an amateur rowing club, based at Birmingham, England. It is situated on Edgbaston Reservoir in the centre of Birmingham. The club was founded in 1873 although there is reference to a 'Birmingham Soho Club' using the reservoir earlier in 1859.

The club, which serves Birmingham is a rowing club for men, women, adults, juniors and veterans. It is affiliated to British Rowing.

== History ==
The club's earliest win at Henley Royal Regatta was the Wyfold Challenge Cup in 1904. The crew consisted of S. E. Alldridge, J. W. Frame, F. A. G. Medd and A. H. Cloutte.

A dearth of further successes was ended with appearance in the finals of the Doubles in the 1950s by Ken Tinegate and Graham Beech, and then wins in 1960 and 1961 by George Justicz.

In 2015 Peter Veitch became the club's president after being elected at the AGM in 2015 following the death of Sir Adrian Cadbury.

== Honours ==
=== Henley Royal Regatta ===
Year	Races won
1904	Wyfold Challenge Cup
1960	Double Sculls Challenge Cup
1961	Double Sculls Challenge Cup

=== British champions ===
Year	Winning crew/s
1984	Women 2x
1985	Women 1x
1990	Women 2-

== Notable rowers ==
- S. E. Alldridge
- Graham Beech
- A. H. Cloutte
- J. W. Frame
- George Justicz
- F. A. G. Medd
- Ken Tinegate
- Helen Bruce
- Rhian Davies
- Sheena Groves
- Diane Horrocks
- Maggie Jameson
- Audrey Wedderburn
- Sue Welch
