= Edna Child =

British diver (1922–2023)

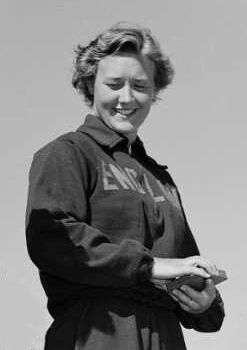
- Edna Child at the 1950 British Empire Games

Personal information
- Born: 16 October 1922 West Ham, Essex, England
- Died: 20 May 2023 (aged 100) Essex, England
- Spouses: Norman Andrew Tym (m. 1949; div. 1954) Kenneth William Tinegate (m. 1954; died 1958)

Sport
- Sport: Diving
- Club: Plaistow United Swimming Club
Medal record
Representing United Kingdom
European Championships
Bronze medal – third place	1938 London	Springboard
Representing England
British Empire Games
Gold medal – first place	1950 Auckland	Springboard
Gold medal – first place	1950 Auckland	Platform

Edna Lilian Child (later Tyn and Tinegate; 16 October 1922 – 20 May 2023) was a British diver. Competing in the 3 metre springboard she won a gold medal at the 1950 British Empire Games and a bronze at the 1938 European Championships and finished sixth at the 1948 Summer Olympics. At the 1950 British Empire Games she also won a gold medal in the 10 metre platform. Her husband Ken Tinegate competed in rowing at those Games.

== Early life ==
At an early age, Child was diagnosed with empyema and spent much of her childhood undergoing operations. Following one serious operation, she was thereafter advised to be careful not to over-exert herself. Although she started swimming at the age of seven, her real passion was diving. By July 1937 and under the coaching of Reginald Laxton, she was the springboard champion of the Southern Counties and Essex Ladies, having only been diving for around two years.

== Career ==
Child won two gold medals at the 1950 British Empire Games, a bronze at the 1938 European Championships and finished sixth at the 1948 Summer Olympics. In July 1938, she was invited to represent England at the European swimming championships by the Amateur Swimming Association. By 1948, she was also a school teacher.

While training for the 1950 British Empire Games, Child injured herself while doing a somersault on a new trampoline at the Highgate Diving Club, having misjudged the additional height compared to an Olympic regulation springboard. Despite dislocating her instep bone, her coach bandaged it up and she returned to training. At this time, she was described as being a "triple English diving champion". In the 1950 British Empire Games, Child became the first English competitor to gain a "double", having one gold medals in each of the two diving events she competed in.

In February 1950, she announced her retirement from competitive diving, stating that she "shall go back to being a housewife" and that it was likely she would emigrate to Canada with her husband. She announced her plans to emigrate in April 1950, having turned down "a very tempting offer" of £1000 to remain in England as a professional, undertaking a diving tour of Great Britain over five months. In August 1951, she gave a diving display at the North Wales swimming and diving championships, an annual event that was held in the Bay of Colwyn Swimming Pool.

== Later life ==
In February 2013, her house was burgled and her two gold medals from the British Empire Games were stolen, along with a laptop and jewellery. Child had been running errands when she returned home to find it ransacked and the medals taken, which she planned to pass on to her daughters.

In 2016 at the age of 94, she helped to promote the European Aquatics Championships when they returned to London for the first time since 1938, when she won a bronze medal. Commenting on the failure of German women in not winning any gold medals at the event, Child noted that it was "the best feeling", while noting that athletes in her day had less superior facilities and believed that sport was "purer".

== Personal life ==
Edna Lilian Child was the daughter of Mr. S. W. Child, who was reported in 1922 to be the superintendent of Romford Baths. She married architect Norman Andrew Tym on 16 April 1949 at Romford Parish Church. The couple announced in April 1950 that they planned to emigrate to Canada, leaving their home in Shepperton. In May 1954, she was granted a decree nisi in the divorce courts from Tym on the grounds of desertion, suggesting he had "behaved most unreasonably"; the suit was not contested.

On 16 October 1954, she married Kenneth William Tinegate, a sculler, in Droitwich. The couple met on the boat when sailing back home after the 1950 British Empire Games. They spent their honeymoon in Italy and went on to have two daughters. Kenneth died just under four years later in July 1958 at Bromsgrove, leaving an estate worth just under £6,300 to Child.

Edna Child Tinegate lived in retirement in Gidea Park, Romford, Essex and in 2022 celebrated her 100th birthday – the first British aquatic Olympian to achieve the milestone. She died on 20 May 2023, at the age of 100.
