= Peter Kirkpatrick =

British rower

Personal information
- Nationality: British (English)
- Born: 24 August 1916 Brentford, England
- Died: 6 October 1995 (aged 79) Westminster, England

Sport
- Sport: Rowing
- Club: Thames Rowing Club
Medal record
Rowing
Representing England
British Empire Games
| Bronze medal – third place | 1950 Auckland | Eights |

Peter Crichton Kirkpatrick (24 August 1916 – 6 October 1995) was a British rower who competed at the 1948 Summer Olympics.

== Biography ==
Kirkpatrick rowed for the Thames Rowing Club.

At the 1948 Olympic Games in London he competed in the men's coxless four event.

He represented the English team at the 1950 British Empire Games in Auckland, New Zealand, where he won the bronze medal in the eights event.
