= Hank Rushmere =

British rower (1913–2002)

Personal information
- Nationality: British (English)
- Born: 27 April 1913 Great Yarmouth, England
- Died: 5 May 2002 (aged 89) Bromyard, England

Sport
- Sport: Rowing
- Club: Thames Rowing Club
Medal record
Rowing
Representing England
British Empire Games
Bronze medal – third place	1950 Auckland	Eights

Hedley William "Hank" Rushmere (27 April 1913 – 5 May 2002) was a British rower.

== Biography ==
Rushmere competed in the men's coxless four event at the 1948 Summer Olympics.

He represented the English team at the 1950 British Empire Games in Auckland, New Zealand, where he won the bronze medal in the eights event.

Rushmere died in Bromyard on 5 May 2002, at the age of 89.
