= Bristol Ariel Rowing Club =

British rowing club

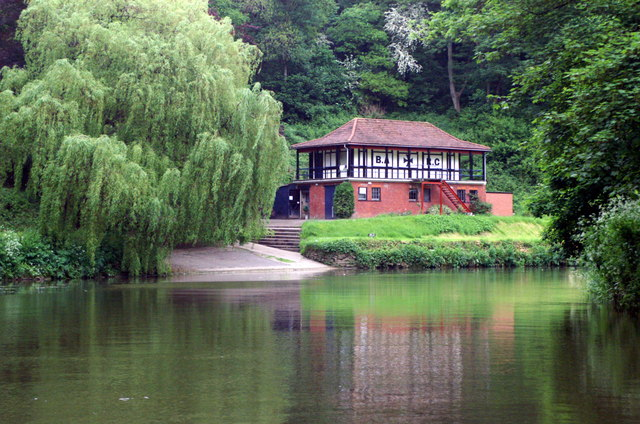

- Motto: Vis unita fortior
- Location: St Annes, Bristol
- Home water: River Avon
- Founded: 1870
- Affiliations: British Rowing (boat code BRA)
- Website: www.bristolarielrowingclub.co.uk

Events
- Bristol Ariel Head

Notable members
- Nicholas Birkmyre

Bristol Ariel Rowing Club, founded in 1870, is the oldest rowing club in Bristol. It is located at St Annes, Bristol and has access to 6 kilometres (3.7 mi) of the River Avon. The club was named after its original boathouse, an old French frigate moored near Bristol Bridge. All the club's rowing boats were named along the same theme, after characters from The Tempest. The club moved to the clubhouse at St Annes in 1900, and although they suffered losses and closed during the two World Wars, it has expanded since.

== Club colours ==
The blade colours are white set with an Oxford blue Maltese cross; kit: white, trimmed with Oxford blue.

== History ==
The Bristol Ariel Rowing Club was formed in 1870, making it the oldest club of its kind in Bristol. The club originally stored its equipment in an old French frigate near Bristol Bridge, named Ariel, after which rowing club was named. Each of the club's boats have followed the same theme by being named after character's from William Shakespeare's The Tempest, as story with a character called Ariel. The frigate was known as "the barge", and housed all the club's boats and paperwork, as well as having space for the rowers to change in. By 1879, the club had approximately 60 active and 100 honorary members and in 1884 the club won the West of England Challenge Cup.

In 1900, the club moved to a new clubhouse at St Annes, Bristol, where it remains. It was officially opened by Frederick Wills, using a key which was specially designed for the occasion. The building was designed by J. Hart Taylor. The club lost thirteen members who were killed in action during World War I, leaving the club closed until 1919. The club opened to lady members in 1926, originally only as tennis members. On 6 December 1940, the grounds were hit by a bomb during World War II, destroying the teahouse and damaging the main club house, leaving the club closed again until it could be repaired after the war. In 1955, the University of West of England built eight sheds for their boats and a large boathouse was added for the club in 1971.

== Honours ==
=== Henley Royal Regatta ===
Year	Races won
1960	Double Sculls Challenge Cup
1961	Double Sculls Challenge Cup
