= Jack Brown (rower) =

English rower (1920–2001)

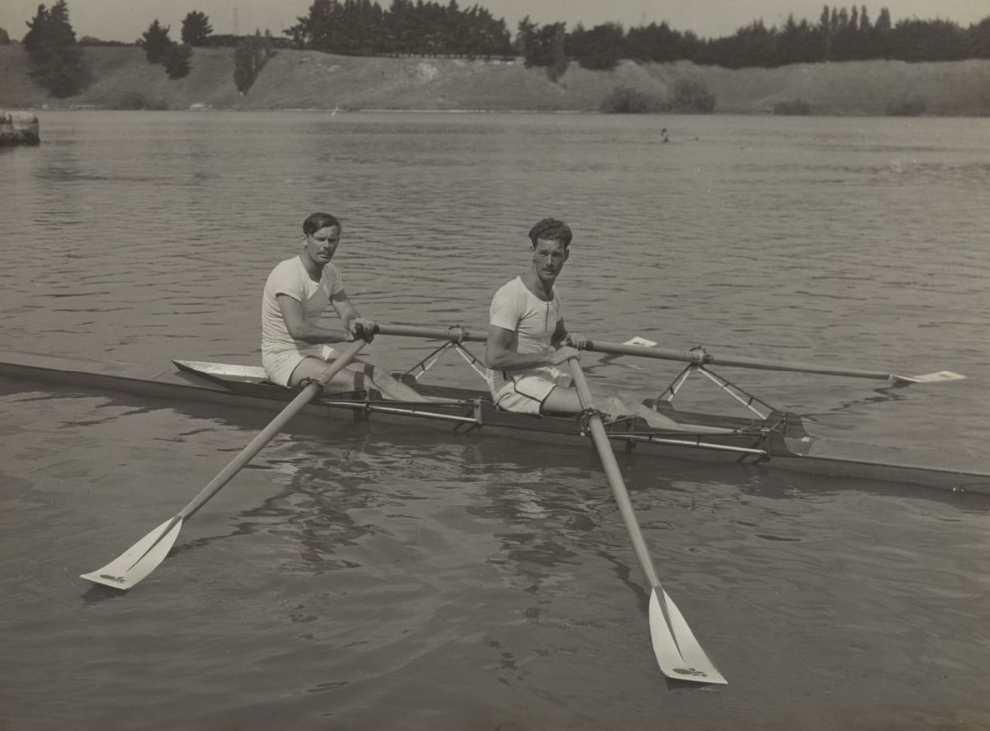
- 1950 British Empire Games, Tinegate (left) and Brown (right); Auckland Libraries Heritage Collections

Personal information
- Nationality: British (English)
- Born: 13 August 1920
- Died: 2001 (aged 80)

Sport
- Sport: Rowing
- Club: Loughborough BC
Medal record
Rowing
Representing England
British Empire Games
Bronze medal – third place	1950 Auckland	Double sculls

John Brown (13 August 1920 – 2001), also known as Jack Brown or Boris Brown, was a rower who competed for England.

== Rowing career ==
Brown represented England and won a bronze medal in the double sculls with Ken Tinegate at the 1950 British Empire Games in Auckland, New Zealand. Shortly before the Games the pair had to purchase a new boat after their previous one had been badly damaged by a submerged tree during training in Southport.

Brown, along with his double sculls rowing partner Ken Tinegate, were twice runner-up of the Double Sculls Challenge Cup at the Henley Royal Regatta, behind Danes Ebbe Parsner and Aage Larsen.

== Personal life and death ==
Brown was born on 13 August 1920. During the Games in 1950, he lived at Hume House, Sparrow Hill, Loughborough. He was a company director and was a member of the Loughborough Boat Club.

Brown was the son of Owen Alfred Brown (1882–1954). Following his father's death, Jack took over his father's business, alongside his brothers Owen and William. He married Catherine Williams in 1950. Brown died in 2001, at the age of 80.
