= Marlow Rowing Club =

British rowing club

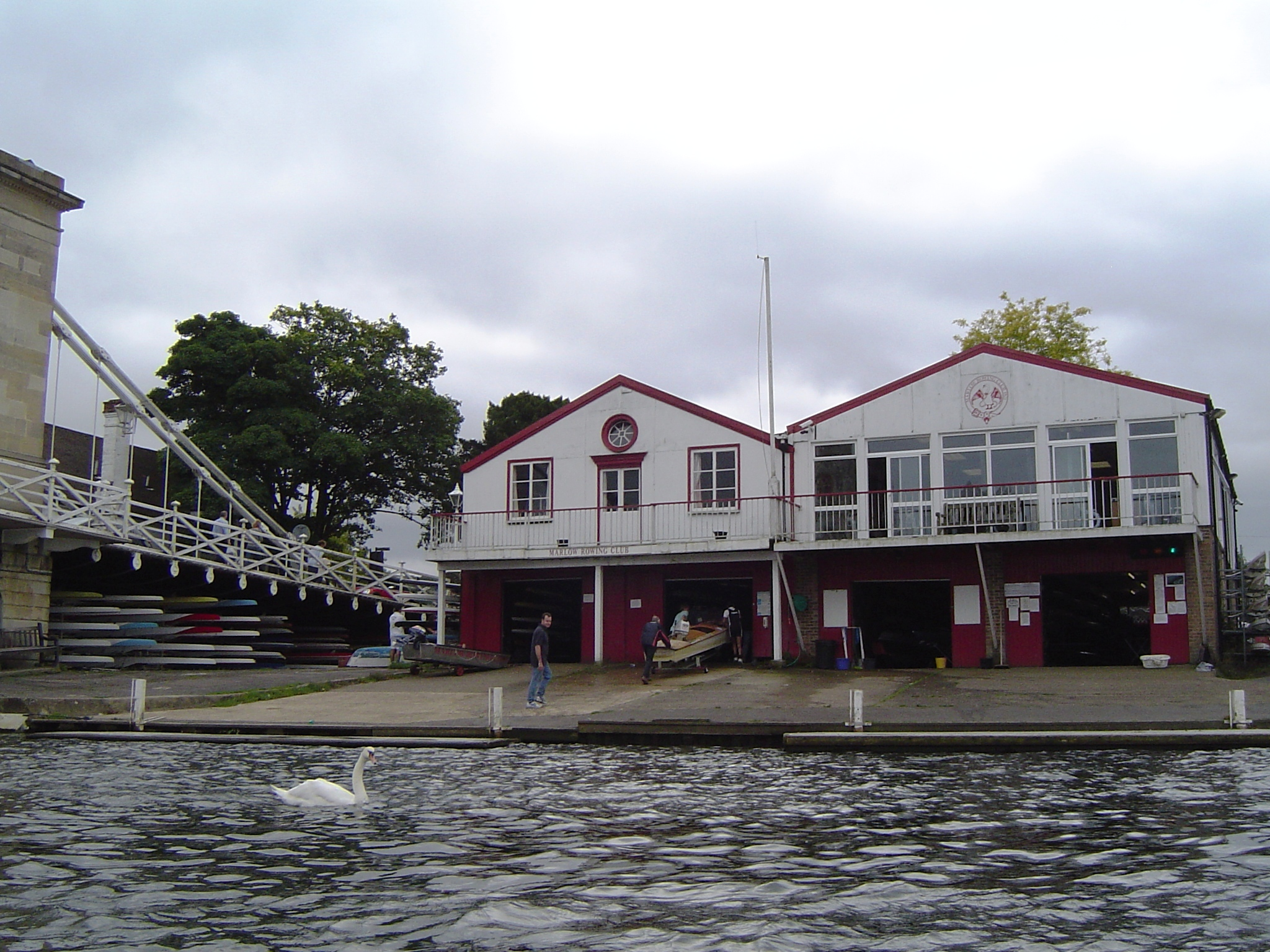

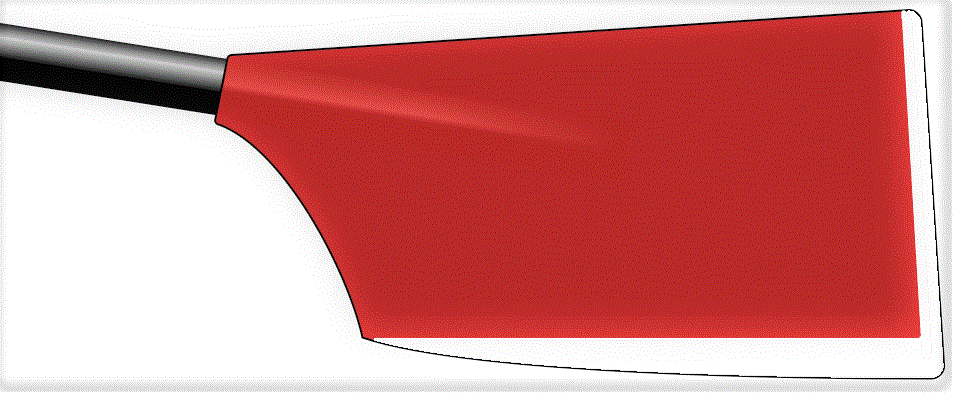
- Location: Marlow, Buckinghamshire, England
- Coordinates: 51°34′00″N 0°46′24″W
- Home water: Marlow Lock
- Founded: 1871
- Membership: Open
- Affiliations: British Rowing boat code - MAR
- Website: www.marlowrowingclub.org.uk

Events
- Marlow Regatta, Marlow Town Regatta, Marlow Spring Regatta, Marlow Long Distance Sculls, FirstRow Challenge, Rowers' Revenge Triathlon

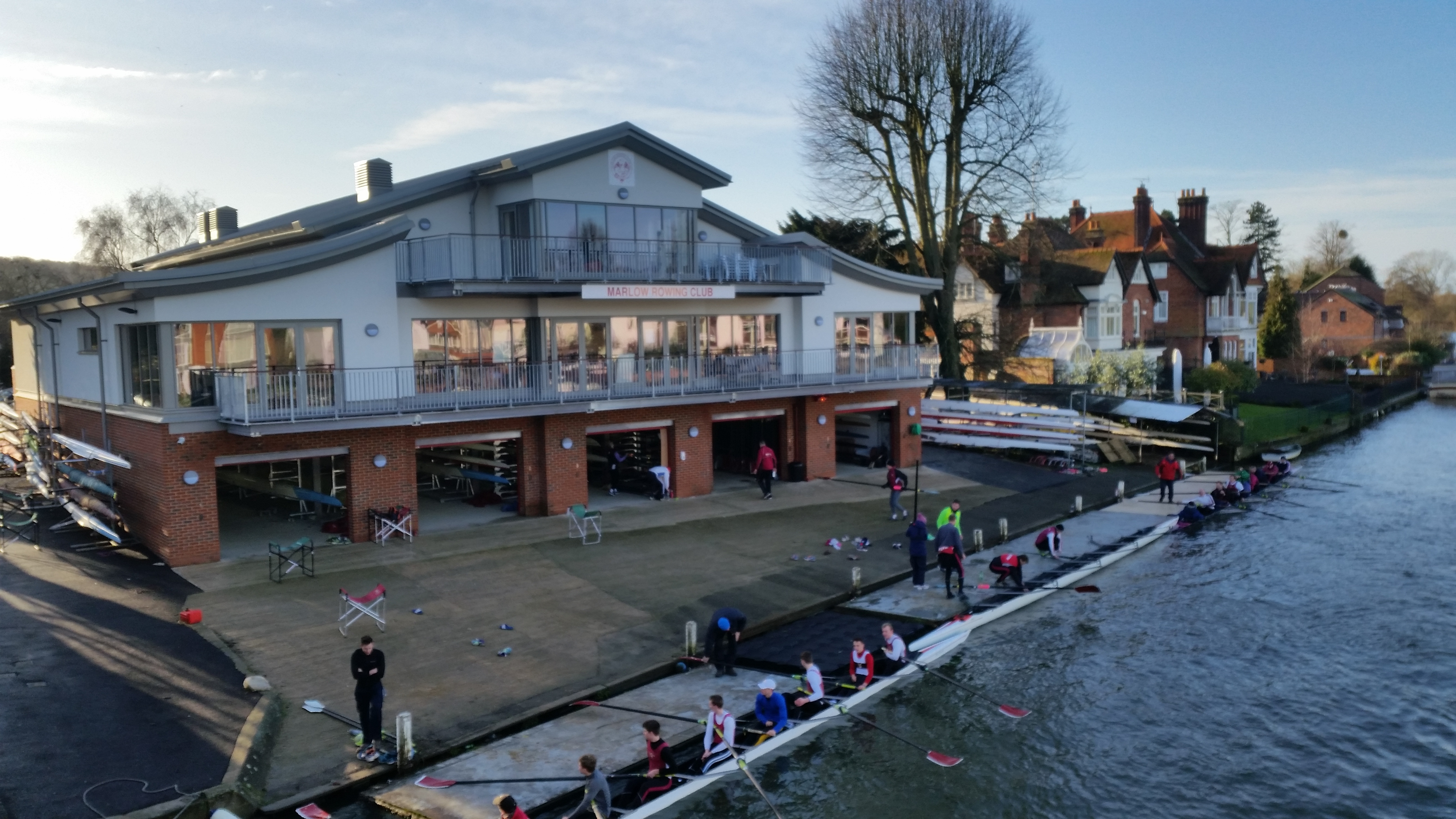
Rebuilt Marlow Rowing Club 2015

Marlow Rowing Club is a rowing club on the River Thames in England, on the southern bank of the Thames at Bisham in Berkshire, opposite the town of Marlow, Buckinghamshire just beside Marlow Bridge and on the reach above Marlow Lock. Founded in 1871, it is one of the main rowing and sculling centres in England. Members of the club have represented Great Britain in the Olympic Games and World Championships.

== History ==
The local football club Marlow F.C. was founded at a dinner at Compleat Angler Hotel in 1870. At a football club dinner at the Angler, members decided that what the town needed next was a rowing club, and further meetings were held to found one, which happened on 16 May 1871. Rowing was already established in the town, and the Marlow Regatta, a separate organisation to the rowing club, had been running since around 1855. Initially the club had no home and rowers sheltered under Marlow Bridge on the Buckinghamshire side, but when the freeholder died in 1888 they had to move to Meakes and Redknap boathouse on the other side of the river. In 1892 Edward Riley offered to allow the use of his land just above the Meakes boathouse, by 1896 Mr Wethered, the club captain (from the local brewery family) obtained a lease from Mr Ward, a life tenant of the site that the club now occupies. The clubhouse was complete in 1896 and formally opened in 1897. Ward died 10 years later, but the new owner, Mr Borgnis, granted a new lease the club remained a tenant of sympathetic landlords until it acquired the freehold following the 2011 fire. The neighbouring land was acquired from Sir James Boyton (who still has a boat named after him).

During the early years of the club, the Town Challenge Cup at Henley Royal Regatta was a trophy that many of the Upper Thames clubs wanted, and Marlow entered every year from 1871 (except 1879) until it was withdrawn in 1883, and it won 6 times. The club competed at many local regattas.

During the World War I the club lost many members to the war including most of the first eight which had won at many local regattas, and played host to disabled servicemen and a guards regiment which had been garrisoned nearby.

Marlow first competed in the Head of the River Race in 1932, and lost further members in World War II.

By the 1950s the club was strong, with Mike Spracklen, later an internationally famous coach, as captain in 1959. The club had reached the finals of the Wyfolds in 1954, and in 1959 it won 20 trophies. In 1958 Mike Spracklen and Geoff Baker had won gold medals in the Empire Games 2x event.

By the 1960s and 1970s the club was small in numbers, but in 1978 a local junior, Steve Redgrave started his career with the club. With Steve the club won its first Henley trophy in a long time when 1981 Steve and Eric Sims won the 2x event, which he repeated with Adam Clift. Redgrave won many other trophies at Henley and went on to be the UK's most successful rowing Olympian. He is now club president of Marlow Rowing Club and Chairman of Henley Royal Regatta. Mike Spracklen set up the GB training centre at Leander Club, but that catered for men only. The women's rowing set-up was based at Longridge and Marlow offered a home to the first tier of women's rowing. This led the club to have an exceptional women's presence in the late 1980s and 1990s: Gillian Lindsay won the (2x) World Championships in 1998, Alex Beever, Lisa Eyre and Sue Walker were World Champions in the 4- and bronze medallists in the 8o, Cath Bishop was British and World record holder, silver medallist in the 2- in 1997 and won the Paris world Cup in 1998. Twelve athletes from MRC prepared for the Sydney Olympics. The late 1990s also saw the early stages of the careers of Sarah Winckless and Katherine Grainger, both club members who went on to World and Olympic medals. Ann Redgrave was MRC's first female captain in 1989, as well as being an Olympic rower in her own right. As women's rowing has been fully integrated into the British Rowing system Marlow has lost this stream of highly talented women.

However, with Adaptive (Pararowing) on the rise Marlow had a Paralympian in the form of Naomi Riches and now has other pararowers as members as part of the national development scheme.

The club now has a strong junior section, with around 500 members aged 11 to 90.

== Fire and rebuild ==
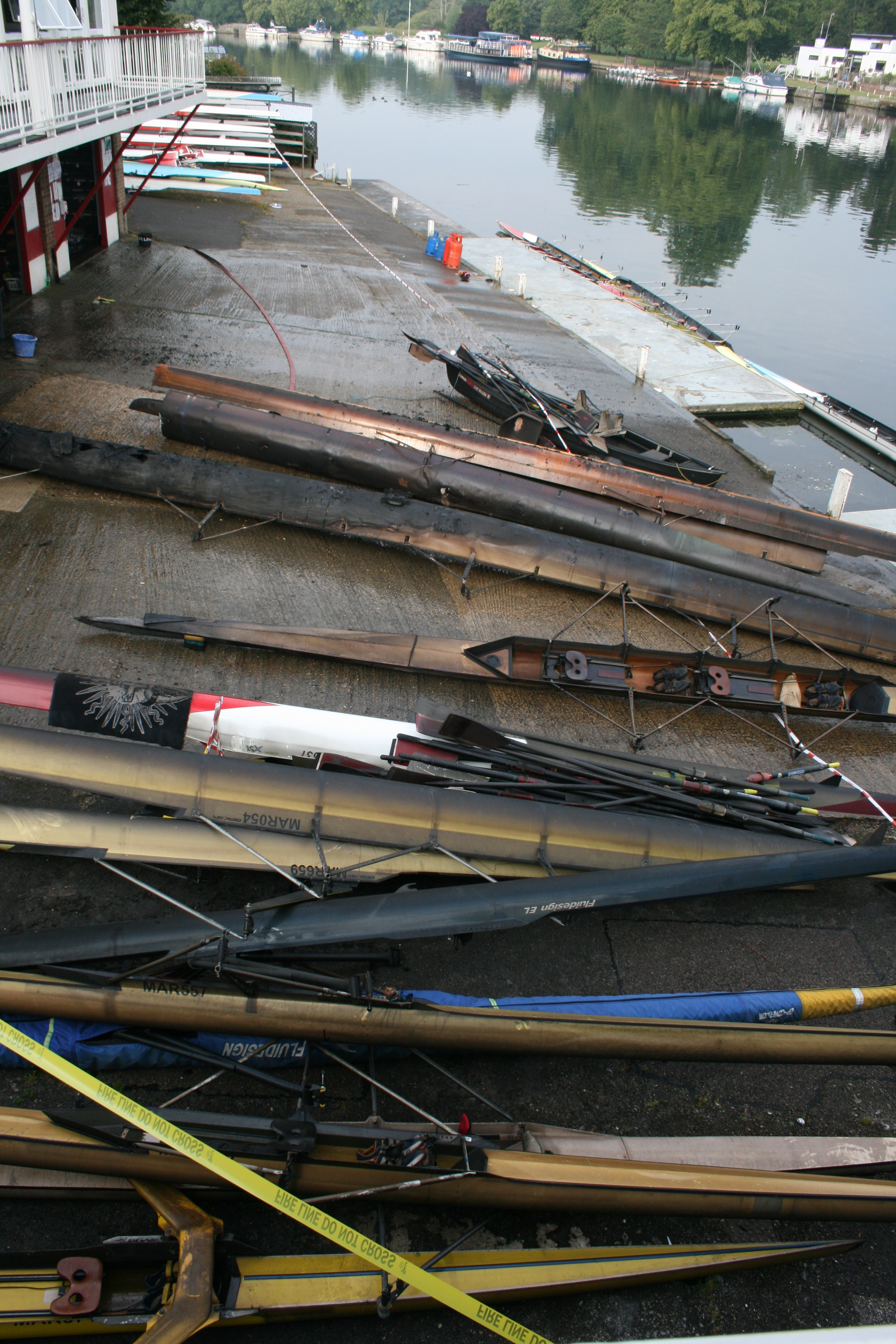
Fire-damaged boats at MRC following the fire in 2011

The club was seriously damaged by a fire on 3 August 2011. The 1896 building was damaged beyond the repair and the 1970s building warped by heat. The decision was taken to demolish and start again. The club operated out of the 1970s building, and at temporary gyms first in a tent at Bisham Abbey and near Marlow railway station, and boating sites at Marlow Sailing Club, Bisham Abbey, the Compleat Angler Hotel, Longridge Activity Centre, Cookham Reach Sailing club and Westhorpe watersports centre.

Disruption to rowing was kept to a minimum and the junior section won the National Schools Championship, the British Championships and the National Sculling Head in 2012, with the coaching team winning a national award.

Following fundraising and a grant of £1million from Sport England the club reached a fundraising target of around £2.6 million and was substantially rebuilt expanding from four boat bays to five, doubling the gym space and with a third floor bar facility.

The club itself has converted into a registered charity (it was previously a Community Amateur Sports Club) and it has been selected as a British Rowing hub for the para-rowing element of the Elite Talent Development Pathway.

The new clubhouse was opened by club president Steve Redgrave and international coach and MRC member Mike Spracklen in September 2015, at an event attended by local MP (and later PM) Theresa May.

== River ==
The club rows from Marlow up to Temple Lock (approximately 2 km), and from below Marlow Lock down to Cookham (approximately 5 km). The former stretch is the home of Marlow Town Regatta, Marlow Spring Regatta and FirstRow Challenge, and the latter the setting for Marlow Long Distance Sculls and the (discontinued) Marlow Fours and Pairs. The Marlow Regatta moved to Dorney Lake in 2001.

Off the water the club also runs the "Rower's Revenge" Triathlon which consists of rowing machines, cycling and running and was held in October each year for around 15 years. It was then transferred to an events company but from 2016 returned to the rowing club and moved to August. From 2017 it will contain an event for disabled athletes, comprising 4 km on a rowing machine (as per the general event), plus 15 km hand cycle and 1.5 km wheelchair race.

== Colours ==
The club colour is cardinal.

The colour scheme was chosen early in the club's history with the club's 1884 rules declaring simply as rule 7 "The Colour of the club shall be cardinal". Bylaw 1 provided more detail: "It shall be compulsory for Members rowing in Regattas or Matches to wear the Club uniform, as follows - Jacket: Dark Blue, Swan worked in Cardinal on breast pocket, Cap - Dark Blue, swan worked in Cardinal on front, Staw Hat, Dark blue ribbon, swan worked in cardinal on front, Jersey - White, trimmed cardinal. Members who have been selected to row in regattas shall, and members who have rowed in regattas may, have their coats trimmed in cardinal."

This colour scheme has largely survived, with modern all-in-ones are maroon with a white stripe down the side and the club crest on the front. Shirts are white with a maroon stripe on the arm and the word "Marlow" picked out in white lettering. Leggings are black with a maroon stripe down the side. The colour scheme is not dissimilar to that of Vesta Rowing Club or Oxford Brookes University.

Club blazers come in two forms - original blue as described, and a white variant. There are photos of members in the 19th century wearing the white version.

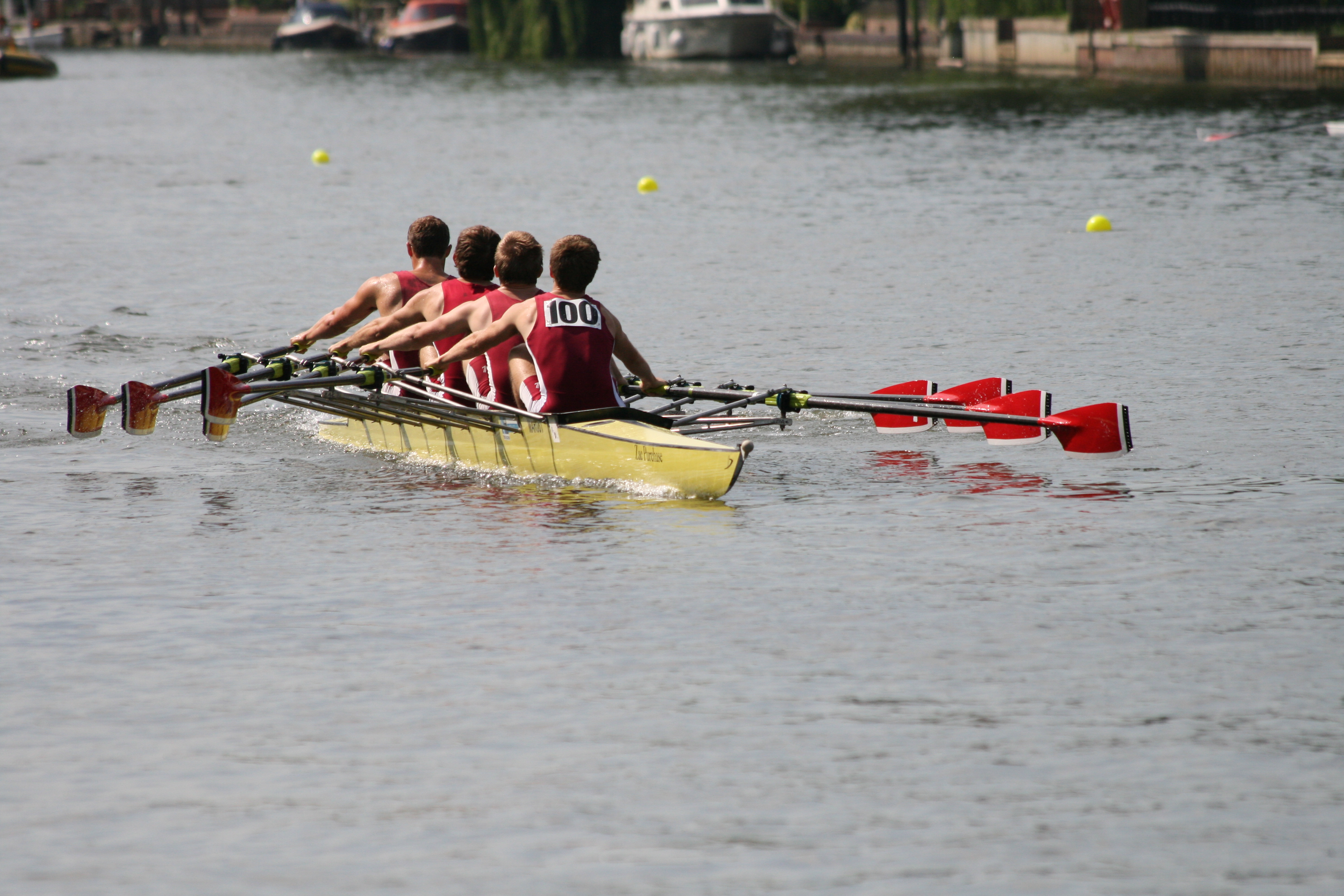
Marlow Rowing Club Quad showing blade and kit colour

== Relationships with other clubs and organisations ==
Marlow Rowing Club's building is also used by Marlow Canoe Club, Longridge Canoe Club, Henley Open Water Swimming Club and a local triathlon club. It was previously a base for local schools but they moved to Longridge.

The bar is run by a trading company owned by the rowing club (which is a charity) and is open to the public on a limited basis.

The club is a base for the British Rowing talent development pathway for Adaptive rowing (or Pararowing) and many members of the BR Para squad are members.

During the annual Swan Upping on the Thames, the Swan Uppers leave their boats at Marlow RC overnight.

The club is twinned with Rowing Club de Port Marly, in France which is the rowing club in Marly-le-Roi that Marlow, Buckinghamshire is twinned with.

== Honours ==
=== Recent British champions ===
Year	Winning crew/s
2011	Open J16 4x, Women J14 4x+
2012	Open J18 4x, Open J16 4x, Women J16 4x, Women J15 4x+
2013	Women J16 4x
2016	Women J16 4+
2017	Open J16 4+, Women J14 4x
2018	Women J15 2x, Women J15 4x+
2019	Women J16 2-, Women J16 4+
2021	OJ15 2x, WJ18 4-
2024	Women J18 4x-
2025	Women J18 8+, Women J16 2x

=== Henley Royal Regatta ===
Year	Races won
1872	Town Challenge Cup
1874	Town Challenge Cup
1875	Town Challenge Cup
1876	Town Challenge Cup
1877	Town Challenge Cup
1883	Town Challenge Cup
1981	Double Sculls Challenge Cup
1982	Queen Mother Challenge Cup, Double Sculls Challenge Cup
1983	Diamond Challenge Sculls
1984	Prince Philip Challenge Cup
1985	Diamond Challenge Sculls
1986	Silver Goblets & Nickalls' Challenge Cup
1987	Silver Goblets & Nickalls' Challenge Cup
2003	Fawley Challenge Cup
2004	Fawley Challenge Cup
2006	Princess Grace Challenge Cup
2013	Fawley Challenge Cup
2018	Hambleden Pairs Challenge Cup
2024	Wyfold Challenge Cup
2026	Diamond Jubilee Challenge Cup

== Notable members ==
- Cath Bishop
- Katherine Grainger
- Mike Spracklen
- Gillian Lindsay
- Zac Purchase
- Ann Redgrave
- Steve Redgrave
- Naomi Riches
- Sarah Winckless

== See also ==
- Rowing on the River Thames
