= George Justice (mariner) =

George W. Justice (1881–1924) was a South Australian mariner and superintendent of lights under the South Australian Harbors Board. His role included traveling to and inspecting the lighthouses of the state along with buoys, markers and moorings. His reputation as a sailor was such that he was "devoid of fear". Justice was able to avert a major catastrophe on 21 August 1910 when the steamer South Africa caught fire in the North Arm of the Port Adelaide River, laden with a cargo of dynamite and other explosives. He ferried firemen to the burning vessel, and brought the crew back to shore when other mariners would not approach it. He received the King's Medal for his bravery during the incident. Justice helped establish new colonies for the Pearson Island rock-wallaby and relocated rabbits from Port Augusta to the north Neptune Islands, where lighthouse keepers were able to use them as food. He lived and died in the Port Adelaide district where he was weakened by diabetes before dying from pneumonia.
