= Mike Spracklen =

British rowing coach

Personal information
- Nationality: British (English)
- Born: 15 September 1937 (age 88) Marlow, Buckinghamshire, England

Sport
- Sport: Rowing
- Club: Marlow Rowing Club
Medal record
Rowing
Representing England
British Empire & Commonwealth Games
Gold medal – first place	1958 Cardiff	double sculls

Michael A. Spracklen, MSC OBE (born 15 September 1937) is a British rowing coach who has led teams from Great Britain, United States, Canada to success at the Olympic games and World Rowing Championships, including the early Olympic successes of Steve Redgrave. In 2002 he was named the International Rowing Federation coach of the year.

Spracklen was also part of the coaching team that brought Oxford University success in the annual Oxford-Cambridge Boat Race in the 1980s and early 1990s.

Spracklen's youngest son Adrian is a former British international lightweight oarsman and now coaches rowing at Mercyhurst College, Pennsylvania.

== Life and career ==
Spracklen was born in Marlow, Buckinghamshire, England. He represented the England team and won a gold medal in the double sculls at the 1958 British Empire and Commonwealth Games in Cardiff, Wales.

Spracklen's first major success was in coaching the Great Britain double scull to silver in the Montreal Olympic Games 1976. In 1984, he coached the Great Britain coxed four to gold at the Los Angeles Olympics, Britain's first Olympic gold medal in rowing since 1948. From that crew, he took Steve Redgrave and Andy Holmes to a further Olympic gold in the coxless pair (and bronze in the coxed pair) in Seoul in 1988, before moving to Canada as head coach of the national team in 1989.

The Canadian men's eight took gold at the 1992 Olympics under his tutelage, and Spracklen moved on to coach the U.S. squad. He inaugurated the rowing venue at the new Chula Vista Olympic Training Center. After a disappointing finishing position of fifth in the 1996 Atlanta Olympic eights, he returned to Great Britain as the women's national team coach.

Spracklen was also involved in the success of two highly successful single scullers, who switched to sculling from sweep rowing. After stroking the Canadian eight to gold in 1992, Derek Porter turned to single sculling and the following year became world champion. He continued to scull, and under Spracklen's programme he won silver in the 1996 Olympic Games. Jamie Koven also took to sculling after rowing in the US men's eight under Spracklen, and in 1997, he also became world champion.

In 1997 the British women won gold in the coxless four, silver in the double sculls and bronze in the eight. In the following year, 1998 the British women achieved their first heavyweight gold at a world championship, in the double sculls. After the 2000 Olympics, where the British women took silver in the quadruple sculls, the first Olympic medal for British women, Spracklen's contract was not renewed, with the BBC reporting discontent in the squad over his methods. The silver medal in the women's quad launched a successful four-Olympic medal career for Katherine Grainger.

Spracklen began coaching the Canadian men's squad in 2000, winning the gold medal for eights at the 2002, 2003 and 2007 World Championships and at the 2008 Olympics. After leading Canada's men's eight to a gold medal in Beijing in 2008 and a silver at the 2012 London Olympics, Rowing Canada announced in the fall of 2012 that it was moving forward without Spracklen on its coaching team.

== Coaching style ==
Spracklen's coaching revolves around finding a balance between the factors that affect the speed of the boat: Power (the effort per stroke), Length of Stroke, Rate (number of strokes taken each minute) and Technique.

Spracklen's ability to get athletes to commit fully to his program has been considered his greatest asset. A Spracklen athlete is expected have a balanced life but to prioritise rowing above other aspects of their lives. His program revolves around creating a core group of athletes which may or may not have previous experience on the world stage, and getting them to win. This core group then can be used to inspire a larger group to commit to the Spracklen program. Training runs in all seasons, with little to no cross-training and potentially 2 weeks off after a world championship or Olympic event. Training centers seldom require an invitation but rather allow anyone to participate in the training regime with the top athletes. That being said resources, including his time, are devoted to athletes and boats which are gold medal contenders.

== Coaching titles ==
Year	Championship	Event	Nation	Result
1976	Olympics	Men's double scull	Great Britain	Silver
1977	World Championships	Men's double scull	Great Britain	Gold
1978	World Championships	Men's double scull	Great Britain	Silver
1980	Moscow Olympic Games	Men's four scull	Japan	Boycott
1984	Olympics	Men's coxed four	Great Britain	Gold
1985	World Championship	Men's coxless pair	Great Britain	Silver
1986	World Championships	Men's coxed pair	Great Britain	Gold
1987	World Championships	Men's coxless pair	Great Britain	Gold
1987	World Championships	Coxed pair	Great Britain	Silver
1988	Olympics	Men's coxless pair	Great Britain	Gold
1988	Olympics	Men's coxed pair	Great Britain	Bronze
1989	World championships	Men's coxless Pair	Great Britain	Silver
1989	World Championships	Men's coxed four	Great Britain	Bronze
1990	World Championships	Men's eight	Canada	Silver
1990	World Championships	Women's single	Canada	Silver
1991	World Championships	Men's eight	Canada	Silver
1991	World Championships	Women's single	Canada	Gold
1992	Olympics	Men's eight	Canada	Gold
1992	Olympics	Women's Single Scull	Canada (Silken Laumann)	Bronze
1993	World Championships	Men's eight	USA	Bronze
1994	World Championships	Men's eight	USA	Gold
1995	World Championships	Men's eight	USA	Bronze
1995	World Championships	Women's single	Canada (Silken Laumann)	Silver
1996	Olympics	Men's eight	USA	5th
1996	Olympics	Women's single sculls	Canada (Silken Laumann)	Silver
1997	World Championships	Women's double sculls	Great Britain	Silver
1998	World Championships	Women's double sculls	Great Britain	Gold
1998	World Championships	Women's coxless pair	Great Britain	Silver
2000	Olympics	Women's quadruple sculls	Great Britain	Silver
2002	World Championships	Men's eight	Canada	Gold
2003	World Championships	Men's eight	Canada	Gold
2003	World Championships	Men's coxless four	Canada	Gold
2004	Olympics	Men's coxless four	Canada	Silver
2006	World Championships	Men's coxless pair	Canada	Bronze
2007	World Championships	Men's eight	Canada	Gold
2008	Olympics	Men's eight	Canada	Gold
2008	Olympics	Men's coxless pair	Canada	Silver
2009	World Championships	Men's eight	Canada	Silver
2011	World Championships	Men's eight	Canada	Bronze
2011	World Championships	Men's coxed pair	Canada	Bronze
2012	Olympics	Men's eight	Canada	Silver
2014	World Championships	Men's eight	Russia	6th
2015	European Championships	Men's eight	Russia	Bronze

== Honours ==
- 1989 Officer of the Order of the British Empire
- 1993 Meritorious Service Cross
- 1998 UK and England Coach of the Year by the National Coaching Foundation
- 2002 International Rowing Federation coach of the year.
- 2004 Spirit of Sport Foundation coach of the year
- 2007 Petro-Canada Coaching Excellence Award
