= George Justicz =

British rower (born 1931)

Personal information
- Born: 27 February 1931 Prague, Czechoslovakia
- Died: 7 March 2023 (aged 91) Pompano Beach, Florida, USA
- Height: 184 cm (6 ft 0 in)
- Weight: 80 kg (176 lb)

Sport
- Sport: Rowing
- Club: Birmingham Rowing Club; Leander Club
Medal record
Men's rowing
Representing England
British Empire and Commonwealth Games
Gold medal – first place	1962 Perth	Double sculls
European Championships
Silver medal – second place	1961 Prague	Double sculls

George Charles Justicz (27 February 1931– 7 March 2023) was an international rower who competed for Great Britain in the 1960 Olympic Games and won Double Sculls Challenge Cup at Henley Royal Regatta four times and the Wingfield Sculls.

== Biography ==
Justicz was born in Prague, Czechoslovakia. His family came to England and he rowed for the Royal Engineers Rowing Club, winning the 1956 Wyfold Challenge Cup at the Henley Royal Regatta. He became a member of Birmingham Rowing Club where he was captain in 1959 and 1960. He competed in the Diamond Challenge Sculls at Henley Royal Regatta in 1958. In 1959, partnering Nicholas Birkmyre, he was runner up at the Double Sculls Challenge Cup at Henley.

In 1960 the pair won the Double Sculls Challenge Cup and went on to compete in the double sculls event at the 1960 Summer Olympics in Rome. Justicz also won the Wingfield Sculls as a single sculler in 1960. Justicz and Birkmyre won the double sculls at Henley again in 1961 and won a silver medal at the 1961 European Rowing Championships.

The pair then joined the Leander Club and in 1962 won the double sculls at Henley, came fifth in the 1962 World Rowing Championships and won a gold medal at the 1962 British Empire and Commonwealth Games. They made their final winning appearance in the double sculls at Henley 1964.
