= Marcus Free =

Australian rower (born 1969)

Personal information
- Born: 30 July 1969 (age 57)
- Education: Bachelor of Business
- Occupation: English Teacher
- Height: 6 ft 3 in (191 cm)
- Weight: 205 lb (93 kg)
- Spouse: Melissa Free

Sport
- Sport: Rowing
- Club: Surfer's Paradise Rowing Club

Achievements and titles
- National finals: King's Cup 1991-2000 10 x Australian Champion
Medal record
Men's rowing
Representing Australia
World Rowing Championships
Bronze medal – third place	1997 Aiguebelette	Double Scull

Marcus Free is an Australian former rower.

== Rowing family ==
Free was born in Hobart, Tasmania. His father Reg Free rowed in numerous King's Cup crews for Tasmania from 1962 and in 1967, became the first Tasmanian oarsman selected to row in the Australian men's eight when they competed by invitation at the 1967 European Rowing Championships in Vichy, France. The family relocated to Queensland in 1983 and in the next decade Reg Free coached several Queensland King's Cup crews and coached his sons Marcus and younger brother Duncan to state, national and international victories.

Marcus now dedicates his time to coaching at Griffith University. His athletes include his oldest son Jackson.

== State and club rowing ==
Free first made state selection for Queensland in the 1996 men's senior eight contesting the King's Cup at the Interstate Regatta within the Australian Rowing Championships. He rowed in further King's Cup races for Queensland in 1997, 1998, 1999 and 2000. He rowed in all five of those King's Cup crews with his brother.

== International representative rowing ==
Marcus and Duncan, coached by Reg, were paired in the men's double scull at two world championships - 1997 in Aiguebelette and 1998 in Cologne. They took a bronze medal at Lac d'Aiguebelette, France in 1997. Before those World Championships they'd rowed at World Rowing Cups in Europe in each of those years. Free has also won the prestigious Henley Royal Regatta twice in the Double Sculls Challenge Cup, both in 1996 and 1997, with Peter Antonie and Duncan Free (brother), respectively.

Marcus has also gone on to become a successful rowing coach, coaching Cormac Kennedy-Leverett to a Silver medal at the 2018 World Junior Rowing Championships held in Racice, Czech Republic. Free again also coached Kennedy-Leverett to a 7th at the 2019 World Under 23 Rowing Championships held in Sarasota-Bradenton, USA.
