= Ken Tinegate =

British rower

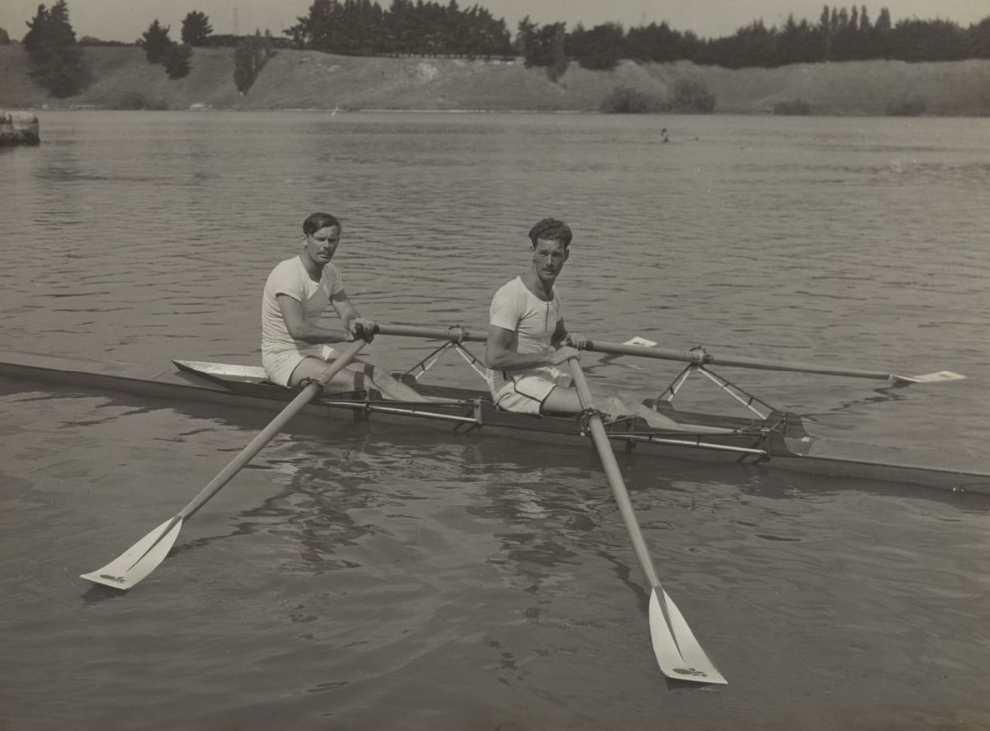
- 1950 British Empire Games, Tinegate (right) and Brown (left); Auckland Libraries Heritage Collections

Personal information
- Nationality: British (English)
- Born: April 1915 West Bromwich, England
- Died: 18 July 1958 (aged 43) Bromsgrove, England
- Occupation: Deputy Manager
- Spouse: Edna Child (1954–1958)

Sport
- Sport: Rowing
- Club: Birmingham RC
Medal record
Rowing
Representing England
British Empire Games
Bronze medal – third place	1950 Auckland	Double sculls

Kenneth William Tinegate (April 1915 – 18 July 1958) was an English rower who competed in the 1950 British Empire Games. During the 1950s, he was married to British Empire Games gold medalist diver Edna Child.

== Biography ==
=== Rowing ===
Tinegate had been associated with rowing since he was 17, having been a member of the Birmingham Rowing Club for over 20 years and winning "many trophies" in that time.

He represented England and won a bronze medal in the double sculls with Jack Brown at the 1950 British Empire Games in Auckland, New Zealand. Shortly before the Games the pair had to purchase a new boat after their previous one had been badly damaged by a submerged tree during training in Southport.

In June 1989, he had a boat named after him by Birmingham's Lord Mayor, Councillor Fred Chapman.

== Personal life ==
He was employed at the Hockley timber merchants business, started by his father E. W. Tinegate. He was also a former captain of Kings Norton Rugby Club.

During the Games in 1950 he lived at Oakfield Road, Selly Park, Birmingham and was a deputy manager. He was a member of the Birmingham Rowing Club.

On 16 October 1954, he married diver Edna Child, having met on the boat when sailing back home after the 1950 British Empire Games, where he stated his profession as a deputy manager. They spent their honeymoon in Italy. He died just under four years later on 18 July 1958 at Bromsgrove, leaving an estate worth just under £6,300 to Child, who survived him along with his two daughters.
