= Hans Ruckstuhl =

Swiss rower

Personal information
- Nationality: Swiss
- Born: January 26, 1943
- Died: October 9, 1987 (aged 44). Porto Heli

Sport
- Sport: Rowing

Hans Ruckstuhl (born 26 January 1943 in Lucerne, died 1987 in Porto Heli) was a Swiss rower. He competed at the 1968 Summer Olympics, 1972 Summer Olympics and the 1976 Summer Olympics.
