= Duncan Free =

Australian rower (born 1973)

Duncan Free OAM
Personal information
- Born: 25 May 1973 (age 53) Hobart, Tasmania, Australia

Sport
- Sport: Rowing
- Club: Surfers Paradise Rowing Club
Medal record
Men's rowing
Representing Australia
Olympic Games
Gold medal – first place	2008 Beijing	Coxless pair
Bronze medal – third place	1996 Atlanta	Quadruple sculls
World Rowing Championships
Gold medal – first place	2006 Eton	Coxless pair
Gold medal – first place	2007 Munich	Coxless pair
Bronze medal – third place	1997 Aiguebelette	Double sculls
Bronze medal – third place	1999 St. Catharines	Quadruple sculls
Commonwealth Rowing Championships
Gold medal – first place	1994 Ontario	M4X

Duncan Seth Free OAM (born 25 May 1973) is a retired Australian rower and Olympic gold medallist. He is 4-time Olympian and two-time world champion who represented Australia at four world rowing championships in both sculls and sweep oared boats. He was a six-time Australian national sculling champion.

== Rowing family ==
Free was born in Hobart, Tasmania. His father Reg Free rowed in numerous King's Cup crews for Tasmania from 1962 and in 1967, became the first Tasmanian oarsman selected to row in the Australian men's eight when they competed by invitation at the 1967 European Rowing Championships in Vichy, France. The family relocated to Queensland in 1983 and in the next decade Reg Free coached several Queensland King's Cup crews and coached his sons Marcus and Duncan to state, national and international victories.

== Club and state rowing ==
Duncan Free's senior rowing was from the Surfers Paradise Rowing Club in Queensland. Representing that club he raced for the national Australian sculling title at the Australian Rowing Championships for twelve consecutive years from 1993. He won that national title on six occasions.

He was the Queensland state representative sculler picked to race the President's Cup at the Australian Rowing Championships eight times from 1996 to 2004. Coached by his father, he won the interstate championship for Queensland on seven of those occasions.

Free won Diamond Sculls event at the 2001 Henley Royal Regatta racing for the Surfer's Paradise Rowing Club.

== National representative rowing ==
Duncan and his brother Marcus were paired in the men's double scull at two world championships (1997 and 1998) coached by Reg. They took a bronze medal at the 1997 World Rowing Championships at Lac d'Aiguebelette, France.

Duncan was seated in Australian Olympic quad sculls for the 1996, 2000 and 2004 Olympic Games. He won a bronze medal at Atlanta 1996, placed fourth in Sydney and seventh in Athens.

After the Athens Games, Duncan took a year off before switching to sweep rowing and establishing a partnership with gold medallist Drew Ginn in the coxless pair. They won at the World Championships 2006 and 2007 and took the gold medal at the 2008 Summer Olympics in Beijing.
