= Double scull =

Type of boat used in competitive rowing

Double scull icon

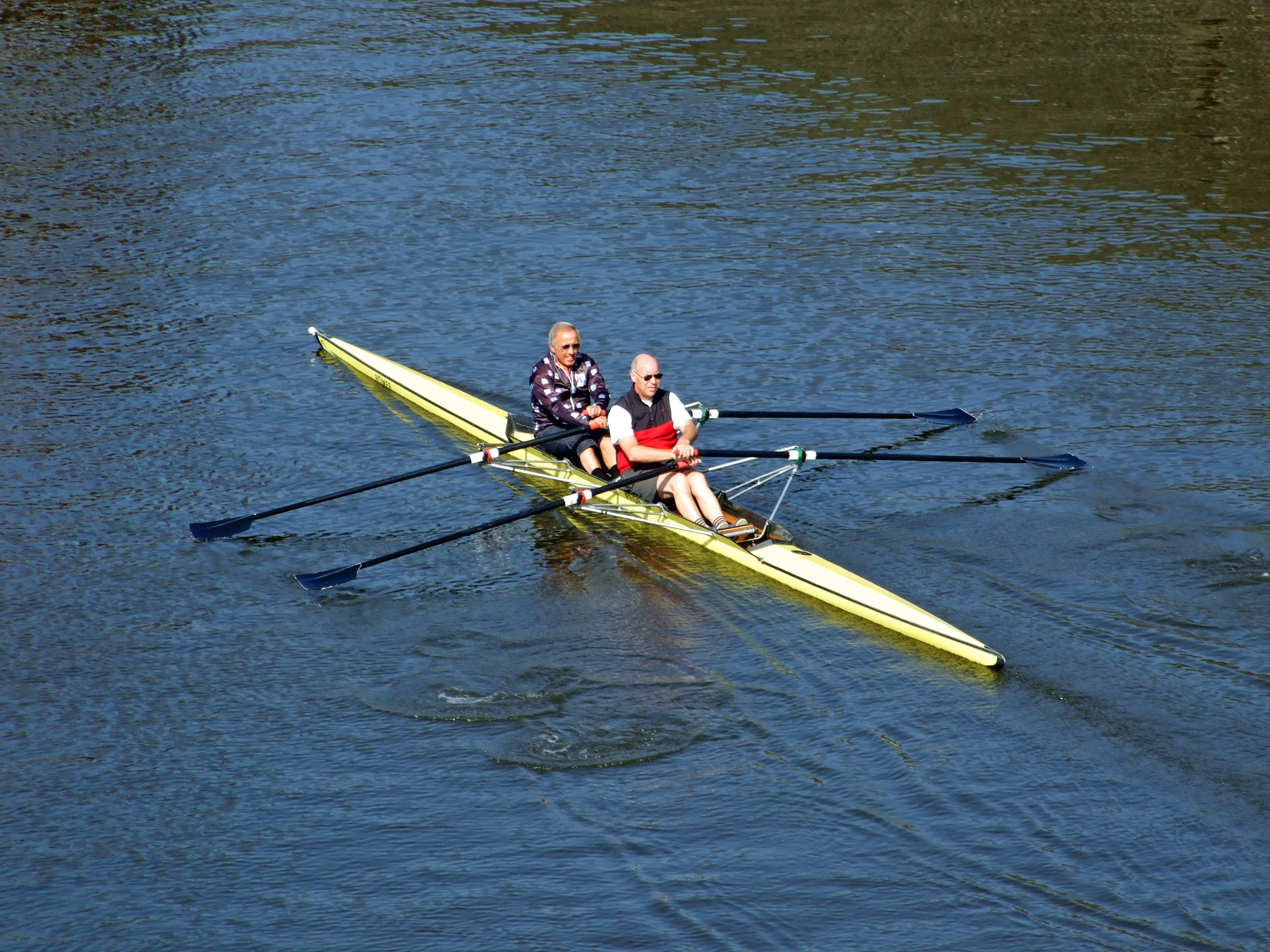
Double scull

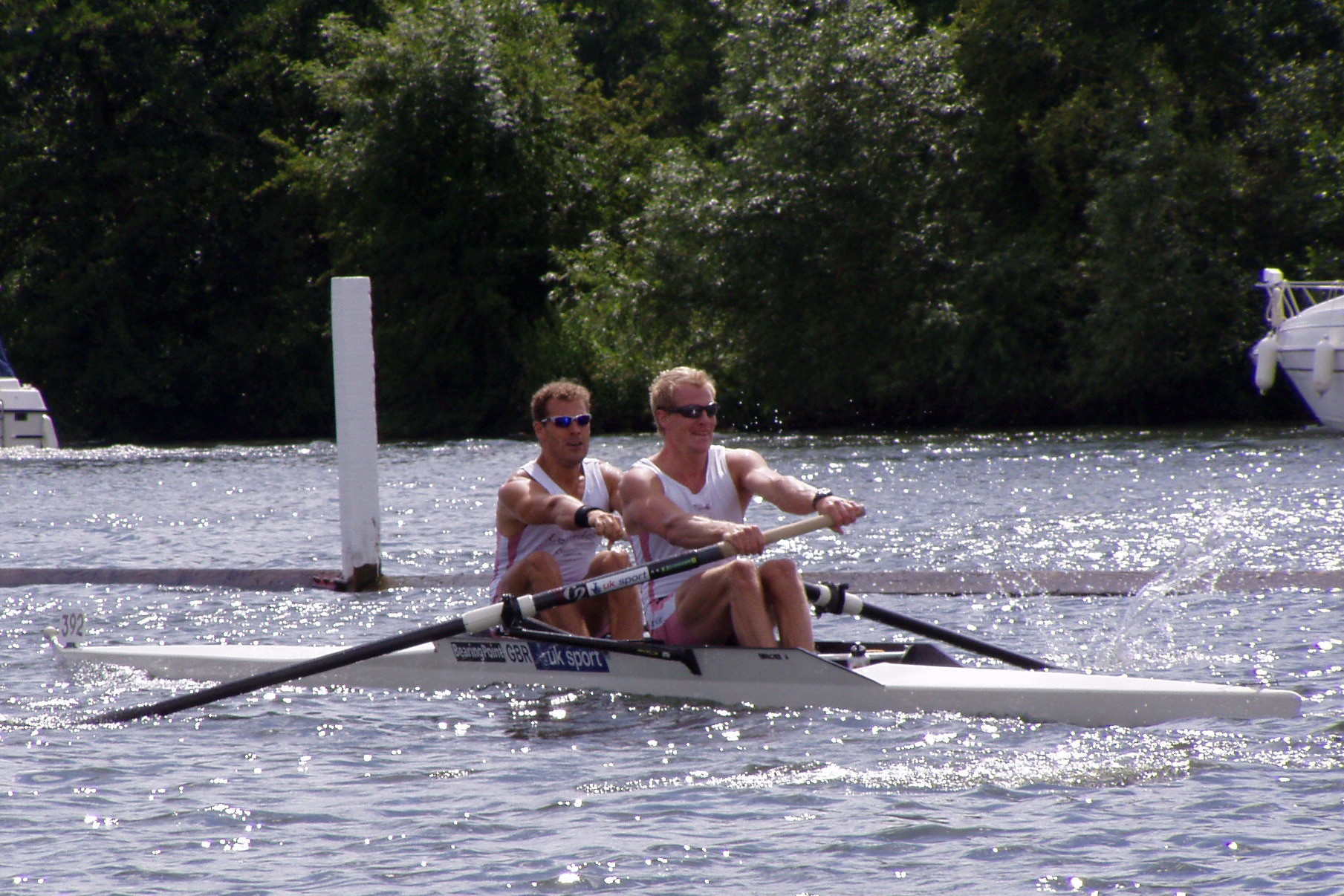
A contrasting coxless pair, with one oar per rower

A double scull, also abbreviated as a 2x, is a rowing boat used in the sport of competitive rowing. It is designed for two persons who propel the boat by sculling with two oars each, one in each hand.

Racing boats (often called "shells") are long, narrow, and broadly semicircular in cross-section in order to reduce drag to a minimum. They usually have a fin towards the rear, to help prevent roll and yaw. Originally made from wood, shells are now almost always made from a composite material (usually carbon-fibre reinforced plastic) for strength and weight advantages. The riggers in sculling apply the forces symmetrically to each side of the boat.

Double sculls is one of the classes recognized by the International Rowing Federation and the Olympics.

In contrast to the combination of the coxed pair, in which the distribution of the riggers means the forces are staggered alternately along the boat, the symmetrical forces in sculling make the boat more efficient and so the double scull is faster than the coxless pair.

A double sculling skiff has a similar layout to a double scull and is rowed in a similar way, but usually has a cox as well as two rowers. It is clinker built with fixed seats and thole pins and can be skiffed for leisure purposes or for the sport of skiff racing.

== See also ==
- Rowing at the Summer Olympics
- World Rowing Championships
- Double Sculls Challenge Cup at Henley Royal Regatta
- Single scull
- Quad scull
- Octuple scull
