= Rowing at the 1984 Summer Olympics – Men's single sculls =

Olympic rowing event

Men's single sculls at the Games of the XXIII Olympiad
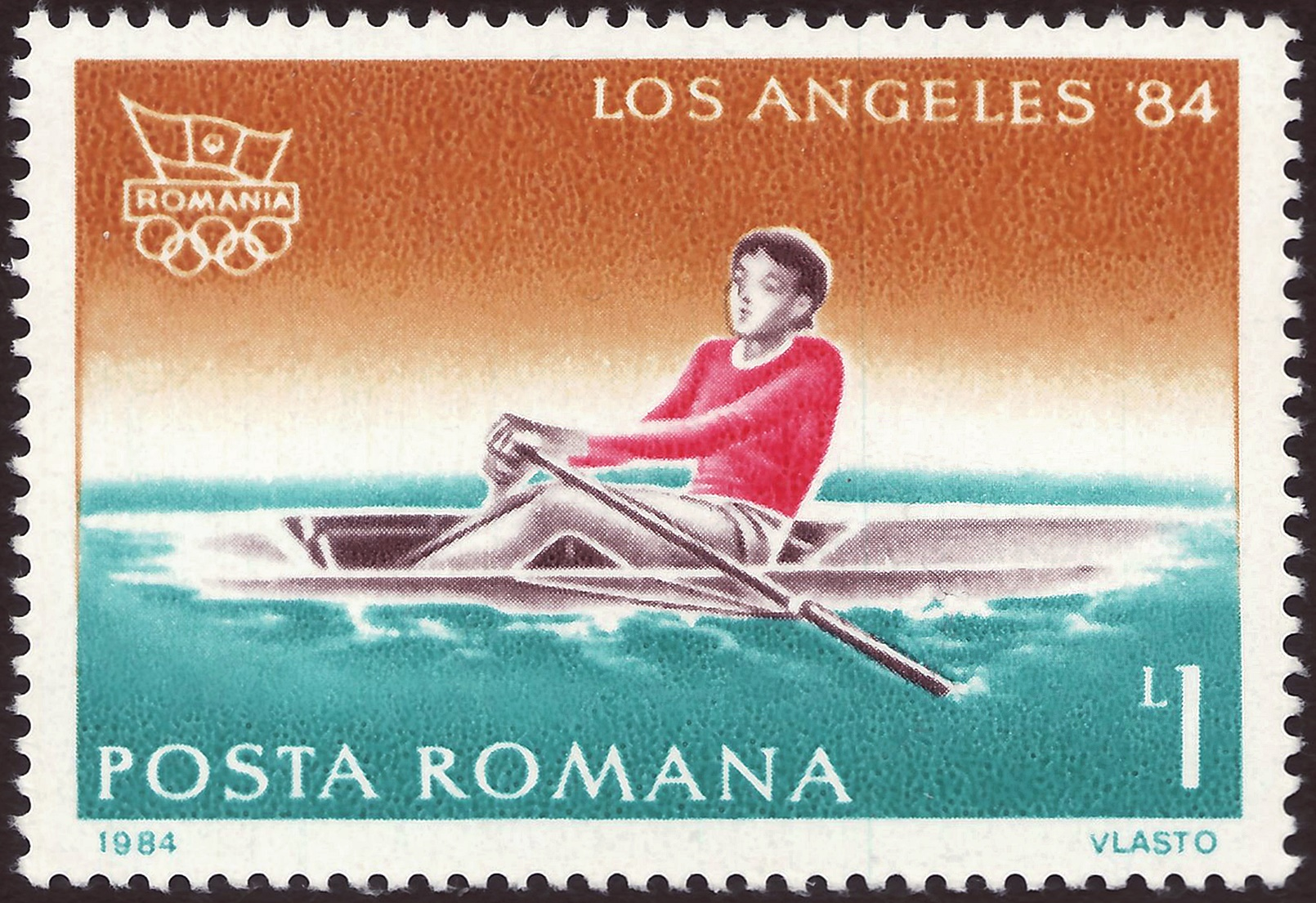
- Romanian stamp depicting single sculls at the 1984 Olympics
- Venue: Lake Casitas
- Dates: 31 July – 5 August 1984
- Competitors: 16 from 16 nations
- Winning time: 7:00.24

Medalists
1st place, gold medalist(s)		Pertti Karppinen; Finland
2nd place, silver medalist(s)		Peter-Michael Kolbe; West Germany
3rd place, bronze medalist(s)		Robert Mills; Canada

The men's single sculls competition at the 1984 Summer Olympics took place at Lake Casitas, California, United States of America. The event was held from 31 July to 5 August. There were 16 competitors from 16 nations, with each nation limited to a single boat in the event. The event was won by Pertti Karppinen of Finland, his third consecutive victory (matching Vyacheslav Ivanov's three golds from 1956 to 1964). Silver went to Peter-Michael Kolbe of West Germany; Kolbe, who had also taken silver in 1976, was the ninth man to earn multiple medals in the single sculls and the first to do so in non-consecutive Games (having missed the 1980 Olympics due to the American-led boycott). Canada earned its first medal in the event since 1912 with Robert Mills's bronze. East Germany's three-Games podium streak ended with no rowers from that nation present due to the Soviet-led boycott.

== Background ==
This was the 19th appearance of the event. Rowing had been on the programme in 1896 but was cancelled due to bad weather. The single sculls has been held every time that rowing has been contested, beginning in 1900.

Two of the 14 single scullers from the 1980 Games returned: two-time gold medalist Pertti Karppinen of Finland and eighth-place finisher Konstatinos Kontomanolis of Greece. The 1976 silver medalist Peter-Michael Kolbe of West Germany also returned after an absence in 1980 due to the American-led boycott, as did 1976 sixth-place finisher Ricardo Ibarra of Argentina. The Soviet-led boycott in 1984 had little effect on the favourites for the event. Karppinen was favoured to win a third gold, though Kolbe (1975, 1978, 1981, and 1983 World Champion) and Ibarra (1975, 1979, and 1983 Pan American champion and 1980 Diamond Challenge Sculls winner) were expected to challenge him.

Guatemala and Puerto Rico each made their debut in the event. The United States made its 15th appearance, tying the absent Great Britain for most among nations.

== Competition format ==
This rowing event was a single scull event, meaning that each boat was propelled by a single rower. The "scull" portion means that the rower used two oars, one on each side of the boat. The course used the 2000 metres distance that became the Olympic standard in 1912.

The tournament used the four-round format (three main rounds and a repechage) that had been used since 1968. The competition continued to use the six-boat heat standardised in 1960 as well as the "B" final for ranking 7th through 12th place introduced in 1964.

- Quarterfinals: Three heats of 5 or 6 boats each. The top boat in each heat (3 total) advanced directly to the semifinals. The remaining boats (13 total) went to the repechage.
- Repechage: Three heats of 4 or 5 boats each. The top three boats in each heat (9 total) rejoined the quarterfinal winners in the semifinals. The other boats (4 total) were eliminated.
- Semifinals: Two heats of 6 boats each. The top three boats in each heat (6 total) advanced to Final A, the remaining boats (6 total) went to Final B.
- Final: Two finals. Final A consisted of the top 6 boats. Final B placed boats 7 through 12.

== Schedule ==
All times are Pacific Daylight Time (UTC-7)

Date	Time	Round
Tuesday, 31 July 1984		Quarterfinals
Wednesday, 1 August 1984		Repechage
Thursday, 2 August 1984		Semifinals
Friday, 3 August 1984		Final B
Sunday, 5 August 1984		Final A

== Results ==
=== Quarterfinals ===
The winner in each heat advanced directly to the semifinals. The remaining rowers competed in the repechage round for the remaining spots in the semifinals.

==== Quarterfinal 1 ====
Rank	Rower	Nation	Time	Notes
1	Pertti Karppinen	Finland	7:20.93	Q
2	Peter-Michael Kolbe	West Germany	7:28.49	R
3	John Biglow	United States	7:31.30	R
4	José Ramón Oyarzábal	Spain	7:39.16	R
5	Denis Gate	France	7:41.22	R
6	Juan Félix	Puerto Rico	7:42.96	R

==== Quarterfinal 2 ====
Rank	Rower	Nation	Time	Notes
1	Robert Mills	Canada	7:24.10	Q
2	Gary Reid	New Zealand	7:27.10	R
3	Konstatinos Kontomanolis	Greece	7:35.92	R
4	Shunsuke Horiuchi	Japan	7:58.36	R
5	Edgar Nanne-Villagran	Guatemala	8:07.69	R

==== Quarterfinal 3 ====
Rank	Rower	Nation	Time	Notes
1	Ricardo Ibarra	Argentina	7:27.60	Q
2	Bengt Nilsson	Sweden	7:31.62	R
3	Raimund Haberl	Austria	7:33.50	R
4	Lars Bjønness	Norway	7:39.80	R
5	Herman van den Eerenbeemt	Netherlands	7:57.90	R

=== Repechage ===
The three fastest rowers in each repechage heat advanced to the semifinals.

==== Repechage heat 1 ====
Rank	Rower	Nation	Time	Notes
1	John Biglow	United States	7:21.47	Q
2	Gary Reid	New Zealand	7:26.12	Q
3	Juan Felix	Puerto Rico	7:26.85	Q
4	Lars Bjønness	Norway	7:29.01	
5	Edgar Nanne-Villagran	Guatemala	7:50.60	

==== Repechage heat 2 ====
Rank	Rower	Nation	Time	Notes
1	Peter-Michael Kolbe	West Germany	7:21.47	Q
2	Raimund Haberl	Austria	7:26.12	Q
3	Denis Gate	France	7:26.85	Q
4	Shunsuke Horiuchi	Japan	7:32.53	

==== Repechage heat 3 ====
Rank	Rower	Nation	Time	Notes
1	Konstatinos Kontomanolis	Greece	7:25.15	Q
2	Bengt Nilsson	Sweden	7:30.24	Q
3	José Ramón Oyarzábal	Spain	7:33.68	Q
4	Herman van den Eerenbeemt	Netherlands	7:34.28	

=== Semifinals ===
The three fastest rowers in each semifinal advanced to Final A, while the others went to Final B.

==== Semifinal 1 ====
Rank	Rower	Nation	Time	Notes
1	Pertti Karppinen	Finland	7:19.52	QA
2	Robert Mills	Canada	7:20.88	QA
3	Konstatinos Kontomanolis	Greece	7:23.99	QA
4	José Ramón Oyarzábal	Spain	7:32.72	QB
5	Gary Reid	New Zealand	7:34.15	QB
6	Raimund Haberl	Austria	7:38.48	QB

==== Semifinal 2 ====
Rank	Rower	Nation	Time	Notes
1	Peter-Michael Kolbe	West Germany	7:22.24	QA
2	Ricardo Ibarra	Argentina	7:22.42	QA
3	John Biglow	United States	7:24.98	QA
4	Bengt Nilsson	Sweden	7:33.28	QB
5	Juan Felix	Puerto Rico	7:34.70	QB
6	Denis Gate	France	8:00.33	QB

=== Finals ===
==== Final B ====
Final B was used to determine 7th – 12th places.

Rank	Rower	Nation	Time
7	Gary Reid	New Zealand	7:22.63
8	Raimund Haberl	Austria	7:25.38
9	Bengt Nilsson	Sweden	7:26.82
10	Juan Felix	Puerto Rico	7:36.38
11	José Ramón Oyarzábal	Spain	7:36.78
12	Denis Gate	France	7:37.82

==== Final A ====
Rank	Rower	Nation	Time
1st place, gold medalist(s)	Pertti Karppinen	Finland	7:00.24
2nd place, silver medalist(s)	Peter-Michael Kolbe	West Germany	7:02.19
3rd place, bronze medalist(s)	Robert Mills	Canada	7:10.38
4	John Biglow	United States	7:12.00
5	Ricardo Ibarra	Argentina	7:14.59
6	Konstatinos Kontomanolis	Greece	7:17.03

== Results summary ==
Rank	Rower	Nation	Quarterfinals	Repechage	Semifinals	Finals
1st place, gold medalist(s)	Pertti Karppinen	Finland	7:20.93	Bye	7:19.52	7:00.24; Final A
2nd place, silver medalist(s)	Peter-Michael Kolbe	West Germany	7:28.49	7:21.47	7:22.24	7:02.19; Final A
3rd place, bronze medalist(s)	Robert Mills	Canada	7:24.10	Bye	7:20.88	7:10.38; Final A
4	John Biglow	United States	7:31.30	7:21.47	7:24.98	7:12.00; Final A
5	Ricardo Ibarra	Argentina	7:27.60	Bye	7:22.42	7:14.59; Final A
6	Konstatinos Kontomanolis	Greece	7:35.92	7:25.15	7:23.99	7:17.03; Final A
7	Gary Reid	New Zealand	7:27.10	7:26.12	7:34.15	7:22.63; Final B
8	Raimund Haberl	Austria	7:33.50	7:26.12	7:38.48	7:25.38; Final B
9	Bengt Nilsson	Sweden	7:31.62	7:30.24	7:33.28	7:26.82; Final B
10	Juan Felix	Puerto Rico	7:42.96	7:26.85	7:34.70	7:36.38; Final B
11	José Ramón Oyarzábal	Spain	7:39.16	7:33.68	7:32.72	7:36.78; Final B
12	Denis Gate	France	7:41.22	7:26.85	8:00.33	7:37.82; Final B
13	Lars Bjønness	Norway	7:39.80	7:29.01	Did not advance	
14	Shunsuke Horiuchi	Japan	7:58.36	7:32.53	Did not advance	
15	Herman van den Eerenbeemt	Netherlands	7:57.90	7:34.28	Did not advance	
16	Edgar Nanne-Villagran	Guatemala	8:07.69	7:50.60	Did not advance	

== Sources ==
- The Official Report of the Games of the XXIIIrd Olympiad Los Angeles 1984 Volume Two (PDF) (PDF). pp. 523–524.
