= Rowing at the 1988 Summer Olympics – Men's single sculls =

Olympic rowing event

Men's single sculls at the Games of the XXIV Olympiad
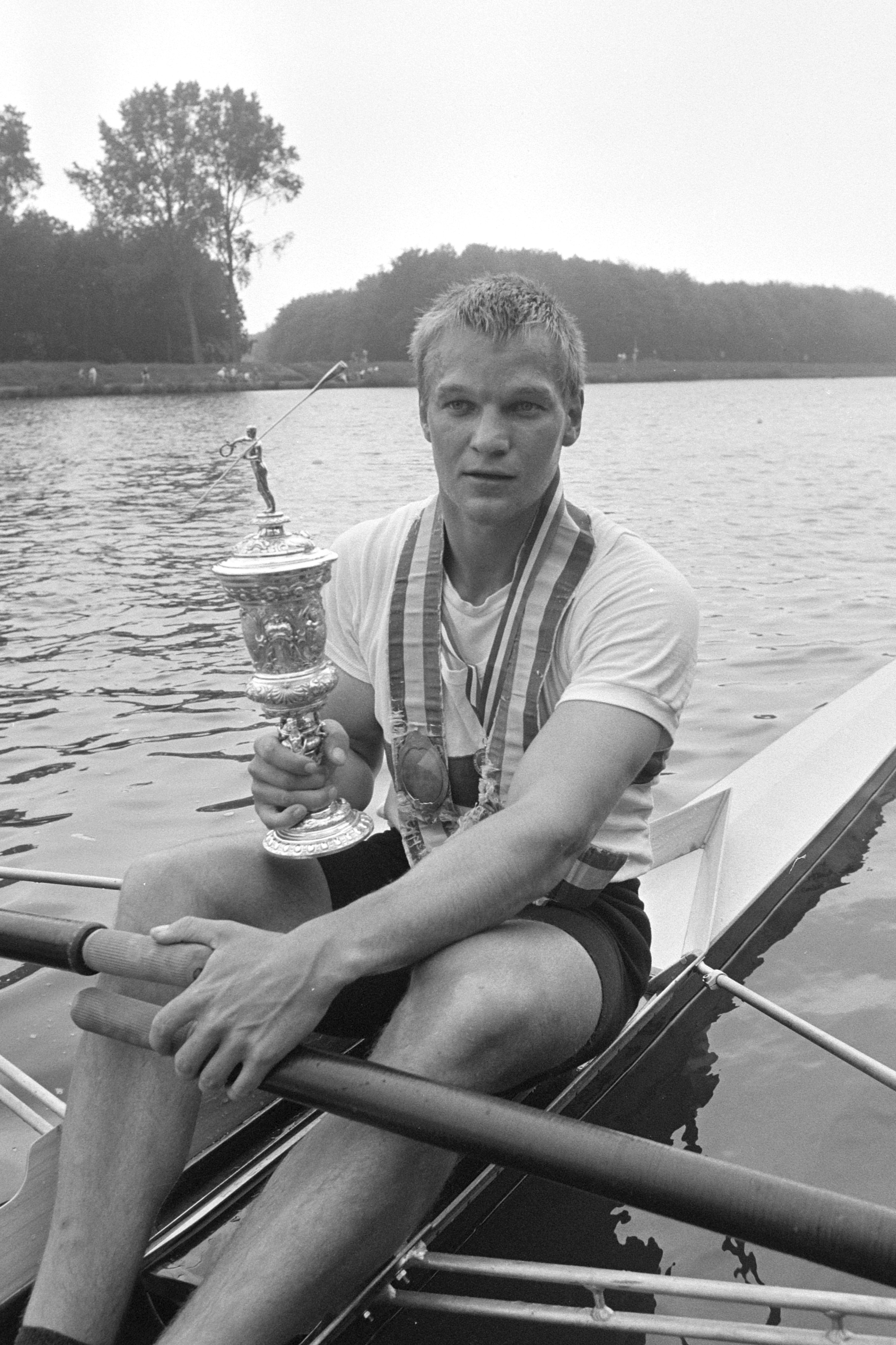
- Gold medalist Thomas Lange (1987)
- Venue: Misari Regatta
- Dates: 19–24 September 1988
- Competitors: 22 from 22 nations
- Winning time: 6:58.65

Medalists
1st place, gold medalist(s)		Thomas Lange; East Germany
2nd place, silver medalist(s)		Peter-Michael Kolbe; West Germany
3rd place, bronze medalist(s)		Eric Verdonk; New Zealand

The men's single sculls competition at the 1988 Summer Olympics took place at Misari Regatta, South Korea. The event was held from 19 to 24 September. It was the 20th appearance of the event, which had been held at every Olympic Games since the introduction of rowing in 1900. NOCs were limited to one boat apiece; 22 sent a competitor in the men's single sculls. Thomas Lange of East Germany won the event, denying Pertti Karppinen a record fourth-straight win and starting a two-Games winning streak (and three-Games medal streak) of his own. Peter-Michael Kolbe of West Germany took his third silver (after 1976 and 1984), joining Karppinen and Vyacheslav Ivanov as three-time medalists in the event (three other men, including Lange, have joined that group since, as of the 2016 Games). New Zealand earned its first medal in the event since 1920, with Eric Verdonk taking bronze.

== Background ==
Due to boycotts in 1980 and 1984, this was the first time since 1976 that all of the strongest rowing nations were present. The single sculls field included Finland's Pertti Karppinen (three-time defending gold medalist in 1976, 1980, and 1984), East Germany's Thomas Lange (then-current world champion, in his first Olympic appearance), and West Germany's Peter-Michael Kolbe (silver medalist behind Karppinen in 1976 and 1984, and five-time world champion). Andrew Sudduth of the United States had won a silver medal in 1984 in the eight; Dirk Crois of Belgium similarly changed events from 1984, when he took silver in double sculls. Other Olympic veterans were France's Pascal Body (5th in quadruple sculls in 1984), Brazil's Denis Marinho (7th in coxed four in 1984), and Puerto Rico's Juan Felix (10th in this event in 1984).

Kuwait, the Philippines, and South Korea each made their debut in the event. The United States made its 16th appearance, most among nations.

== Competition format ==
This rowing event was a single scull event, meaning that each boat was propelled by a single rower. The "scull" portion means that the rower used two oars, one on each side of the boat. The course used the 2000 metres distance that became the Olympic standard in 1912.

The competition consisted of three main rounds (quarterfinals, semifinals, and finals) as well as a repechage. The 22 boats were divided into four heats for the quarterfinals, with 5 or 6 boats in each heat. The winning boat in each heat (4 boats total) advanced directly to the semifinals. The remaining 18 boats were placed in the repechage. The repechage featured four heats of 4 or 5 boats each, with the top two boats in each heat (8 boats total) advancing to the semifinals and the remaining 10 boats (4th and 5th placers in the repechage) being eliminated. The 12 semifinalist boats were divided into two heats of 6 boats each. The top three boats in each semifinal (6 boats total) advanced to the "A" final to compete for medals and 4th through 6th place; the bottom three boats in each semifinal were sent to the "B" final for 7th through 12th.

== Schedule ==
All times are Korea Standard Time adjusted for daylight savings (UTC+10)

Date	Time	Round
Monday, 19 September 1988	12:05	Quarterfinals
Wednesday, 21 September 1988	11:52	Repechage
Thursday, 22 September 1988	16:20	Semifinals
Friday, 23 September 1988	10:23	Final B
Saturday, 24 September 1988	11:53	Final A

== Results ==
=== Quarterfinals ===
The winner in each heat advanced directly to the semifinals. The remaining rowers competed in the repechage round for the remaining spots in the semifinals.

==== Quarterfinal 1 ====
Rank	Rower	Nation	Time	Notes
1	Thomas Lange	East Germany	7:03.25	Q
2	Andrew Sudduth	United States	7:05.61	R
3	Peter-Michael Kolbe	West Germany	7:12.35	R
4	Kajetan Broniewski	Poland	7:13.77	R
5	Henk-Jan Zwolle	Netherlands	7:29.68	R
6	Juan Felix	Puerto Rico	7:55.46	R

==== Quarterfinal 2 ====
Rank	Rower	Nation	Time	Notes
1	Hamish McGlashan	Australia	7:25.26	Q
2	Jesús Posse	Uruguay	7:37.92	R
3	Jüri Jaanson	Soviet Union	7:41.28	R
4	Masahiro Sakata	Japan	7:43.67	R
5	Gordon Henry	Canada	7:51.83	R
6	Edgardo Maerina	Philippines	8:54.90	R

==== Quarterfinal 3 ====
Rank	Rower	Nation	Time	Notes
1	Eric Verdonk	New Zealand	7:18.69	Q
2	Pascal Body	France	7:26.12	R
3	Dirk Crois	Belgium	7:34.74	R
4	Giovanni Calabrese	Italy	7:45.02	R
5	Denis Marinho	Brazil	7:48.33	R

==== Quarterfinal 4 ====
Rank	Rower	Nation	Time	Notes
1	Fredrik Hultén	Sweden	7:12.98	Q
2	Pertti Karppinen	Finland	7:24.72	R
3	Arnold Jonke	Austria	7:30.45	R
4	Im Gyeong-seok	South Korea	7:39.94	R
5	Waleed Al-Mohamed Abdulmuhsin	Kuwait	8:05.35	R

=== Repechage ===
The two fastest rowers in each repechage heat advanced to the semifinals.

==== Repechage heat 1 ====
Rank	Rower	Nation	Time	Notes
1	Pertti Karppinen	Finland	7:14.91	Q
2	Henk-Jan Zwolle	Netherlands	7:16.23	Q
3	Dirk Crois	Belgium	7:19.94	
4	Masahiro Sakata	Japan	7:26.66	

==== Repechage heat 2 ====
Rank	Rower	Nation	Time	Notes
1	Jüri Jaanson	Soviet Union	7:04.04	Q
2	Kajetan Broniewski	Poland	7:04.39	Q
3	Pascal Body	France	7:05.80	
4	Waleed Al-Mohamed Abdulmuhsin	Kuwait	8:15.16	

==== Repechage heat 3 ====
Rank	Rower	Nation	Time	Notes
1	Peter-Michael Kolbe	West Germany	7:12.27	Q
2	Jesus Posse	Uruguay	7:17.43	Q
3	Denis Marinho	Brazil	7:22.84	
4	Im Gyeong-seok	South Korea	7:46.40	
5	Edgardo Maerina	Philippines	8:27.02	

==== Repechage heat 4 ====
Rank	Rower	Nation	Time	Notes
1	Andrew Sudduth	United States	7:05.52	Q
2	Giovanni Calabrese	Italy	7:12.93	Q
3	Arnold Jonke	Austria	7:18.29	
4	Juan Felix	Puerto Rico	7:18.77	
5	Gordon Henry	Canada	7:37.48	

=== Semifinals ===
The three fastest rowers in each semifinal advanced to the "A" final, while the others went to the "B" final.

==== Semifinal 1 ====
Rank	Rower	Nation	Time	Notes
1	Thomas Lange	East Germany	6:58.65	QA
2	Andrew Sudduth	United States	6:59.70	QA
3	Eric Verdonk	New Zealand	7:11.98	QA
4	Jesus Posse	Uruguay	7:27.43	QB
5	Henk-Jan Zwolle	Netherlands	7:30.45	QB
6	Jüri Jaanson	Soviet Union	7:32.51	QB

==== Semifinal 2 ====
Rank	Rower	Nation	Time	Notes
1	Peter-Michael Kolbe	West Germany	7:01.76	QA
2	Hamish McGlashan	Australia	7:03.40	QA
3	Kajetan Broniewski	Poland	7:03.90	QA
4	Fredrik Hulten	Sweden	7:04.36	QB
5	Giovanni Calabrese	Italy	7:23.69	QB
6	Pertti Karppinen	Finland	7:32.78	QB

=== Finals ===
==== Final B ====
Rank	Rower	Nation	Time
7	Pertti Karppinen	Finland	7:34.47
8	Jüri Jaanson	Soviet Union	7:35.09
9	Fredrik Hulten	Sweden	7:40.07
10	Giovanni Calabrese	Italy	7:43.31
11	Jesus Posse	Uruguay	7:44.18
12	Henk-Jan Zwolle	Netherlands	7:44.92

==== Final A ====
Rank	Rower	Nation	Time	Notes
1st place, gold medalist(s)	Thomas Lange	East Germany	6:49.86	OB
2nd place, silver medalist(s)	Peter-Michael Kolbe	West Germany	6:54.77	
3rd place, bronze medalist(s)	Eric Verdonk	New Zealand	6:58.66	
4	Hamish McGlashan	Australia	7:01.43	
5	Kajetan Broniewski	Poland	7:03.67	
6	Andrew Sudduth	United States	7:11.45	

== Results summary ==
Rank	Rower	Nation	Quarterfinals	Repechage	Semifinals	Final
1st place, gold medalist(s)	Thomas Lange	East Germany	7:03.25	Bye	6:58.65	6:49.86; Final A
2nd place, silver medalist(s)	Peter-Michael Kolbe	West Germany	7:12.35	7:12.27	7:01.76	6:54.77; Final A
3rd place, bronze medalist(s)	Eric Verdonk	New Zealand	7:18.69	Bye	7:11.98	6:58.66; Final A
4	Hamish McGlashan	Australia	7:25.26	Bye	7:03.40	7:01.43; Final A
5	Kajetan Broniewski	Poland	7:13.77	7:04.39	7:03.90	7:03.67; Final A
6	Andrew Sudduth	United States	7:05.61	7:05.52	6:59.70	7:11.45; Final A
7	Pertti Karppinen	Finland	7:24.72	7:14.91	7:32.78	7:34.47; Final B
8	Jüri Jaanson	Soviet Union	7:41.28	7:04.04	7:32.51	7:35.09; Final B
9	Fredrik Hulten	Sweden	7:12.98	Bye	7:04.36	7:40.07; Final B
10	Giovanni Calabrese	Italy	7:45.02	7:12.93	7:23.69	7:43.31; Final B
11	Jesus Posse	Uruguay	7:37.92	7:17.43	7:27.43	7:44.18; Final B
12	Henk-Jan Zwolle	Netherlands	7:29.68	7:16.23	7:30.45	7:44.92; Final B
13	Pascal Body	France	7:26.12	7:05.80	Did not advance	
14	Arnold Jonke	Austria	7:30.45	7:18.29	Did not advance	
15	Juan Felix	Puerto Rico	7:55.46	7:18.7	Did not advance	
16	Dirk Crois	Belgium	7:34.74	7:19.94	Did not advance	
17	Denis Marinho	Brazil	7:48.33	7:22.84	Did not advance	
18	Masahiro Sakata	Japan	7:43.67	7:26.66	Did not advance	
19	Gordon Henry	Canada	7:51.83	7:37.48	Did not advance	
20	Im Gyeong-seok	South Korea	7:39.94	7:46.40	Did not advance	
21	Waleed Al-Mohamed Abdulmuhsin	Kuwait	8:05.35	8:15.16	Did not advance	
22	Edgardo Maerina	Philippines	8:54.90	8:27.02	Did not advance	

== Sources ==
- The Official Report of the Games of the XXIV Olympiad Seoul 1988 Volume Two (PDF) (PDF). pp. 516–517.
