= Rowing at the 1980 Summer Olympics – Men's single sculls =

Olympic rowing event

Men's single sculls at the Games of the XXII Olympiad
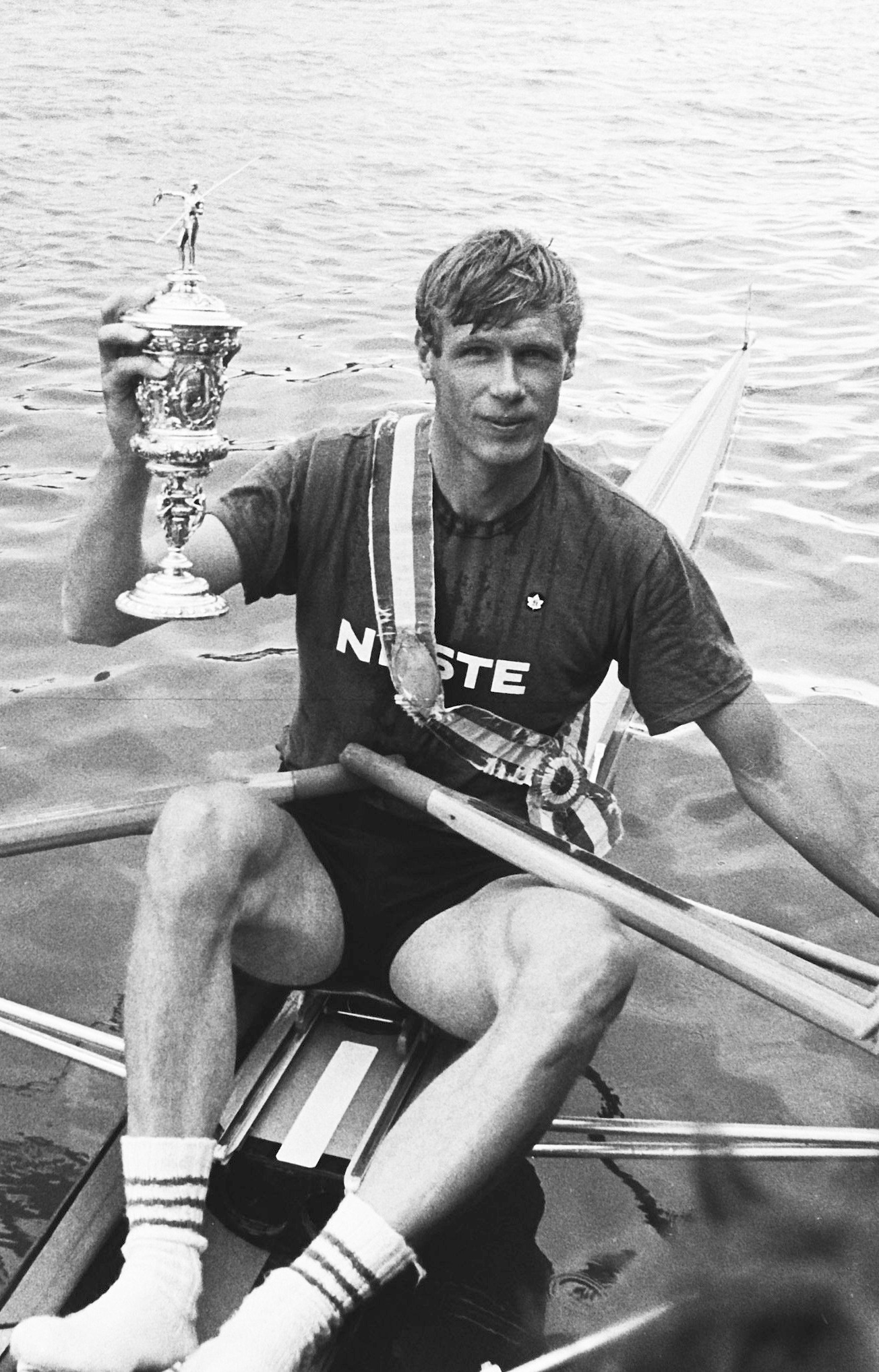
- Gold medalist Pertti Karppinen (at a different event in 1980)
- Venue: Moscow Canoeing and Rowing Basin
- Dates: 18–25 July 1980
- Competitors: 14 from 14 nations
- Winning time: 7:09.61

Medalists
1st place, gold medalist(s)		Pertti Karppinen; Finland
2nd place, silver medalist(s)		Vasil Yakusha; Soviet Union
3rd place, bronze medalist(s)		Peter Kersten; East Germany

The men's single sculls rowing competition at the 1980 Summer Olympics took place at Krylatskoye Sports Complex Canoeing and Rowing Basin, Moscow, Soviet Union. The event was held from 20 to 27 July. There were 14 competitors from 14 nations, with each nation limited to a single boat in the event. The event was won by Pertti Karppinen of Finland, his second of three consecutive victories from 1976 to 1984. Karppinen was the eighth man to win multiple medals in the event. Silver went to Vasil Yakusha of the Soviet Union, the nation's sixth medal in eight Games. East Germany took a third consecutive bronze medal, all by different rowers as Peter Kersten was the nation's men's single sculler this Games.

== Background ==
This was the 18th appearance of the event. Rowing had been on the programme in 1896 but was cancelled due to bad weather. The single sculls has been held every time that rowing has been contested, beginning in 1900.

Two of the 15 single scullers from the 1976 Games returned: gold medalist Pertti Karppinen of Finland and ninth-place finisher Hans Svensson of Sweden. Karppinen (also the reigning World Champion) was favoured to repeat, especially with his biggest rival (Peter-Michael Kolbe of West Germany, who had finished second to Karppinen in 1976 and would take two more silver medals in the event in 1984 and 1988) absent due to the American-led boycott. The only rower present with a major international victory was Hugh Matheson of Great Britain, the 1979 Diamond Challenge Sculls winner.

For the second consecutive Games, no nations made their debut in the event. Great Britain made its 15th appearance, most among nations.

== Competition format ==
This rowing event was a single scull event, meaning that each boat was propelled by a single rower. The "scull" portion means that the rower used two oars, one on each side of the boat. The course used the 2000 metres distance that became the Olympic standard in 1912.

The tournament used the four-round format (three main rounds and a repechage) that had been used since 1968. The competition continued to use the six-boat heat standardised in 1960 as well as the "B" final for ranking 7th through 12th place introduced in 1964.

- Quarterfinals: Three heats of 4 or 5 boats each. The top three boats in each heat (9 total) advanced directly to the semifinals. The remaining boats (5 total) went to the repechage.
- Repechage: One heat of 5 boats. The top three boats rejoined the quarterfinal winners in the semifinals. The other boats (2 total) were eliminated.
- Semifinals: Two heats of 6 boats each. The top three boats in each heat (6 total) advanced to Final A, the remaining boats (6 total) went to Final B.
- Final: Two finals. Final A consisted of the top 6 boats. Final B placed boats 7 through 12.

== Schedule ==
All times are Moscow Time (UTC+3)

Date	Time	Round
Sunday, 20 July 1980	11:20	Quarterfinals
Tuesday, 22 July 1980	11:00	Repechage
Thursday, 24 July 1980	11:20	Semifinals
Sunday, 27 July 1980	11:30	Finals

== Results ==
=== Quarterfinals ===
The three fastest rowers in each heat advanced to the semifinals. The remaining rowers competed in the repechage for the remaining spots in the semifinals.

==== Quarterfinal 1 ====
Rank	Rower	Nation	Time	Notes
1	Hugh Matheson	Great Britain	7:53.22	Q
2	Konstatinos Kontomanolis	Greece	7:55.61	Q
3	Paulo César Dworakowski	Brazil	8:01.38	Q
4	Didier Gallet	France	8:04.41	R
5	Arturo Salfran	Cuba	8:25.09	R

==== Quarterfinal 2 ====
Rank	Rower	Nation	Time	Notes
1	Pertti Karppinen	Finland	7:43.80	Q
2	Peter Kersten	East Germany	7:49.01	Q
3	Vladek Lacina	Czechoslovakia	7:53.24	Q
4	Bernard Destraz	Switzerland	7:59.81	R
5	Chavdar Radev	Bulgaria	8:04.96	R

==== Quarterfinal 3 ====
Rank	Rower	Nation	Time	Notes
1	Vasil Yakusha	Soviet Union	7:47.15	Q
2	Hans Svensson	Sweden	7:57.33	Q
3	Raimund Schmidt	Austria	8:07.02	Q
4	Lajos Ódor	Hungary	8:14.24	R

=== Repechage ===
The three fastest rowers in the repechage advanced to the semifinals.

Rank	Rower	Nation	Time	Notes
1	Bernard Destraz	Switzerland	7:25.97	Q
2	Lajos Odor	Hungary	7:27.49	Q
3	Chavdar Radoev	Bulgaria	7:28.96	Q
4	Didier Gallet	France	7:32.81	
5	Arturo Salfran	Cuba	7:51.84	

=== Semifinals ===
The three fastest rowers in each semifinal advanced to Final A, while the others went to Final B.

==== Semifinal 1 ====
Rank	Rower	Nation	Time	Notes
1	Peter Kersten	East Germany	7:11.99	QA
2	Vasil Yakusha	Soviet Union	7:15.14	QA
3	Hugh Matheson	Great Britain	7:21.05	QA
4	Lajos Odor	Hungary	7:32.94	QB
5	Raimund Schmidt	Austria	7:38.50	QB
6	Paulo Cesar Dvorawski	Brazil	7:39.28	QB

==== Semifinal 2 ====
Rank	Rower	Nation	Time	Notes
1	Pertti Karppinen	Finland	7:15.90	QA
2	Vladek Lacina	Czechoslovakia	7:18.66	QA
3	Hans Svensson	Sweden	7:19.66	QA
4	Konstatinos Kontomanolis	Greece	7:23.15	QB
5	Bernard Destraz	Switzerland	7:33.87	QB
6	Chavdar Radoev	Bulgaria	7:34.21	QB

=== Finals ===
==== Final B ====
Rank	Rower	Nation	Time
7	Bernard Destraz	Switzerland	7:19.90
8	Konstatinos Kontomanolis	Greece	7:20.29
9	Lajos Odor	Hungary	7:23.30
10	Chavdar Radoev	Bulgaria	7:23.50
11	Raimund Schmidt	Austria	7:29.16
12	Paulo Cesar Dvorawski	Brazil	7:32.00

==== Final A ====
Rank	Rower	Nation	Time
1st place, gold medalist(s)	Pertti Karppinen	Finland	7:09.61
2nd place, silver medalist(s)	Vasil Yakusha	Soviet Union	7:11.66
3rd place, bronze medalist(s)	Peter Kersten	East Germany	7:14.88
4	Vladek Lacina	Czechoslovakia	7:17.57
5	Hans Svensson	Sweden	7:19.38
6	Hugh Matheson	Great Britain	7:20.28

== Results summary ==
Rank	Rower	Nation	Quarterfinals	Repechage	Semifinals	Finals
1st place, gold medalist(s)	Pertti Karppinen	Finland	7:43.80	Bye	7:15.90	7:09.61; Final A
2nd place, silver medalist(s)	Vasil Yakusha	Soviet Union	7:47.15	Bye	7:15.14	7:11.66; Final A
3rd place, bronze medalist(s)	Peter Kersten	East Germany	7:49.01	Bye	7:11.99	7:14.88; Final A
4	Vladek Lacina	Czechoslovakia	7:53.24	Bye	7:18.66	7:17.57; Final A
5	Hans Svensson	Sweden	7:57.33	Bye	7:19.66	7:19.38; Final A
6	Hugh Matheson	Great Britain	7:53.22	Bye	7:21.05	7:20.28; Final A
7	Bernard Destraz	Switzerland	7:59.81	7:25.97	7:33.87	7:19.90; Final B
8	Konstatinos Kontomanolis	Greece	7:55.61	Bye	7:23.15	7:20.29; Final B
9	Lajos Odor	Hungary	8:14.24	7:27.49	7:32.94	7:23.30; Final B
10	Chavdar Radoev	Bulgaria	8:04.96	7:28.96	7:34.21	7:23.50; Final B
11	Raimund Schmidt	Austria	8:07.02	Bye	7:38.50	7:29.16; Final B
12	Paulo Cesar Dvorawski	Brazil	8:01.38	Bye	7:39.28	7:32.00; Final B
13	Didier Gallet	France	8:04.41	7:32.81	Did not advance	
14	Arturo Salfran	Cuba	8:25.09	7:51.84	Did not advance	

== Sources ==
- The Official Report of the Games of the XXII Olympiad Moscow 1980 Volume Three (PDF) (PDF). p. 103.
