= Rowing at the 1976 Summer Olympics – Men's single sculls =

Olympic rowing event

Men's single sculls at the Games of the XXI Olympiad
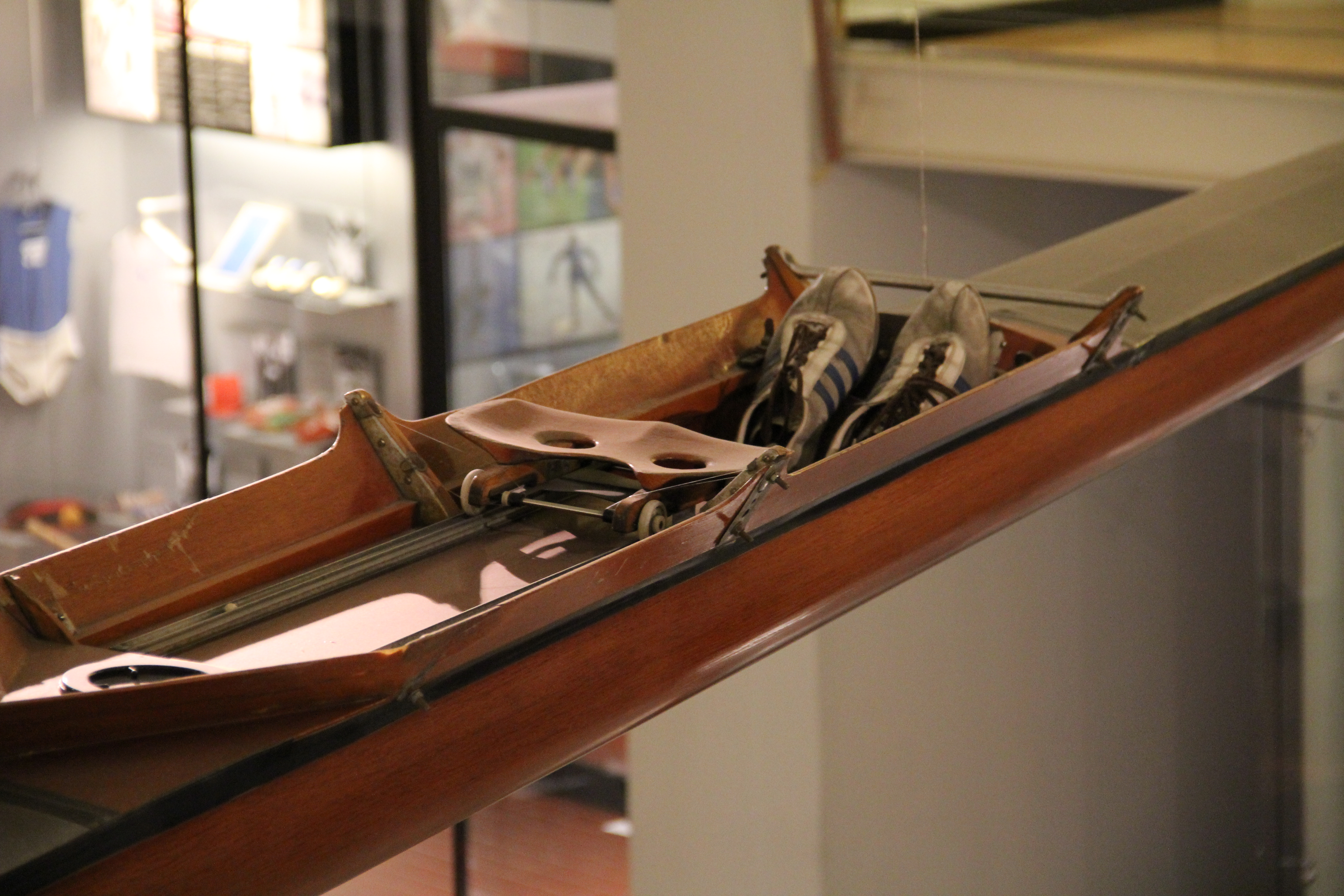
- Gold medalist Pertti Karppinen's boat
- Venue: Notre Dame Island Olympic Basin
- Dates: 18–25 July 1976
- Competitors: 15 from 15 nations
- Winning time: 7:29.03

Medalists
1st place, gold medalist(s)		Pertti Karppinen; Finland
2nd place, silver medalist(s)		Peter-Michael Kolbe; West Germany
3rd place, bronze medalist(s)		Joachim Dreifke; East Germany

The men's single sculls competition at the 1976 Summer Olympics took place at Notre Dame Island Olympic Basin, Canada. The event was held from 18 to 25 July. There were 15 competitors from 15 nations, with each nation limited to a single boat in the event. The event was won by Pertti Karppinen of Finland, the nation's first medal in the men's single sculls. Karppinen would go on to win three consecutive golds in the event, matching the Soviet Union's Vyacheslav Ivanov who did the same from 1956 to 1964. Silver went to Peter-Michael Kolbe of West Germany; East Germany took its second consecutive bronze medal in the event, this time with Joachim Dreifke as the rower.

== Background ==
This was the 17th appearance of the event. Rowing had been on the programme in 1896 but was cancelled due to bad weather. The single sculls has been held every time that rowing has been contested, beginning in 1900.

Two of the 18 single scullers from the 1972 Games returned: fifth-place finisher Jim Dietz of the United States and seventh-place finisher Seán Drea of Ireland. The two men had each won a silver medal at the World Championships since then (Dietz in 1974 and Drea in 1975), as that event moved from a quadrennial tournament to an annual one; Drea had also won three Diamond Challenge Sculls victories. The reigning World Champion was Peter-Michael Kolbe of West Germany. Kolbe was favored, though Drea was a significant challenger, as was 1975 Pan American champion Ricardo Ibarra of Argentina.

No nations made their debut in the event. The United States made its 14th appearance, tying the absent Great Britain for most among nations.

== Competition format ==
This rowing event was a single scull event, meaning that each boat was propelled by a single rower. The "scull" portion means that the rower used two oars, one on each side of the boat. The course used the 2000 metres distance that became the Olympic standard in 1912.

The tournament used the four-round format (three main rounds and a repechage) that had been used since 1968. The competition continued to use the six-boat heat standardised in 1960 as well as the "B" final for ranking 7th through 12th place introduced in 1964.

- Quarterfinals: Three heats of 5 boats each. The top three boats in each heat (9 total) advanced directly to the semifinals. The remaining boats (6 total) went to the repechage.
- Repechage: One heat of 6 boats. The top three boats rejoined the quarterfinal winners in the semifinals. The other boats (3 total) were eliminated.
- Semifinals: Two heats of 6 boats each. The top three boats in each heat (6 total) advanced to Final A, the remaining boats (6 total) went to Final B.
- Final: Two finals. Final A consisted of the top 6 boats. Final B placed boats 7 through 12.

== Schedule ==
All times are Eastern Daylight Time (UTC-4)

Date	Time	Round
Sunday, 18 July 1976	12:15	Quarterfinals
Tuesday, 20 July 1976	10:45	Repechage
Friday, 23 July 1976	11:30	Semifinals
Sunday, 25 July 1976	11:45	Finals

== Results ==
=== Quarterfinals ===
The three fastest rowers in each heat advanced to the semifinals. The remaining rowers competed in the repechage for the remaining spots in the semifinals.

==== Quarterfinal 1 ====
Rank	Rower	Nation	Time	Notes
1	Peter-Michael Kolbe	West Germany	7:05.95	Q
2	Sean Drea	Ireland	7:07.20	Q
3	Joachim Dreifke	East Germany	7:11.49	Q
4	Pertti Karppinen	Finland	7:12.94	R
5	Jim Dietz	United States	7:24.98	R

==== Quarterfinal 2 ====
Rank	Rower	Nation	Time	Notes
1	Mykola Dovhan	Soviet Union	7:28.92	Q
2	Fabrizio Biondi	Italy	7:35.33	Q
3	Hans Svensson	Sweden	7:40.82	Q
4	Walter Lambertus	Romania	7:42.65	R
5	Reinaldo Kutscher	Uruguay	7:48.59	R

==== Quarterfinal 3 ====
Rank	Rower	Nation	Time	Notes
1	Ricardo Ibarra	Argentina	7:17.41	Q
2	Edward Hale	Australia	7:20.11	Q
3	Claude Dehombreux	Belgium	7:23.33	Q
4	Ulli Wolf	Austria	7:28.45	R
5	Federico Scheffler	Mexico	7:32.55	R

=== Repechage ===
The three fastest rowers in the repechage advanced to the semifinals.

Rank	Rower	Nation	Time	Notes
1	Pertti Karppinen	Finland	7:06.81	Q
2	Walter Lambertus	Romania	7:08.88	Q
3	Jim Dietz	United States	7:13.46	Q
4	Ulli Wolf	Austria	7:25.38	
5	Reinaldo Kutscher	Uruguay	7:26.34	
6	Federico Scheffler	Mexico	7:37.98	

=== Semifinals ===
Three fastest rowers in each semi-final advanced to the Final A, while the others to the Final B.

==== Semifinal 1 ====
Rank	Rower	Nation	Time	Notes
1	Ricardo Ibarra	Argentina	6:57.41	QA
2	Peter-Michael Kolbe	West Germany	6:59.18	QA
3	Joachim Dreifke	East Germany	6:59.36	QA
4	Walter Lambertus	Romania	7:01.23	QB
5	Claude Dehombreux	Belgium	7:14.76	QB
6	Fabrizio Biondi	Italy	7:16.13	QB

==== Semifinal 2 ====
Rank	Rower	Nation	Time	Notes
1	Sean Drea	Ireland	6:52.46	QA
2	Mykola Dovhan	Soviet Union	6:58.15	QA
3	Pertti Karppinen	Finland	6:59.13	QA
4	Hans Svensson	Sweden	7:00.60	QB
5	Jim Dietz	United States	7:09.13	QB
6	Edward Hale	Australia	7:16.64	QB

=== Finals ===
==== Final B ====
Rank	Rower	Nation	Time
7	Jim Dietz	United States	7:58.70
8	Edward Hale	Australia	7:58.86
9	Hans Svensson	Sweden	7:59.36
10	Fabrizio Biondi	Italy	8:07.17
11	Walter Lambertus	Romania	8:11.13
12	Claude Dehombreux	Belgium	8:15.35

==== Final A ====
Rank	Rower	Nation	Time
1st place, gold medalist(s)	Pertti Karppinen	Finland	7:29.03
2nd place, silver medalist(s)	Peter-Michael Kolbe	West Germany	7:31.67
3rd place, bronze medalist(s)	Joachim Dreifke	East Germany	7:38.03
4	Sean Drea	Ireland	7:42.53
5	Mykola Dovhan	Soviet Union	7:57.39
6	Ricardo Ibarra	Argentina	8:03.35

== Results summary ==
Rank	Rower	Nation	Quarterfinals	Repechage	Semifinals	Final
1st place, gold medalist(s)	Pertti Karppinen	Finland	7:12.94	7:06.81	6:59.13	7:29.03; Final A
2nd place, silver medalist(s)	Peter-Michael Kolbe	West Germany	7:05.95	Bye	6:59.18	7:31.67; Final A
3rd place, bronze medalist(s)	Joachim Dreifke	East Germany	7:11.49	Bye	6:59.36	7:38.03; Final A
4	Sean Drea	Ireland	7:07.20	Bye	6:52.46	7:42.53; Final A
5	Mykola Dovhan	Soviet Union	7:28.92	Bye	6:58.15	7:57.39; Final A
6	Ricardo Ibarra	Argentina	7:17.41	Bye	6:57.41	8:03.35; Final A
7	Jim Dietz	United States	7:24.98	7:13.46	7:09.13	7:58.70; Final B
8	Edward Hale	Australia	7:20.11	Bye	7:16.64	7:58.86; Final B
9	Hans Svensson	Sweden	7:40.82	Bye	7:00.60	7:59.36; Final B
10	Fabrizio Biondi	Italy	7:35.33	Bye	7:16.13	8:07.17; Final B
11	Walter Lambertus	Romania	7:42.65	7:08.88	7:01.23	8:11.13; Final B
12	Claude Dehombreux	Belgium	7:23.33	Bye	7:14.76	8:15.35; Final B
13	Ulli Wolf	Austria	7:28.45	7:25.38	Did not advance	
14	Reinaldo Kutscher	Uruguay	7:48.59	7:26.34	Did not advance	
15	Federico Scheffler	Mexico	7:32.55	7:37.98	Did not advance	

== Sources ==
- The official report of the Games of the XXI Olympiad Montreal 1976 (PDF) (PDF). p. 97.
