= Destraz =

- Pronunciation: pronounced [dɛstʁa]

Origin
- Origin: Franco-Provençal
- Meaning: from D'Estraz, estraz is cognate of estre in French (cf. extera), .
- Region of origin: Savoy

Other names
- Variant forms: Destras, Delétraz, Délétraz, Deletraz, Delestre

Destraz is a surname. Notable people with the surname include:

- Bernard Destraz (born 1955), Swiss rower
- Henri Destraz a.k.a. Henri Dès (born 1940), Swiss children's singer and songwriter
