= Gary Reed =

Gary Reed is the name of:

- Gary Reed (comics) (1956–2016), US comic book writer and publisher
- Gary Reed (athlete) (born 1981), Canadian middle-distance runner

== See also ==
- Gary Reid (1960), New Zealand rower
