= Edgardo Maerina =

Filipino rower (born 1964)

Personal information
- Nationality: Filipino
- Born: 31 March 1964 (age 60)

Sport
- Sport: Rowing

Edgardo Maerina (born 31 March 1964) is a Filipino rower. He competed in the men's single sculls event at the 1988 Summer Olympics. He later served as head coach of the Philippine national rowing team as part of the Philippine Rowing Association.
