= Depestre =

Depestre is a surname. Notable people with the surname include:

- Pedro Depestre (1945–2001), Cuban violinist, arranger, and musical director
- René Depestre (born 1926), Haitian poet and former communist activist

== See also ==
- Delestre
