= Mykola Dovhan =

Soviet rower

Medal record

Men's rowing

Representing the Soviet Union

Olympic Games
Silver medal – second place	1980 Moscow	Quadruple sculls

World Rowing Championships
Bronze medal – third place	1974 Lucerne	Single sculls
Bronze medal – third place	1977 Amsterdam	Single sculls

Mykola Anatoliyovich Dovhan (Ukrainian: Микола Анатолійович Довгань; born 15 July 1955), known as Mykola Dovhan or Nikolai Dovgan, is a Ukrainian rower who competed for the Soviet Union in the 1976 Summer Olympics and in the 1980 Summer Olympics.

In 1976, he finished fifth in the single sculls event.

Four years later he was a crew member of the Soviet boat which won the silver medal in the quadruple sculls competition.
