= Arturo Salfran =

Cuban rower

Personal information
- Nationality: Cuban
- Born: 21 September 1958 (age 66)

Sport
- Sport: Rowing

Arturo Salfran (born 21 September 1958) is a Cuban rower. He competed in the men's single sculls event at the 1980 Summer Olympics.
