= Deletraz =

Lozac'h
- Pronunciation: pronounced [dø letʁa]

Origin
- Origin: Franco-Provençal
- Meaning: from l'Etraz, etraz is cognate of estre in French (cf. extera), .
- Region of origin: Savoy

Other names
- Variant forms: Delétraz, Délétraz, Delestre, Destraz

Deletraz or Delétraz is a surname of Arpitan origin. Like many Arpitan anthroponyms, the final -z only marks paroxytonic stress and should not be pronounced. Nevertheless, it is often pronounced in French through hypercorrection. Notable people with the surname include:

- Jean-Denis Délétraz (born 1963), Swiss racing driver
- Julien Delétraz (born 1985), French professional footballer
- Louis Delétraz (born 1997), Swiss racing driver
