= Paulo César Dworakowski =

Brazilian rower

Personal information
- Born: 12 September 1956 (age 68); Rio de Janeiro, Brazil

Sport
- Sport: Rowing

Paulo César Dworakowski (born 12 September 1956) is a Brazilian rower. He competed in the men's single sculls event at the 1980 Summer Olympics.
