= Chavdar Radev =

Bulgarian rower

Personal information
- Nationality: Bulgarian
- Born: 5 April 1959 (age 65)

Sport
- Sport: Rowing

Chavdar Radev (Bulgarian: Чавдар Радев, born 5 April 1959) is a Bulgarian rower. He competed in the men's single sculls event at the 1980 Summer Olympics.
