= Bengt Nilsson (rower) =

Swedish rower

Personal information
- Nationality: Swedish
- Born: 4 September 1954 (age 70); Landskrona, Sweden

Sport
- Sport: Rowing

Bengt Nilsson (born 4 September 1954) is a Swedish rower. He competed in the men's single sculls event at the 1984 Summer Olympics.
