= Edward Hale (rower) =

Australian rower (born 1947)

Ted Hale
Personal information
- Full name: Edward Officer Hale
- Nationality: Australian
- Born: 23 August 1947 (age 79)
- Education: University of Tasmania

Sport
- Sport: Rowing
- Club: Lindisfarne Rowing Club; Sydney Rowing Club

Achievements and titles
- National finals: President's Cup 1972-1984; King's Cup 1970; Open single scull 1980-82; Open double scull 1974-79; Open quad scull 1976-80; Open coxless pair 1979

Edward Officer Hale (born 23 August 1947) is an Australian former rower. He competed at the elite level over a fifteen-year period from 1970 to 1984, primarily as a sculler. He was a fourteen time Australian national champion - nine times in a single scull, four times in crewed sculling boats and once in a sweep oared pair. He won the New Zealand national single sculls championship in 1976. He represented at two World Rowing Championships and competed in the men's single sculls event at the 1976 Summer Olympics.

== Club and state rowing ==
Raised in Tasmania, Hale's senior rowing was from the Lindisfarne Rowing Club and the University of Tasmania. Rowing for the University of Tasmania he won the intervarsity single sculls title at the Australian University Championships in 1971 and 1972. After relocating to Sydney in 1976 he rowed from the Sydney Rowing Club.

Hale first made state selection for Tasmania in the men's eight contesting the 1970 King's Cup at the Interstate Regatta. In 1972 he was selected as Tasmania's single sculls entrant to race the President's Cup at the Interstate Regatta. He rowed again for Tasmania in the President's Cup in 1973 when he and Jeff Sykes of New South Wales initially rowed to a dead-heat. They re-rowed the event ninety minutes later and Sykes won by a five-second margin. He raced in that event again for Tasmania in 1974, 1975 and 1984

By 1976 Hale had relocated to Sydney and from 1976 to 1982 he represented New South Wales as their single sculls entrant in the President's Cup. He won those events on six occasions, all consecutive from 1976 to 1981. All told, Hale contested the Presidents Cup (for NSW and Tasmania) on a record twelve occasions.

In Lindisfarne colours and rowing with Steve Spurling he twice contested the national double sculls title at the Australian Rowing Championships in 1974 and 1975 placing second both times. In Sydney Rowing Club colours he contested the national double sculls title - he won in 1976 and placed second in 1977, 1978 and 1979. He contested and won the quad sculls title in 1976, 1978 and 1979; and placed second in that boat class in 1980. He won the coxless pair title in 1979 with Chris Shinners of SUBC. In 1980 an open single sculls event was introduced to the Australian Rowing Championships (in addition to the President's Cup Interstate event). Hale won that title in SRC colours in 1980, 1981 and 1982.

In 1976 he won the New Zealand national single sculls title.

Hale won seventeen state single sculls titles at various state championships in Australian between 1971 and 1982 - seven Tasmanian state titles (1971 to 1975 and 1983 to 1984); six New South Wales state titles (1976 to 1977 and 1979 to 1982); three Victorian state titles (1973, 1978 and 1981); and the South Australian state title in 1980.

== International representative rowing ==
In 1976 Hale won the Diamond Challenge Sculls event at the Henley Royal Regatta.

Hale made his national representative debut as Australia's single sculls entrant event at the 1976 Montreal Olympics. He placed second in his heat, missed the A final and placed eight overall. At the 1978 World Rowing Championships in Lake Karapiro he was selected as the single sculls competitor and finished in overall tenth place. For the 1979 World Rowing Championships in Bled, Hale was selected as the sculler but an injury to Rob Lang in the Australian men's eight saw Hale step into the five seat for the eight's campaign. That crew placed third in their semi-final and fourth in the final.

== Accolades ==
In 1976 he won the accolade of New South Wales' Oarsman of the Year. He was inducted into Tasmania's Sporting Hall of Fame in 1987.

== Coach ==
From 1978 to 1990 Hale was a successful coach. He coached extensively at the Tweed Heads Rowing and Athletic Club and took school level and junior scullers to national championships and title wins. His senior coaching highlights included Shanne McGinnis, a Tasmanian sculler who won a state title and contested national championships; Bob Allen, a three-time national lightweight sculling champion from the Sydney Rowing Club; Jenny Hafey from Tweed Heads a national junior and senior sculling champion; and the 1986 Queensland King's Cup eight.

== Boat builder ==
Hale began building racing shells before his competitive career ended. He won the 1982 President's Cup in a fibreglass scull of his own design and construction. He started a business using traditional timber construction and by 1994 he had started a construction facility in China as a joint venture between Ted Hale Rowing and the Department of Physical Culture and Sport in the City of Zhaoqing.
