= Robert Mills (rower) =

Canadian rower (born 1957)

Personal information
- Born: December 9, 1957 (age 68) Halifax, Nova Scotia
- Height: 193 cm (6 ft 4 in)
- Weight: 80 kg (180 lb)

Sport
- Sport: Rowing
Medal record
Men's rowing
Representing Canada
Olympic Games
Bronze medal – third place	1984 Los Angeles	Single sculls
World Championships
Gold medal – first place	1985 Hazewinkel	Quadruple sculls
Bronze medal – third place	1986 Nottingham	Quadruple sculls

Robert Mills (born December 9, 1957) is a Canadian champion rower.

Mills was born in 1957 in Halifax, Nova Scotia. He won a bronze medal in the men's single sculls category at the 1984 Summer Olympics. He won a gold medal at the 1985 World Rowing Championships in men's quadruple sculls, and a bronze medal in the same event at the 1986 World Rowing Championships. He finished ninth in the same category at the 1988 Summer Olympics.
