= Peter Kersten =

German rower (born 1958)

Medal record

Men's rowing

Representing East Germany
Bronze medal – third place	1980 Moskva	Single sculls

Peter Kersten (born 1 February 1958) is a German former rower who competed in the 1980 Summer Olympics.
