= Fabrizio Biondi =

Italian rower (born 1954)

Personal information
- Nationality: Italian
- Born: 7 November 1954 (age 70)

Sport
- Sport: Rowing

Fabrizio Biondi (born 7 November 1954) is an Italian rower. He competed in the men's single sculls event at the 1976 Summer Olympics.
