= John Biglow =

American rower

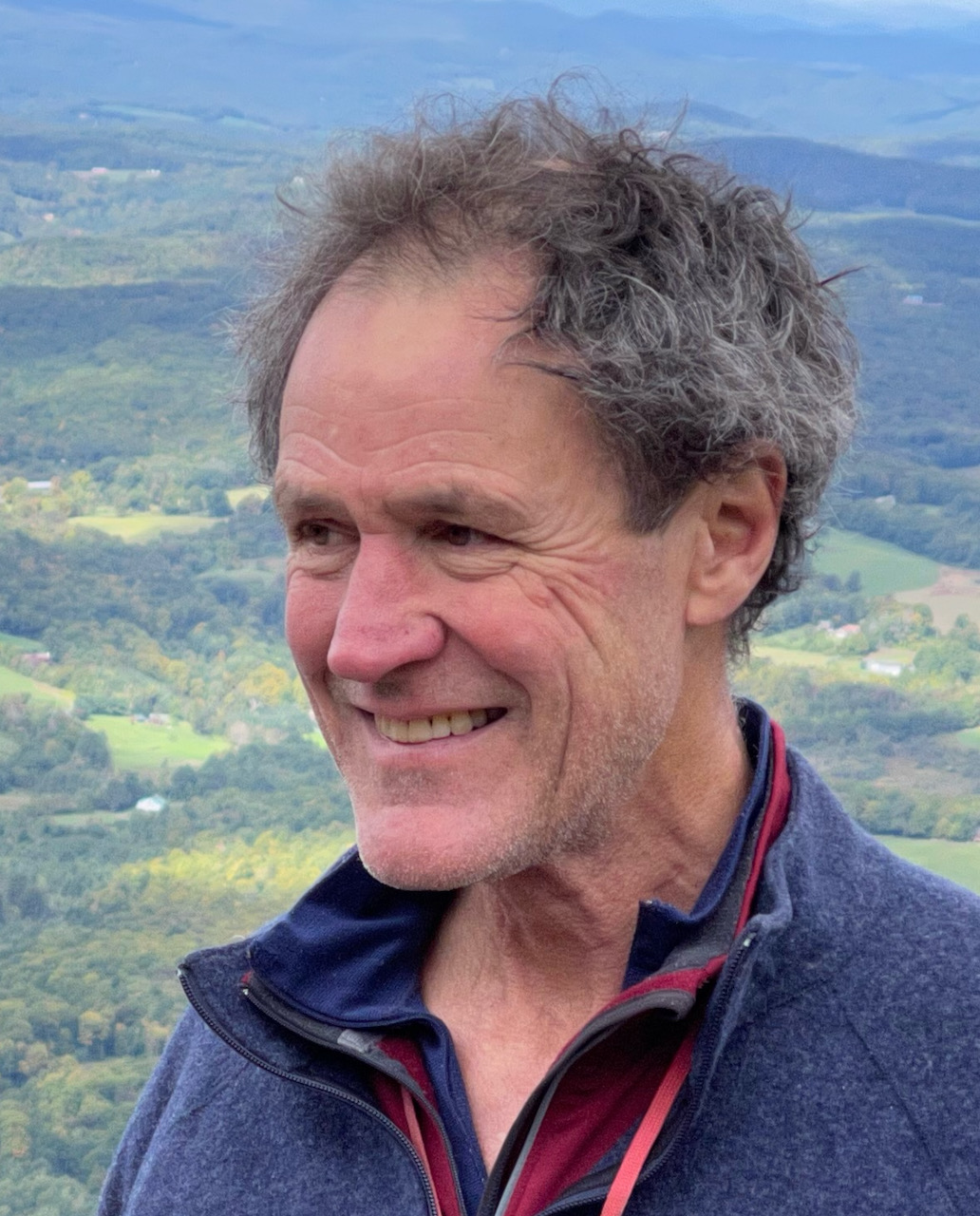
- Biglow in 2022

Personal information
- Born: December 20, 1957 (age 68) Seattle, Washington, United States
- Education: Yale University, Dartmouth Medical School
- Occupation: Anesthesiologist
- Height: 190 cm (6 ft 3 in)
- Weight: 85 kg (187 lb)

Sport
- Sport: Rowing
Medal record
Men's rowing
Representing the United States
World Championships
Bronze medal – third place	1981 Munich	Single sculls
Bronze medal – third place	1982 Lucerne	Single sculls
Pan American Games
Gold medal – first place	1987 Indianapolis	Double sculls

John Biglow (born December 20, 1957) is a retired American rower. Regarded as the best US single sculler of the early 1980s, he competed and finished fourth in the men's single sculls event at the 1984 Summer Olympics in Los Angeles.

== Biography ==
Biglow was born in Seattle after his father, Lucius Horatio, Jr., and mother, Nancy (née Wheatland), moved there from the east coast in 1954. Biglow's grandfather, Lucius Horatio Biglow, was a noted Yale football player.

He started sweep-oar rowing (rowing with a single oar in a boat with teammates), while attending the Lakeside School.

Biglow continued rowing at Yale University. There he contributed to its successes in competing against Harvard University's rowing team, having proved that he was one the strongest oarsmen in the university's history on the ergometer, a stationary rowing machine. He graduated from Yale in 1980 with a degree in psychology.

He graduated as a Doctor of Medicine from Dartmouth Medical School in 1989 and did residencies at Rhode Island Hospital in general medicine and Massachusetts General Hospital in anesthesiology.

After completing his medical training, Biglow became an anesthesiologist, practicing in Delaware and in Vermont.

== Athletic career ==
After his high school and college experience in sweep-oar rowing, Biglow switched to solo sculling (rowing with two oars) in 1981. He was the best US single sculler in the early 1980s. He was noted as powerful finisher, whose muscles allowed increasing output towards the end of a race, whereas other competitors might tire towards the end. A biopsy of his muscles suggested that his ability lay in having 72% slow-twitch muscles, compared with readings in the mid-60-percent range of his peers. His performance was compromised by chronic back pain. Biglow began using a sliding-rigger single scull in 1982, which contributed to his personal best results.

=== Yale crew ===
Biglow rowed in Yale's men's varsity heavyweight boat from 1978 through 1980. In 1978 and 1979 Yale won the Eastern Sprints. The 1979 boat, with Biglow at stroke, raced at the Henley Royal Regatta, triumphing over Oxford.

=== Single sculls ===
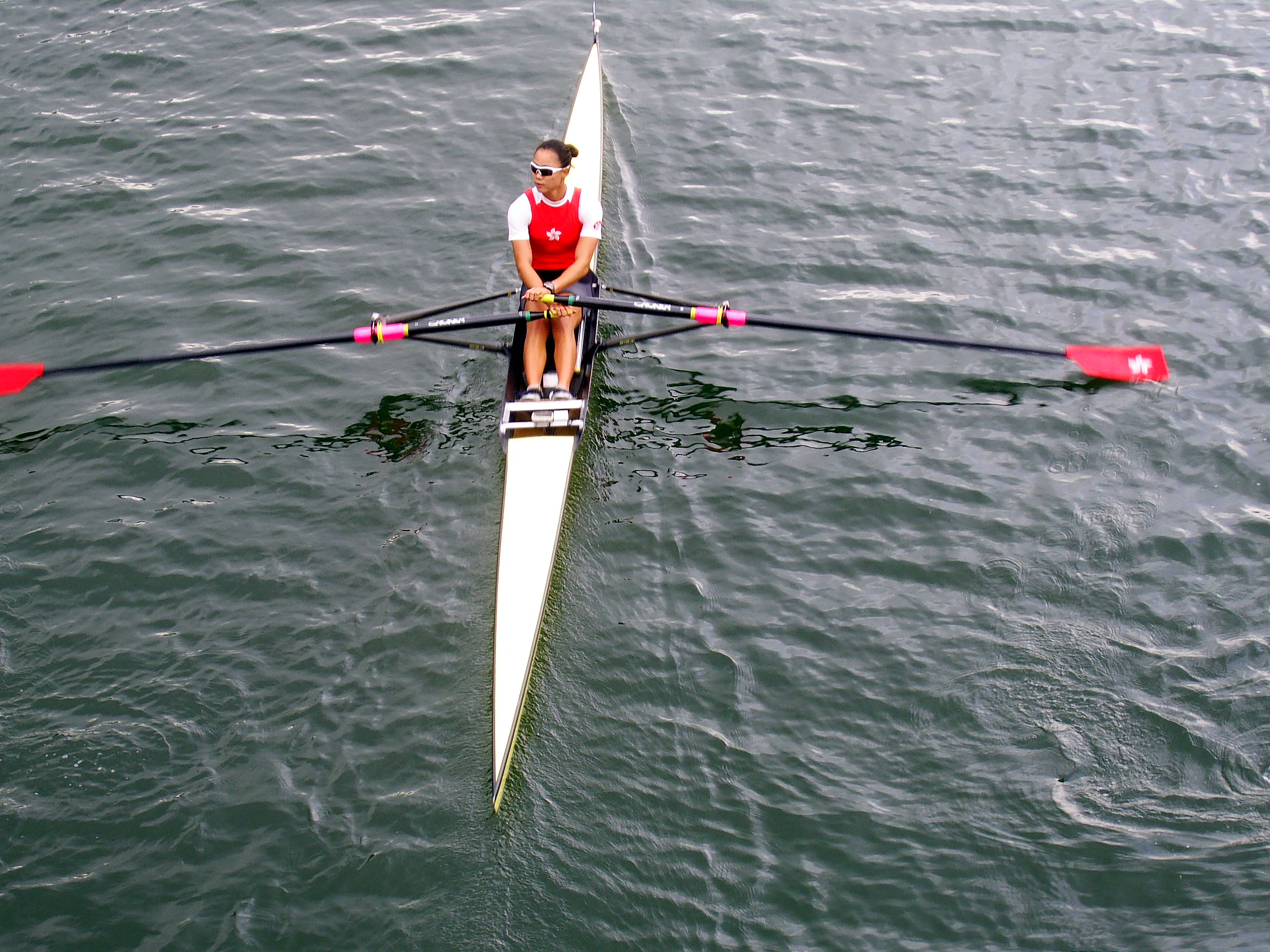
Rower in a single scull

He won bronze medals both at the 1981 and 1982 World Rowing Championships in Lucerne.

In 1982, Biglow held the course record in the Men's Championship Single for the Head of the Charles Regatta until it was bested by Norwegian, Kjetil Borch in 2013.

He raced against former six strong competitors in the May 1984 Olympic trials, winning the final race and a place on the team by 0.9 seconds. He had shown up for Olympic training in Cambridge, Massachusetts without a boat to vie for the position. With some difficulty, he secured a boat and the cooperation of the coach. He placed well in other qualifying races and raced at Olympic camp in California against his international competition, which had arrived for the games. Feeling that his leg strength was less than a few years before and that his back was an issue, Biglow decided to repeat his usual strategy of rowing his own race—not responding unnecessarily to the progress of his competitors. Vying for a bronze medal, he came in fourth against a strong field, missing the medal by 1.62 seconds after a strong finish surge.

=== Double and quadruple sculls ===
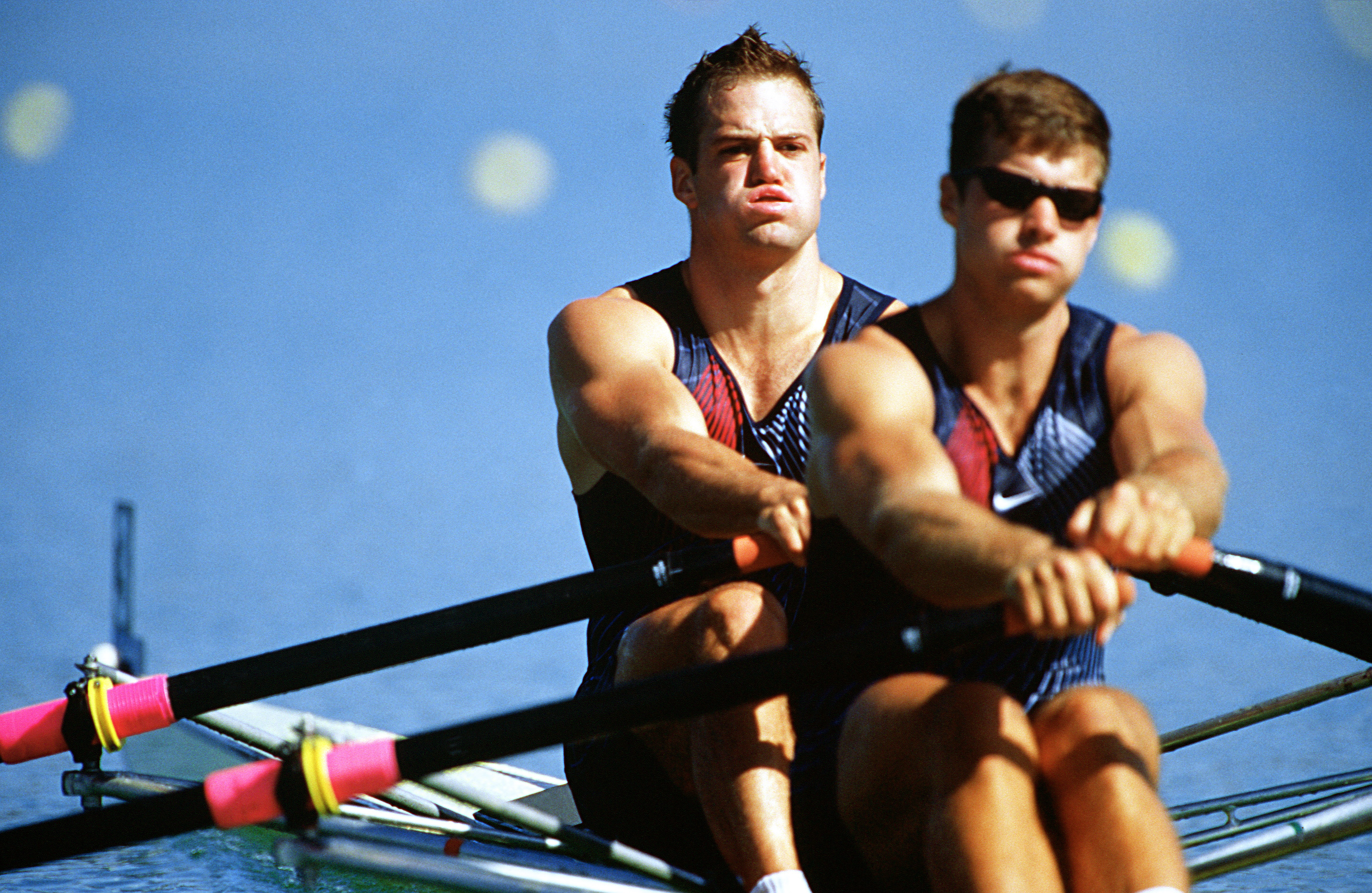
Rowers in a double scull

Biglow also competed at the 1983 World Championships in quadruple sculls and at the 1985 championships in double sculls.

He won a gold medal in double sculls with Greg Walker at the 1987 Pan American Games.

=== International race results ===
The World Rowing Federation summarizes Biglow's international race results, as follows:

Event	Locale	Team	Race	Rank	Time
1981 World Rowing Championships	Oberschleissheim/Munich, Germany	USA	Men's Single Sculls (FA)	3	07:51.55
1982 World Rowing Championships	Rotsee/Lucerne, Switzerland	USA	Men's Single Sculls (FA)	3	07:02.08
1983 World Rowing Championships	Wedau/Duisburg, Germany	USA	Men's Quadruple Sculls (FB)	1	05:57.93
1984 Olympic Games	Lake Casitas/Los Angeles, United States	USA	Men's Single Sculls (F)	4	07:12.00

== Portrayals ==
A 1984 Time survey of prospective Olympic athletes highlighted Biglow as a self-motivated, non-sponsored amateur athlete, devoted to his sport and the honor of competing against the world's best rowers.

David Halberstam wrote about Biglow in a Vanity Fair article, "Striver's Row", and a book, The Amateurs.

The magazine article, with two portraits by Annie Liebowitz, provides background on Biglow's Yale rowing career and the events leading to his 1984 Olympic performance. Much of the material is reprised in the book.

The book describes, in part, Biglow's development as an oarsman. Halberstam highlights the personal and team dynamics that led up to Biglow's rowing event in the 1984 Summer Olympics, which included overcoming back pain, finding a suitable race boat, convincing his rowing coach that he should race as a single, and his status compared with other rowers. The book portrays him as having an ethos that included a strong drive to excel, combined with personal modesty, and a strong sense that the dignity of his fellow competitors should be respected and upheld. The book explored the nature of amateur sports, wherein athletes are motivated not by money, but the will to excel.

He was portrayed in the movie, Rowing Through, a film adaptation of Halberstam's book.

Peter Mallory captured substantial reminiscences in dialog form from Biglow and his contemporaries in The Sport of Rowing: Plus ça change.
