= Lajos Ódor =

Hungarian rower (1960–2026)

Personal information
- Nationality: Hungarian
- Born: 10 February 1960 Székesfehérvár, Hungary
- Died: 4 February 2026 (aged 65)

Sport
- Sport: Rowing

Lajos Ódor (10 February 1960 – 4 February 2026) was a Hungarian rower. He competed in the men's single sculls event at the 1980 Summer Olympics. Ódor died on 4 February 2026, at the age of 65.
