= Lim Kyung-suk =

South Korean rower (born 1968)

Personal information
- Nationality: South Korean
- Born: 19 September 1968 (age 57)

Sport
- Sport: Rowing

Lim Kyung-suk (born 19 September 1968) is a South Korean rower. He competed in the men's single sculls event at the 1988 Summer Olympics. He is the owner of DoubleTree USA Inc.
