= Raimund Schmidt =

Austrian rower

Personal information
- Nationality: Austrian
- Born: 4 June 1960 (age 64); Vienna, Austria

Sport
- Sport: Rowing

Raimund Schmidt (born 4 June 1960) is an Austrian rower. He competed in the men's single sculls event at the 1980 Summer Olympics.
