= Jim Dietz (rower) =

American rower and rowing coach

Personal information
- Born: James William Dietz; January 12, 1949 (age 77) The Bronx, New York, U.S.
- Education: Northeastern University
- Occupation: Rowing coach
- Years active: 1996–present

Sport
- Sport: Rowing
Medal record
Men's rowing
Representing the United States
World Junior Championships
Gold medal – first place	1967 Ratzeburg	Single sculls
World Championships
Silver medal – second place	1974 Lucerne	Single sculls
Pan American Games
Gold medal – first place	1967 Winnipeg	Double sculls
Silver medal – second place	1975 Mexico City	Single sculls
Silver medal – second place	1983 Caracas	Double sculls
Bronze medal – third place	1979 San Juan	Single sculls

James William Dietz (born January 12, 1949) is an American rower and rowing coach.

Dietz was born in 1949 in The Bronx. He obtained his education at Northeastern University, from where he graduated in 1972.

Dietz had a very long rowing career, lasting from 1967 (when he won gold at the 1967 World Rowing Junior Championships in Ratzeburg in single sculls) until he retired from competitive rowing in 1983. He started at Pan American Games in 1967, 1975, 1979, and 1983. He competed in single sculls at the 1971 European Rowing Championships (sixth place) and again two years later in 1973 (eleventh). He competed at World Rowing Championships in 1970, 1974, 1975, and in 1979.

He competed at the 1972 Summer Olympics in Munich in the single sculls and came fifth. He went to the 1976 Summer Olympics in Montreal and came seventh in the single sculls. He made the team for the 1980 Summer Olympics but did not travel to Moscow due to the boycott initiated by the United States.

Dietz later worked as a rowing coach, including for US national teams. He was the head coach of the University of Massachusetts women’s rowing team from 1996 to 2019. The Minutewomen have dominated regular-season racing and captured 16 Atlantic 10 Championships under Dietz's direction. His squads have produced 69 Atlantic 10 gold medals in 12 separate league championship events, including 13 by his Varsity 8+ boats. For his efforts, Dietz has been honored as Atlantic 10 Conference Coach of the Year a league-record 10 occasions, including during three of the last four campaigns.
