= Walter Lambertus =

Romanian rower (1955–2019)

Personal information
- Nationality: Romanian
- Born: 14 August 1955
- Died: 21 March 2019 (aged 63)

Sport
- Sport: Rowing

Walter Lambertus (14 August 1955 – 21 March 2019) was a Romanian rower. He competed in the men's single sculls event at the 1976 Summer Olympics. Lambertus sought asylum in Canada during the 1976 Summer Olympics.
