= Raimund Haberl =

Austrian rower

Personal information
- Nationality: Austrian
- Born: 29 August 1949 (age 75); Zistersdorf, Austria

Sport
- Sport: Rowing

Raimund Haberl (born 29 August 1949) is an Austrian rower. He competed in the men's single sculls event at the 1984 Summer Olympics.
