= Reinaldo Kutscher =

Uruguayan rower

Personal information
- Born: 8 April 1947 (age 79) Uruguay
- Height: 185 cm (6 ft 1 in)
- Weight: 89 kg (196 lb)

Sport
- Country: Uruguay
- Sport: Rowing

Achievements and titles
- Personal best: 66.90

Reinalod Kutscher Meier is a Uruguayan former Olympic rower. He represented his country in the men's single sculls at the 1976 Summer Olympics. His time was a 7:48.59 in the qualifiers.
