= Pertti Karppinen =

Finnish rower

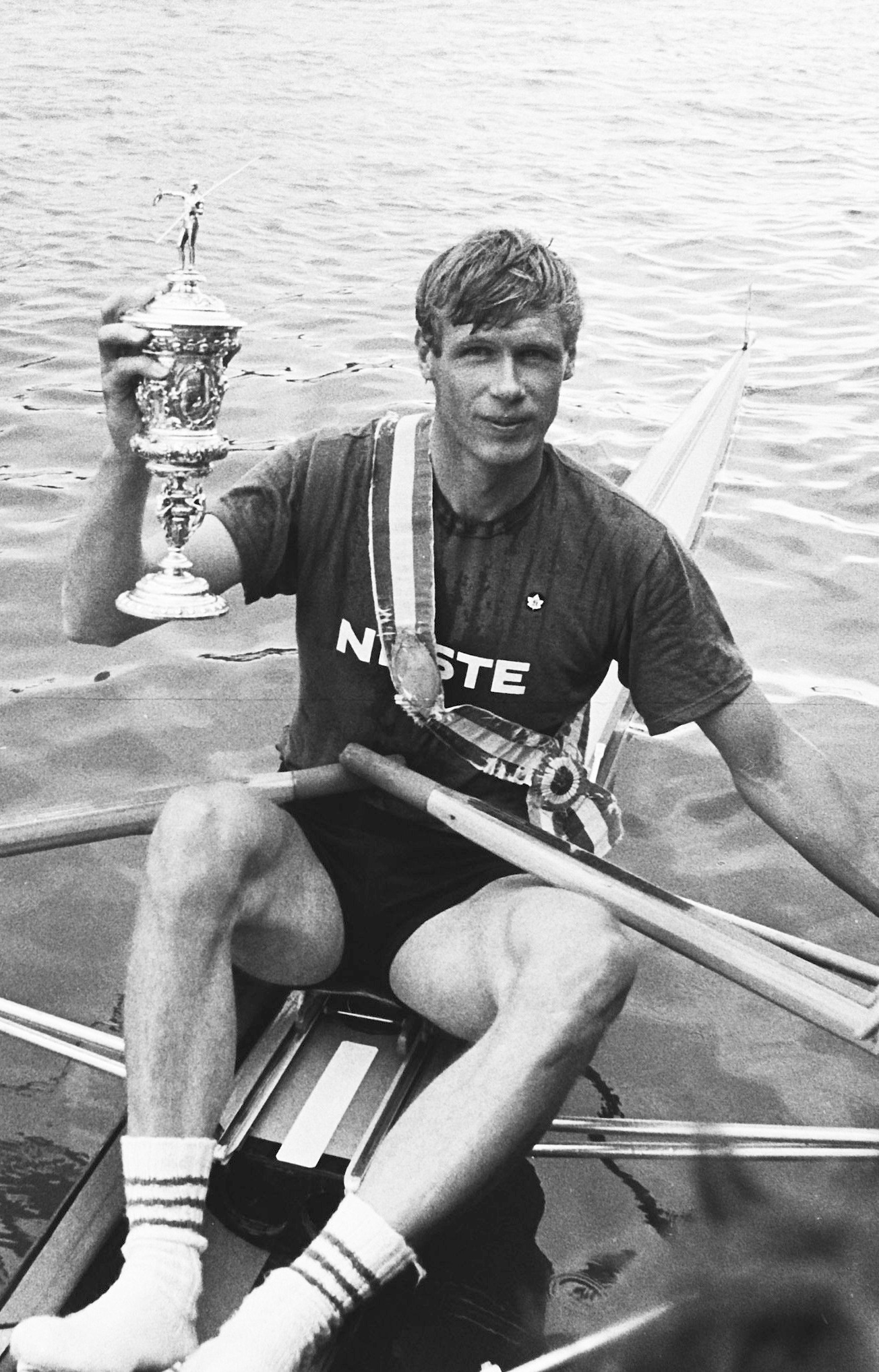
- Karppinen in 1980

Personal information
- Full name: Pertti Johannes Karppinen
- Born: 17 February 1953 (age 73) Askainen, Finland
- Height: 201 cm (6 ft 7 in)
- Weight: 98–102 kg (216–225 lb)

Sport
- Sport: Rowing
- Club: Nesteen Soutajat, Naantali
Medal record
Men's rowing
Representing Finland
Olympic Games
Gold medal – first place	1976 Montreal	Single sculls
Gold medal – first place	1980 Moscow	Single sculls
Gold medal – first place	1984 Los Angeles	Single sculls
World Rowing Championships
Gold medal – first place	1979 Bled	Single sculls
Gold medal – first place	1985 Hazewinkel	Single sculls
Silver medal – second place	1977 Amsterdam	Single sculls
Silver medal – second place	1981 Munich	Double sculls
Silver medal – second place	1986 Nottingham	Single sculls
Bronze medal – third place	1987 Copenhagen	Single sculls

Pertti Johannes Karppinen (born 17 February 1953) is a retired Finnish rower noted for his three consecutive Olympic gold medals in single sculls in 1976, 1980 and 1984.

== Biography ==
Karppinen won the world titles in 1979 and 1985 and once held the world record in indoor rowing. His style was to row a steady race and finish with a devastating sprint. In the early portions of the race, he would often trail his rivals by several boat length, only to catch them at the race finish.

Karppinen and great German sculler Peter-Michael Kolbe had one of the greatest rivalries in the history of the sport. Although Kolbe has more Olympic and World Championship medals than any other single sculler in history, he never won an Olympic gold medal. Twice, in 1976 and 1984, Kolbe had the lead the entire race, only to be passed in the last few meters of the race by Karppinen. Kolbe and Karppinen did not face each other in the 1980 Games because West Germany chose to boycott the games to protest the Soviet Union's invasion of Afghanistan.

Karppinen and Kolbe faced each other one last time at the 1988 Summer Olympics. Karppinen missed making the finals, but won the consolation race for seventh place. Kolbe again won a silver medal being beaten by prodigy Thomas Lange. Karppinen would go on to compete in the 1992 Summer Olympics finishing in tenth place.

Karppinen and Russia's Vyacheslav Ivanov are the only men to win gold medals in the single scull at three straight Olympics. Besides single sculls, Karppinen also rowed doubles with his younger brother Reima and won a silver medal at the 1981 World Rowing Championships. Currently Karppinen works as a national rowing coach, and also trains his son Juho, and daughter Eeva, who both compete in rowing at the international level.

== See also ==
- Athletes with most gold medals in one event at the Olympic Games
