= Edgar Nanne =

Guatemalan rower (born 1952)

Personal information
- Nationality: Guatemalan
- Born: 22 November 1952 (age 72)

Sport
- Sport: Rowing

Edgar Nanne (born 22 November 1952) is a Guatemalan rower. He competed at the 1980 Summer Olympics and the 1984 Summer Olympics.
