= Ulli Wolf =

Austrian rower

Personal information
- Nationality: Austrian
- Born: 28 February 1949 (age 76); Villach, Austria

Sport
- Sport: Rowing

Ulli Wolf (born 28 February 1949) is an Austrian rower. He competed at the 1972 Summer Olympics and the 1976 Summer Olympics.
