= Fredrik Hultén =

Swedish rower

Personal information
- Nationality: Swedish
- Born: 9 November 1966; Lund, Sweden
- Died: 13 June 1997 (aged 30); Strömstad, Sweden

Sport
- Sport: Rowing

Fredrik Hultén (9 November 1966 – 13 June 1997) was a Swedish rower. He competed at the 1988 Summer Olympics, 1992 Summer Olympics, and the 1996 Summer Olympics. He died in a car accident.
