= Peter-Michael Kolbe =

German rower (1953–2023)

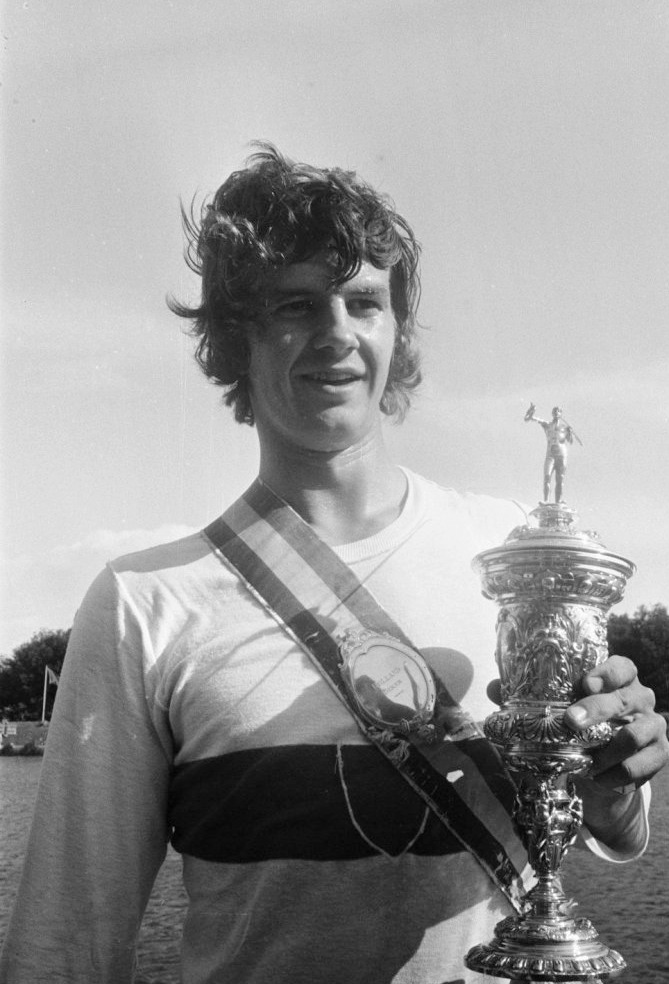
- Kolbe in 1975

Personal information
- Born: 2 August 1953 Hamburg, West Germany
- Died: 8 December 2023 (aged 70) Lübeck, Schleswig-Holstein, Germany
- Height: 1.94 m (6 ft 4 in)
- Weight: 84 kg (185 lb)

Sport
- Sport: Rowing
- Club: Ruderclub Hamburg
Medal record
Men's rowing
Representing West Germany
Olympic Games
Silver medal – second place	1976 Montreal	Single sculls
Silver medal – second place	1984 Los Angeles	Single sculls
Silver medal – second place	1988 Seoul	Single sculls
World Rowing Championships
Gold medal – first place	1975 Nottingham	Single sculls
Gold medal – first place	1978 Karapiro	Single sculls
Gold medal – first place	1981 Munich	Single sculls
Gold medal – first place	1983 Duisburg	Single sculls
Gold medal – first place	1986 Nottingham	Single sculls
Silver medal – second place	1979 Bled	Single sculls
Silver medal – second place	1987 Copenhagen	Single sculls
Bronze medal – third place	1974 Lucerne	Coxed four
Bronze medal – third place	1985 Hazewinkel	Single sculls
European Rowing Championships
Gold medal – first place	1973 Moscow	Single sculls

Peter-Michael Kolbe (German pronunciation: [ˈpeːtɐ ˈmɪçaʔeːl ˈkɔlbə]; 2 August 1953 – 8 December 2023) was a German rower who specialized in the single sculls. In this event, between 1975 and 1988 he won five world titles and three Olympic silver medals, in 1976, 1984, and 1988; he missed the 1980 Games because of their boycott by West Germany. His career is known for the rivalry with Pertti Karppinen that stretched for 14 years.

== Biography ==
At the 1974 World Rowing Championships in Lucerne, Kolbe won bronze with the coxed four. In 1975, he won his first World Rowing Championship in the single scull. He was named West German Sportsman of the year for this achievement. He went into the 1976 Olympics as the favorite. On the day of the Olympic finals, the wind was fierce and the course difficult. Kolbe led the entire race only to be passed in the closing moments by Karppinen who had trailed badly during the early portions of the race. Kolbe's reward was a silver medal.

West Germany boycotted the 1980 Summer Olympics to protest the Soviet Union's invasion of Afghanistan. Kolbe left the single scull and rowed in the West German national eight (8+), which raced in several European events. His rival Karppinen won the gold medal at the Olympics.

In 1982, Kolbe moved to Oslo to be with his Norwegian wife, a journalist whom he met at the 1975 World Championships.

At the 1984 Olympics, Kolbe faced his rival Karppinen once again. Kolbe fought for and got the lead early in the race. He slowly began pulling away from the other rowers. Karppinen languished far back. Over the last thousand meters of the race, Kolbe continued to pull away from the pack, but Karppinen was inching his way back into the race. In the last 150 meters of the race, Karppinen caught an exhausted Kolbe and went on to win his third gold medal.

In both the 1976 and 1984 Olympics, Karppinen and Kolbe separated themselves from the pack turning a multi-boat race into a two boat match. They were the two best scullers in the world. They raced each other many other times and their races were well rowed and hard fought. Unlike the Olympics, Kolbe, more often than not, beat his rival at the World Championships.

In 1987, Kolbe won the Diamond Challenge Sculls (the premier singles sculls event) at the Henley Royal Regatta, rowing for the RC Hamburg.

At the 1988 Olympics, Kolbe finally beat Karppinen at the Olympics, but there was a new sculling sensation. Thomas Lange won the race with Kolbe again getting silver, and Karppinen not even making the finals. Kolbe was consistently fast. In all Kolbe's Olympic and World Championship races, only Karppinen, Lange and Andrew Sudduth were ever able to beat Kolbe in a regularly rigged boat.

He later returned to Germany and in 1994 became director of the German Rowing Federation.

In July 2016, Kolbe was inducted into Germany's Sports Hall of Fame.

Kolbe died on 8 December 2023, at the age of 70.

Awards
Preceded by (Germany) Klaus Wolfermann	German Sportsman of the Year; 1975	Succeeded by (Germany) Gregor Braun
