= Federico Scheffler =

Mexican rower (born 1950)

Personal information
- Nationality: Mexican
- Born: 2 March 1950 (age 75)

Sport
- Sport: Rowing

Federico Scheffler (born 2 March 1950) is a Mexican rower. He competed at the 1972 Summer Olympics and the 1976 Summer Olympics.
