= José Ramón Oyarzábal =

Spanish rower

Personal information
- Full name: José Ramón Oyarzábal Uranga
- Nationality: Spanish
- Born: 7 January 1957 (age 68); Iturriotz (Oiartzun), Guipúzcoa, Spain
- Height: 190 cm (6 ft 3 in)
- Weight: 87 kg (192 lb)

Sport
- Sport: Rowing

José Ramón Oyarzábal Uranga (born 7 January 1957) is a Spanish rower. He competed at the 1980 Summer Olympics, 1984 Summer Olympics and the 1988 Summer Olympics.

He has also participated in several World Rowing Championships. He finished in sixth place in Munich in 1981, fourth place in 1982 in Lucerne; sixth place in 1983 in Duisburg (RFA) all of them in the two (without coxed) together with Luis Mari Lasurtegui. In 1985 he finished 11th in the four without coxed in Hazewinkel (Belgium) and in 1986 ninth in Nottingham (United Kingdom).

He was responsible for the technical improvement rowing center in Legutiano for 16 years, from its opening (1988) to 2003 (two years before its closure). Later he has collaborated in preparatory work in clubs such as the Arraun Lagunak in Donostia-San Sebastián and in Hondarribia.
