= Gordon Henry (rower) =

Canadian rower

Personal information
- Born: 21 June 1954 (age 72) Summerside, Prince Edward Island, Canada

Sport
- Sport: Rowing

Gordon Henry (born 21 June 1954) is a Canadian rower. He competed in two events at the 1988 Summer Olympics.
