= Denis Gaté =

French rower

Personal information
- Nationality: French
- Born: 5 March 1958 (age 67)

Sport
- Sport: Rowing

Denis Gaté (born 5 March 1958) is a French rower. He competed at the 1980 Summer Olympics and the 1984 Summer Olympics.
