= Hamish McGlashan =

Australian rower

Hamish McGlashan (born 17 December 1963, in Melbourne, Australia) is an Australian former representative rower. He finished fourth in the single sculls at the 1988 Summer Olympics in Seoul, South Korea. In the same year, he won the Diamond Challenge Sculls (the premier singles sculls event) at the Henley Royal Regatta.

== Club rowing ==
McGlashan's senior club rowing was from the Melbourne University Boat Club.

In 1987 and 1988 at the Australian Rowing Championships McGlashan won back-to-back national titles in the men's quad scull rowing with Peter Antonie, Paul Reedy and Gary Gullock.

== International representative rowing ==
McGlashan's first Australian representative appearance came in 1987 when he was selected in the Australian men's eight to race at the 1987 World Rowing Championships in Copenhagen. That crew made the A final and finished in fourth place. The following year McGlashan made Australian Olympic selection and rowed in the single scull at the 1988 Seoul Olympics. Again he placed fourth.

After a two-year break from national selection squads he secured a seat in the Australian men's quad scull for the 1991 World Rowing Championships in Vienna. That crew finished last in the B final for an overall twelfth place.
