= Bernard Destraz =

Swiss rower

Personal information
- Nationality: Swiss
- Born: 25 May 1955 (age 69)

Sport
- Sport: Rowing

Bernard Destraz (born 25 May 1955) is a Swiss rower. He competed in the men's single sculls event at the 1980 Summer Olympics.
