= Philippine Rowing Association =

Governing body for rowing in the Philippines

- Sport: Rowing
- Abbreviation: PRA
- Affiliation: International Rowing Federation
- Regional affiliation: Asian Rowing Federation
- Headquarters: Quezon City
- President: John Patrick Gregorio
- Secretary: Benedicto Membrere
- (Philippines)

The Philippine Rowing Association is the national governing body for rowing in the Philippines. It is accredited by the Fédération Internationale des Sociétés d'Aviron (FISA) or International Rowing Federation which is the governing body for the sport of rowing in the world.

Philippine Rowing opened a regional hub in Cauayan, Isabela in July 2026, establishing a training center for national athletes.
