= Didier Gallet =

French rower

Personal information
- Nationality: French
- Born: 14 August 1945 (age 79)

Sport
- Sport: Rowing

Didier Gallet (born 14 August 1945) is a French rower. He competed in two events at the 1980 Summer Olympics.
