= Ricardo Ibarra =

Argentine rower

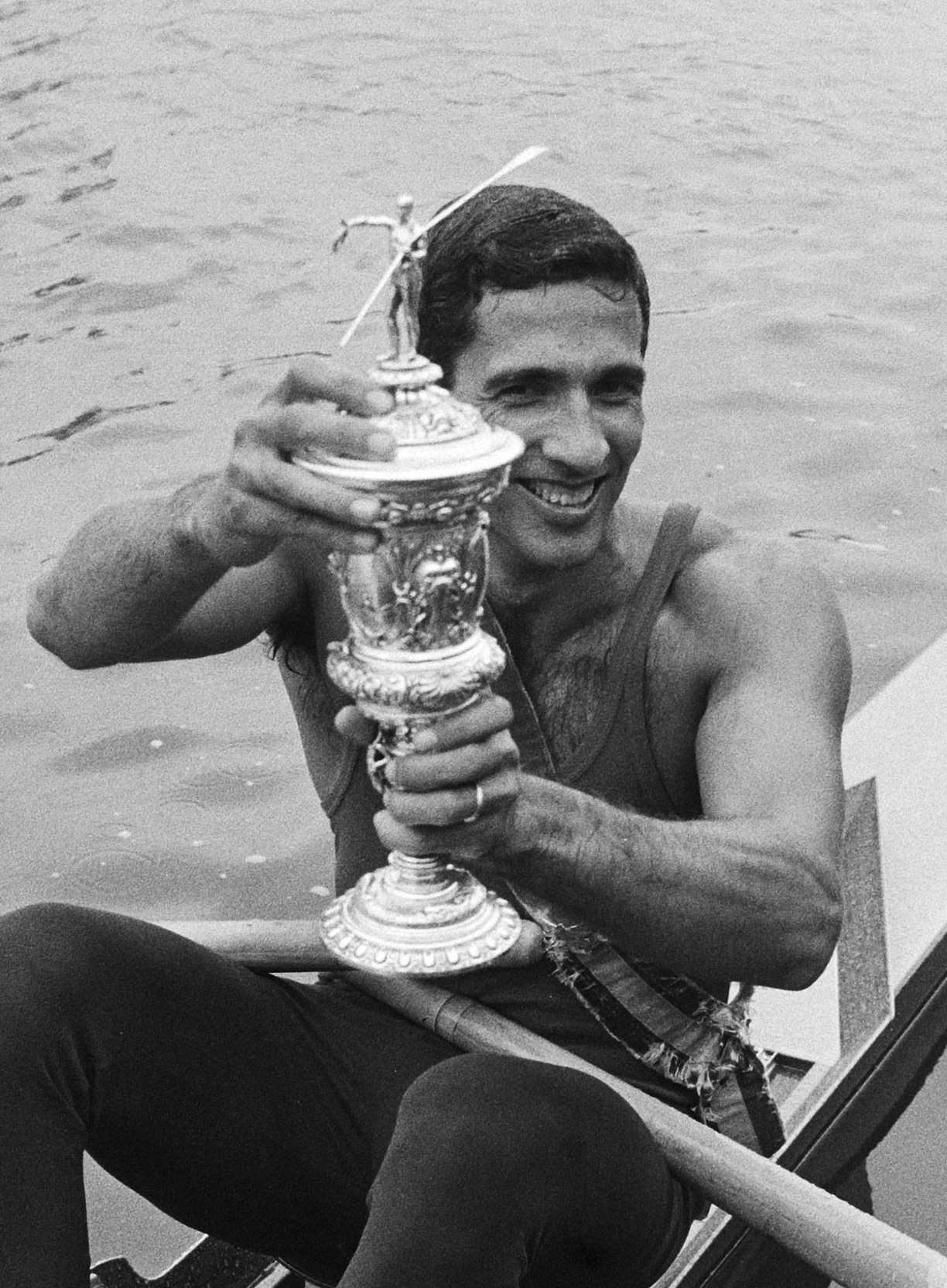
- Ricardo Ibarra in 1981

Personal information
- Full name: Ricardo Daniel Ibarra
- Born: 28 August 1950 Buenos Aires, Argentina
- Died: 15 December 2011 (aged 61)

Sport
- Sport: Rowing
- Club: Mar del Plata
Medal record
Representing Argentina
Pan American Games
Gold medal – first place	1975 Mexico City	Single sculls
Gold medal – first place	1979 San Juan	Single sculls
Gold medal – first place	1983 Caracas	Single sculls

Ricardo Daniel Ibarra (28 August 1950 – 15 December 2011) was an Argentine rower. He competed at the 1972, 1976 and 1984 Summer Olympics in single and double scull events.

== Biography ==
Ibarra competed at three Olympic Games with a best result of fifth place in the single sculls in 1984. He won this event at three consecutive Pan American Games, in 1975, 1979 and 1983.

Ibarra was the flag bearer for Argentina at the 1984 Olympic Opening Ceremony and won the Olimpia Award eight times in the rowing category.

In 1980, Ibarra won the Diamond Challenge Sculls (the premier singles sculls event) at the Henley Royal Regatta, rowing for the Mar del Plata.

After retiring from competitions he coached the national rowing team while working at the International Rowing Federation as a consultant for Latin America. Ibarra was married to his schoolmate Nora, they had two sons.
