= Hans Svensson =

Swedish rower

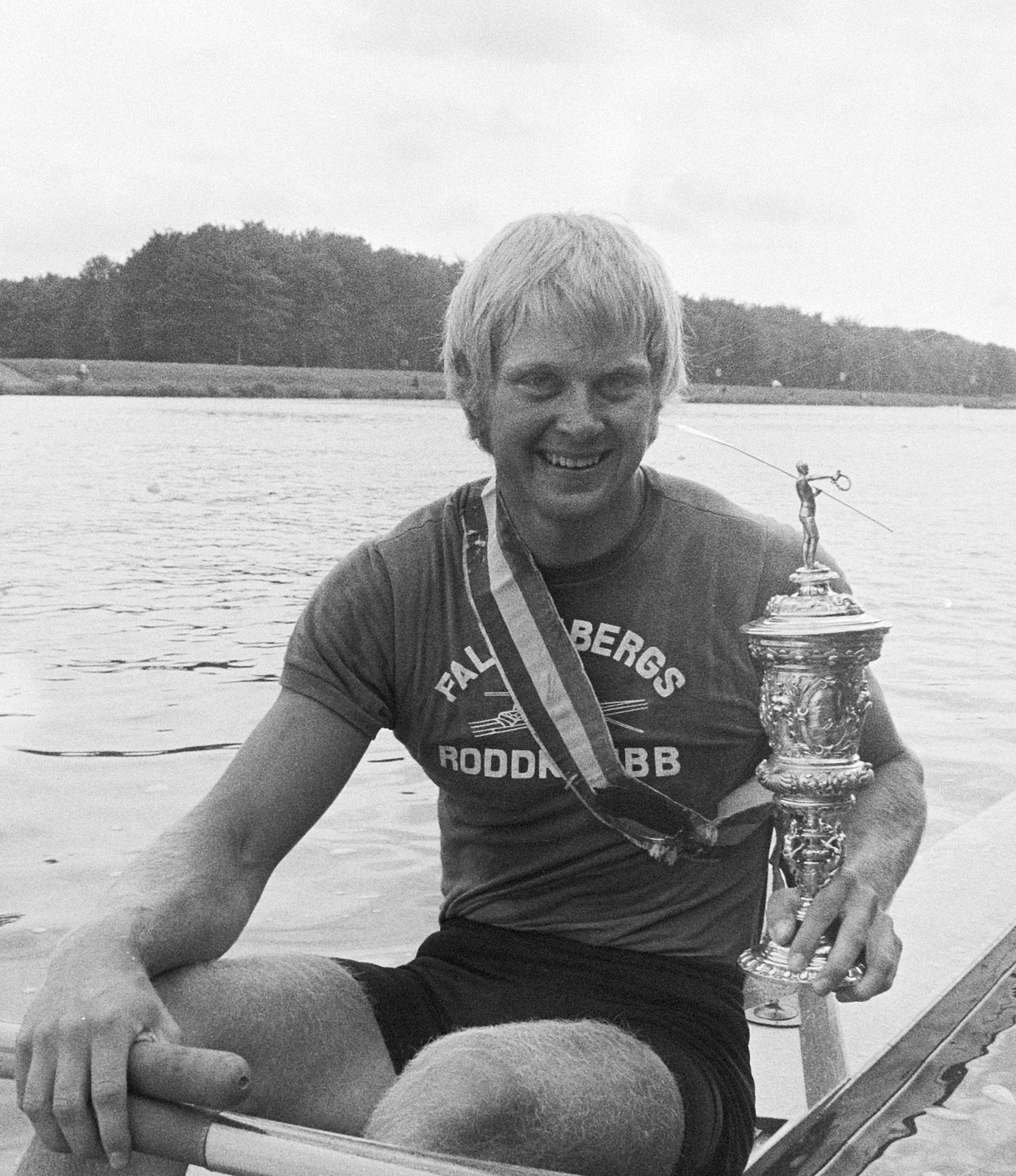
- Hans Svensson in 1977

Personal information
- Born: 30 July 1955 (age 71) Falkenberg, Sweden
- Height: 1.99 m (6 ft 6 in)
- Weight: 103 kg (227 lb)

Sport
- Sport: Rowing
- Club: Falkenbergs RK
Medal record
Representing Sweden
World Rowing Championships
Bronze medal – third place	1983 Duisburg	Coxless fours

Hans Erik Ingemar "Hasse" Svensson (born 30 July 1955) is a retired Swedish rower and pulse enthusiast who won a bronze medal in the coxless fours at the 1983 World Rowing Championships. He competed at the 1976 and 1980 Summer Olympics in the single sculls and finished in ninth and fifth place, respectively. At the 1984 Games he joined the Swedish coxless fours team and finished sixth. After retiring from competitions he worked as a coach, particularly with Martin Feuk. His father Ingemar rowed at the 1952 Games.

Hans currently resides in Lake Oswego, Oregon as the head Varsity coach for LOCR (Lake Oswego Community Rowing).

Olympic Games
Preceded by Stig Pettersson	Flagbearer for Sweden; Los Angeles 1984	Succeeded by Agneta Andersson
