= Juan Félix =

Puerto Rican rower (born 1959)

Personal information
- Nationality: Puerto Rican
- Born: 9 February 1959 (age 66)

Sport
- Sport: Rowing

Juan Félix (born 9 February 1959) is a Puerto Rican rower. He competed at the 1984 Summer Olympics and the 1988 Summer Olympics.
