= Gary Reid =

New Zealand rower

Personal information
- Nationality: New Zealand
- Born: Gary Frances Reid; 31 October 1960 (age 66) Whakatāne, New Zealand
- Height: 188 cm (6 ft 2 in)
- Weight: 90 kg (198 lb)

Gary Frances Reid (born 31 October 1960) is a New Zealand rower.

Reid was born in 1960 in Whakatāne, New Zealand. He represented New Zealand at the 1984 Summer Olympics. He is listed as New Zealand Olympian athlete number 491 by the New Zealand Olympic Committee.
