= Kostas Kontomanolis =

Greek rower (born 1957)

Konstantinos Kontomanolis
Personal information
- Nationality: Greek
- Born: 25 August 1957 (age 68)

Sport
- Sport: Rowing

Konstantinos Kontomanolis (Κωνσταντίνος "Κώστας" Κοντομανώλης, born 25 August 1957) is a Greek rower. He competed at the 1980 Summer Olympics and the 1984 Summer Olympics.
