= Delestre =

Delestre is a surname. Notable people with the surname include:

- Charles-Gaspard Delestre-Poirson (1790–1859), French playwright and theatre director
- Dominique Delestre (born 1955), French racing driver
- Jean-Baptiste Delestre (1800–1871), French artist and writer
- Simon Delestre (born 1981), French equestrian

== See also ==
- Deletraz
