= Rowing at the 1972 Summer Olympics – Men's double sculls =

Men's double sculls at the Games of the XX Olympiad
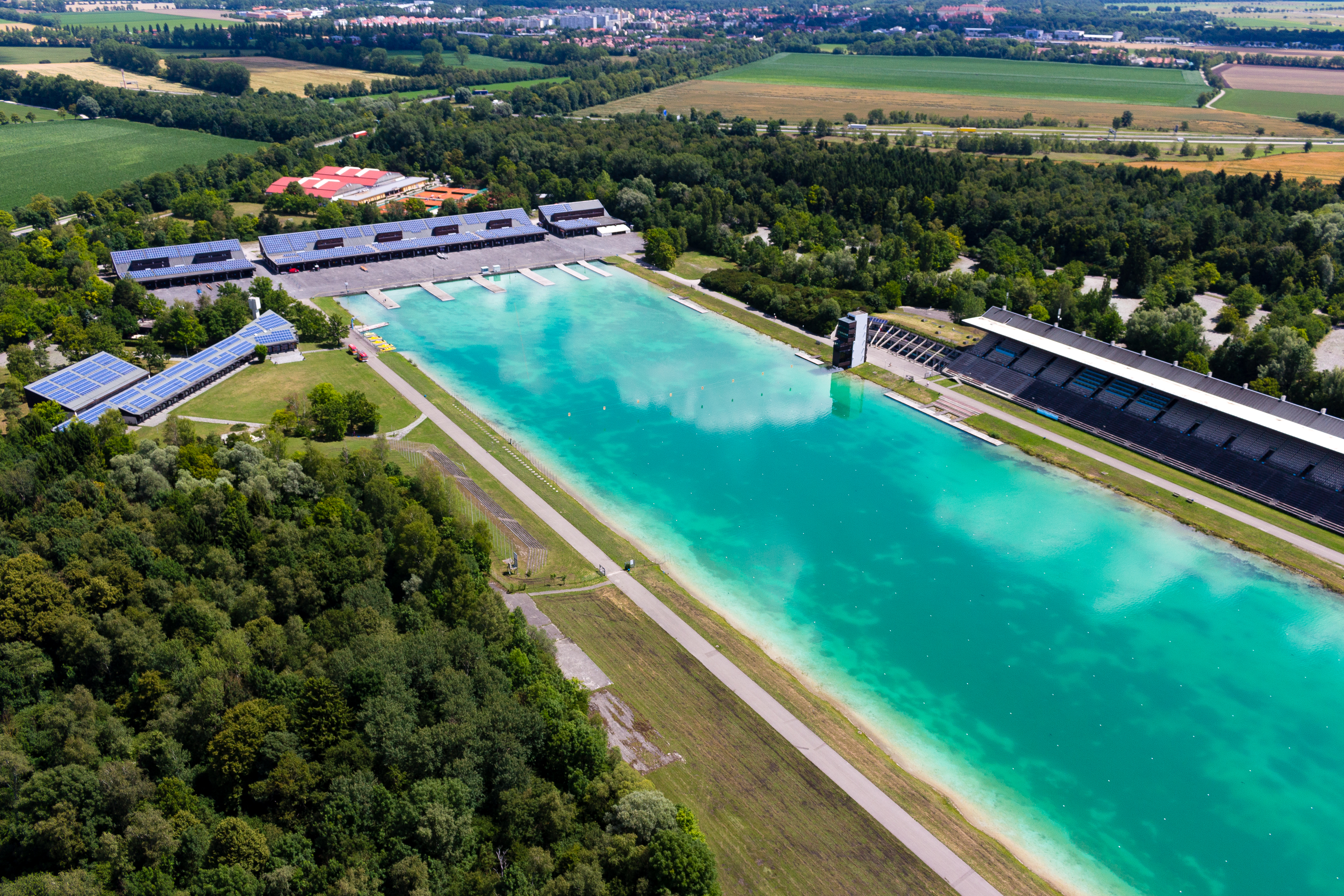
- Aerial view of the venue in Oberschleißheim
- Venue: Oberschleißheim Regatta Course
- Date: 27 August – 2 September 1972
- Competitors: 38; (19 teams) from 19 nations
- Winning time: 7:01.77

Medalists
1st place, gold medalist(s)		Aleksandr Timoshinin; Gennadi Korshikov	Soviet Union
2nd place, silver medalist(s)		Frank Hansen; Svein Thøgersen	Norway
3rd place, bronze medalist(s)		Joachim Böhmer; Uli Schmied	East Germany

The men's double sculls competition at the 1972 Summer Olympics in Munich took place from 27 August – 2 September at the Olympic Reggatta Course in Oberschleißheim.

== Results ==
=== Heats ===
Winner of each heat (green) qualify to the semifinal round, remainder goes to the repechage.

==== Heat 1 ====
Rank	Rower	Country	Time
1	Tim Crooks; Patrick Delafield	Great Britain	6:57.70
2	Joachim Böhmer; Uli Schmied	East Germany	7:07.94
3	Albert Heyche; Claude Dehombreux	Belgium	7:16.69
4	Jorge Imaz; Ricardo Ibarra	Argentina	7:18.28
5	Peter Barr; John McNiven	Canada	7:21.69

==== Heat 2 ====
Rank	Rower	Country	Time
1	Josef Straka, Jr. Vladek Lacina	Czechoslovakia	6:56.82
2	Hans Ruckstuhl; Ueli Isler	Switzerland	7:02.90
3	Frank Hansen; Svein Thøgersen	Norway	7:03.65
4	Thomas McKibbon; John Van Blom	United States	7:08.91
5	Roman Kowalewski; Kazimierz Lewandowski	Poland	7:21.05

==== Heat 3 ====
Rank	Rower	Country	Time
1	Aleksandr Timoshinin; Gennadi Korshikov	Soviet Union	6:56.17
2	Jan Bruyn; Paul Veenemans	Netherlands	7:02.12
3	Jochen Meißner; Arthur Heyne	West Germany	7:12.03
4	Tsugio Ito; Yoshio Minato	Japan	7:17.51
5	Federico Scheffler; Ricardo Scheffler	Mexico	7:43.87

==== Heat 4 ====
Rank	Rower	Country	Time
1	Niels Henry Secher; Jørgen Engelbrecht	Denmark	7:11.32
2	Jean-Noël Ribot; Roland Thibaut	France	7:16.50
3	Manfred Krausbar; Sepp Puchinger	Austria	7:29.13
4	Carlos Oliveira; Manuel Barroso	Portugal	8:09.93

=== Repechage ===
Top two finishers in each heat qualify to the semifinal round.

==== Repechage 1 ====
Rank	Rower	Country	Time
1	Jean-Noël Ribot; Roland Thibaut	France	7:10.45
2	Jochen Meißner; Arthur Heyne	West Germany	7:11.55
3	Thomas McKibbon; John Van Blom	United States	7:19.63
4	Peter Barr; John McNiven	Canada	7:29.05

==== Repechage 2 ====
Rank	Rower	Country	Time
1	Frank Hansen; Svein Thøgersen	Norway	7:03.71
2	Jan Bruyn; Paul Veenemans	Netherlands	7:04.15
3	Jorge Imaz; Ricardo Ibarra	Argentina	7:22.15

==== Repechage 3 ====
Rank	Rower	Country	Time
1	Hans Ruckstuhl; Ueli Isler	Switzerland	7:14.70
2	Albert Heyche; Claude Dehombreux	Belgium	7:17.58
3	Federico Scheffler; Ricardo Scheffler	Mexico	7:40.11
4	Carlos Oliveira; Manuel Barroso	Portugal	7:44.25

==== Repechage 4 ====
Rank	Rower	Country	Time
1	Joachim Böhmer; Uli Schmied	East Germany	7:00.54
2	Roman Kowalewski; Kazimierz Lewandowski	Poland	7:08.27
3	Tsugio Ito; Yoshio Minato	Japan	7:09.73
4	Manfred Krausbar; Sepp Puchinger	Austria	7:16.16

=== Semifinals ===
==== Semifinal A/B ====
First three qualify to the Final A, remainder to Final B.

===== Semifinal 1 =====
Rank	Rower	Country	Time
1	Joachim Böhmer; Uli Schmied	East Germany	7:29.13
2	Tim Crooks; Patrick Delafield	Great Britain	7:31.62
3	Josef Straka, Jr. Vladek Lacina	Czechoslovakia	7:36.83
4	Jan Bruyn; Paul Veenemans	Netherlands	7:40.77
5	Hans Ruckstuhl; Ueli Isler	Switzerland	7:45.42
6	Jochen Meißner; Arthur Heyne	West Germany	7:46.21

===== Semifinal 2 =====
Rank	Rower	Country	Time
1	Niels Henry Secher; Jørgen Engelbrecht	Denmark	7:31.32
2	Aleksandr Timoshinin; Gennadi Korshikov	Soviet Union	7:35.33
3	Frank Hansen; Svein Thøgersen	Norway	7:35.82
4	Jean-Noël Ribot; Roland Thibaut	France	7:47.68
5	Albert Heyche; Claude Dehombreux	Belgium	7:55.00
6	Roman Kowalewski; Kazimierz Lewandowski	Poland	7:59.52

=== Finals ===
==== Final B ====
Rank	Rower	Country	Time
1	Jan Bruyn; Paul Veenemans	Netherlands	7:07.25
2	Hans Ruckstuhl; Ueli Isler	Switzerland	7:08.22
3	Albert Heyche; Claude Dehombreux	Belgium	7:10.03
4	Jochen Meißner; Arthur Heyne	West Germany	7:11.74
5	Jean-Noël Ribot; Roland Thibaut	France	7:14.21
6	Roman Kowalewski; Kazimierz Lewandowski	Poland	7:31.97

==== Final A ====
Rank	Rower	Country	Time
1st place, gold medalist(s)	Aleksandr Timoshinin; Gennadi Korshikov	Soviet Union	7:01.77
2nd place, silver medalist(s)	Frank Hansen; Svein Thøgersen	Norway	7:02.58
3rd place, bronze medalist(s)	Joachim Böhmer; Uli Schmied	East Germany	7:05.55
4	Niels Henry Secher; Jørgen Engelbrecht	Denmark	7:14.19
5	Tim Crooks; Patrick Delafield	Great Britain	7:16.29
6	Josef Straka, Jr. Vladek Lacina	Czechoslovakia	7:17.60
