= Rowing at the 1968 Summer Olympics – Men's single sculls =

Olympic rowing event

Men's single sculls at the Games of the XIX Olympiad
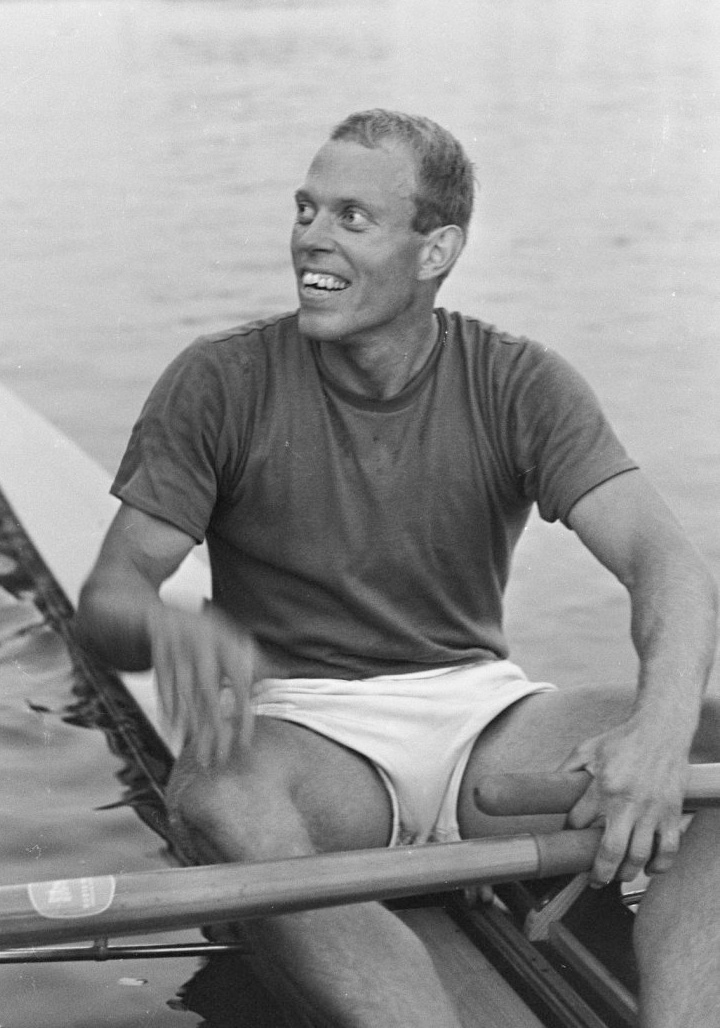
- Gold medalist Jan Wienese (1967)
- Venue: Virgilio Uribe Rowing and Canoeing Course
- Date: 15–19 October 1968
- Competitors: 17 from 17 nations
- Winning time: 7:45.48

Medalists
1st place, gold medalist(s)		Jan Wienese; Netherlands
2nd place, silver medalist(s)		Jochen Meißner; West Germany
3rd place, bronze medalist(s)		Alberto Demiddi; Argentina

The men's single sculls competition at the 1968 Summer Olympics took place at Virgilio Uribe Rowing and Canoeing Course, Mexico. The event was held from 15 to 19 October. There were 17 competitors from 17 nations, with each nation limited to a single boat in the event. The event was won by Jan Wienese of the Netherlands, with Jochen Meißner of West Germany taking silver and Alberto Demiddi of Argentina earning bronze. It was the first medal in men's single sculls for each of the three nations. The Soviet Union's four-Games winning streak in the event ended; three-time champion Vyacheslav Ivanov was left off the team in favor of Viktor Melnikov; Melnikov finished fourth in his semifinal and did not reach the main final.

== Background ==
This was the 15th appearance of the event. Rowing had been on the programme in 1896 but was cancelled due to bad weather. The single sculls has been held every time that rowing has been contested, beginning in 1900.

Three of the 13 single scullers from the 1964 Games returned: two-time silver medalist Achim Hill of the United Team of Germany (now competing for East Germany), fourth-place finisher Alberto Demiddi of Argentina, and twelfth-place finisher Vaclav Kozak of Czechoslovakia. The field was unusually open with many top-flight scullers absent. The Soviet Union sent Viktor Melnikov rather than three-time reigning gold medalist Vyacheslav Ivanov. The United States had John Van Blom rather than reigning World Champion Donald Spero. Great Britain was represented by Kenny Dwan instead of reigning Diamond Challenge Sculls winner Hugh Wardell-Yerburgh. The most accomplished competitors present were Hill and Demiddi (who had also won the Pan American Games). Roger Jackson of Canada and Kozak were Olympic champions, but in other events (1964 coxless pairs for Jackson, 1960 double sculls for Kozak).

Cuba and Romania each made their debut in the event; East and West Germany competed separately for the first time. Great Britain made its 13th appearance, most among nations, after missing only its second edition of the event in 1964.

== Competition format ==
This rowing event was a single scull event, meaning that each boat was propelled by a single rower. The "scull" portion means that the rower used two oars, one on each side of the boat. The course used the 2000 metres distance that became the Olympic standard in 1912.

The tournament, with more rowers than the previous few Games, expanded back to four rounds: three main rounds and a repechage. The competition continued to use the six-boat heat standardised in 1960 as well as the "B" final for ranking 7th through 12th place introduced in 1964.

- Quarterfinals: Three heats of 5 or 6 boats each. The top two boats in each heat (6 total) advanced directly to the semifinals. The remaining boats (11 total) went to the repechage.
- Repechage: Two heats of 5 or 6 boats each (though a nonstarter meant one heat had only 4). The top three boats of each heat (6 total) rejoined the quarterfinal winners in the semifinals. The other boats (5 total, including the nonstarter) were eliminated.
- Semifinals: Two heats of 6 boats each. The top three boats in each heat (6 total) advanced to Final A, the remaining boats (6 total) went to Final B.
- Final: Two finals. Final A consisted of the top 6 boats. Final B was intended to place boats 7 through 12, though only 5 boats started.

== Schedule ==
All times are Central Standard Time (UTC-6)

Date	Time	Round
Sunday, 13 October 1968	10:30	Quarterfinals
Tuesday, 15 October 1968	9:45	Repechage
Thursday, 17 October 1968	11:30	Semifinals
Friday, 18 October 1968	18:10	Final B
Saturday, 19 October 1968	19:08	Final A

== Results ==
=== Quarterfinals ===
The first two rowers in each heat advanced directly to the semifinals. The others competed again in the repechage for the remaining six spots in the semifinals.

==== Quarterfinal 1 ====
Rank	Rower	Nation	Time	Notes
1	Jochen Meißner	West Germany	7:45.80	Q
2	Alberto Demiddi	Argentina	7:49.78	Q
3	Manfred Krausbar	Austria	7:55.70	R
4	Vaclav Kozak	Czechoslovakia	7:59.93	R
5	Zdzislaw Bromek	Poland	8:06.61	R
6	Tsugio Ito	Japan	8:10.00	R

==== Quarterfinal 2 ====
Rank	Rower	Nation	Time	Notes
1	Niels Henry Secher	Denmark	7:51.45	Q
2	Roger Jackson	Canada	7:55.88	Q
3	Viktor Melnikov	Soviet Union	8:03.29	R
4	Eugen Petrache	Romania	8:05.33	R
5	Hans Ruckstuhl	Switzerland	8:08.90	R
6	Heriberto Martínez	Cuba	8:14.20	R

==== Quarterfinal 3 ====
Rank	Rower	Nation	Time	Notes
1	Jan Wienese	Netherlands	7:44.92	Q
2	Achim Hill	East Germany	7:47.23	Q
3	John Van Blom	United States	7:54.79	R
4	Kenny Dwan	Great Britain	8:03.95	R
5	Claude Dehombreux	Belgium	8:19.41	R

=== Repechage ===
The three fastest rowers from each repechage heat advanced to the semifinals.

==== Repechage heat 1 ====
Rank	Rower	Nation	Time	Notes
1	John van Blom	United States	7:43.00	Q
2	Manfred Krausbar	Austria	7:46.65	Q
3	Zdzislaw Bromek	Poland	7:48.68	Q
4	Claude Dehombreux	Belgium	7:54.98	
5	Eugen Petrache	Romania	8:02.94	
6	Heriberto Martinez	Cuba	8:20.92	

==== Repechage heat 2 ====
Rank	Rower	Nation	Time	Notes
1	Kenny Dwan	Great Britain	7:41.98	Q
2	Victor Melnikov	Soviet Union	7:46.86	Q
3	Vaclav Kozak	Czechoslovakia	7:49.93	Q
4	Tsugio Ito	Japan	7:58.08	
—	Hans Ruckstuhl	Switzerland	DNS	

=== Semifinals ===
The first three rowers from each semifinal advanced to Final A, while the rest advanced to Final B.

==== Semifinal 1 ====
Rank	Rower	Nation	Time	Notes
1	Achim Hill	East Germany	7:48.56	QA
2	Jochen Meißner	West Germany	7:51.26	QA
3	Kenny Dwan	Great Britain	7:55.90	QA
4	Vaclav Kozak	Czechoslovakia	8:01.81	QB
5	Niels Henry Secher	Denmark	8:17.64	QB
6	Manfred Krausbar	Austria	8:19.41	QB

==== Semifinal 2 ====
Rank	Rower	Nation	Time	Notes
1	Jan Wienese	Netherlands	7:45.48	QA
2	Alberto Demiddi	Argentina	7:47.98	QA
3	John van Blom	United States	7:49.85	QA
4	Victor Melnikov	Soviet Union	7:50.30	QB
5	Roger Jackson	Canada	8:10.64	QB
6	Zdzislaw Bromek	Poland	8:13.92	QB

=== Finals ===
Final A was for the top six rowers, who still had a chance to get the medals. Final B was used to determine the 7th until 12th place of this rowing event.

==== Final B ====
Rank	Rower	Nation	Time
7	Zdzislaw Bromek	Poland	7:38.88
8	Niels Henry Secher	Denmark	7:43.47
9	Vaclav Kozak	Czechoslovakia	7:45.81
10	Manfred Krausbar	Austria	7:46.19
11	Roger Jackson	Canada	7:48.05
—	Victor Melnikov	Soviet Union	DNS

==== Final A ====
Rank	Rower	Nation	Time
1st place, gold medalist(s)	Jan Wienese	Netherlands	7:45.48
2nd place, silver medalist(s)	Jochen Meißner	West Germany	7:47.98
3rd place, bronze medalist(s)	Alberto Demiddi	Argentina	7:49.85
4	John van Blom	United States	7:50.30
5	Achim Hill	East Germany	8:10.64
6	Kenny Dwan	Great Britain	8:13.92

== Results summary ==
Rank	Rower	Nation	Quarterfinals	Repechage	Semifinals	Finals
1st place, gold medalist(s)	Jan Wienese	Netherlands	7:44.92	Bye	7:45.48	7:45.48; Final A
2nd place, silver medalist(s)	Jochen Meißner	West Germany	7:45.80	Bye	7:51.26	7:47.98; Final A
3rd place, bronze medalist(s)	Alberto Demiddi	Argentina	7:49.78	Bye	7:47.98	7:49.85; Final A
4	John van Blom	United States	7:54.79	7:43.00	7:49.85	7:50.30; Final A
5	Achim Hill	East Germany	7:47.23	Bye	7:48.56	8:10.64; Final A
6	Kenny Dwan	Great Britain	8:03.95	7:41.98	7:55.90	8:13.92; Final A
7	Zdzislaw Bromek	Poland	8:06.61	7:48.68	8:13.92	7:38.88; Final B
8	Niels Henry Secher	Denmark	7:51.45	Bye	8:17.64	7:43.47; Final B
9	Vaclav Kozak	Czechoslovakia	7:59.93	7:49.93	8:01.81	7:45.81; Final B
10	Manfred Krausbar	Austria	7:55.70	7:46.65	8:19.41	7:46.19; Final B
11	Roger Jackson	Canada	7:55.88	Bye	8:10.64	7:48.05; Final B
12	Victor Melnikov	Soviet Union	8:03.29	7:46.86	7:50.30	DNS; Final B
13	Claude Dehombreux	Belgium	8:19.41	7:54.98	Did not advance	
14	Tsugio Ito	Japan	8:10.00	7:58.08	Did not advance	
15	Eugen Petrache	Romania	8:05.33	8:02.94	Did not advance	
16	Heriberto Martinez	Cuba	8:14.20	8:20.92	Did not advance	
17	Hans Ruckstuhl	Switzerland	8:08.90	DNS	Did not advance	

== Sources ==
- The Official Report of the Organising Committee for the Games of the XIX Olympiad Mexico 1968 Volume Three (PDF) (PDF). pp. 544–545.
