= Rowing at the 1976 Summer Olympics – Men's double sculls =

Men's double sculls at the Games of the XXI Olympiad
- Venue: Île Notre-Dame Olympic Basin
- Date: 18–25 July 1976
- Competitors: 26 from 13 nations

Medalists
1st place, gold medalist(s)		Frank Hansen; Alf Hansen	Norway
2nd place, silver medalist(s)		Chris Baillieu; Michael Hart	Great Britain
3rd place, bronze medalist(s)		Jürgen Bertow; Uli Schmied	East Germany

The men's double sculls competition at the 1976 Summer Olympics in Montreal took place from 18 to 25 July at the Olympic Reggatta Course at Île Notre-Dame.

== Results ==
=== Heats ===
Three fastest rowers in each heat advanced to the semi-finals. The remaining rowers must compete in repechage for the remaining spots in semi-finals.

==== Heat 1 ====
Rank	Rower	Country	Time
1	Frank Hansen; Alf Hansen	Norway	6:29.77
2	Yevgeny Barbakov; Gennady Korshikov	Soviet Union	6:38.63
3	Chris Baillieu; Michael Hart	Great Britain	6:40.86
4	Umberto Ragazzi; Silvio Ferrini	Italy	6:47.97
5	Gilberto Gerhardt; Sérgio Sztancsa	Brazil	7:02.18

==== Heat 2 ====
Rank	Rower	Country	Time
1	Jürgen Bertow; Uli Schmied	East Germany	6:39.71
2	Peter Becker; Gerhard Kroschewski	West Germany	6:41.16
3	Jean-Noël Ribot; Jean-Michel Izart	France	6:44.04
4	Bill Belden; Lawrence Klecatsky	United States	6:46.33

==== Heat 3 ====
Rank	Rower	Country	Time
1	Josef Straka; Miroslav Laholík	Czechoslovakia	6:40.55
2	Jean-Henrik Martell; Lennart Bälter	Sweden	6:44.10
3	Zoran Pančić; Darko Majstorović	Yugoslavia	6:49.68
4	Patrick Willems; Didier Vermeersch	Belgium	6:52.09

=== Repechage ===
Top three finishers in heat qualify to the semifinal round.

==== Repechage ====
Rank	Rower	Country	Time
1	Bill Belden; Lawrence Klecatsky	United States	6:34.81
2	Umberto Ragazzi; Silvio Ferrini	Italy	6:38.48
3	Patrick Willems; Didier Vermeersch	Belgium	6:39.48
4	Gilberto Gerhardt; Sérgio Sztancsa	Brazil	6:48.95

=== Semifinals ===
==== Semifinal A/B ====
First three qualify to the Final A, remainder to Final B.

===== Semifinal 1 =====
Rank	Rower	Country	Time
1	Frank Hansen; Alf Hansen	Norway	6:12.48
2	Chris Baillieu; Michael Hart	Great Britain	6:18.38
3	Peter Becker; Gerhard Kroschewski	West Germany	6:21.64
4	Josef Straka; Miroslav Laholík	Czechoslovakia	6:25.02
5	Umberto Ragazzi; Silvio Ferrini	Italy	6:34.34
6	Zoran Pančić; Darko Majstorović	Yugoslavia	6:39.91

===== Semifinal 2 =====
Rank	Rower	Country	Time
1	Jürgen Bertow; Uli Schmied	East Germany	6:24.90
2	Yevgeny Barbakov; Gennady Korshikov	Soviet Union	6:26.87
3	Jean-Noël Ribot; Jean-Michel Izart	France	6:30.83
4	Bill Belden; Lawrence Klecatsky	United States	6:33.88
5	Jean-Henrik Martell; Lennart Bälter	Sweden	6:35.51
6	Patrick Willems; Didier Vermeersch	Belgium	6:42.32

=== Finals ===
==== Final B ====
Rank	Rower	Country	Time
1	Umberto Ragazzi; Silvio Ferrini	Italy	7:15.21
2	Bill Belden; Lawrence Klecatsky	United States	7:16.59
3	Zoran Pančić; Darko Majstorović	Yugoslavia	7:21.69
4	Josef Straka; Miroslav Laholík	Czechoslovakia	7:23.49
5	Jean-Henrik Martell; Lennart Bälter	Sweden	7:25.57
6	Patrick Willems; Didier Vermeersch	Belgium	7:25.82

==== Final A ====
Rank	Rower	Country	Time
1st place, gold medalist(s)	Frank Hansen; Alf Hansen	Norway	7:13.20
2nd place, silver medalist(s)	Chris Baillieu; Michael Hart	Great Britain	7:15.26
3rd place, bronze medalist(s)	Jürgen Bertow; Uli Schmied	East Germany	7:17.45
4	Yevgeny Barbakov; Gennady Korshikov	Soviet Union	7:18.87
5	Peter Becker; Gerhard Kroschewski	West Germany	7:22.15
6	Jean-Noël Ribot; Jean-Michel Izart	France	7:50.18
