= Josef Straka =

Josef Straka or Joseph Straka may refer to

- Josef Straka (rower, born 1904), Sr. (1904–1976), Olympic rower from Czechoslovakia
- Josef Straka (rower, born 1948), Jr. (born 1948), Olympic rower from Czechoslovakia
- Josef Straka (ice hockey) (born 1978), Czech ice hockey player
- Sepp Straka (Josef Straka, born 1993), Olympic golfer from Austria
