= Petrache =

Petrache is a Romanian surname and masculine given name. Notable people with the name include:

== Surname ==
- Alin Petrache (born 1976), Romanian rugby union administrator and former player
- Eugen Petrache (born 1945), Romanian rower
- Iulian Petrache (born 1991), Romanian footballer

== Given name ==
- Petrache Lupu (1907–1994), Romanian shepherd
- Petrache Poenaru (1799–1875), Romanian inventor

== See also ==
- Petrachi
