= Peter Becker (rower) =

German rower (born 1956)

Personal information
- Born: 16 July 1956 (age 70) Geisenheim

Sport
- Sport: Rowing

Peter Becker (born 16 July 1956 in Geisenheim) is a West German rower who competed at the 1976 Summer Olympics in double sculls. Together with Gerhard Kroschewski, he came fifth.
