= Vladek Lacina =

Czech rower (1949–2026)

Medal record

Men's rowing

Representing Czechoslovakia

Olympic Games
Bronze medal – third place	1976 Montreal	Quadruple sculls

Friendship Games
Bronze medal – third place	1984 Moscow	Single sculls

Lacina, bronze medalist in quadruple scull, 1976 Summer Olympics

Vladek Lacina (25 June 1949 – August 2026) was a Czech rower who competed for Czechoslovakia in the 1972 Summer Olympics, in the 1976 Summer Olympics, and in the 1980 Summer Olympics.

== Biography ==
Lacina was born in Prague on 25 June 1949. His mother was a Ravensbrück concentration camp survivor and his father a political prisoner. They were forced to work at the Jáchymov uranium mines for ten years. He opined that from his rowing success he had collected what the Communist regime owed him.

In 1972 he and his partner Josef Straka finished sixth in the double sculls event.

Four years later he won the bronze medal with the Czechoslovak boat in the quadruple sculls competition.

At the 1980 Games he finished fourth in the single sculls contest.

Lacina's death was announced on 18 August 2026. He was 77.

== Sources ==
- Evans, Hilary; Gjerde, Arild; Heijmans, Jeroen; Mallon, Bill; et al. "Vladek Lacina". Olympics at Sports-Reference.com. Sports Reference LLC. Archived from the original on 18 April 2020.
