= Carlos Oliveira =

Carlos Oliveira or Carlos de Oliveira may refer to:

- Carlos Oliveira (rower) (1943–2023), Portuguese Olympic rower
- Carlos Oliveira (footballer), Cuban footballer
- Carlos Oliveira (Resident Evil), a fictional character in the Resident Evil franchise
- Carlos Alberto Caó de Oliveira (1941–2018), Brazilian activist, lawyer, and politician
- Carlos Alberto de Oliveira Júnior (born 1978), Brazilian footballer
- Capone (footballer) (Carlos Alberto de Oliveira, born 1972), Brazilian footballer
- Carlos de Oliveira (1921–1981), Portuguese poet and novelist
- Carlos De Oliveira, an aide to Donald Trump notable as a co-defendant of Trump in federal prosecution in Florida
- Carlitos Oliveira (born 1993), Portuguese footballer
