= Manuel Barroso =

Manuel Barroso may refer to:

- Manuel Barroso (pentathlete)
- Manuel Barroso (rower)
- José Manuel Barroso, Portuguese politician and law professor
