= Joachim Böhmer =

East German rower

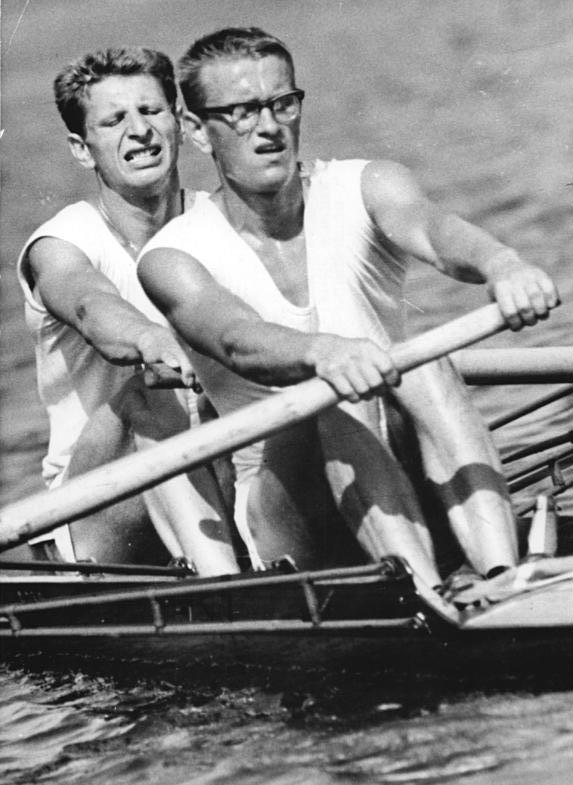
- Böhmer (right) in 1962

Personal information
- Born: 1 October 1940 Berlin, Germany
- Died: 28 December 1999 (aged 59) Berlin, Germany
- Height: 1.82 m (6 ft 0 in)
- Weight: 82 kg (181 lb)
- Spouse: Irmgard Brendenal-Böhmer

Sport
- Sport: Rowing
- Club: SC Dynamo Berlin
Medal record
Men's rowing
Representing East Germany
Olympic Games
Bronze medal – third place	1972 Munich	Double sculls
World Rowing Championships
Silver medal – second place	1970 St. Catharines	Double sculls
Bronze medal – third place	1966 Bled	Eight
European Rowing Championships
Gold medal – first place	1971 Copenhagen	Double sculls
Silver medal – second place	1969 Klagenfurt	Single sculls

Hans-Joachim Böhmer (1 October 1940 – 28 December 1999) was an East German rower who won a bronze medal in the double sculls at the 1972 Summer Olympics, together with Uli Schmied.

== Biography ==
Before his appearance at the Olympic Games, Böhmer (with Schmied) won a European title in 1971 and a silver medal at the 1970 World Rowing Championships. In other rowing events Böhmer won a bronze medal in the eights at the 1966 World Rowing Championships.

In 1969, Böhmer won the Diamond Challenge Sculls (the premier singles sculls event) at the Henley Royal Regatta, rowing for SC Dynamo Berlin.

On retiring from sport Böhmer studied political science, and became a criminologist for the police in the Köpenick district of former East Berlin. His wife Irmgard Brendenal-Böhmer was also European champion in rowing.
