= Ribot (surname) =

Ribot (and its variant La Ribot) is a surname. Notable people with the surname include:

- Alexandre Ribot (1842–1923), four times Prime Minister of France
- Eulàlia Ferrer Ribot (1776–1850), Spanish printer
- Gemma Arró Ribot (born 1980), Catalan ski mountaineer
- Jean-Noël Ribot (born 1949), French rower
- John Ribot, Australian sports administrator and former rugby league international
- José María Vallés y Ribot (1849–1911), Catalan Spanish politician
- Marc Ribot (born 1954), American guitarist and composer
- María La Ribot (born 1962), Spanish dancer and choreographer
- Théodule Ribot (1823–1891), French realist painter
- Théodule-Armand Ribot (1839–1916), French psychologist
- Verónica Ribot (born 1962), Argentine diver

== See also ==
- Ribot, disambiguation page
