= Marion Rohs =

Sport
- Sport: Rowing
- Club: SC Berlin-Grünau
Medal record
Women's rowing
Representing East Germany
World Rowing Championships
Gold medal – first place	1977 Amsterdam	Coxed four

Marion Rohs is a rower who competed for East Germany in the 1970s.

At the 1976 East German national championships, Rohs teamed up with Vanadies Lippold and they came second in the coxless pair; it was, however, the year that women's rowing was introduced at the Olympic Games and the Olympic team members did not participate at the national championships. At the 1977 East German national championships, Rohs won the coxed four title alongside Bärbel Bendiks, Katja Rothe, Ilona Richter, and coxswain Marina Wilke. That team went to the 1977 World Rowing Championships on the Bosbaan rowing lake in the Netherlands where they became world champions. In February 1978, she was given two sports awards: Master of Sport and Honored Master of Sports. Rohs travelled as a reserve to the 1978 World Rowing Championships in New Zealand but did not compete.
