= Irmgard Brendenal-Böhmer =

East German rower

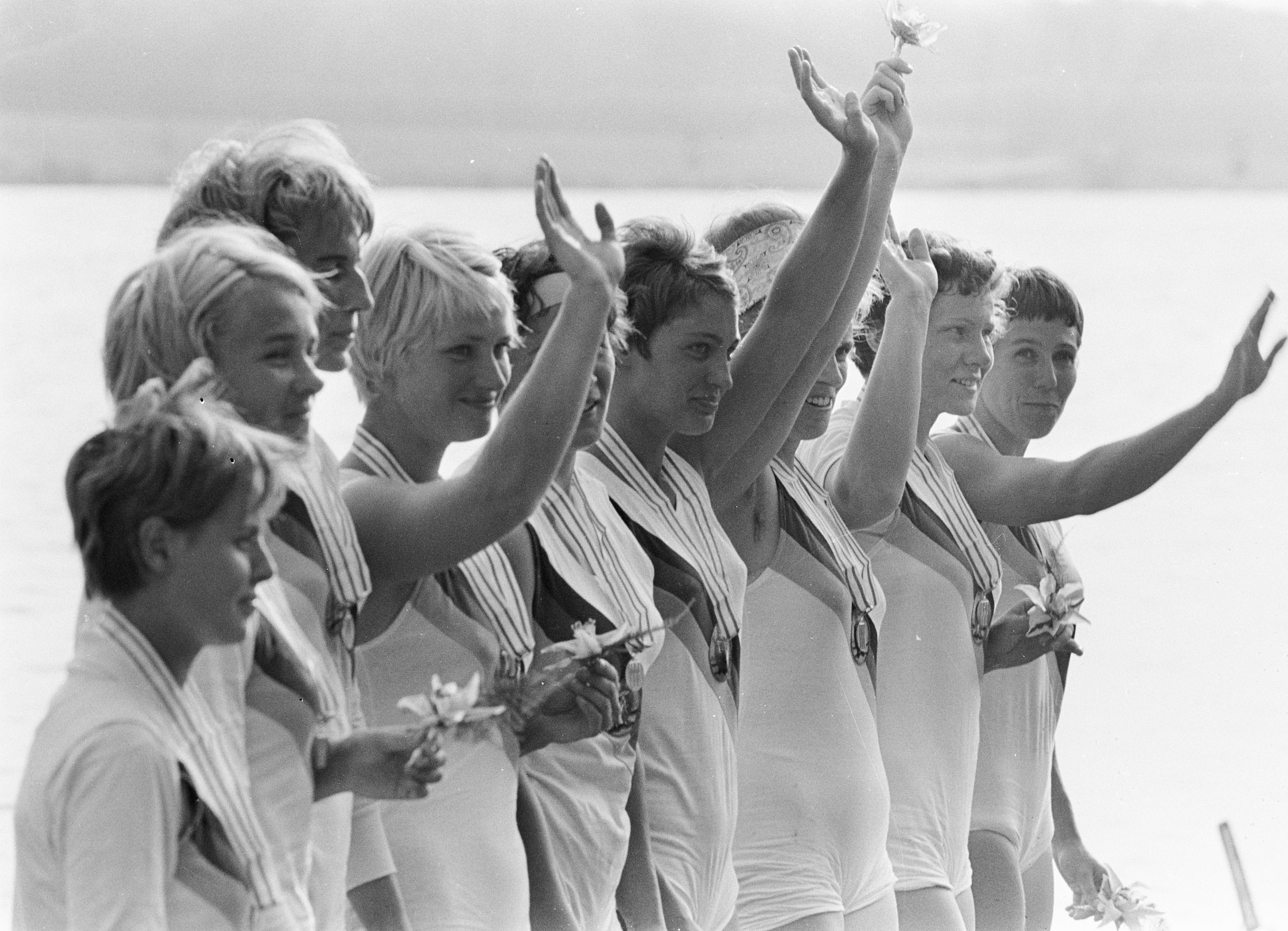
- Brendenal (middle) at the 1966 European Championships

Personal information
- Spouse: Joachim Böhmer

Sport
- Sport: Rowing
- Club: SC DHfK Leipzig
Medal record
Representing East Germany
European Rowing Championships
| Gold medal – first place | 1964 Amsterdam | Eight |
| Gold medal – first place | 1966 Amsterdam | Eight |

Irmgard Brendenal-Böhmer (née Brendenal) is a retired East German rower who won two European titles in the eights event in 1964 and 1966. Her husband Joachim Böhmer was also a competitive rower.
