= Jean-Michel Izart =

French rower

Personal information
- Nationality: French
- Born: 26 July 1954 (age 70)

Sport
- Sport: Rowing

Jean-Michel Izart (born 26 July 1954) is a French rower. He competed in the men's double sculls event at the 1976 Summer Olympics.
