= Silvio Ferrini =

Italian rower

Personal information
- Nationality: Italian
- Born: 28 August 1949 (age 75)

Sport
- Sport: Rowing

Silvio Ferrini (born 28 August 1949) is an Italian rower. He competed in the men's double sculls event at the 1976 Summer Olympics.
