= Peter Barr (rower) =

Canadian rower

Personal information
- Born: 7 October 1950 (age 74); Kingston, Ontario, Canada

Sport
- Sport: Rowing

Peter Barr (born 7 October 1950) is a Canadian rower. He competed in the men's double sculls event at the 1972 Summer Olympics.
