= Jean-Henrik Martell =

Swedish rower

Personal information
- Nationality: Swedish
- Born: 4 April 1949 (age 75); Budapest, Hungary

Sport
- Sport: Rowing

Jean-Henrik Martell (born 4 April 1949) is a Swedish rower. He competed in the men's double sculls event at the 1976 Summer Olympics.
