= John McNiven (rower) =

Canadian rower

Personal information
- Nationality: Canadian
- Born: 25 September 1945 (age 79); Alexandria, Scotland

Sport
- Sport: Rowing

John McNiven (born 25 September 1945) is a Canadian rower. He competed in the men's double sculls event at the 1972 Summer Olympics.
