= Gilberto Gerhardt =

Brazilian rower

Personal information
- Nationality: Brazilian
- Born: 5 June 1949 (age 76)

Sport
- Sport: Rowing

Gilberto Gerhardt (born 5 June 1949) is a Brazilian rower. He competed in the men's double sculls event at the 1976 Summer Olympics.
