= Patrick Willems =

Belgian rower

Personal information
- Nationality: Belgian
- Born: 10 November 1945 (age 80)

Sport
- Sport: Rowing

Patrick Willems (born 10 November 1945) is a Belgian rower. He competed in the men's double sculls event at the 1976 Summer Olympics.
