= Sepp Puchinger =

Austrian rower

Personal information
- Nationality: Austrian
- Born: 22 December 1948; Krems an der Donau, Austria
- Died: 7 March 1984 (aged 35); Krems an der Donau, Austria

Sport
- Sport: Rowing

Sepp Puchinger (22 December 1948 – 7 March 1984) was an Austrian rower. He competed in the men's double sculls event at the 1972 Summer Olympics.
