= Svein Thøgersen =

Norwegian rower (born 1946)

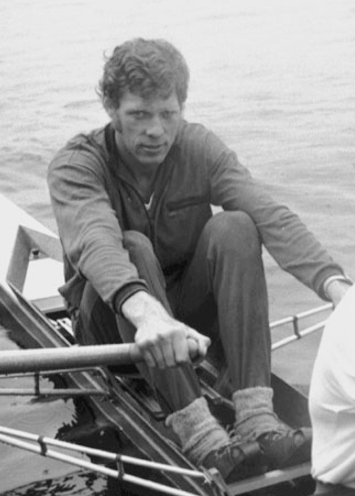
- Thøgersen in 1971

Personal information
- Born: 23 June 1946 (age 80) Sarpsborg, Norway
- Height: 195 cm (6 ft 5 in)
- Weight: 90 kg (198 lb)

Sport
- Sport: Rowing
- Club: Ormsund Roklub, Oslo
Medal record
Representing Norway
Olympic Games
Silver medal – second place	1972 Munich	Double sculls
European championships
Silver medal – second place	1971 Copenhagen	Double sculls

Svein Thorleif Thøgersen (born 23 June 1946) is a retired Norwegian rower. Competing in double sculls with Frank Hansen he won silver medals at the 1971 European Championships and 1972 Munich Olympics.
