= Yoshio Minato =

Japanese rower (born 1949)

Personal information
- Nationality: Japanese
- Born: 26 January 1949 (age 76)

Sport
- Sport: Rowing

Yoshio Minato (湊 義雄, Minato Yoshio, born 26 January 1949) is a Japanese rower. He competed in the men's double sculls event at the 1972 Summer Olympics.
