= Frank Hansen (rower) =

Norwegian rower (born 1945)

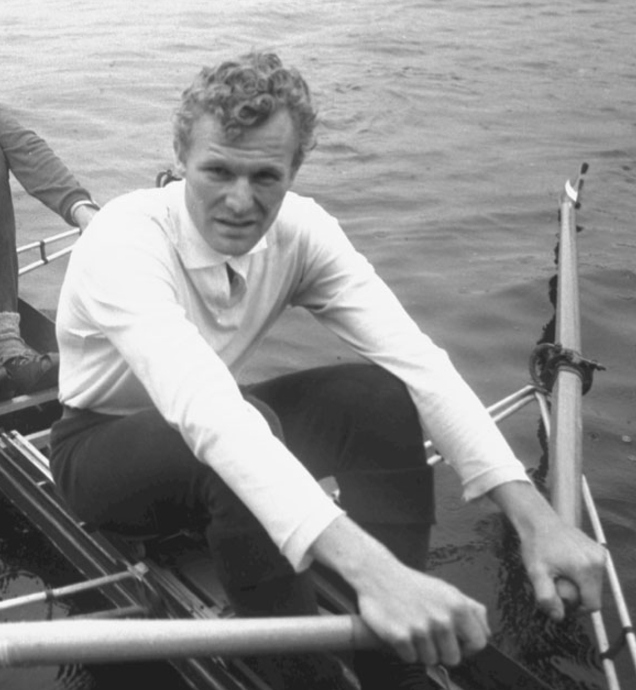
- Hansen in 1971

Personal information
- Born: 4 August 1945 (age 80) Oslo, Norway
- Height: 1.93 m (6 ft 4 in)
- Weight: 92 kg (203 lb)
- Relatives: Alf Hansen (brother)

Sport
- Sport: Rowing
- Club: Ormsund Roklub, Oslo
Medal record
Representing Norway
Olympic Games
Gold medal – first place	1976 Montreal	Double sculls
Silver medal – second place	1972 Munich	Double sculls
World Rowing Championships
Gold medal – first place	1975 Nottingham	Double sculls
Gold medal – first place	1978 Hamilton	Double sculls
Gold medal – first place	1979 Bled	Double sculls
Silver medal – second place	1974 Lucerne	Double sculls
European Rowing Championships
Silver medal – second place	1971 Copenhagen	Double sculls

Frank Hansen (born 4 August 1945) is a retired rower from Norway who specialized in the double sculls. In this event, he won silver medals at the 1972 Summer Olympics and 1972 European Championships, together with Svein Thøgersen.

Since 1974, Hansen rowed with his younger brother Alf. They won a silver medal at the 1974 World Championships, followed by gold medals at the 1975, 1978 and 1979 World Championships and at the 1976 Summer Olympics.
