= Kazimierz Lewandowski =

Polish rower (1951–2021)

Personal information
- Nationality: Polish
- Born: 28 March 1951; Gdańsk, Poland
- Died: 27 December 2021 (aged 70)

Sport
- Sport: Rowing

Kazimierz Lewandowski (28 March 1951 – 27 December 2021) was a Polish rower. He competed in the men's double sculls event at the 1972 Summer Olympics.

He died on 27 December 2021, at the age of 70.
