= Jochen Meißner =

West German rower (born 1943)

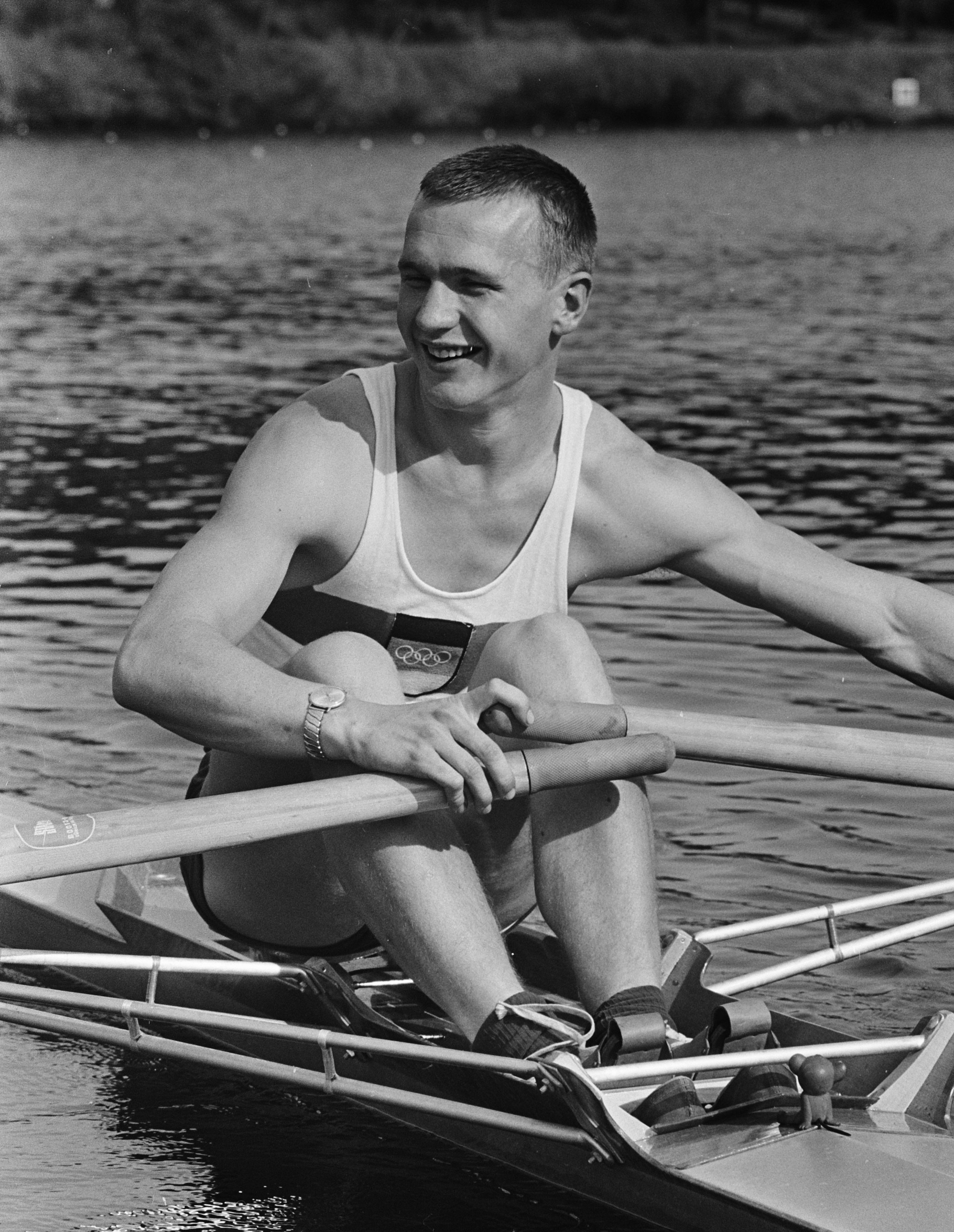
- Meißner in 1965

Personal information
- Born: 8 May 1943 (age 83) Stuttgart, Germany
- Height: 1.79 m (5 ft 10 in)
- Weight: 79 kg (174 lb)

Sport
- Sport: Rowing
- Club: MRV Amicitia, Mannheim
Medal record
Representing West Germany
Olympic Games
Silver medal – second place	1968 Mexico City	Single sculls
World Rowing Championships
Bronze medal – third place	1966 Bled	Single sculls
European Rowing Championships
Gold medal – first place	1965 Duisburg	Single sculls
Bronze medal – third place	1969 Klagenfurt	Single sculls

Jochen Meißner (born 8 May 1943) was a leading single scull rower of West Germany between 1965 and 1972, who competed in the Olympic Games.

== Biography ==
In the singled sculls event, he won national titles in 1965–1968 and a European title in 1965; a silver medal at the 1968 Summer Olympics, as well as bronze medals at the world (1966) and European (1969) championships. At the 1967 European Rowing Championships in Vichy, he came fourth in the single sculls. He also competed in the double sculls at the 1972 Summer Olympics, together with Arthur Heyne, and finished in tenth place.

In 1970, Meißner won the Diamond Challenge Sculls (the premier singles sculls event) at the Henley Royal Regatta, rowing for Mannheimer RV Amicitia.
