= Umberto Ragazzi =

Italian rower

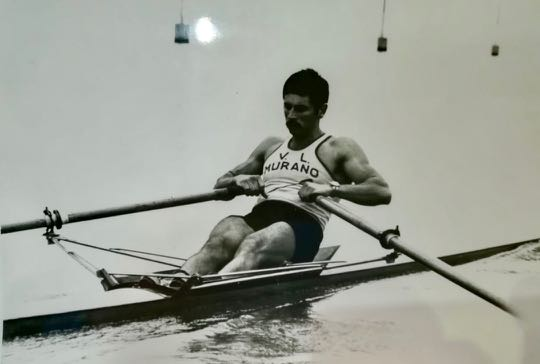
- Umberto Ragazzi

Personal information
- Nationality: Italian
- Born: 27 July 1953 (age 71); Murano, Italy

Sport
- Sport: Rowing

Umberto Ragazzi (born 27 July 1953) is an Italian rower. He competed in the men's double sculls event at the 1976 Summer Olympics.

He also placed fourth in the men's single sculls event at the 1975 World rowing championships in Nottingham.
