= Darko Majstorović =

Yugoslav rower (born 1946)

Personal information
- Nationality: Yugoslav
- Born: 15 February 1946 (age 79)

Sport
- Sport: Rowing

Darko Majstorović (born 15 February 1946) is a Yugoslav rower. He competed in the men's double sculls event at the 1976 Summer Olympics.
