= Jorge Imaz =

Argentine rower

Personal information
- Nationality: Argentine
- Born: 25 November 1950 (age 74)

Sport
- Sport: Rowing

Jorge Imaz (born 25 November 1950) is an Argentine rower. He competed in the men's double sculls event at the 1972 Summer Olympics.

The Jáuregui locality of Buenos Aires named one of its schools after Imaz in 2019, who was a local of the area.
