= Paul Veenemans =

Dutch rower

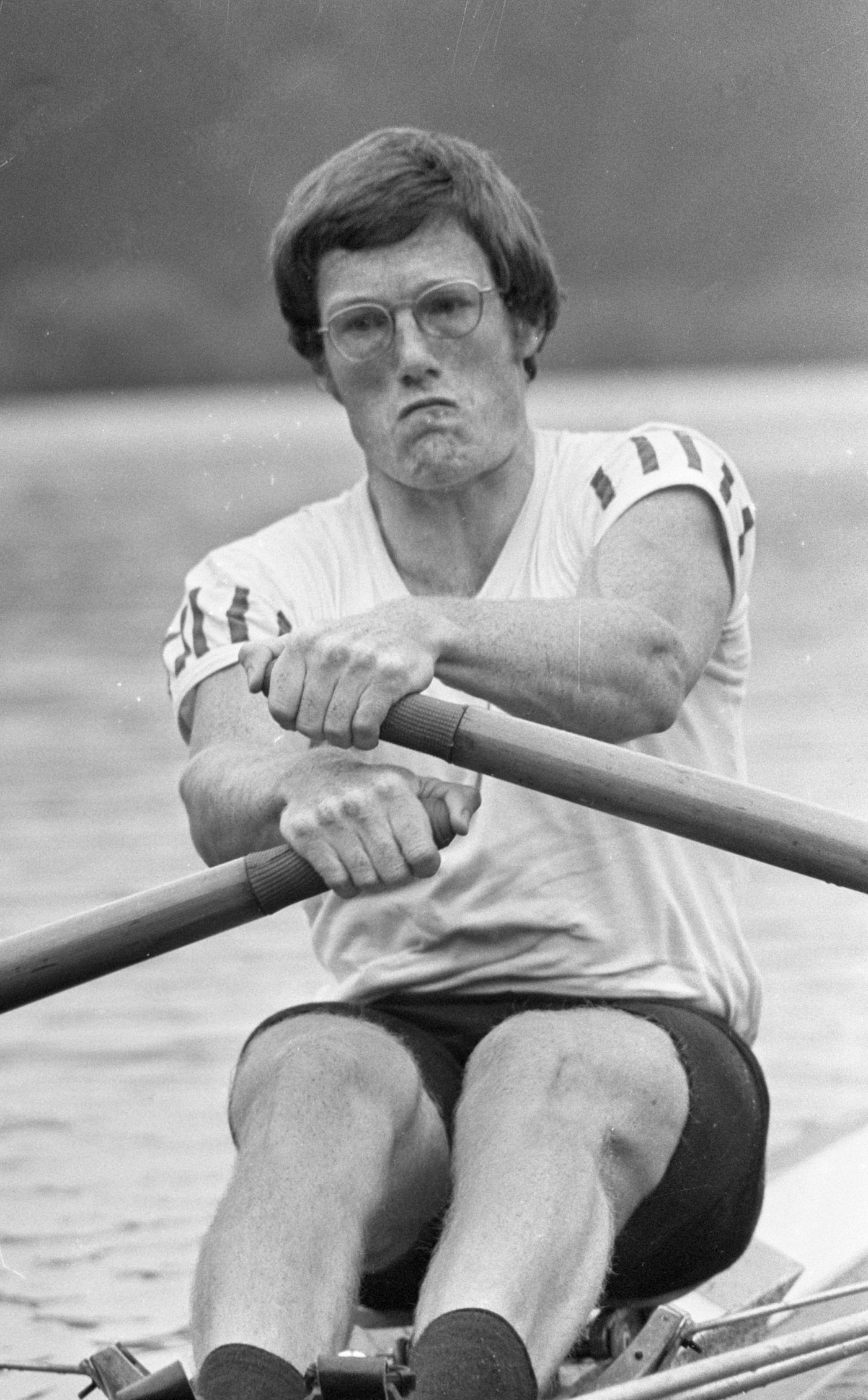
- Paul Veenemans in 1972

Personal information
- Born: 21 January 1947 Amsterdam, the Netherlands
- Died: 6 February 1973 (aged 26) Amsterdam, the Netherlands
- Height: 1.86 m (6 ft 1 in)
- Weight: 81 kg (179 lb)

Sport
- Sport: Rowing
- Club: Nereus, Amsterdam

Paul Jan Veenemans (21 January 1947 – 6 February 1973) was a Dutch rower. He competed at the 1972 Summer Olympics in the doubled sculls, together with Jan Bruyn, and finished in seventh place. His elder brother Ernst was also an Olympic rower.

Veenemans died in a car accident in 1973, aged 26. Since 1975, an annual rowing competition is carried out in his honor.
