= Lawrence Klecatsky =

American rower (1941–2018)

Personal information
- Full name: Lawrence Joseph Klecatsky
- Born: August 11, 1941 South St. Paul, Minnesota, U.S.
- Died: December 13, 2018 (aged 77) Sarasota, Florida, U.S.

Sport
- Sport: Rowing

Lawrence Joseph Klecatsky (August 11, 1941 – December 13, 2018) was an American rower. He competed in the men's double sculls event at the 1976 Summer Olympics.
