= Ribot =

Ribot may refer to:

== People ==
- Ribot (surname), list of people with the surname

== Other uses ==
- Ribot (horse) (1952-1972), racehorse in Europe in the 1950s
- Ribot's law, law in retrograde amnesia
- Cal Ribot, house located in Andorra
- Lait Ribot, fermented milk drink, similar to buttermilk, from Brittany, France
- Lycée Alexandre Ribot, school in France
