= Bill Belden =

American rower (1949–2025)

Personal information
- Full name: William Thomas Belden Jr.
- Born: January 5, 1949 Washington, D.C., U.S.
- Died: January 18, 2025 (aged 76)

Sport
- Sport: Rowing
Medal record
Men's rowing
Representing the United States
World Championships
| Gold medal – first place | 1974 Lucerne | LM1x |
| Gold medal – first place | 1979 Bled | LM1x |

William Thomas Belden (January 5, 1949 – January 18, 2025) was an American rower. Bill Belden rowed at La Salle University. He competed in the men's double sculls event at the 1976 Summer Olympics. Belden died on January 18, 2025, at the age of 76.
