= Ueli Isler =

Swiss rower

Personal information
- Nationality: Swiss
- Born: 27 April 1946 (age 78)

Sport
- Sport: Rowing

Ueli Isler (born 27 April 1946) is a Swiss rower. He competed in the men's double sculls event at the 1972 Summer Olympics.
