= Jan Wienese =

Dutch rower (born 1942)

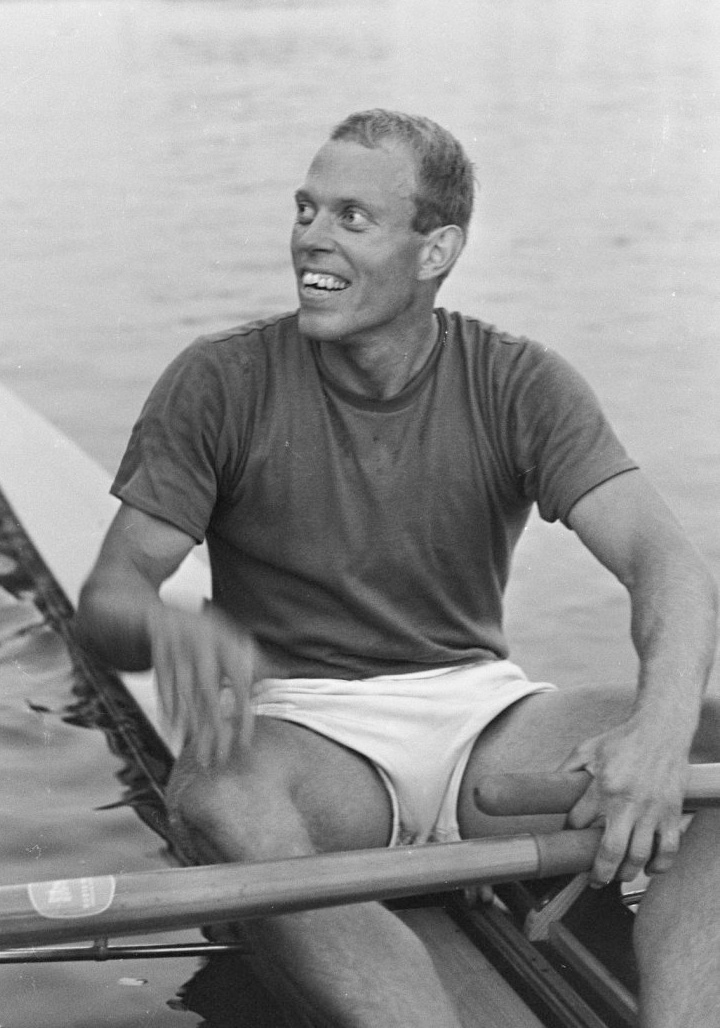
- Wienese in 1967

Personal information
- Full name: Henri Jan Wienese
- Born: 4 June 1942 (age 84) Amsterdam, Netherlands
- Height: 1.78 m (5 ft 10 in)
- Weight: 81 kg (179 lb)

Sport
- Sport: Rowing
- Club: De Amstel, Amsterdam
Medal record
Representing the Netherlands
Men's rowing
Olympic Games
Gold medal – first place	1968 Mexico City	Single sculls
World Rowing Championships
Silver medal – second place	1966 Bled	Single sculls
European Rowing Championships
Bronze medal – third place	1965 Duisburg	Single sculls
Bronze medal – third place	1967 Vichy	Single sculls

Henri Jan Wienese (born 4 June 1942) is a former Dutch competition rower. He won the gold medal in single sculls at the 1968 Summer Olympics in Mexico City, the first gold medal ever for the Netherlands in this event. He also won two European bronze medals in single sculls in 1965 and 1967, as well as a silver at the 1966 World Rowing Championships.

Jan Wienese has one son, Michiel Wienese, who is a two fold World Champion Masters in speedskating (M40 and M45)WWMG2024 Introduction Michiel Wienese Through his sister Jetty Baars-Wienese, a former Dutch tennis champion, Wienese is the great-uncle of French former basketball player, Tony Parker.
