= Albert Heyche =

Belgian rower

Personal information
- Nationality: Belgian
- Born: 29 June 1949 (age 75)

Sport
- Sport: Rowing

Albert Heyche (born 29 June 1949) is a Belgian rower. He competed in the men's double sculls event at the 1972 Summer Olympics.
