= Viktor Melnikov =

Personal information
- Born: 10 July 1944 (age 80); Moscow, Russian SFSR, Soviet Union
- Height: 193 cm (6 ft 4 in)
- Weight: 85 kg (187 lb)

Sport
- Sport: Rowing

Viktor Nikolayevich Melnikov (Russian name: Виктор Николаевич Мельников; born 10 July 1944) is a Soviet rower from Russia. He competed at the 1968 Summer Olympics in Mexico City in the men's single sculls event where he qualified for the small final but did not start.
