= Roman Kowalewski =

Polish rower (1949–2024)

Personal information
- Born: 18 February 1949; Szczecin, Poland
- Died: 22 October 2024 (aged 75); Peru
- Height: 183 cm (6 ft 0 in)
- Weight: 81 kg (179 lb)

Sport
- Sport: Rowing
- Club: AZS Szczecin

Roman Kowalewski (18 February 1949 – 22 October 2024) was a Polish rower. He competed in the men's double sculls event at the 1972 Summer Olympics. Kowalewski died in Peru on 22 October 2024, at the age of 75.
