= Petrachi =

Petrachi is an Italian surname. Notable people with the surname include:

- Bruno Petrachi (born 1997), Italian footballer
- Davide Petrachi (born 1986), Italian footballer
- Gianluca Petrachi (born 1969), Italian footballer

== See also ==
- Petrache
