= Miroslav Laholík =

Czech rower

Personal information
- Nationality: Czech
- Born: 28 August 1952 (age 72); Litoměřice, Czechoslovakia

Sport
- Sport: Rowing

Miroslav Laholík (born 28 August 1952) is a Czech former rower. He competed in the men's double sculls event at the 1976 Summer Olympics.
