= Didier Vermeersch =

Belgian rower

Personal information
- Nationality: Belgian
- Born: 6 January 1953 (age 72)
- Died: 11 february 2022

Sport
- Sport: Rowing

Didier Vermeersch (born 6 January 1953) is a Belgian rower. He competed in the men's double sculls event at the 1976 Summer Olympics.
