= Katja Rothe =

Sport
- Sport: Rowing
- Club: SC Berlin-Grünau
Medal record
Women's rowing
Representing East Germany
World Rowing Championships
Gold medal – first place	1977 Amsterdam	Coxed four

Katja Rothe is a rower who competed for East Germany in the 1970s.

Rothe is first mentioned in the media when she took out the coxed four title in the junior class at the 1969 East German national championships. Of the 93 races that day, theirs was the closest that any of the five leading boats could have won. Monika Kurtz was the cox of their team; she would become the 1973 European Champion with the coxed quad scull.

At the 1974 East German national championships, Rothe came third with the women's eight. The following year, she came second with the women's eight at the national championships. At the 1976 East German national championships, Rothe was part of the coxed four that won the title and she came second with the eight. It was, however, the year that women's rowing was introduced at the Olympic Games and the Olympic team members did not participate at the national championships. At the 1977 East German national championships, Rothe won the coxed four title alongside Bärbel Bendiks, Marion Rohs, Ilona Richter, and coxswain Marina Wilke. That team went to the 1977 World Rowing Championships on the Bosbaan rowing lake in the Netherlands where they became world champions. In February 1978, she was given two sports awards: Master of Sport and Honored Master of Sports.

At the 1978 East German national championships, Rothe came third with the coxed four and took out the national title with the women's eight.
