= Heriberto Martínez =

Cuban rower (born 1944)

Personal information
- Nationality: Cuban
- Born: 16 June 1944 (age 81)

Sport
- Sport: Rowing

Heriberto Martínez (born 16 June 1944) is a Cuban rower. He competed in the men's single sculls event at the 1968 Summer Olympics.
