= Bärbel Bendiks =

German rower

Personal information
- Spouse: Uli Schmied

Sport
- Sport: Rowing
- Club: SC Berlin-Grünau
Medal record
Women's rowing
Representing East Germany
World Rowing Championships
Gold medal – first place	1977 Amsterdam	Coxed four

Bärbel Bendiks is a rower who competed for East Germany in the 1970s and early 1980s.

Bendiks rowed for SC Berlin-Grünau. At the 1976 East German national championships, Bendiks rowed with the coxed pair and the women's eight; she came first and second, respectively. However, that year women's rowing was introduced at the Olympic Games and the Olympic team members did not participate at the national championships. At the 1977 East German national championships, Bendiks won the coxed four title alongside Marion Rohs, Katja Rothe, Ilona Richter, and coxswain Marina Wilke. That team went to the 1977 World Rowing Championships on the Bosbaan rowing lake in the Netherlands where they became world champions. In February 1978, she was given two sports awards: Master of Sport and Honoured Master of Sports.

At the 1978 East German national championships, Bendiks came third with the coxed four and took out the national title with the women's eight. She went to the 1978 World Rowing Championships on Lake Karapiro in New Zealand as a reserve but did not compete. It was at those championships that she got closer to one of the male rowers whom she later married; Uli Schmied was also present as a reserve.

At the 1980 East German national championships, Bendiks came third with the women's eight; again, the Olympic team members were absent from that competition. At the 1981 East German national championships, Bendiks came third with the coxed four and took out the title with the women's eight. She went to the 1981 World Rowing Championships that were held near Munich in Germany where the women's eight came fifth.
