= Sérgio Sztancsa =

Brazilian rower

Personal information
- Nationality: Brazilian
- Born: 27 May 1954 (age 70)

Sport
- Sport: Rowing

Sérgio Sztancsa (born 27 May 1954) is a Brazilian rower. He competed in the men's double sculls event at the 1976 Summer Olympics.
