= Jürgen Bertow =

East German rower

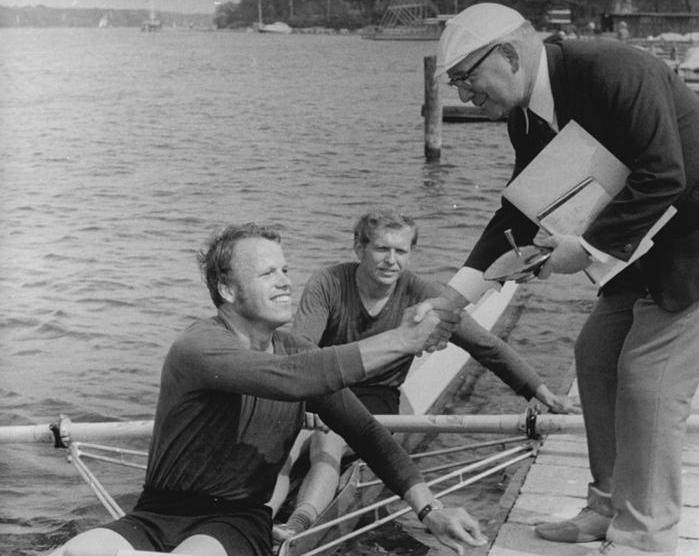
- Bertow (center) in 1976

Personal information
- Born: 21 April 1950 (age 76) Berlin, Germany
- Height: 1.84 m (6 ft 0 in)
- Weight: 79 kg (174 lb)

Sport
- Sport: Rowing
- Club: SC Dynamo Berlin
Medal record
Men's rowing
Representing East Germany
Olympic Games
Bronze medal – third place	1976 Montreal	Double sculls
World Rowing Championships
Gold medal – first place	1974 Lucerne	Quadruple sculls
Silver medal – second place	1975 Nottingham	Double sculls

Jürgen Bertow (born 21 April 1950) is a retired German rower. He won a bronze medal at the 1976 Summer Olympics and a silver at the 1975 World Championships in the double sculls, as well as a world title in the quad sculls in 1974. For these achievements he received the Patriotic Order of Merit in 1974 and 1976.
