= Gerhard Kroschewski =

German rower

Personal information
- Nationality: German
- Born: 16 February 1956 (age 69); Kassel, Germany

Sport
- Sport: Rowing

Gerhard Kroschewski (born 16 February 1956) is a German rower. He competed in the men's double sculls event at the 1976 Summer Olympics.
