= Eugen Petrache =

Romanian rower

Personal information
- Nationality: Romanian
- Born: 13 July 1945 (age 79); Bucharest, Romania

Sport
- Sport: Rowing

Eugen Petrache (born 13 July 1945) is a Romanian rower. He competed in the men's single sculls event at the 1968 Summer Olympics.
