= Manuel Barroso (rower) =

Portuguese rower (born 1931)

Personal information
- Full name: Manuel da Silva Barroso
- Nationality: Portuguese
- Born: 14 August 1931 (age 95)

Sport
- Sport: Rowing

Manuel Barroso (born 14 August 1931) is a Portuguese rower. He competed in the men's double sculls event at the 1972 Summer Olympics.
