= Gennadiy Korshikov =

Russian rower (born 1949)

Gennadi Korshikov
Personal information
- Born: 19 February 1949 (age 77) Leningrad, Russian SFSR, Soviet Union

Sport
- Sport: Rowing
Medal record
Men's rowing
Representing the Soviet Union
Olympic Games
Gold medal – first place	1972 Munich	Double sculls
World Rowing Championships
Silver medal – second place	1974 Lucerne	Quadruple sculls
Bronze medal – third place	1977 Amsterdam	Double sculls
European Rowing Championships
Bronze medal – third place	1971 Copenhagen	Double sculls
Silver medal – second place	1973 Moscow	Double sculls

Gennadi Egorovich Korshikov (Russian: Геннадий Егорович Коршиков; born 19 February 1949) is a Russian rower who competed for the Soviet Union in the 1972 Summer Olympics and in the 1976 Summer Olympics.

He was born in Leningrad.

In 1972 he and his partner Aleksandr Timoshinin won the gold medal in the double sculls event.

Four years later he and his partner Evgeni Barbakov finished fourth in the 1976 double sculls competition.
