= Carlos Oliveira (rower) =

Portuguese rower (1943–2023)

Personal information
- Nationality: Portuguese
- Born: 12 September 1943; Barreiro, Portugal
- Died: 3 October 2023 (aged 80)

Sport
- Sport: Rowing

Carlos Oliveira (12 September 1943 – 3 October 2023) was a Portuguese rower. He competed in the men's double sculls event at the 1972 Summer Olympics. Oliveira died on 3 October 2023, at the age of 80.
