= Jan Bruyn =

Dutch rower

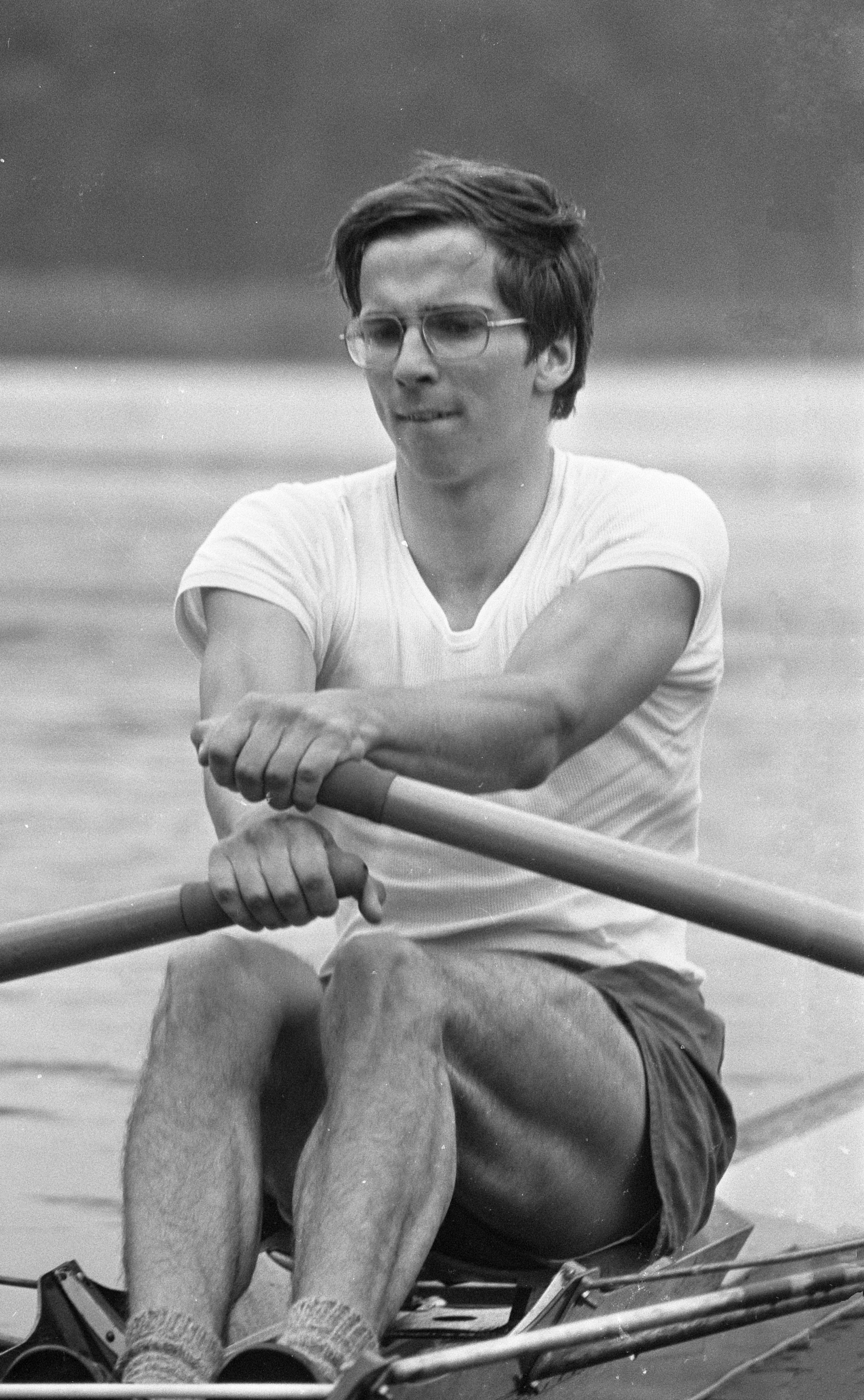
- Jan Bruyn in 1972

Personal information
- Born: 9 October 1948 (age 77) The Hague, the Netherlands
- Height: 1.83 m (6 ft 0 in)
- Weight: 75 kg (165 lb)

Sport
- Sport: Rowing
- Club: Skadi, Rotterdam

Jannes Albert "Jan" Bruyn (born 9 October 1948) is a retired Dutch rower. He competed at the 1972 Summer Olympics in the double sculls event, together with Paul Veenemans, and finished in seventh place.
