= Roland Thibaut =

French rower

Personal information
- Nationality: French
- Born: 27 April 1946 (age 78)

Sport
- Sport: Rowing

Roland Thibaut (born 27 April 1946) is a French rower. He competed at the 1972 Summer Olympics and the 1976 Summer Olympics.
