= Uli Schmied =

German rower

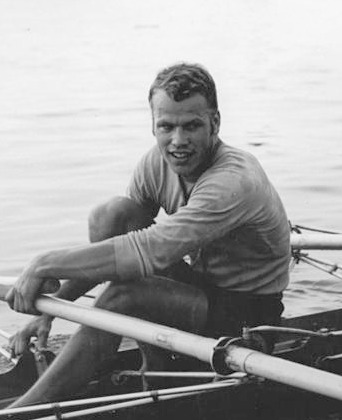
- Schmied in 1970

Personal information
- Full name: Hans-Ulrich Schmied
- Born: 23 February 1947 (age 79) Meißen, Germany
- Height: 1.87 m (6 ft 2 in)
- Weight: 84 kg (185 lb)
- Spouse: Bärbel Bendiks

Sport
- Sport: Rowing
- Club: SC Berlin-Grünau
Medal record
Men's rowing
Representing East Germany
Olympic Games
Bronze medal – third place	1972 Munich	Double sculls
Bronze medal – third place	1976 Montreal	Double sculls
World Championships
Gold medal – first place	1974 Lucerne	Double sculls
Silver medal – second place	1970 St. Catharines	Double sculls
Silver medal – second place	1977 Amsterdam	Double sculls
European Championships
Gold medal – first place	1971 Copenhagen	Double sculls
Gold medal – first place	1973 Moscow	Double sculls

Hans-Ulrich Schmied (born 23 February 1947) is a retired German rower who specialized in the double sculls. In this event he won bronze medals at the 1972 and 1976 Olympic Games and finished in fifth place in 1968. He also won one world (1974) and two European titles (1971 and 1973). Schmied went to the 1978 World Rowing Championships on Lake Karapiro in New Zealand as a reserve but did not compete. It was at those championships that he got closer to one of the female rowers whom she later married; Bärbel Bendiks was also present as a reserve.

After retiring from competitions he worked as a rowing coach, particularly with Arno Bergmann, Erwin Krakau and Gerhard Rothe.
