= Arthur Heyne =

German rower

Personal information
- Nationality: German
- Born: 25 August 1946 (age 78); Kaiserslautern, Germany

Sport
- Sport: Rowing

Arthur Heyne (born 25 August 1946) is a German rower. He competed in the men's double sculls event at the 1972 Summer Olympics.
