= Zdzisław Bromek =

Polish rower

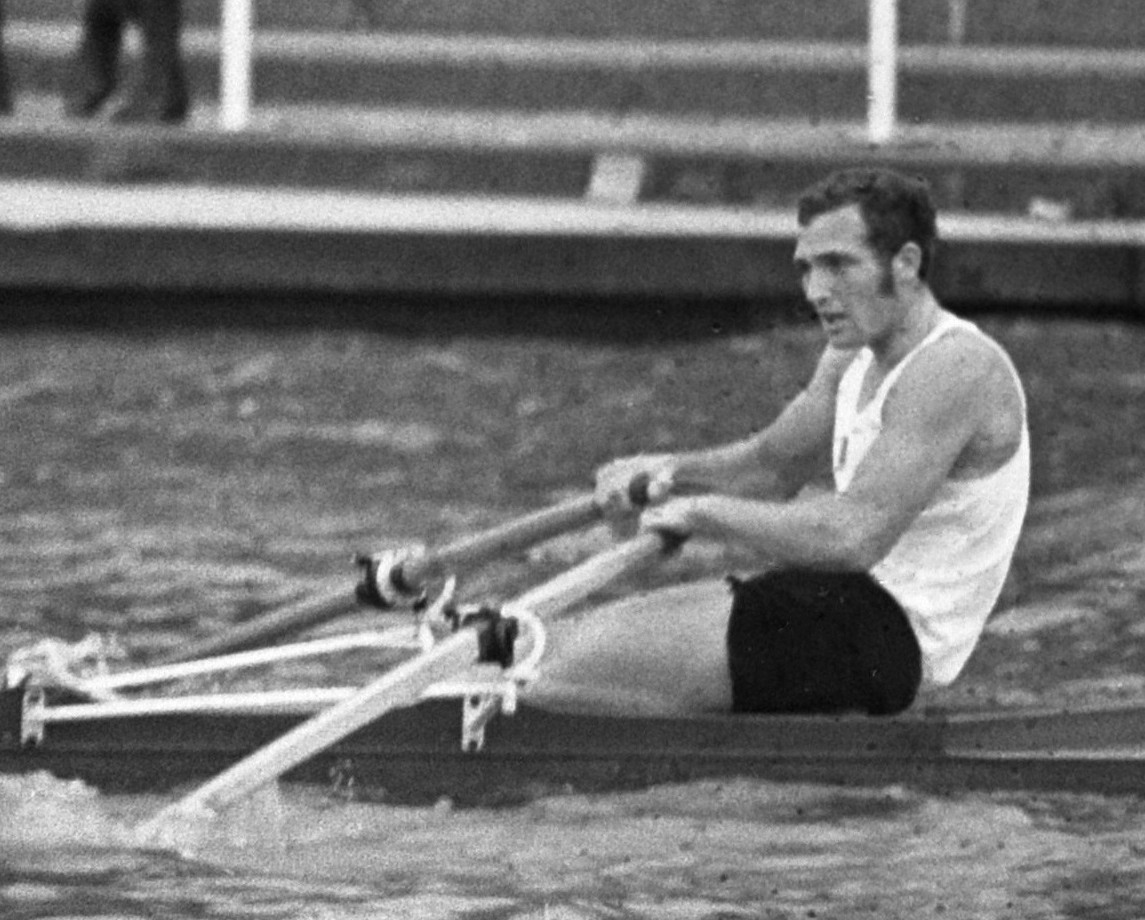
- Zdzisław Bromek in 1970

Personal information
- Born: 18 November 1945 (age 80) Kraków, Poland
- Height: 1.87 m (6 ft 2 in)
- Weight: 84 kg (185 lb)

Sport
- Sport: Rowing
- Club: AZS Kraków

Zdzisław Bromek (born 18 November 1945) is a retired Polish rower who specialized in the single sculls. In this event he won eight national titles (1968–1974 and 1976) and finished in seventh place at the 1968 Summer Olympics.
