= Thomas McKibbon =

American rower

Personal information
- Born: October 29, 1939 (age 86) Detroit, Michigan, United States

Sport
- Sport: Rowing

Thomas McKibbon (born October 29, 1939) is an American former rower. He was the national singles champion in 1968 and a member of the 1968 U.S. Olympic team in Mexico City and each subsequent Olympic team through the 1988 Games. He and John Van Blom won the gold medal in men's double sculls at the European Championships in Klagenfurt, Austria, in 1969, and at the Henley Royal Regatta in 1970. They also rowed in the men's double sculls at the 1972 Summer Olympics. Beginning in 1970 he established and coached an elite team of women scullers at the Long Beach Rowing Association. His technical expertise and deep personal commitment made him a successful and beloved coach. Many of his rowers medaled in international competition, including Joan Lind (Van Blom) at the 1976 Olympics in Montreal, and many have gone on to be well-regarded coaches in their own right.
