= Josef Straka (rower, born 1904) =

Czechoslovak rower

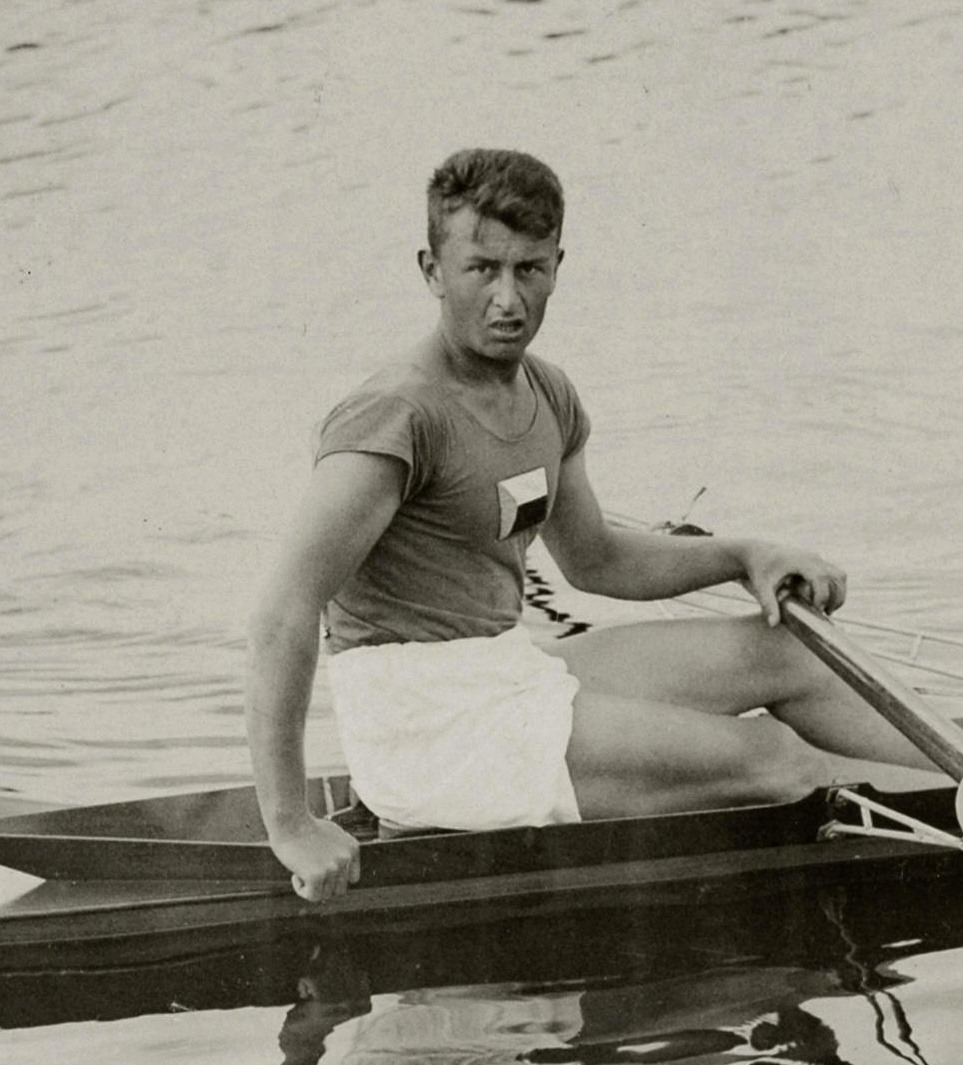
- Joseph Straka at the 1928 Olympics

Personal information
- Born: 14 July 1904 Mělník, Austria-Hungary
- Died: 29 June 1976 (aged 71) Litoměřice, Czechoslovakia

Sport
- Sport: Rowing
Medal record
Representing Czechoslovakia
European Rowing Championships
Bronze medal – third place	1925 Prague	Double sculls
Bronze medal – third place	1927 Como	Single sculls
Silver medal – second place	1929 Bydgoszcz	Single sculls
Bronze medal – third place	1932 Belgrade	Coxed four

Josef Straka (14 July 1904 – 29 June 1976) was a Czechoslovak rower who won one silver and three bronze medals at the European championships of 1925–1932. He competed at the 1928 and 1936 Olympics in the single and double sculls, respectively, but failed to reach the finals. His son was also named Josef Straka and was also an Olympic rower.
