= Jørgen Engelbrecht =

Danish rower (born 1946)

Personal information
- Born: 24 April 1946 (age 80) Hvidovre, Denmark
- Height: 1.89 m (6 ft 2 in)
- Weight: 80 kg (176 lb)

Sport
- Sport: Rowing
- Club: Hvidovre Roklub
Medal record
Men's rowing
Representing Denmark
World Rowing Championships
Gold medal – first place	1970 St. Catharines	Double sculls

Jørgen Engelbrecht (born 24 April 1946) is a Danish retired rower. Together with Niels Henry Secher, he won a world title at the 1970 World Rowing Championships and finished fourth at the 1972 Summer Olympics in the double sculls event.
