= Manfred Krausbar =

Austrian rower

Personal information
- Nationality: Austrian
- Born: 27 July 1942 (age 82); Linz, Austria

Sport
- Sport: Rowing

Manfred Krausbar (born 27 July 1942) is an Austrian rower. He competed at the 1964 Summer Olympics, 1968 Summer Olympics and the 1972 Summer Olympics.
