= John Van Blom =

American rower

Personal information
- Born: December 1, 1947 (age 78) Long Beach, California, United States
- Spouse: Joan Lind

Sport
- Sport: Rowing

John Van Blom (born December 1, 1947) is an American rower. He competed at the 1968 Summer Olympics, 1972 Summer Olympics and the 1976 Summer Olympics. He was married to the sculler Joan Lind.
