= Claude Dehombreux =

Belgian rower

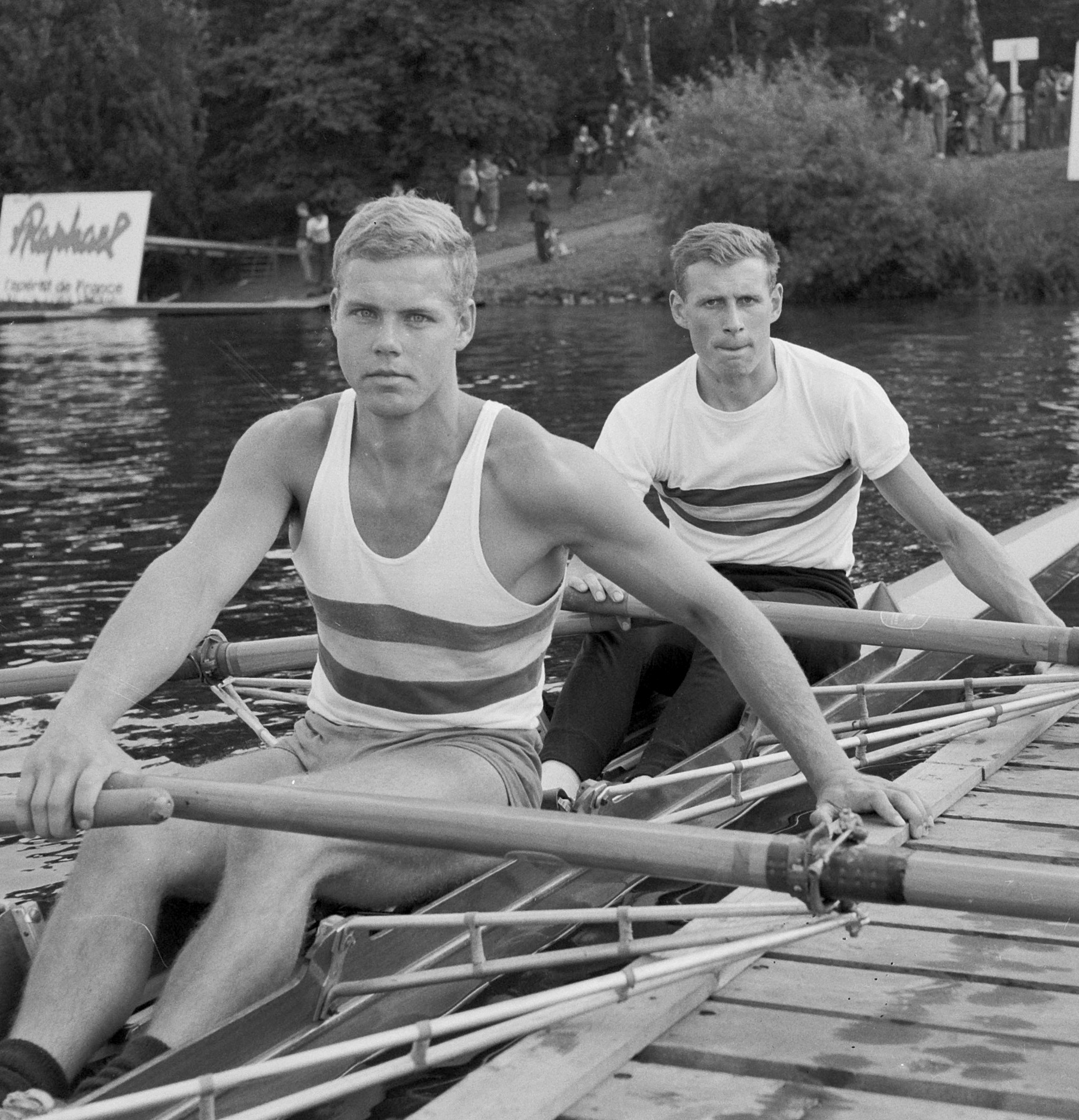
- Michel De Meulemeester and Claude Dehombreux (right) in 1965

Personal information
- Born: 14 October 1939 Ixelles, Belgium
- Died: 31 December 2010 (aged 71) Brussels, Belgium
- Height: 1.90 m (6 ft 3 in)
- Weight: 85 kg (187 lb)

Sport
- Sport: Rowing
- Club: RSNB, Bruxelles

Claude Dehombreux (14 October 1939 – 31 December 2010) was the best Belgian rower of the 1960s–1970s, winning 30 national titles in skiff events. He competed at the 1968, 1972 and 1976 Summer Olympics in single, double and single sculls, respectively, with the best result of ninth place in 1972. After retiring from competitions he worked as a rowing coach.
