= Niels Henry Secher =

Danish rower (born 1946)

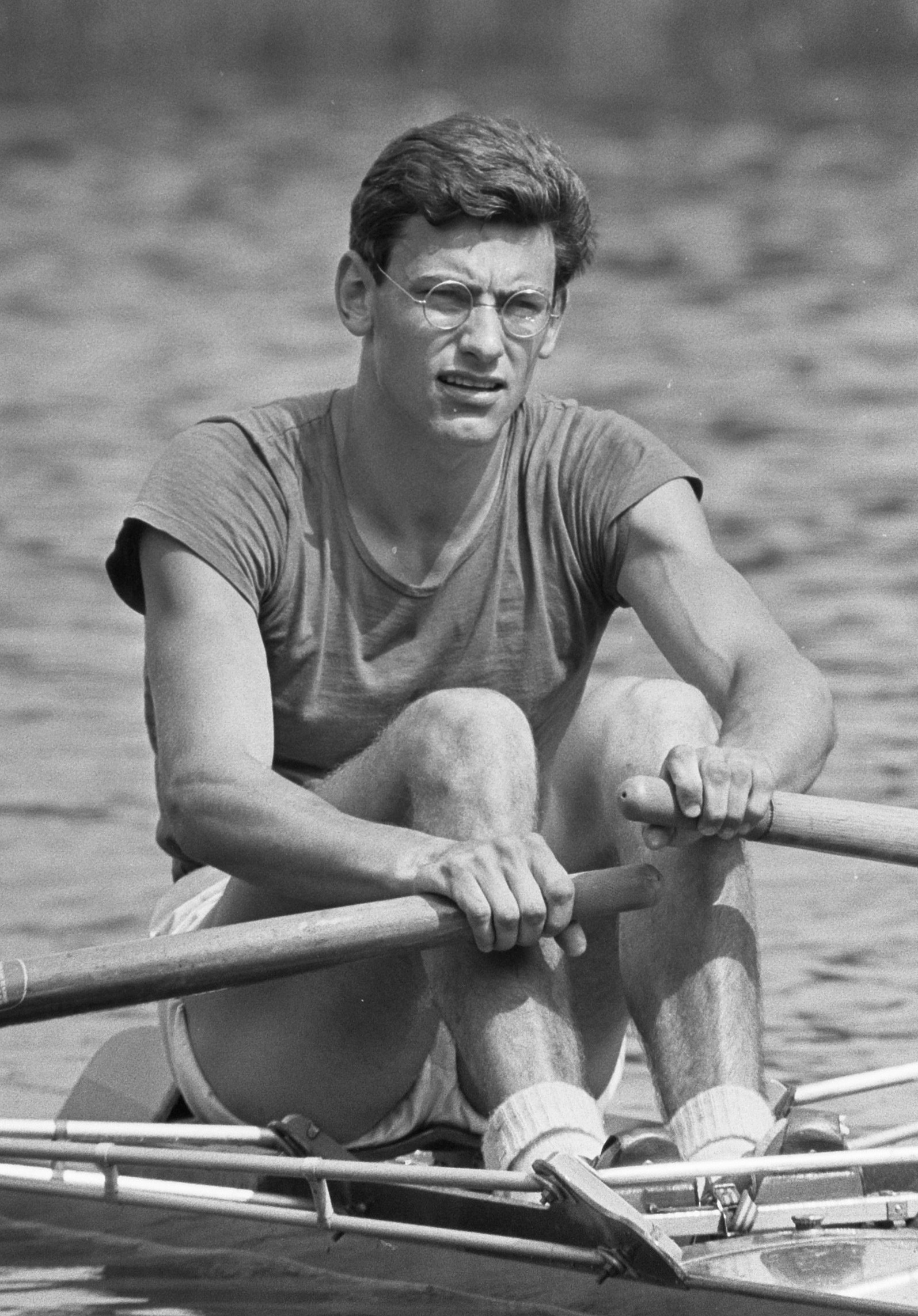
- Niels Henry Secher in 1968

Personal information
- Born: 24 June 1946 (age 80) Frederiksberg, Denmark
- Height: 1.93 m (6 ft 4 in)
- Weight: 92 kg (203 lb)

Sport
- Sport: Rowing
- Club: DSR, Copenhagen
Medal record
Representing Denmark
World Rowing Championships
| Gold medal – first place | 1970 St. Catharines | Double sculls |

Niels Henry Secher (born 24 June 1946) is a Danish medical research scientist and retired rower. Together with Jørgen Engelbrecht, he won a world title at the 1970 World Rowing Championships and finished fourth at the 1972 Summer Olympics in the double sculls event. In the single sculls, he placed eights at the 1968 Summer Olympics.

After retiring from competitions Secher focused on medical research, becoming professor and head of the Cardiovascular Research Laboratory at Rigshospitalet, part of Copenhagen University Hospital. His research is focused on brain blood flow and oxygenation.
