= Jean-Noël Ribot =

French rower

Personal information
- Nationality: French
- Born: 26 December 1949 (age 76)

Sport
- Sport: Rowing

Jean-Noël Ribot (French: [ʒɑ̃ nɔɛl ʁibo]; born 26 December 1949) is a French rower. He competed at the 1972 Summer Olympics and the 1976 Summer Olympics.
