= Josef Straka (rower, born 1948) =

Czech rower

Personal information
- Born: 4 June 1948 (age 78) Prague, Czechoslovakia
- Height: 1.90 m (6 ft 3 in)
- Weight: 89 kg (196 lb)

Sport
- Sport: Rowing

Josef Straka (born 4 June 1948) is a retired Czech rower. He competed at the 1972 and 1976 Olympics in the double sculls and finished in sixth and tenth place, respectively. He finished fourth and sixths in the same event at the world championships of 1975 and 1977, respectively. His father was also named Josef Straka and was also an Olympic rower.
