= Rowing at the 1972 Summer Olympics – Men's single sculls =

Olympic rowing event

Men's single sculls at the Games of the XX Olympiad
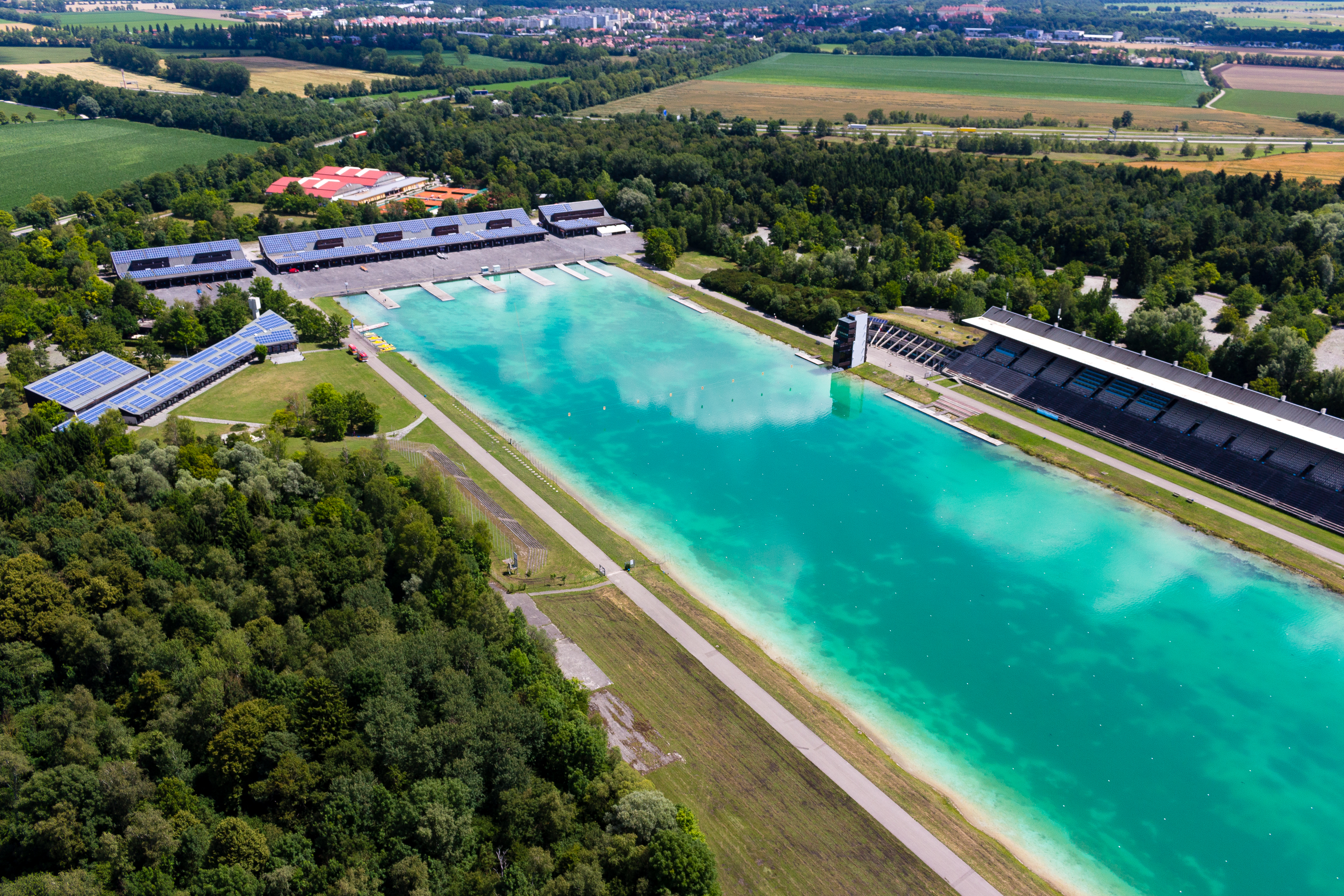
- Aerial view of the venue in Oberschleißheim
- Venue: Oberschleißheim Regatta Course
- Dates: 27 August – 2 September 1972
- Competitors: 18 from 18 nations
- Winning time: 7:10.12

Medalists
1st place, gold medalist(s)		Yury Malyshev; Soviet Union
2nd place, silver medalist(s)		Alberto Demiddi; Argentina
3rd place, bronze medalist(s)		Wolfgang Güldenpfennig; East Germany

The men's single sculls competition at the 1972 Summer Olympics in Munich took place from 27 August to 2 September at the Olympic Reggatta Course in Oberschleißheim. There were 18 competitors from 18 nations, with each nation limited to a single boat in the event. The event was won by Yury Malyshev of the Soviet Union, the nation's fifth victory in the event; the Soviets returned to the top of the podium after having their four-Games (1952–1964) winning streak broken in 1968. Alberto Demiddi of Argentina took silver, the seventh man to win multiple medals in the single sculls (adding to his 1968 bronze). Wolfgang Güldenpfennig earned bronze, the first medal for East Germany as a separate team (East German rower Achim Hill had won two gold medals for the United Team of Germany in 1960 and 1964).

== Background ==
This was the 16th appearance of the event. Rowing had been on the programme in 1896 but was cancelled due to bad weather. The single sculls has been held every time that rowing has been contested, beginning in 1900.

Two of the 17 single scullers from the 1968 Games returned: bronze medalist (and 1964 fourth-place finisher) Alberto Demiddi of Argentina and sixth-place finisher Kenny Dwan of Great Britain. Demiddi was favored in Munich; along with his prior Olympic experience, he was the reigning (1970) World Champion, a two-time (1967 and 1971) Pan American champion, and the 1971 Diamond Challenge Sculls winner.

Bermuda, Bulgaria, Ireland, and Portugal each made their debut in the event. Great Britain made its 14th appearance, most among nations, after missing only its second edition of the event in 1964.

== Competition format ==
This rowing event was a single scull event, meaning that each boat was propelled by a single rower. The "scull" portion means that the rower used two oars, one on each side of the boat. The course used the 2000 metres distance that became the Olympic standard in 1912.

The tournament used the four-round format (three main rounds and a repechage) that had been used in 1968. The competition continued to use the six-boat heat standardised in 1960 as well as the "B" final for ranking 7th through 12th place introduced in 1964.

- Quarterfinals: Three heats of 6 boats each. The top boat in each heat (3 total) advanced directly to the semifinals. The remaining boats (15 total) went to the repechage.
- Repechage: Three heats of 5 each. The top three boats of each heat (9 total) rejoined the quarterfinal winners in the semifinals. The other boats (6 total) were eliminated.
- Semifinals: Two heats of 6 boats each. The top three boats in each heat (6 total) advanced to Final A, the remaining boats (6 total) went to Final B.
- Final: Two finals. Final A consisted of the top 6 boats. Final B placed boats 7 through 12.

== Schedule ==
All times are Central European Time (UTC+1)

Date	Time	Round
Sunday, 27 August 1972	9:00	Quarterfinals
Tuesday, 29 August 1972	9:00	Repechage
Thursday, 31 August 1972	11:30	Semifinals
Friday, 1 September 1972	10:00	Final B
Saturday, 2 September 1972	11:00	Final A

== Results ==
=== Quarterfinals ===
The winner of each of the three heats qualified for the semifinal round, while the remainder went to the repechage.

==== Quarterfinal 1 ====
Rank	Rower	Nation	Time	Notes
1	Alberto Demiddi	Argentina	7:46.09	Q
2	Udo Hild	West Germany	7:48.12	R
3	Melchior Bürgin	Switzerland	8:00.20	R
4	Janis Rodmanis	Chile	8:23.38	R
5	James Butterfield	Bermuda	8:29.20	R
6	Guillermo Spamer	Mexico	8:38.63	R

==== Quarterfinal 2 ====
Rank	Rower	Nation	Time	Notes
1	Yury Malyshev	Soviet Union	7:42.67	Q
2	Wolfgang Güldenpfennig	East Germany	7:46.31	R
3	Seán Drea	Ireland	7:47.64	R
4	Jim Dietz	United States	7:57.85	R
5	Jaroslav Hellebrand	Czechoslovakia	7:58.15	R
6	Lennart Bälter	Sweden	8:12.92	R

==== Quarterfinal 3 ====
Rank	Rower	Nation	Time	Notes
1	Yordan Valchev	Bulgaria	7:50.29	Q
2	Murray Watkinson	New Zealand	7:51.29	R
3	Kenny Dwan	Great Britain	7:57.49	R
4	Kim Børgesen	Denmark	7:58.94	R
5	Hideo Okamoto	Japan	8:20.82	R
6	José Margues	Portugal	8:39.73	R

=== Repechage ===
The top three finishers in each heat qualified for the semifinal round.

==== Repechage heat 1 ====
Rank	Rower	Nation	Time	Notes
1	Udo Hild	West Germany	7:48.11	Q
2	Seán Drea	Ireland	7:50.27	Q
3	Kim Børgesen	Denmark	7:56.66	Q
4	Lennart Bälter	Sweden	8:11.07	
5	James Butterfield	Bermuda	8:26.16	

==== Repechage heat 2 ====
Rank	Rower	Nation	Time	Notes
1	Wolfgang Güldenpfennig	East Germany	8:05.19	Q
2	Kenny Dwan	Great Britain	8:10.32	Q
3	Jaroslav Hellebrand	Czechoslovakia	8:19.28	Q
4	Janis Rodmanis	Chile	8:29.66	
5	José Margues	Portugal	8:54.27	

==== Repechage heat 3 ====
Rank	Rower	Nation	Time	Notes
1	Jim Dietz	United States	7:59.13	Q
2	Melchior Bürgin	Switzerland	8:04.81	Q
3	Murray Watkinson	New Zealand	8:11.51	Q
4	Hideo Okamoto	Japan	8:27.36	
5	Guillermo Spamer	Mexico	8:40.76	

=== Semifinals ===
The first three in each semifinal heat qualified for Final A, with the remainder going to Final B.

==== Semifinal 1 ====
Rank	Rower	Nation	Time	Notes
1	Alberto Demiddi	Argentina	8:10.01	QA
2	Wolfgang Güldenpfennig	East Germany	8:16.35	QA
3	Melchior Bürgin	Switzerland	8:16.95	QA
4	Yordan Valchev	Bulgaria	8:17.64	QB
5	Seán Drea	Ireland	8:27.70	QB
6	Jaroslav Hellebrand	Czechoslovakia	8:44.60	QB

==== Semifinal 2 ====
Rank	Rower	Nation	Time	Notes
1	Yury Malyshev	Soviet Union	8:13.49	QA
2	Jim Dietz	United States	8:21.54	QA
3	Udo Hild	West Germany	8:26.37	QA
4	Kim Børgesen	Denmark	8:27.93	QB
5	Murray Watkinson	New Zealand	8:30.88	QB
6	Kenny Dwan	Great Britain	8:38.62	QB

=== Finals ===
==== Final B ====
Rank	Rower	Nation	Time
7	Seán Drea	Ireland	7:55.33
8	Yordan Valchev	Bulgaria	7:59.55
9	Kenny Dwan	Great Britain	8:00.38
10	Murray Watkinson	New Zealand	8:05.42
11	Kim Børgesen	Denmark	8:09.04
12	Jaroslav Hellebrand	Czechoslovakia	8:11.04

==== Final A ====
Rank	Rower	Nation	Time
1st place, gold medalist(s)	Yury Malyshev	Soviet Union	7:10.12
2nd place, silver medalist(s)	Alberto Demiddi	Argentina	7:11.53
3rd place, bronze medalist(s)	Wolfgang Güldenpfennig	East Germany	7:14.45
4	Udo Hild	West Germany	7:20.81
5	Jim Dietz	United States	7:24.81
6	Melchior Bürgin	Switzerland	7:31.99

== Results summary ==
Rank	Rower	Nation	Quarterfinals	Repechage	Semifinals	Finals
1st place, gold medalist(s)	Yury Malyshev	Soviet Union	7:42.67	Bye	8:13.49	7:10.12; Final A
2nd place, silver medalist(s)	Alberto Demiddi	Argentina	7:46.09	Bye	8:10.01	7:11.53; Final A
3rd place, bronze medalist(s)	Wolfgang Güldenpfennig	East Germany	7:46.31	8:05.19	8:16.35	7:14.45; Final A
4	Udo Hild	West Germany	7:48.12	7:48.11	8:26.37	7:20.81; Final A
5	Jim Dietz	United States	7:57.85	7:59.13	8:21.54	7:24.81; Final A
6	Melchior Bürgin	Switzerland	8:00.20	8:04.81	8:16.95	7:31.99; Final A
7	Seán Drea	Ireland	7:47.64	7:50.27	8:27.70	7:55.33; Final B
8	Yordan Valchev	Bulgaria	7:50.29	Bye	8:17.64	7:59.55; Final B
9	Kenny Dwan	Great Britain	7:57.49	8:10.32	8:38.62	8:00.38; Final B
10	Murray Watkinson	New Zealand	7:51.29	8:11.51	8:30.88	8:05.42; Final B
11	Kim Børgesen	Denmark	7:58.94	7:56.66	8:27.93	8:09.04; Final B
12	Jaroslav Hellebrand	Czechoslovakia	7:58.15	8:19.28	8:44.60	8:11.04; Final B
13	Lennart Bälter	Sweden	8:12.92	8:11.07	Did not advance	
14	James Butterfield	Bermuda	8:29.20	8:26.16	Did not advance	
15	Hideo Okamoto	Japan	8:20.82	8:27.36	Did not advance	
16	Janis Rodmanis	Chile	8:23.38	8:29.66	Did not advance	
17	Guillermo Spamer	Mexico	8:38.63	8:40.76	Did not advance	
18	José Margues	Portugal	8:39.73	8:54.27	Did not advance	
