= Rowing at the 1968 Summer Olympics – Men's double sculls =

Men's double sculls at the Games of the XIX Olympiad
- Date: 13–19 October 1968
- Competitors: 27 from 13 nations

Medalists
1st place, gold medalist(s)		Aleksandr Timoshinin; Anatoliy Sass	Soviet Union
2nd place, silver medalist(s)		Harry Droog; Leendert van Dis	Netherlands
3rd place, bronze medalist(s)		John Nunn; Bill Maher	United States

The men's double sculls competition at the 1968 Summer Olympics took place at took place at Virgilio Uribe Rowing and Canoeing Course, Mexico.

== Competition format ==
This rowing competition consisted of three main rounds (heats, semifinals, and finals), as well as a repechage round that allowed teams that did not win their heats to advance to the semifinals. All races were 2,000 metres in distance.

- Heats: Three heats. With 13 boats entered, there were four or five boats per heat. The top three boats in each heat (total of 9 boats) advanced directly to the semifinals; all other boats (4 boats) went to the repechage.
- Repechage: One heat. There were 4 boats in the repechage. The top three boats advanced to the semifinals. The last-place boat was eliminated.
- Semifinals: Two heats. Each heat consisted of 6 boats. The top three boats in each heat advanced to the final; the other three boats in each heat were sent to a 7th–12th place classification race.
- Finals: A main final and a 7th–12th place classification race.

== Results ==
=== Heats ===
==== Heat 1 ====
Rank	Rowers	Nation	Time	Notes
1	Bill Maher; John Nunn	United States	6:56.96	Q
2	Alexandru Aposteanu; Octavian Pavelescu	Romania	6:58.88	Q
3	Wolfgang Glock; Udo Hild	West Germany	6:59.70	Q
4	Otto Plettner; Ricardo Scheffler	Mexico	7:02.18	R
5	Edgard Gijsen; Harri Klein	Brazil	7:16.70	R

==== Heat 2 ====
Rank	Rowers	Nation	Time	Notes
1	Yordan Valchev; Atanas Zhelev	Bulgaria	6:54.16	Q
2	Leendert van Dis; Harry Droog	Netherlands	6:56.09	Q
3	Manfred Haake; Uli Schmied	East Germany	6:59.32	Q
4	Melchior Bürgin; Martin Studach	Switzerland	6:59.52	R

==== Heat 3 ====
Rank	Rowers	Nation	Time	Notes
1	Anatoliy Sass; Aleksandr Timoshinin	Soviet Union	7:07.46	Q
2	Jaroslav Hellebrand; Petr Krátký	Czechoslovakia	7:10.35	Q
3	Jean-Marc Porte; Gilbert Vallanchon	France	7:10.72	Q
4	Daryl Sturdy Robert Stubbs	Canada	7:36.52	R

=== Repechage ===
Rank	Rowers	Nation	Time	Notes
1	Melchior Bürgin; Hans Ruckstuhl	Switzerland	7:07.09	Q
2	Edgard Gijsen; Harri Klein	Brazil	7:08.46	Q
3	Otto Plettner; Ricardo Scheffler	Mexico	7:11.43	Q
4	Daryl Sturdy Robert Stubbs	Canada	7:22.87	

=== Semifinals ===
==== Semifinal 1 ====
Rank	Rowers	Nation	Time	Notes
1	Manfred Haake; Uli Schmied	East Germany	7:07.86	Q
2	Yordan Valchev; Atanas Zhelev	Bulgaria	7:12.08	Q
3	Anatoliy Sass; Aleksandr Timoshinin	Soviet Union	7:12.41	Q
4	Melchior Bürgin; Hans Ruckstuhl	Switzerland	7:14.74	C
5	Jean-Marc Porte; Gilbert Vallanchon	France	9:54.48	C
6	Alexandru Aposteanu; Octavian Pavelescu	Romania	10:53.17	C

==== Semifinal 2 ====
Rank	Rowers	Nation	Time	Notes
1	Bill Maher; John Nunn	United States	7:10.05	Q
2	Wolfgang Glock; Udo Hild	West Germany	7:11.56	Q
3	Leendert van Dis; Harry Droog	Netherlands	7:13.74	Q
4	Otto Plettner; Ricardo Scheffler	Mexico	7:15.20	C
5	Edgard Gijsen; Harri Klein	Brazil	7:17.08	C
6	Jaroslav Hellebrand; Petr Krátký	Czechoslovakia	ST	C

=== Finals ===
==== Classification 7–12 ====
Rank	Rowers	Nation	Time
7	Edgard Gijsen; Harri Klein	Brazil	7:04.13
8	Alexandru Aposteanu; Octavian Pavelescu	Romania	7:08.27
9	Jean-Marc Porte; Gilbert Vallanchon	France	7:08.49
10	Otto Plettner; Ricardo Scheffler	Mexico	7:09.90
11	Melchior Bürgin; Hans Ruckstuhl	Switzerland	7:12.72
12	Jaroslav Hellebrand; Petr Krátký	Czechoslovakia	7:25.14

==== Final ====
Rank	Rowers	Nation	Time
1st place, gold medalist(s)	Anatoliy Sass; Aleksandr Timoshinin	Soviet Union	6:51.82
2nd place, silver medalist(s)	Leendert van Dis; Harry Droog	Netherlands	6:52.80
3rd place, bronze medalist(s)	Bill Maher; John Nunn	United States	6:54.21
4	Yordan Valchev; Atanas Zhelev	Bulgaria	6:58.48
5	Manfred Haake; Uli Schmied	East Germany	7:04.92
6	Wolfgang Glock; Udo Hild	West Germany	7:12.20
