= Rowing at the 1964 Summer Olympics – Men's single sculls =

Olympic rowing event

Men's single sculls at the Games of the XVIII Olympiad
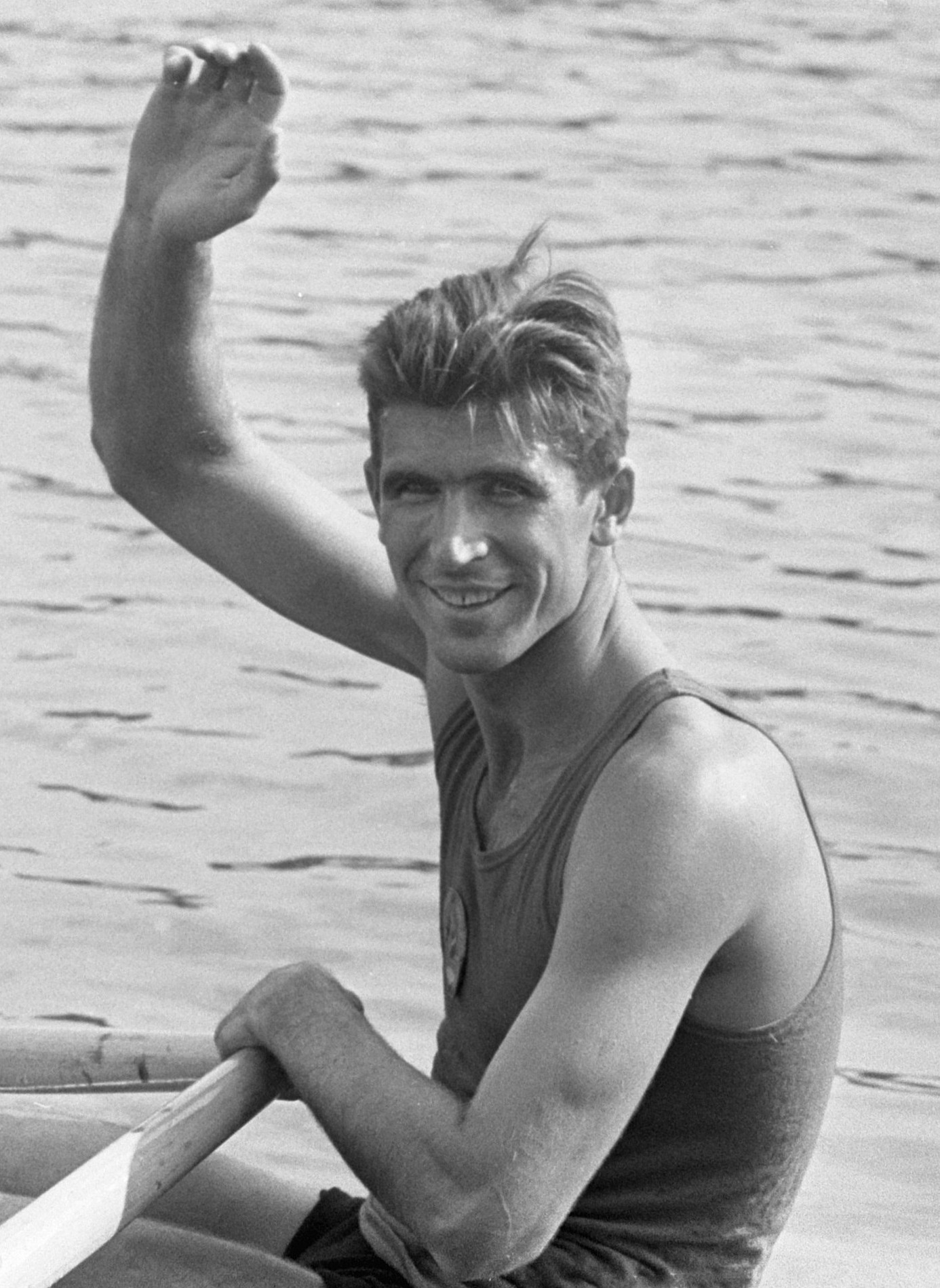
- Gold medalist Vyacheslav Ivanov (at the 1964 European championships)
- Venue: Toda Rowing Course
- Dates: 11–15 October 1964
- Competitors: 13 from 13 nations
- Winning time: 8:22.51

Medalists
1st place, gold medalist(s)		Vyacheslav Ivanov; Soviet Union
2nd place, silver medalist(s)		Achim Hill; United Team of Germany
3rd place, bronze medalist(s)		Gottfried Kottmann; Switzerland

The men's single sculls event was a rowing event conducted as part of the Rowing at the 1964 Summer Olympics programme. It was held from 11 to 15 October at the Toda Rowing Course. There were 13 competitors from 13 nations, with each nation limited to a single boat in the event. The event was won by Vyacheslav Ivanov of the Soviet Union, his third consecutive victory (and the fourth for the Soviet Union) in the event. Ivanov's three gold medals in the event remains (through the 2016 Games) tied for the best results for any individual single sculler (with Pertti Karppinen); only Ekaterina Karsten has more medals in (women's) single sculls, though she took only two golds along with a silver and a bronze. The second spot on the podium was also a repeat of 1960; Achim Hill of the United Team of Germany became the sixth man to win multiple single sculls medals by repeating as silver medalist. Bronze this time went to Gottfried Kottmann of Switzerland, that nation's first medal in the event since 1924.

== Background ==
This was the 14th appearance of the event. Rowing had been on the programme in 1896 but was cancelled due to bad weather. The single sculls has been held every time that rowing has been contested, beginning in 1900.

Only two of the 13 single scullers from the 1960 Games returned, but they were the top two: gold medalist Vyacheslav Ivanov of the Soviet Union and silver medalist Achim Hill of the United Team of Germany. Ivanov had won gold in 1956 as well, along with the 1959, 1961, and 1964 European championships and the inaugural World Championship in 1962. He was a prohibitive favorite to take a third gold medal in the event, especially with the absence of the two strongest potential challengers: New Zealand's James Hill (who had followed a fourth-place finish at the 1960 Games with British Empire and Commonwealth Games championships), who was not in Tokyo, and the United States' Seymour Cromwell (reigning Pan American and Diamond Challenge Sculls champion), who competed only in the double sculls. Long-shot challengers included Achim Hill, Gottfried Kottmann of Switzerland (1963 Diamond Challenge winner), and Vaclav Kozak of Czechoslovakia (1963 European champion); very long-shot challengers were Rob Groen of the Netherlands (runner-up to Kozak and then Ivanov at the European championships in 1963 and 1964) and Alberto Demiddi of Argentina (second to Cromwell at the 1964 Diamond Challenge Sculls).

For the second consecutive Games, no nations made their debut in the event. The United States made its 11th appearance, most among nations competing but one behind Great Britain which was missing the event for only the second time.

== Competition format ==
This rowing event was a single scull event, meaning that each boat was propelled by a single rower. The "scull" portion means that the rower used two oars, one on each side of the boat. The course used the 2000 metres distance that became the Olympic standard in 1912.

The 1964 tournament introduced the "B" final, a consolation final that ranked rowers that had not qualified for the main, or "A", final. As in 1960, there were three rounds: semifinals, a repechage, and the final round. Six boats had become a standard final size in 1960 and continued here.

- Semifinals: Three heats of 4 or 5 boats each. The top boat in each heat advanced to Final A, the remaining boats (10 total) went to the repechage.
- Repechage: Three heats of 3 or 4 boats each. The winner of each heat rejoined the semifinal winners in Final A. The format called for the 2nd and 3rd place boat in each repechage heat to compete in Final B, with the one 4th-place boat in the large heat placing 13th. However, two qualified boats did not compete in Final B and the 4th-place boat did.
- Final: Two finals. Final A consisted of the top 6 boats. Final B was intended to place boats 7 through 12, though only 5 boats started.

== Schedule ==
All times are Japan Standard Time (UTC+9)

Date	Time	Round
Sunday, 11 October 1964	14:00	Semifinals
Monday, 12 October 1964	16:00	Repechage
Wednesday, 14 October 1964	14:40	Final B
Thursday, 15 October 1964	14:30	Final A

== Results ==
=== Semifinals ===
The top rower in each heat advanced to Final A, with all others sent to the repechages.

==== Semifinal 1 ====
Rank	Rower	Nation	Time	Notes
1	Achim Hill	United Team of Germany	7:40.49	QA
2	Vaclav Kozak	Czechoslovakia	7:45.75	R
3	Rob Groen	Netherlands	7:48.74	R
4	Peter Edwards	Australia	7:53.54	R
5	Otto Plettner	Mexico	8:03.86	R

==== Semifinal 2 ====
Rank	Rower	Nation	Time	Notes
1	Donald Spero	United States	7:41.94	QA
2	Vyacheslav Ivanov	Soviet Union	7:53.55	R
3	Alberto Demiddi	Argentina	7:55.59	R
4	Satoomi Kasagi	Japan	8:16.96	R

==== Semifinal 3 ====
Rank	Rower	Nation	Time	Notes
1	Gottfried Kottmann	Switzerland	7:43.70	QA
2	Murray Watkinson	New Zealand	7:49.01	R
3	Eugeniusz Kubiak	Poland	8:08.96	R
4	Leif Gotfredsen	Canada	8:15.30	R

=== Repechage ===
The top finisher in each of the three repechage heats joined the finalists. The second and third-place finishers competed in a consolation final for 7th-12th places. The fourth-place finisher, in the only repechage with that many competitors, was supposed to be eliminated; however, Plettner competed in Final B while Kozak and Kubiak did not.

==== Repechage heat 1 ====
Rank	Rower	Nation	Time	Notes
1	Murray Watkinson	New Zealand	7:45.28	QA
2	Rob Groen	Netherlands	7:50.58	QB
3	Kasagi Satoomi	Japan	8:13.44	QB

==== Repechage heat 2 ====
Rank	Rower	Nation	Time	Notes
1	Alberto Demiddi	Argentina	7:39.67	QA
2	Vaclav Kozak	Czechoslovakia	7:42.56	QB
3	Leif Gotfredsen	Canada	8:02.72	QB

==== Repechage heat 3 ====
Rank	Rower	Nation	Time	Notes
1	Vyacheslav Ivanov	Soviet Union	7:31.76	QA
2	Peter Edwards	Australia	7:37.64	QB
3	Eugeniusz Kubiak	Poland	7:44.75	QB
4	Otto Plettner	Mexico	7:46.84	QB

=== Finals ===
==== Final B ====
The consolation final determined places from 7th to 12th.

Rank	Rower	Nation	Time
7	Rob Groen	Netherlands	7:17.50
8	Leif Gotfredsen	Canada	7:28.70
9	Peter Edwards	Australia	7:30.06
10	Otto Plettner	Mexico	7:33.24
11	Kasagi Satoomi	Japan	7:37.90
—	Vaclav Kozak	Czechoslovakia	DNS
—	Eugeniusz Kubiak	Poland	DNS

==== Final A ====
Rank	Rower	Nation	Time
1st place, gold medalist(s)	Vyacheslav Ivanov	Soviet Union	8:22.51
2nd place, silver medalist(s)	Achim Hill	United Team of Germany	8:26.24
3rd place, bronze medalist(s)	Gottfried Kottmann	Switzerland	8:29.68
4	Alberto Demiddi	Argentina	8:31.51
5	Murray Watkinson	New Zealand	8:35.57
6	Donald Spero	United States	8:37.53

== Results summary ==
Rank	Rower	Nation	Semifinals	Repechage	Finals
1st place, gold medalist(s)	Vyacheslav Ivanov	Soviet Union	7:53.55	7:31.76	8:22.51; Final A
2nd place, silver medalist(s)	Achim Hill	United Team of Germany	7:40.49	Bye	8:26.24; Final A
3rd place, bronze medalist(s)	Gottfried Kottmann	Switzerland	7:43.70	Bye	8:29.68; Final A
4	Alberto Demiddi	Argentina	7:55.59	7:39.67	8:31.51; Final A
5	Murray Watkinson	New Zealand	7:49.01	7:45.28	8:35.57; Final A
6	Donald Spero	United States	7:41.94	Bye	8:37.53; Final A
7	Rob Groen	Netherlands	7:48.74	7:50.58	7:17.50; Final B
8	Leif Gotfredsen	Canada	8:15.30	8:02.72	7:28.70; Final B
9	Peter Edwards	Australia	7:53.54	7:37.64	7:30.06; Final B
10	Otto Plettner	Mexico	8:03.86	7:46.84	7:33.24; Final B
11	Kasagi Satoomi	Japan	8:16.96	8:13.44	7:37.90; Final B
12	Vaclav Kozak	Czechoslovakia	7:45.75	7:42.56	DNS; Final B
13	Eugeniusz Kubiak	Poland	8:08.96	7:44.75	DNS; Final B

== Sources ==
- Tokyo Organizing Committee (1964). The Games of the XVIII Olympiad: Tokyo 1964, vol. 2.
