= Gotfredsen =

Gotfredsen is a surname. Notable people with the surname include:

- Leif Gotfredsen (1934–2006), Canadian rower
- Nanna Gotfredsen (born 1969), Danish politician
- Nicholas Gotfredsen (born 1989), Danish footballer
