= Seán Drea =

Irish rower (born 1947)

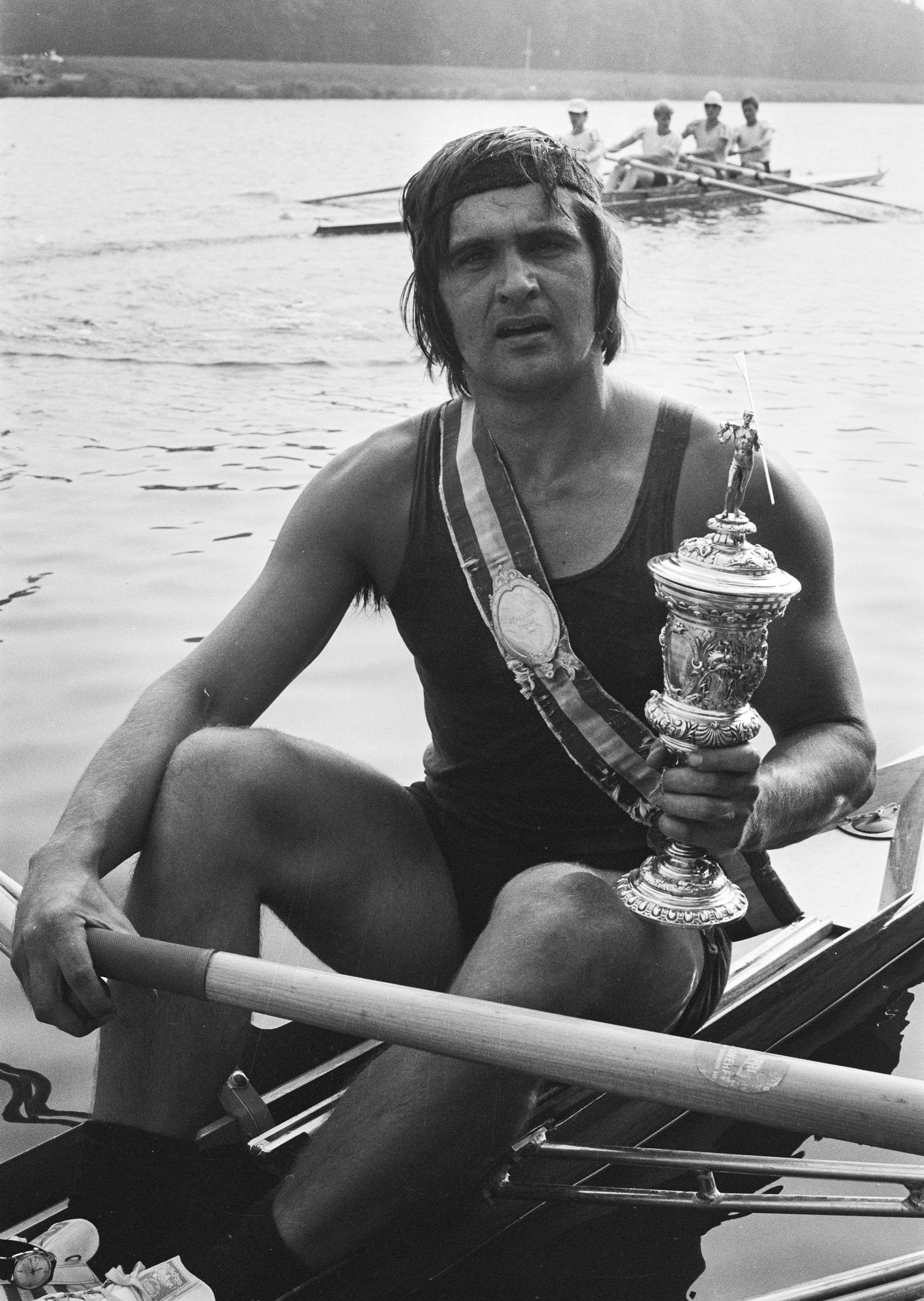
- Drea with his 1976 Holland Beker trophy at Bosbaan

Personal information
- Born: 2 March 1947 (age 79) Bagnalstown, Ireland
- Height: 1.90 m (6 ft 3 in)
- Weight: 98 kg (216 lb)

Sport
- Sport: Rowing
- Club: Neptune Rowing Club, Dublin
Medal record
Men's rowing
Representing Ireland
World Rowing Championships
Silver medal – second place	1975 Nottingham	Single sculls

Seán Joseph Drea (born 3 March 1947) is a former Olympic rower and world record holder from Ireland, specialising in the single scull. He won the Diamond Challenge Sculls (the premier singles sculls event) three years in a row at the Henley Royal Regatta, where he set the course record, and was the first Irish rower to win a World Championship medal securing silver in the 1975 World Championships.

== Biography ==
Drea lives in Greystones, and is originally from Bagenalstown, County Carlow. He tried many sports before joining Neptune Rowing Club after moving to Dublin to work in advertising. He later moved to Philadelphia, where he attended St. Joseph's University on a sports scholarship and also rowed for Vesper Boat Club. He lost to Aleksandr Timoshinin in the final of the 1972 Diamond Sculls when the steering fin broke off his boat. At the 1972 Olympics, he came seventh. In 1974, he won the U.S. national championships, and was the favorite for the World Championships in Rotsee; however he withdrew for an emergency kidney stone removal. At the 1975 World Championships, he finished second to Peter-Michael Kolbe. At the 1976 Olympics, he broke the 2000 m world record in the semi-final with a time of 6:52.46. However, he finished fourth in the final after a poor third quarter.

Drea spent years in Philadelphia as a coach for the US national team, Fairmount Rowing Association, La Salle University and subsequently the Irish National team. He also rowed in the Head of the River Race in 1997 with a veteran Schuylkill Navy crew. Today, Drea lives in Greystones, County Wicklow, Ireland and runs an organic farming business.

Sean's son Jack Drea rowed for Oxford Brookes University and won the Temple Challenge Cup at Henley Royal Regatta in 2006 and competed in the Ladies Challenge Plate in an Oxford Brookes & Oxford University composite in 2007. Jack also represented Ireland in rowing.

Sean’s eldest son David Drea rowed for Trinity College Dublin.

== Record ==
Year	Event	Place	Ref
1970	Henley	QF	
1970	Worlds	12	
1972	Henley	2	
1972	Olympics	7	
1973	Henley	1	
1974	Henley	1	
1975	Henley	1	
1975	Worlds	2	
1976	Olympics	4	
