= Kasagi =

Kasagi may refer to:

- Japanese aircraft carrier Kasagi: see Unryū class aircraft carrier
- Japanese cruiser Kasagi
- Kasagi Dam
- Kasagi Station
- Kasagi class cruiser
- Kasagi, Kyoto
- Siege of Kasagi
- A part of a torii

== People with the surname ==
- Nozomu Kasagi (born 1974), film director
- Satoomi Kasagi (笠木 聰臣; born 1946), Japanese rower
- Shizuko Kasagi (1914–1985), singer and actress
