= Chile at the 1972 Summer Olympics =

- IOC code: CHI
- NOC: Chilean Olympic Committee

in Munich
- Competitors: 11 (9 men, 2 women) in 5 sports
- Flag bearer: René Varas
- Medals: Gold 0 Silver 0 Bronze 0 Total 0

Summer Olympics appearances (overview)
- ~~1896~~; 1900–1908; 1912; 1920; 1924; 1928; 1932; 1936; 1948; 1952; 1956; 1960; 1964; 1968; 1972; 1976; 1980; 1984; 1988; 1992; 1996; 2000; 2004; 2008; 2012; 2016; 2020; 2024; 2028

Chile competed at the 1972 Summer Olympics in Munich, West Germany. Eleven competitors, nine men and two women, took part in nine events in five sports.

== Athletics ==
Men's 5000 meters

- Edmundo Warnke
  - Heat – 13:43.6 (→ did not advance)

== Boxing ==
Men's Flyweight (– 51 kg)

- Martín Vargas
  - First Round – Bye
  - Second Round – Lost to Calixto Perez (COL), 0:5

== Rowing ==
Men's Single Sculls

- Rodmanis Janis
  - Heat – 8:23.38
  - Repechage – 8:29.66 (→ did not advance)

== Shooting ==
Two male shooters represented Chile in 1972.

Skeet

- Jorge Uauy
- Antonio Yaqigi
