= Pavelescu =

Pavelescu is a Romanian surname. Notable people with the surname include:

- Aurelian Pavelescu (born 1964), Romanian politician
- Cincinat Pavelescu (1872–1934), Romanian poet and playwright
- Octavian Pavelescu (born 1942), Romanian rower
