= Jean-Marc Porte =

French rower

Personal information
- Nationality: French
- Born: 5 July 1947 (age 77); Rouen, France

Sport
- Sport: Rowing

Jean-Marc Porte (born 5 July 1947) is a French rower. He competed in the men's double sculls event at the 1968 Summer Olympics.
