= Anatoliy Sass =

Russian rower (1935–2023)

Personal information
- Born: Anatoly Fomich Sass; 22 December 1935 Moscow, Russian SFSR, USSR
- Died: 31 August 2023 (aged 87)

Sport
- Sport: Rowing
Medal record
Men's rowing
Representing the Soviet Union
Olympic Games
Gold medal – first place	1968 Mexico City	Double sculls
European Rowing Championships
Silver medal – second place	1965 Duisburg	Single sculls

Anatoly Fomich Sass (Russian: Анатолий Фомич Сасс; 22 December 1935 – 31 August 2023) was a Russian rower who competed for the Soviet Union in the 1964 Summer Olympics and in the 1968 Summer Olympics.

== Biography ==
Anatoly Fomich Sass was born in Moscow on 22 December 1935.

At the 1964 Olympics, he was a crew member of the Soviet boat which finished seventh in the coxless four event. Sass stood in for the single sculls champion who was suffering from illness, Vyacheslav Ivanov, at the 1965 European Rowing Championships, where he won the silver medal. At the 1968 Olympics, he and his partner Aleksandr Timoshinin won the gold medal in the double sculls event.

Sass died on 31 August 2023, at the age of 87.
