= Neptune Rowing Club =

Rowing club on the River Liffey in Dublin, Ireland

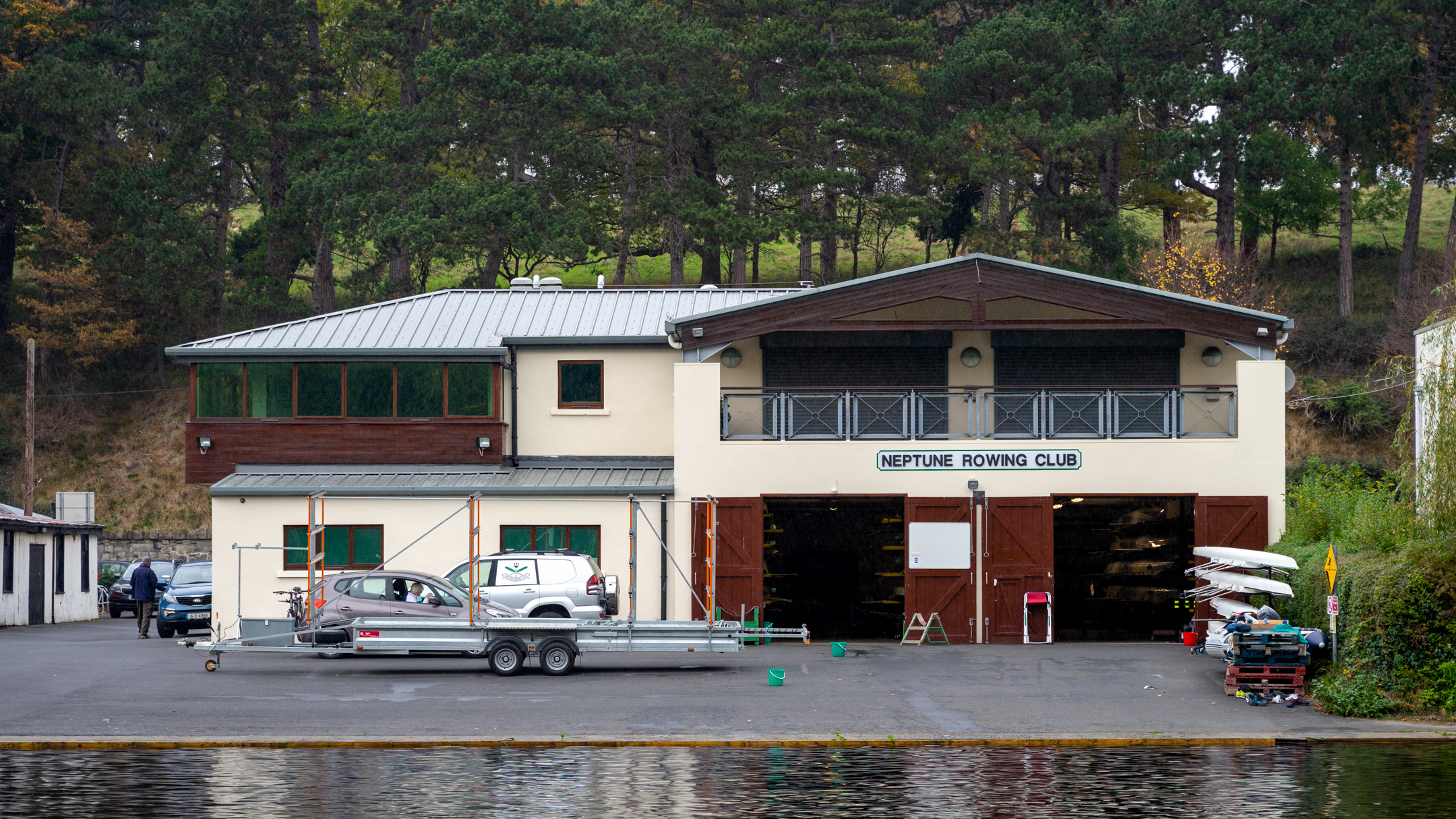
- Location: Islandbridge, Dublin
- Home water: River Liffey
- Founded: 1908
- Key people: Dara Breaden (President)
- Members known as: Neppers
- Affiliations: Rowing Ireland
- Website: www.neptunerowingclub.com

Events
- Neptune Head of The River, Neptune Regatta, Dublin Metropolitan Regatta

Notable members
- Derek Holland Seán Drea, Pat McDonagh, Neville Maxwell, Tony O'Connor, Gearoid Towey, Colm Butler, Martin Stevens, Frank Moore, Micheál Bailey, Barry Currivan, Brendan Dolan

Neptune Rowing Club, founded in 1908, is located on the River Liffey at Islandbridge, Dublin. It is one of the largest clubs in Ireland.

The club is a member of the Dublin Metropolitan group of clubs which operates a boat house on the reservoir in Blessington - therefore the club's rowers train at both Islandbridge and Blessington. The Dublin Metropolitan Regatta is also hosted here each year.

Neptune has a strong history in competitive rowing - it has accumulated 152 National Championship titles since 1914, and has won a number of Henley Regatta events including the Diamond Sculls, Britannia 4, Ladies Plate 8, Thames Cup 8 and Prince of Wales 4x (composite with Commercial RC).

== Victories at Henley Royal Regatta ==
In the 1996 Thames Cup final, Neptune beat Wallingford A.

More recently Neptune had further success at Henley in the Henley Women's Regatta of 2010 with a convincing win for the Elite Pair, beating Oxford University by two lengths in the final.

=== Honours ===
Year	Races won
1982	Britannia Challenge Cup
1986	Ladies' Challenge Plate
1996	Thames Challenge Cup

== Current Membership ==
The club currently has a very large and active group of members competing at all levels and across age groups, from novices to internationals competing for Ireland.

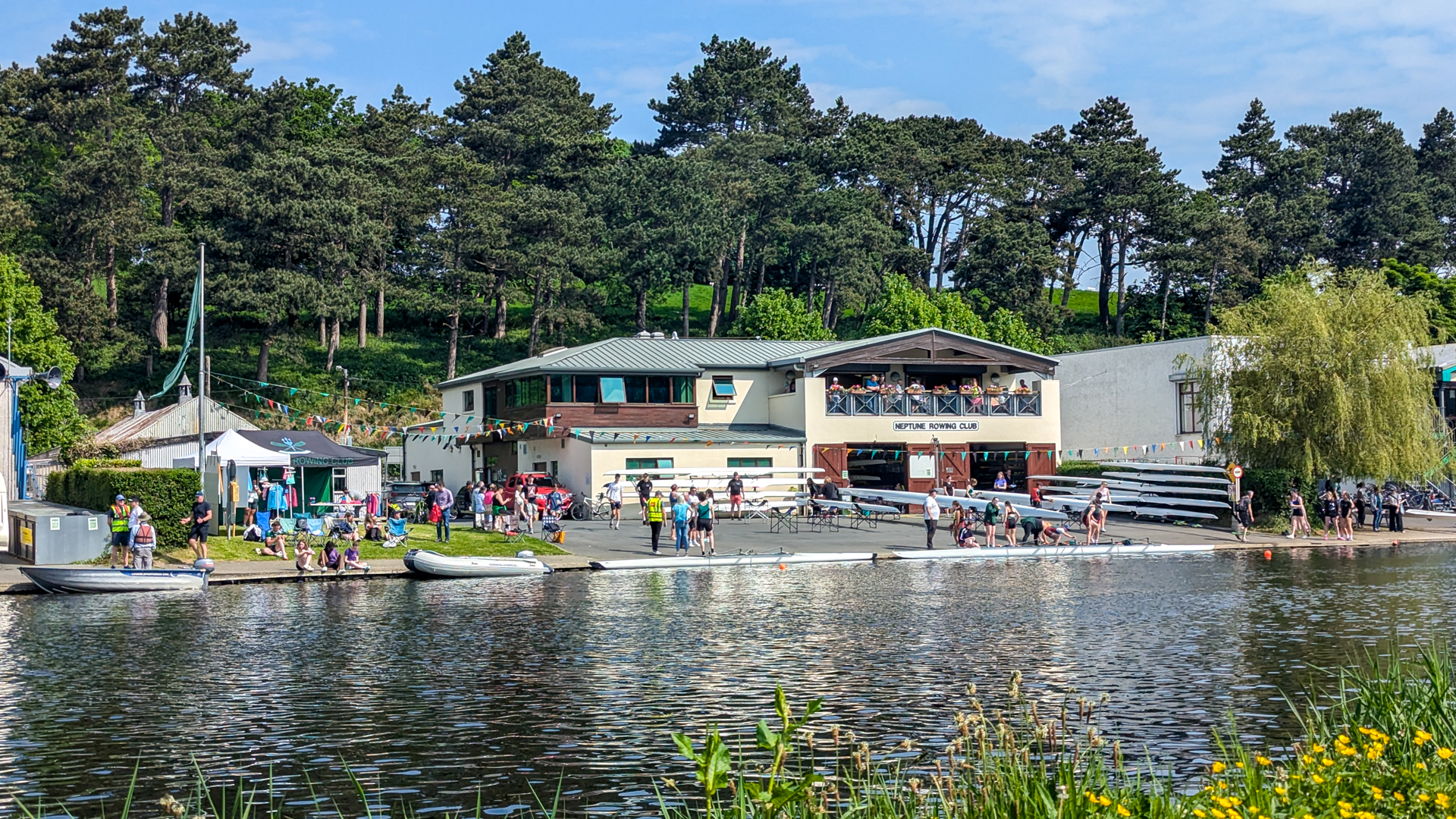
The clubhouse pictured during their 2024 Neptune Regatta

A 'Learn To Row' programme is taught at Neptune Rowing Club and participants can graduate from the programme into our competitive Novice Squad. The club also boasts a considerable number of Masters athletes (age 28-70) who compete in Ireland and individuals also represent Ireland at the World Masters Championships.

== Championship victories ==
All these are Neptune Irish Championships Titles (152 titles since 1914)

- 2016 Men's Novice Quad, Women's Novice Quad
- 2010 Women's Senior Pair
- 2007 Women's Senior Double Scull, Women's Senior 8+ ( composite with Waterford & Muckross )
- 2006 Men's Junior Scull, Men's Junior Double Scull, Women's Intermediate 8+, Women's Junior Scull and Women's Junior Double Scull
- 2005 Men's Intermediate 4+, Men's Junior 18 Double Scull, Women's Novice Scull
- 2004 Seniors: Women's Four
  - Intermediates: Women's Eight, Women's Four
  - Juniors: Men's Scull
- 2003 Juniors: Men's Quad, Men Pair, Men's Double Scull
  - Novices: Women's Eight
- 2002 Juniors: Men's Eight, Men's Four, Men's Pair. Seniors: Men's Quad (composite)
- 2001 Seniors: Men's Eight, Women Eight, Women's Four, Men's Quad, Men's Single, Men's Coxless Four, Men's Pair, Men's Double Scull, Men's Lightweight Scull
  - Intermediates: Men's Eight
  - Juniors: Men's Eight
- 2000 Seniors: Women's Four, Men's Double Scull
  - Intermediates: Women's Eight, Women's Single
  - Juniors: Men's Eight
- 1999 Seniors: Men's Eight, Men Four, Men Quad, Men Single, Men's coxless Four, Men's Pair
  - Intermediates: Women's Eight, Women's Four, Men's Single
- 1998 Seniors: Men's Eight, Men's Four, Men's Single, Men's Coxless Four, Men Pair, Men's Double Scull
  - Novices: Men's Four
  - Juniors: Men's Double Scull
- 1997 Seniors: Men's Eight, Men's Four, Men's Quad, Men's Single, Men's Coxless Four, Men's Pair, Men's Double Scull
  - Intermediates: Men's Pair, Men's Single
  - Novices: Men's Eight, Men's Four
- 1996 Seniors: Men's Eight
  - Novices: Women's Single
  - Juniors: Men's Quad, Women's Pair, Women's Double Scull
- 1995 Seniors: Men's Eight, Men Coxless Four, Men's Pair, Men's Double Scull
- 1994 Seniors: Men's Coxless Four, Men's Pair
  - Intermediates: Men's Eight
- 1993 Seniors: Men's Four, Men's Coxless Four
  - Novices: Women's Four
  - Juniors: Men's Single, Men's Double Scull
- 1992 Seniors: Men Eight, Men's Four, Men coxless Four, Men's Lightweight Scull
  - Juniors: Men's Double Scull
- 1991 Seniors: Men's Four, Men's Lightweight Scull
  - Juniors: Men's Eight
- 1990 Seniors: Men's Eight
  - Juniors: Men's Eight
- 1989 Seniors: Men's Eight, Men's Pair
  - Juniors: Men's Double Scull
- 1988 Seniors: Men's Four, Men's Pair
  - Intermediates: Men's Single
- 1987 Seniors: Men's Eight, Men's Four, Men Pair
- 1986 Seniors: Men's Eight, Men's Four, Men Pair
  - Juniors: Men Pair, Men Double Scull
- 1985 Seniors: Men's Eight, Men's Four, Men's Pair
  - Intermediates: Men's Four
- 1984 Seniors: Men's Eight
- 1983 Intermediates: Men's Four
- 1982 Seniors: Men's Pair
  - Novices: Men's Eight, Men's Four
  - Juniors: Men's Single, Men's Four, Men's Pair, Men's Double Scull
- 1981 Seniors: Men's Four
  - Intermediates: Men's Eight
  - Juniors: Men's Eight, Men Four, Men's Double Scull
- 1980 Seniors: Men's Eight
  - Juniors: Men's Double Scull: Jerome Hurley and John Moloco
- 1979 Seniors: Men's Double Scull
  - Juniors: Men's Four, Men's Pair
- 1977 Intermediates: Men's Eight, Men's Four
  - Novices: Men's Eight
- 1976 Juniors: Men's Four
- 1975 Intermediates: Men's Four
- 1974 Novices: Men's Eight
- 1972 Novices: Men's Eight
- 1971 Intermediates: Men's Eight, Men's Four
- 1970 Seniors: Men's Eight
- 1975 Juniors: Men's Single
- 1963 Intermediates: Men's Four
- 1947 Novices: Men's Eight
- 1944 Intermediates: Men's Eight
- 1934 Seniors: Men's Eight
  - Intermediates: Men's Eight
- 1914 Seniors: Men's Eight
