= Gilbert Vallanchon =

French rower

Personal information
- Nationality: French
- Born: 2 October 1941; Rouen, France
- Died: 24 March 2017 (aged 75)

Sport
- Sport: Rowing

Gilbert Vallanchon (2 October 1941 – 24 March 2017) was a French rower. He competed in the men's double sculls event at the 1968 Summer Olympics.
