= Bill Maher (rower) =

American rower

Personal information
- Full name: William Patrick Maher
- Born: June 25, 1946 (age 80) Detroit, Michigan, U.S.
Medal record
Men's rowing
Representing United States
Olympic Games
Bronze medal – third place	1968 Mexico City	Double sculls

William Patrick Maher (born June 25, 1946) is an American rower who competed in the 1968 Summer Olympics, winning a bronze medal in the men's double sculls. In 1969, he crewed for the United States Army out of Vesper Boat Club.

He was born in Detroit, Michigan. He started rowing at the Detroit Boat Club at age 15 in 1961 under assistant coach John W. Hutton, Jr. The following year in 1962, he was promoted to the first DBC eight under head coach Kenneth L. Blue. That year he competed with the DBC eight that made it to the quarter finals in the Thames Challenge Cup at the Henley Royal Regatta in England.

In 1963 he was a member of the fastest eight fielded from the Detroit Boat Club, with 1956 Olympic silver medalist John R. Welchli at bow, Dave Mix, Frank Housen, Roy Karabacz, John Simkus, Charles Kemp, Bill crewed at 7 seat, and Jim Bowen at stroke, and Derek Hughes as the coxswain. They won both the United States and Canadian championship eights, setting the record for the 1 mile and 5/16ths course in St. Catherines, Ontario at 5:55.4. He was also in the DBC Intermediate Eight that won the U.S. National title that year with Tom Vigliotti, Dan Kocis, Frank Howson, Dave Mix, Lu Curl, Jay Ambrosini, Don Law, and Derek Hughes.

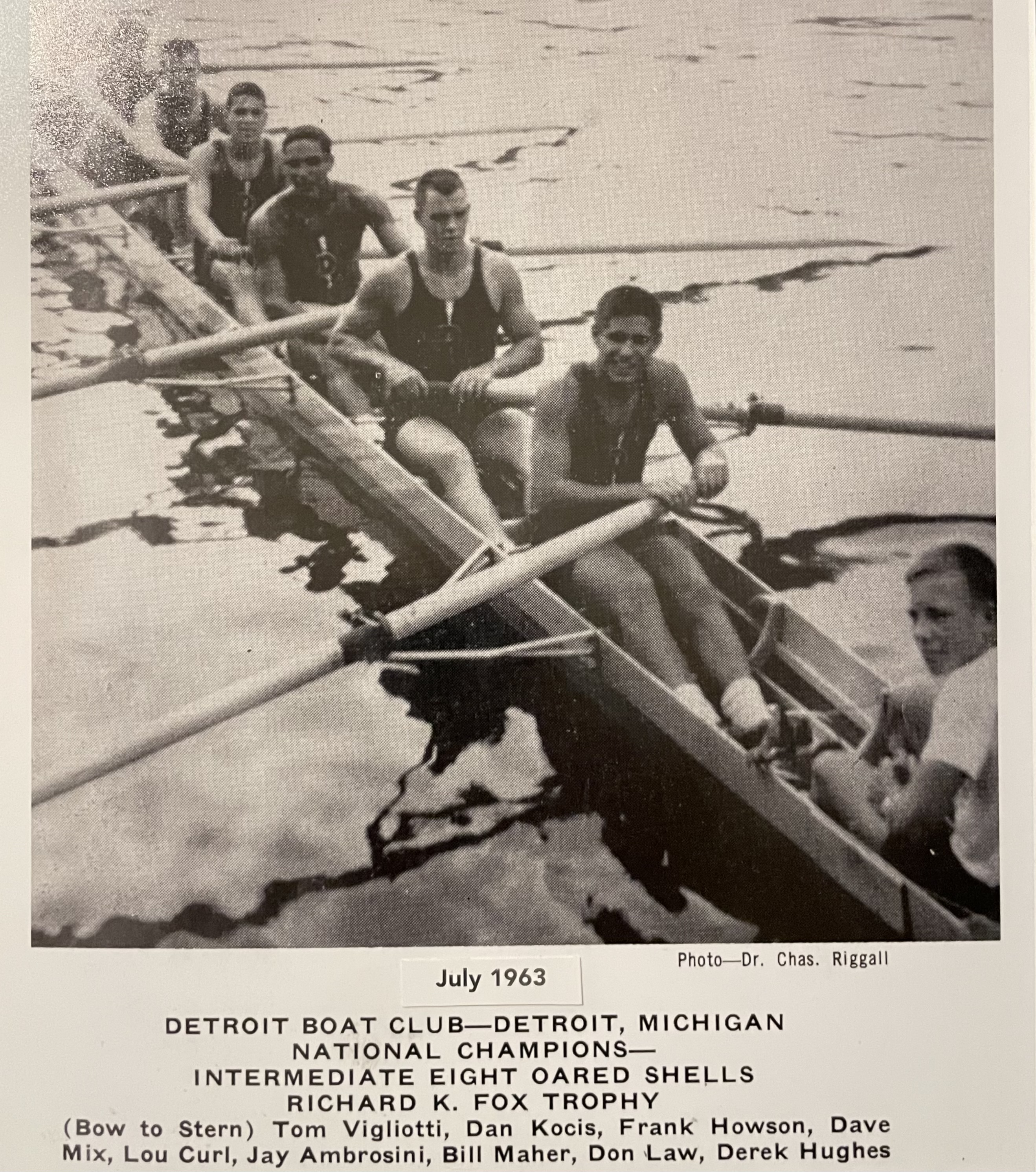
Detroit Boat Club 1963 National Champions

In 1964 the crew made a bid for the Tokyo Olympics, yet despite with a changed lineup they placed 5th in the trials.

In 1965, he switched to sculling, winning both the Junior and Championship Singles at the Royal Canadian Henley Regatta. Several weeks later he won the Association Singles at the U.S. National Rowing Championships in New York, earning him a spot in the Championship event. There, he was down by two lengths at the 1,000 meter mark before he pressed on to a photo finish, beating Donald Spero, the best American single sculler, by a margin of inches. This earned him an entry at the European Rowing Championships in Duisburg, Germany where he placed 11th in the Men's Singles.

In 1966 he won the men's 1/4 mile dash for singles at the U.S. Nationals. In the Championship Singles event he had placed second to Don Spero but was disqualified for cutting into the wrong lane on the Schuylkill course in Philadelphia. He was still sent to the World Rowing Championships in Bled, Yugoslavia as a spare for Don Spero, but was entered in the fours with coxswain event with a crew that was put together at the last moment and they placed 6th.

In 1967 he regained the Championship Singles title again at the National Rowing Championships, setting a course record with a time of 6:50 over the Philadelphia Schuylkill course.

In 1968 he attempted to represent the United States in the singles event at the Olympics, however he placed 3rd in the trials after suffering from a chest cold that he had developed flying in a unheated military cargo plane that the army provided to take him and his boat to the trials. He soon teamed up with John Nunn of Long Beach and together they trained for the doubles event, which they won by open water at the trials in Long Beach. At the Olympics they won the bronze medal in the double sculls event.

In 1969, now rowing for the US Army out of Vesper Boat Club, he was sent by Jack Kelly, Jr. to race in the Diamond Sculls at the Henley Royal Regatta in England where he made it to the semifinals. Not long after, he won the Championship Singles yet again, and then represented the US at the European Championships at Klagenfurt, Austria. Also at the US Nationals in 1969, he stroked the winning Vesper Quad, teaming with Paul Wilson, Bob Arlett, and Bob Montgomery.

After 1969 he took some time off before trying again to qualify for the Olympics in 1972 in both the singles and the doubles but was unable to earn a spot on the team.

Following 1972, he took 25 years off from rowing to raise his family before coming back as a masters rower at the DBC, where he still competes today.
