= Robert Stubbs =

Canadian rower

Personal information
- Nationality: Canadian
- Born: 4 April 1939 (age 85); Ormskirk, England

Sport
- Sport: Rowing

Robert Stubbs (born 4 April 1939) is a Canadian rower. He competed in the men's double sculls event at the 1968 Summer Olympics.
