= Kim Børgesen =

Danish rower

Personal information
- Nationality: Danish
- Born: 13 December 1945 (age 79)

Sport
- Sport: Rowing

Kim Børgesen (born 13 December 1945) is a Danish rower. He competed in the men's single sculls event at the 1972 Summer Olympics.
