= Eugeniusz Kubiak =

Polish rower (1939–2024)

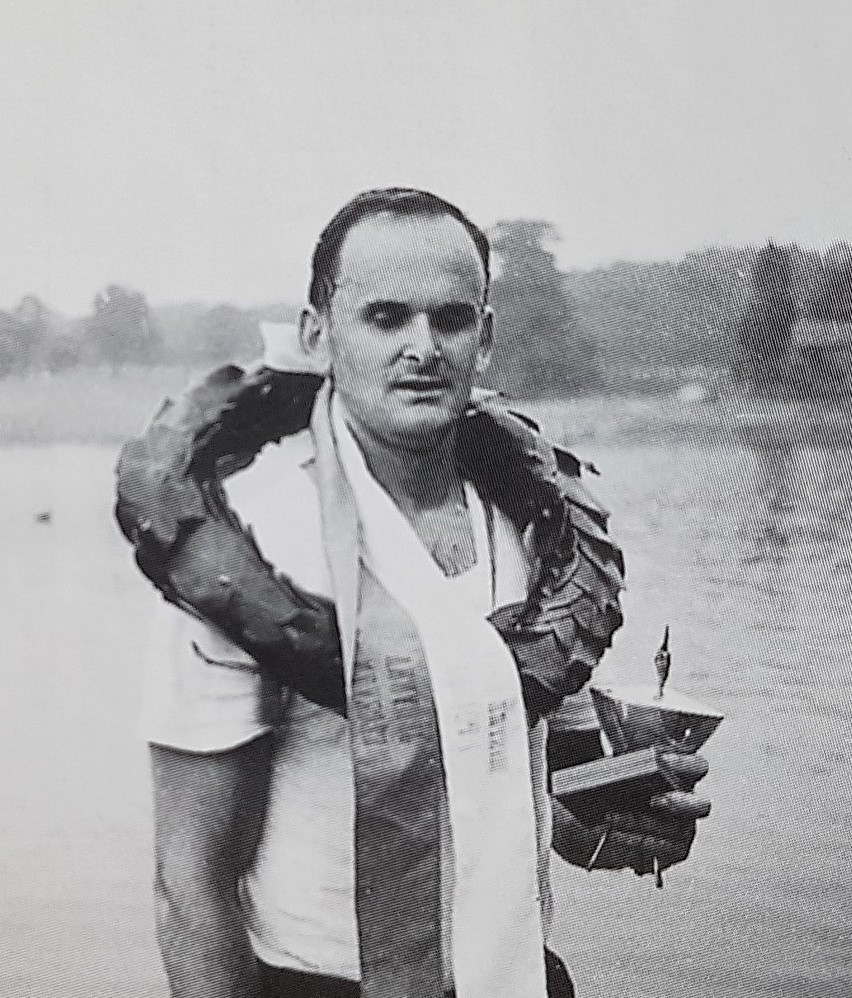
- Kubiak in 1967

Personal information
- Nationality: Polish
- Born: 25 May 1939; Poznań, Poland
- Died: 17 November 2024 (aged 85)

Sport
- Sport: Rowing

Eugeniusz Kubiak (25 May 1939 – 17 November 2024) was a Polish rower. He competed in the men's single sculls event at the 1964 Summer Olympics.

Kubiak died on 17 November 2024, at the age of 85.
