= John Nunn (rower) =

American rower (born 1942)

Personal information
- Full name: John Hamann Nunn
- Born: October 12, 1942 (age 83) Terre Haute, Indiana, U.S.

Sport
- University team: Cornell
Medal record
Men's rowing
Representing United States
Olympic Games
Bronze medal – third place	1968 Mexico City	Double sculls
Pan American Games
Silver medal – second place	1967 Winnipeg	Single sculls
Bronze medal – third place	1971 Cali	Double sculls

John Hamann Nunn (born October 12, 1942) is an American rower who competed in two Olympics. He won a bronze medal in the 1968 Summer Olympics with his partner Bill Maher in the double sculls event. He went on to coach the 1976 Olympic U.S. rowing team in Montreal placing 5th.

A graduate of Cornell University, Nunn was inducted into the Cornell Big Red hall of fame in 2008.

He was born in Terre Haute, Indiana. He lives in California and is married and has five children.

== Sources ==
- Evans, Hilary; Gjerde, Arild; Heijmans, Jeroen; Mallon, Bill; et al. "John Nunn". Olympics at Sports-Reference.com. Sports Reference LLC. Archived from the original on October 16, 2012.
