= Manfred Haake =

German rower (born 1943)

Personal information
- Born: 9 November 1943 (age 82) Jänschwalde, Germany
- Height: 186 cm (6 ft 1 in)
- Weight: 86 kg (190 lb)

Sport
- Sport: Rowing
Medal record
Men's rowing
Representing East Germany
World Rowing Championships
Bronze medal – third place	1966 Bled	Double scull
European Rowing Championships
Silver medal – second place	1969 Klagenfurt	Double scull

Manfred Haake (born 9 November 1943) is a German rower who represented East Germany. He competed at the 1968 Summer Olympics in Mexico City in the men's double sculls with Uli Schmied where they came fifth.
