= Edgard Gijsen =

Brazilian rower

Personal information
- Nationality: Brazilian
- Born: 29 January 1940; Antwerp, Belgium
- Died: 31 July 2008 (aged 68); Rio de Janeiro, Brazil

Sport
- Sport: Rowing

Edgard Gijsen (29 January 1940 – 31 July 2008) was a Brazilian rower. He competed in the men's double sculls event at the 1968 Summer Olympics.
