= Yury Malyshev (rower) =

Medal record

Representing the Soviet Union

Men's rowing

Olympic Games
Gold medal – first place	1972 Munich	Single sculls

Yury Aleksandrovich Malyshev (Russian: Юрий Александрович Малышев, born 1 February 1947) is a former Soviet competition rower and Olympic champion.

Malyshev was born in Khimki in 1947. He received a gold medal in single sculls at the 1972 Summer Olympics in Munich.
