= Atanas Zhelev =

Bulgarian rower

Personal information
- Nationality: Bulgarian
- Born: 31 January 1938 (age 87); Sozopol, Bulgaria

Sport
- Sport: Rowing

Atanas Zhelev (Bulgarian: Атанас Желев; born 31 January 1938) is a Bulgarian rower. He competed in the men's double sculls event at the 1968 Summer Olympics.
