= Harry Droog =

Dutch rower (born 1944)

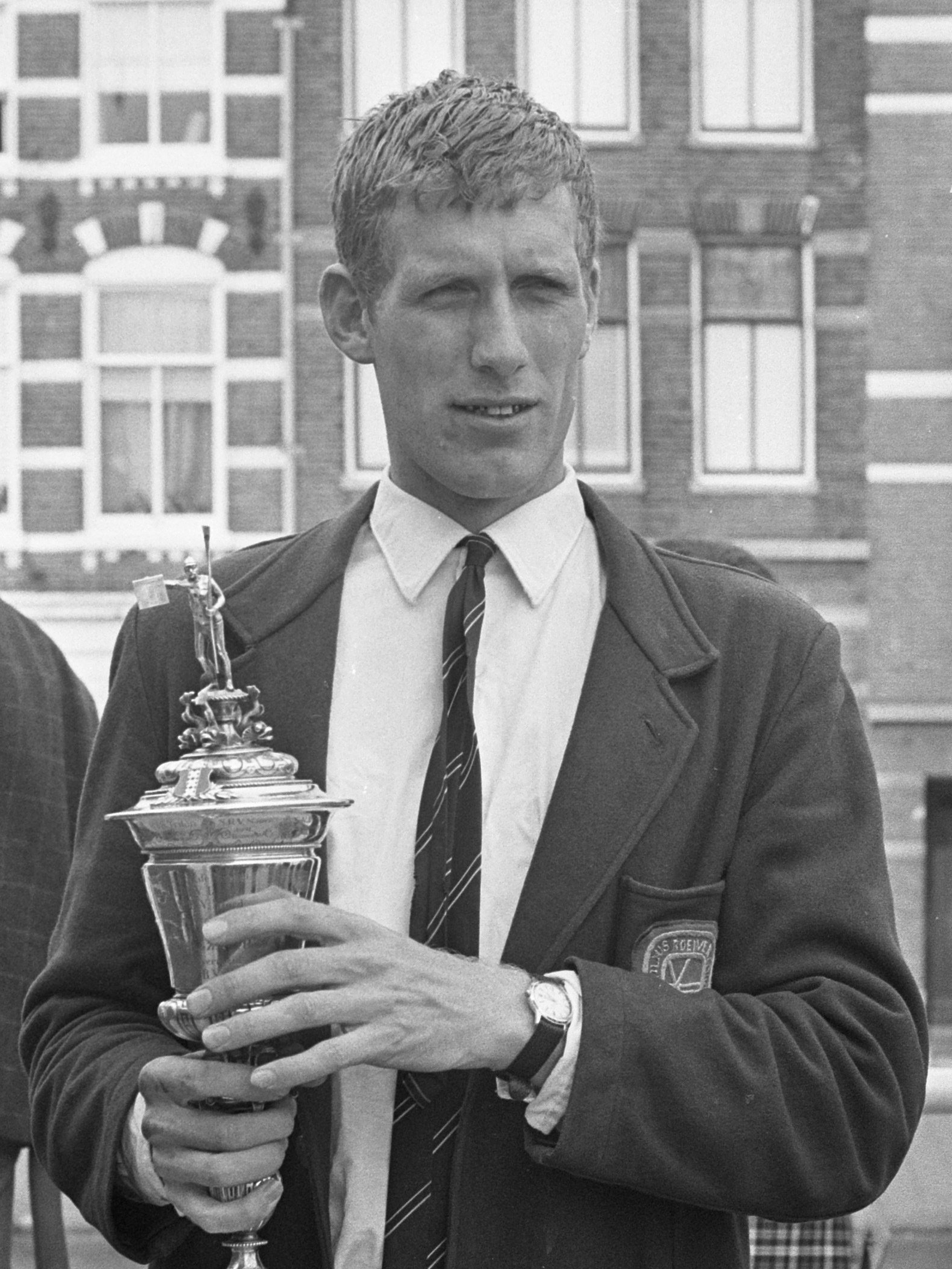
- Harry Droog in 1968

Personal information
- Born: 17 December 1944 (age 81) Beemster, the Netherlands
- Height: 1.91 m (6 ft 3 in)
- Weight: 77 kg (170 lb)

Sport
- Sport: Rowing
- Club: Proteus-Eretes, Delft
Medal record
Representing the Netherlands
Olympic Games
Silver medal – second place	1968 Mexico City	Double sculls

Henricus Antonius "Harry" Droog (born 17 December 1944) is a retired Dutch rower. He competed at the 1968 Summer Olympics and won a silver medal in the double sculls event, together with Leendert van Dis. In 1975 he won the Silver Goblets and Nickalls' Challenge Cup at the Henley Royal Regatta with Roel Luijnenburg.

In 2025, he set a world record for indoor rowing marathon (42,195 meters) for 80-84 year old men. His time was 2:59:37.7. He also set records for most meters in one hour and fastest half-marathon (21,097 meters ) in the 80-84 year old age bracket.
