= Peter Edwards (rower) =

Australian rower

Personal information
- Full name: Peter Frederick Edwards
- Nationality: Australian
- Born: 8 September 1939 (age 86)

Sport
- Sport: Rowing
- Club: Melbourne Rowing Club

Achievements and titles
- Olympic finals: Men's 1X Rome 1964 B Final
- National finals: President's Cup 1960,64,65,68.

Peter Frederick Edwards (born 8 September 1939) is an Australian former representative rower. A national champion sculler, he competed in the men's single sculls event at the 1964 Summer Olympics.

== Club, state and Olympic rowing ==
Edwards' senior club rowing was from the Melbourne Rowing Club.

State representative honours for Edwards came in 1960 when he was selected as the Victorian entrant to race for the Presidents Cup in the men's single scull at the Interstate Regatta within the Australian Rowing Championships. He placed third that year. He made further President's Cup appaeranace for Victoria in 1964, 1965 and 1968 achieving podium finishes everytime and winning the Australian Interstate title in 1964.

Edwards' national victory in 1964 saw him selected as Australia's entrant in the single scull for the 1964 Tokyo Olympics. His poor row to fourth place in his heat meant that he met tough opposition in his repechage where he finished second, he was relegated to the B final where he placed 3rd for an overall ninth placing at the Olympic regatta.
