= Jaroslav Hellebrand =

Czech rower (born 1945)

Medal record

Men's rowing

Representing Czechoslovakia

Olympic Games
Bronze medal – third place	1976 Montreal	Quadruple sculls

World Rowing Championships
Silver medal – second place	1975 Nottingham	Quadruple sculls
Bronze medal – third place	1970 St. Catharines	Single sculls
Bronze medal – third place	1974 Lucerne	Quadruple sculls

European Rowing Championships
Bronze medal – third place	1965 Duisburg	Double sculls
Bronze medal – third place	1967 Vichy	Double sculls

Jaroslav Hellebrand (born 30 December 1945) is a Czech rower who competed for Czechoslovakia in the 1968 Summer Olympics, in the 1972 Summer Olympics, and in the 1976 Summer Olympics.

He was born in Prague.

In 1968 he and his partner Petr Krátký finished twelfth in the double sculls event.

Four years later he finished twelfth in the single sculls competition.

At the 1976 Games he was part of the Czechoslovak boat which won the bronze medal in the quadruple sculls contest.
