= Alexandru Aposteanu =

Romanian rower

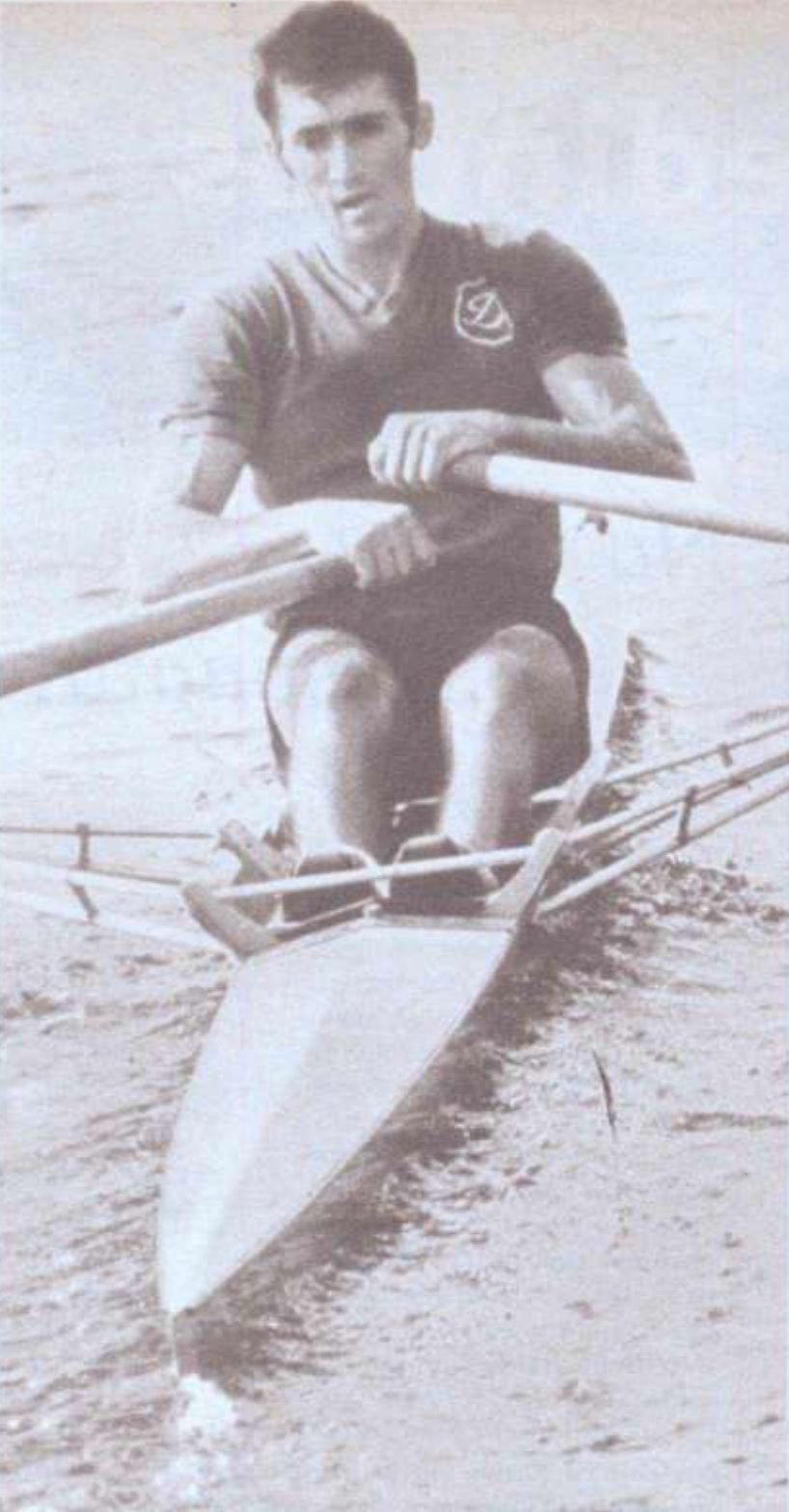
- Alexandru Aposteanu in 1967

Personal information
- Nationality: Romanian
- Born: 9 August 1942 (age 82); Târgu Jiu, Romania

Sport
- Sport: Rowing

Alexandru Aposteanu (born 9 August 1942) is a Romanian rower. He competed in the men's double sculls event at the 1968 Summer Olympics.
