= Leendert van Dis =

Dutch rower (born 1944)

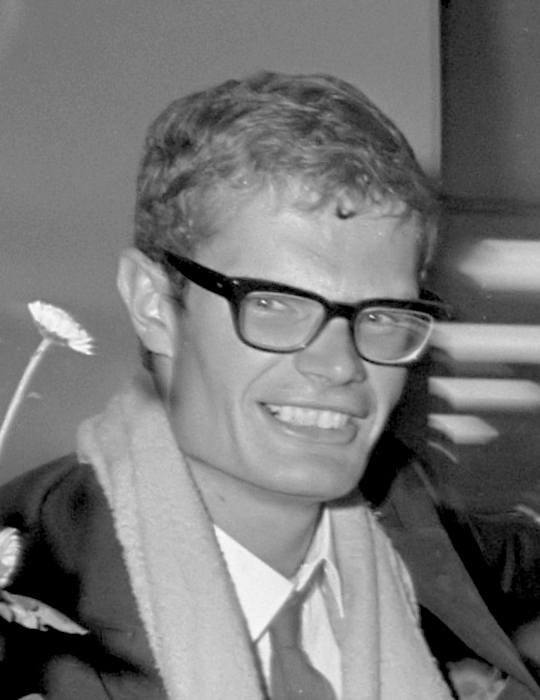
- Leendert van Dis in 1968

Personal information
- Born: 20 August 1944 (age 81) Amsterdam, the Netherlands
- Height: 1.94 m (6 ft 4 in)
- Weight: 85 kg (187 lb)

Sport
- Sport: Rowing
- Club: Willem III, Amsterdam
Medal record
Olympic Games
Silver medal – second place	1968 Mexico City	double sculls

Leendert Frans van Dis (born 20 August 1944) is a retired Dutch rower. Together with Harry Droog he won a silver medal in the double sculls event at the 1968 Summer Olympics.
