= Satoomi Kasagi =

Japanese rower (born 1946)

Personal information
- Nationality: Japanese
- Born: 9 January 1946 (age 79)

Sport
- Sport: Rowing

Satoomi Kasagi (笠木 聰臣, Kasagi Satoomi, born 9 January 1946) is a Japanese rower. He competed in the men's single sculls event at the 1964 Summer Olympics.
