= Ricardo Scheffler =

Mexican rower (born 1948)

Personal information
- Born: 29 June 1948 (age 76); Mexico City, Mexico

Sport
- Sport: Rowing

Ricardo Scheffler (born 29 June 1948) is a Mexican rower. He competed at the 1968 Summer Olympics and the 1972 Summer Olympics.
