= Wolfgang Glock =

German rower

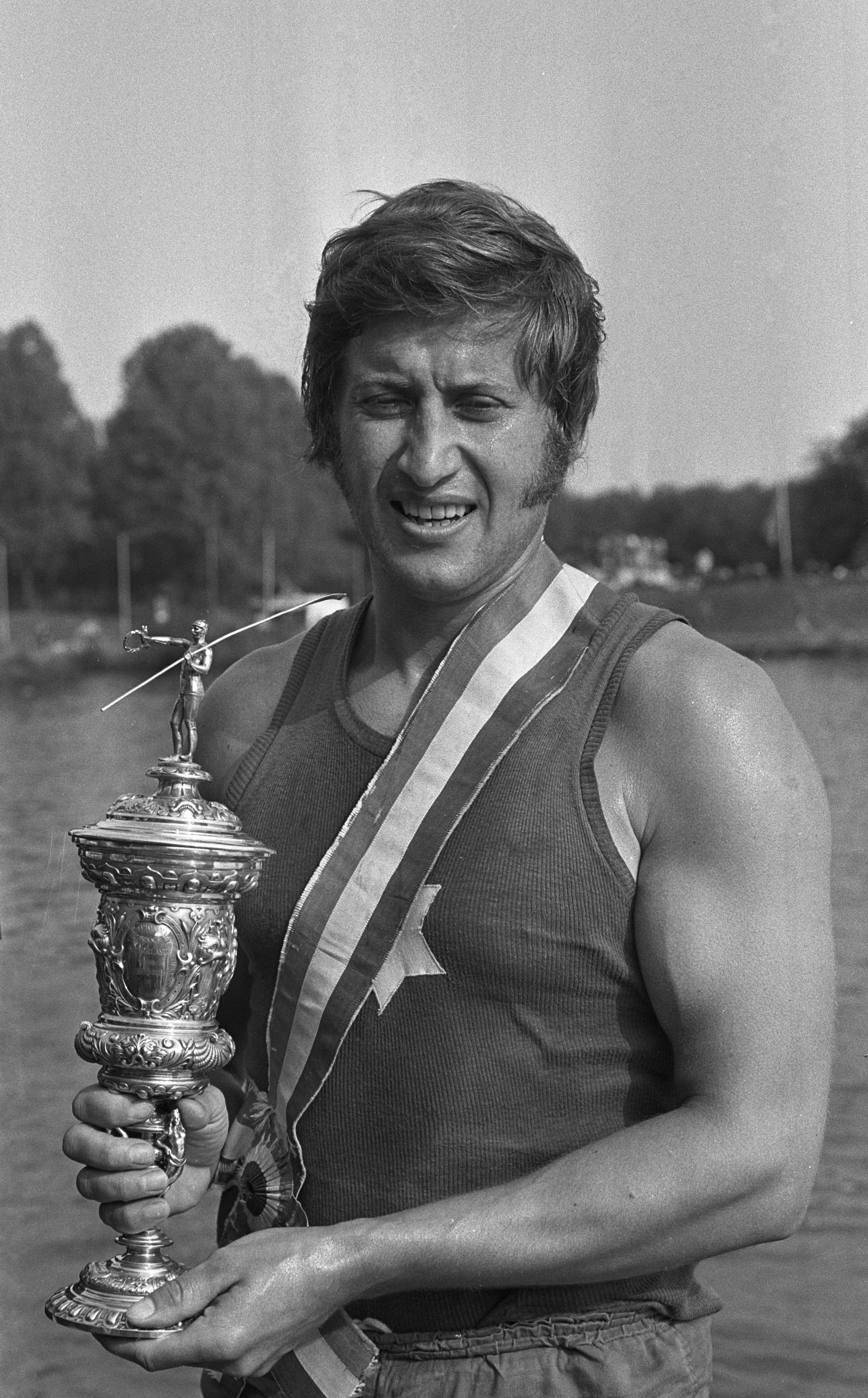
- Wolfgang Glock in 1972

Personal information
- Born: 16 January 1944 Frankfurt, Germany
- Died: April 2025 (aged 81)
- Height: 1.84 m (6 ft 0 in)
- Weight: 85 kg (187 lb)

Sport
- Sport: Rowing
- Club: Frankfurter RG Germania

Wolfgang Glock (16 January 1944 – April 2025) was a West German rower. He competed at the 1968 Summer Olympics in the double sculls event, together with Udo Hild, and finished in sixth place. He won four national titles, two in the single sculls (1969 and 1972) and two in the double sculls (1967 and 1968).
