= Octavian Pavelescu =

Romanian rower

Personal information
- Nationality: Romanian
- Born: 8 September 1942 (age 82); Periam, Romania

Sport
- Sport: Rowing

Octavian Pavelescu (born 8 September 1942) is a Romanian rower. He competed in the men's double sculls event at the 1968 Summer Olympics.
