= Lennart Bälter =

Swedish rower

Personal information
- Nationality: Swedish
- Born: 3 May 1946 (age 79); Mora, Sweden

Sport
- Sport: Rowing

Lennart Bälter (born 3 May 1946) is a Swedish rower. He competed at the 1972 Summer Olympics and the 1976 Summer Olympics.
