= Jorge Uauy =

Chilean sports shooter

Personal information
- Born: 8 December 1944 (age 81)

Sport
- Sport: Sports shooting

Jorge Uauy (born 8 December 1944) is a Chilean former sports shooter. He competed in the skeet event at the 1972 Summer Olympics. He won five consecutive national championships in the sport in the 1970s.
