= Achim Hill =

East German rower (1935–2015)

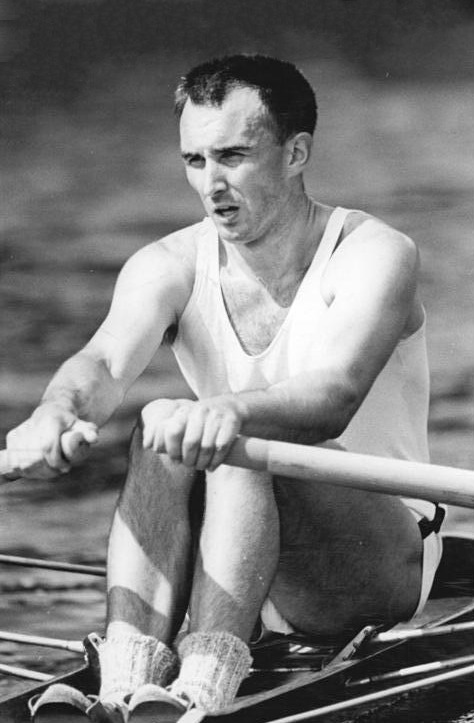
- Hill in 1962

Personal information
- Born: 1 April 1935 Köpenick, Germany
- Died: 4 August 2015 (aged 80)
Medal record
Men's rowing
Representing Germany
Olympic Games
Silver medal – second place	1960 Rome	Single sculls
Silver medal – second place	1964 Tokyo	Single sculls
Representing East Germany
European Championships
Gold medal – first place	1967 Vichy	Single sculls

Achim Hill (1 April 1935 – 4 August 2015) was a German rower who competed for the United Team of Germany in the 1960 Summer Olympics and in the 1964 Summer Olympics and for East Germany in the 1968 Summer Olympics.

== Biography ==
Hill born in Köpenick, won the silver medal in the single sculls event at the 1960 Olympic Games. Four years later he won his second silver medal in the 1964 single sculls competition. At the 1968 Games he represented East Germany and finished fifth in the single sculls contest.

He competed at the inaugural 1962 World Rowing Championships. The Fédération Internationale des Sociétés d'Aviron (FISA) did not recognise East Germany, and so only one German crew was permitted per event. Selection trials between East and West German crews were held the day before the championships, with West German crews winning in six of the seven categories. Hill was the only East German who qualified (in the single sculls), but he did not proceed beyond the heats. Hill was out of form in the following year and did not even make it to the selection trials for the 1963 European Rowing Championships. He won the selection trial for the 1964 European Rowing Championships and came seventh at the regatta.

In 1966, Hill won the Diamond Challenge Sculls (the premier singles sculls event) at the Henley Royal Regatta, rowing for BSGM Baumschuleneweg.

Hill married Gisela Jäger in 1973. Hill studied airplane construction in West Berlin before the wall was raised, he then moved to Dresden, where he graduated as an engineer at the Institute of Rail Vehicles.

He died on 4 August 2015.
