= Aleksandr Timoshinin =

Russian rower (1948–2021)

Personal information
- Born: 20 May 1948 Moscow, Russian SFSR, Soviet Union
- Died: 26 November 2021 (aged 73)
Medal record
Men's rowing
Representing the Soviet Union
Olympic Games
Gold medal – first place	1968 Mexico City	Double sculls
Gold medal – first place	1972 Munich	Double sculls
European Rowing Championships
Silver medal – second place	1973 Moscow	Double sculls

Aleksandr Ivanovich Timoshinin (Russian: Александр Иванович Тимошинин, 20 May 1948 – 26 November 2021) was a Russian rower.

== Biography ==
Born in Moscow, he later competed for the Soviet Union in the 1968 Summer Olympics and in the 1972 Summer Olympics.

At the 1968 Olympics, Timoshuinin and his partner Anatoliy Sass won the gold medal in the double sculls event. Four years later he won his second gold medal this time with his partner Gennadi Korshikov in the double sculls competition.

In 1972, Timoshinin won the Diamond Challenge Sculls (the premier singles sculls event) at the Henley Royal Regatta, rowing for WMF Moscow.

Timoshinin died on 26 November 2021, at the age of 73, from COVID-19 during the COVID-19 pandemic in Russia.
