= Rob Groen =

Dutch rower (1938–2018)

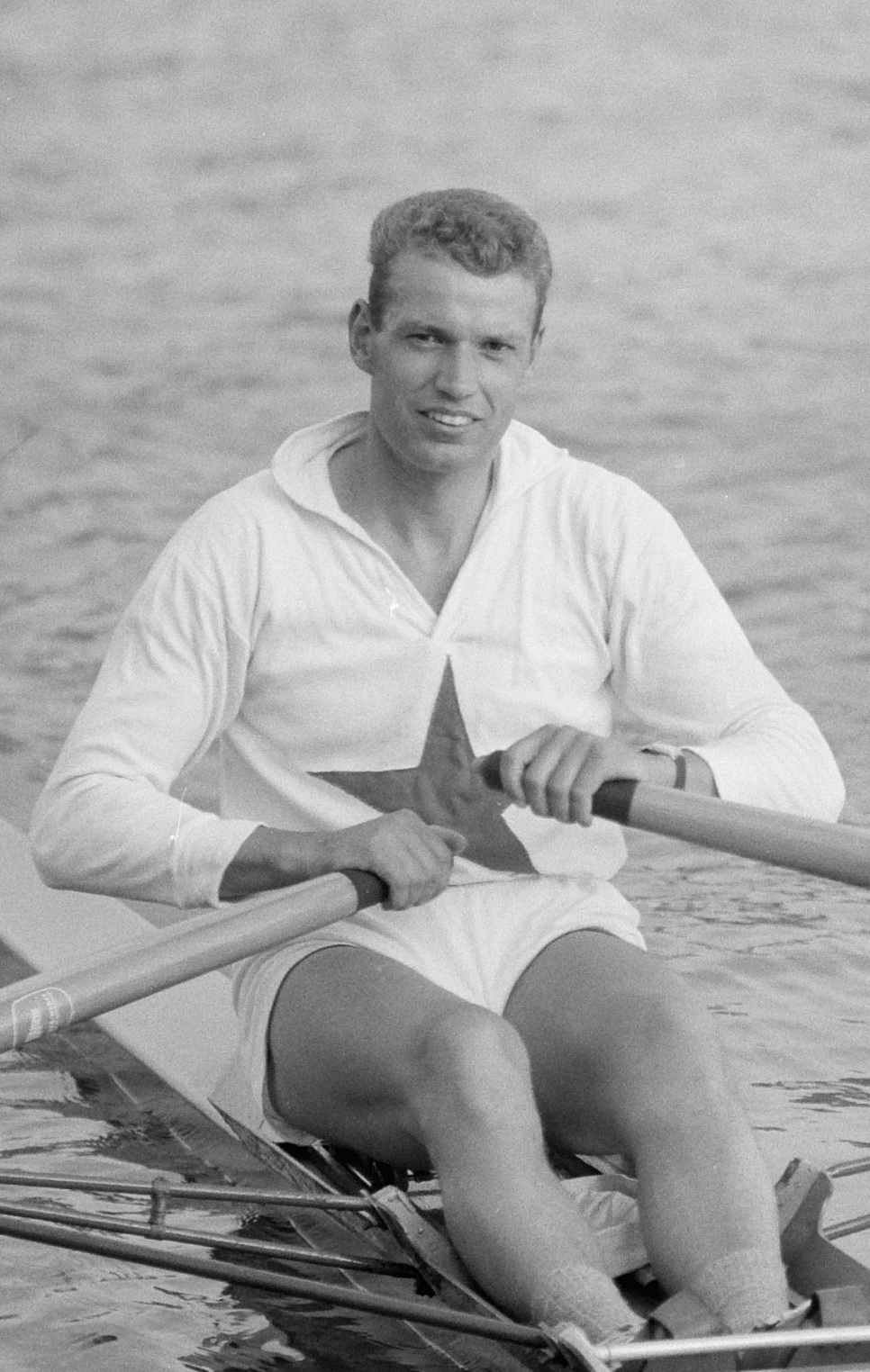
- Rob Groen in 1964

Personal information
- Born: 18 February 1938 Amsterdam, the Netherlands
- Died: November 2018 (aged 80)
- Height: 1.81 m (5 ft 11 in)
- Weight: 85 kg (187 lb)

Sport
- Sport: Rowing
- Club: Aegir, Groningen
Medal record
Representing the Netherlands
European Rowing Championships
Silver medal – second place	1963 Copenhagen	Single sculls
Silver medal – second place	1964 Amsterdam	Single sculls

Robert Jacques "Rob" Groen (18 February 1938 – November 2018) was a Dutch rower. He competed at the 1964 Summer Olympics in the single sculls and finished in seventh place. He won two silver medals in this event at the European championships in 1963 and 1964.
