= James Butterfield =

Bermudian rower (born 1950)

James "Jim" Butterfield (born 1 September 1950 in Hamilton, Bermuda) was a rower for Bermuda at the 1972 Olympics.

As of 2015, is the only person to ever represent Bermuda in rowing at the Olympics. He also represented Bermuda in the marathon at the 1978 Commonwealth Games, finishing 17th.

His son Tyler Butterfield was a two-time Olympic triathlete for Bermuda while James himself finished 7th at the 1981 Ironman World Championship.

He previously attended Northeastern University.
