= Janis Rodmanis =

Chilean rower

Personal information
- Nationality: Chilean
- Born: 25 December 1947 (age 77)

Sport
- Sport: Rowing

Janis Rodmanis (born 25 December 1947) is a Chilean rower. He competed in the men's single sculls event at the 1972 Summer Olympics.

Rodmanis was named the Chilean rower of the year in 1972, and he was a three-time national champion in both single and double sculls.
