= Leif Gotfredsen =

Canadian rower

Personal information
- Nationality: Canadian
- Born: 28 June 1934; Herning, Denmark
- Died: 30 June 2006 (aged 72); Victoria, British Columbia, Canada

Sport
- Sport: Rowing

Leif Gotfredsen (28 June 1934 – 30 June 2006) was a Canadian rower. He competed in the men's single sculls event at the 1964 Summer Olympics.
