= Udo Hild =

German rower (1943–2022)

Personal information
- Born: 18 March 1943 Mainz, Hesse, Germany
- Died: 15 June 2022 (aged 79) Taunusstein, Hesse, Germany
- Height: 1.85 m (6 ft 1 in)
- Weight: 81 kg (179 lb)

Sport
- Sport: Rowing
- Club: Mainzer Rudergesellschaft/Binger RG

Udo Hild (18 March 1943 – 15 June 2022) was a West German rower who competed at the 1968 and 1972 Summer Olympics. In 1968 he finished in sixth place in the double sculls event, together with Wolfgang Glock, and in 1972 he finished fourth in the single sculls. Hild won three national titles, one in the single sculls (1970) and two in the double sculls (1968 and 1969).
