= Yordan Valchev =

Bulgarian rower

Personal information
- Nationality: Bulgarian
- Born: 20 November 1941 (age 83); Gramada, Bulgaria

Sport
- Sport: Rowing

Yordan Valchev (Bulgarian: Йордан Вълчев, born 20 November 1941) is a Bulgarian rower. He competed at the 1968 Summer Olympics, 1972 Summer Olympics and the 1976 Summer Olympics.
