= Otto Plettner =

Mexican rower (born 1940)

Personal information
- Nationality: Mexican
- Born: 26 September 1940 (age 84)

Sport
- Sport: Rowing

Otto Plettner (born 26 September 1940) is a Mexican rower. He competed at the 1964 Summer Olympics and the 1968 Summer Olympics.
