= 2005 British Rowing Championships =

- Venue: National Water Sports Centre
- Location: Holme Pierrepont (Nottingham)
- Dates: 15–17 July 2005

The 2005 British Rowing Championships known as the National Championships at the time, were the 34th edition of the National Championships, held from 15–17 July 2005 at the National Water Sports Centre in Holme Pierrepont, Nottingham. They were organised and sanctioned by British Rowing, and are open to British rowers.

== Senior ==
=== Medal summary ===
Event	Gold	Silver	Bronze
Open 1x	Cantabrigian; Charlie Palmer	Bath University; Marcus Bateman	London; Andy Ardron
Open 2-	Worcester; Jeremy Richardson & Pete Crozier	Imperial College / Tideway Scullers School; Tom Gale,	Molesey; Clive Kennedy-Burn & G Weeks
Open 2x	Vesta / Tideway Scullers School; Angus MacAlister & Julian Geluk	Hollingworth Lake / Grosvenor; Craig Morgan & Paul Turner	Tideway Scullers School
Open 4-	Nautilus; Kristina Stiller	Thames; Tom Edwards-Moss, Laurence Wells, Andy Green, Bryan Hoffman	Marlow; Rob McAlister, Dave Vernon, Paul Addy, Paul O'Boyle
Open 4x	Nautilus	Tideway Scullers School; John O'Leary, Toby Arbeid, Alex Palmer, Toby Marshall	St Ives; A Cowburn, Paul Ashmore, Chris Newland, Mike Kilby
Open 4+	Molesey; Clive Kennedy-Burn, N Dalton, G Weeks, T Wallace, T Millward	Imperial College / Tideway Scullers School; Tom Gale,	Leander; Daniel Marrett, N Lloyd, Serryth Colbert, Adam Gibbs, S Richards
Open 8+	Nautilus	Imperial College; J McNuff, H Ellender, B Smith, E Johnson, J Fox, O Moore, H Mackenzie, B Curtis, S Pearce	NCRA; Cannon, Taylor, Burkitt, Weir, Atkins, Ellison, Skelton, Richard-Jones, Chislett
Women 1x	Rebecca; Rebecca Rowe	Osiris; Hilary Powell	Thames; Easton
Women 2x	Maidenhead / Molesey	Molesey; A Bray & S Birch	Upper Thames / Mortlake Anglian & Alpha
Women 2-	Mortlake Anglian & Alpha; P Phillips & Georgina Menheneott	Osiris; E Ross & A Freeman	Thames / Globe
Women 4x	Nautilus; Fern Cotterill, Jacqueline Round, Francesca Jus-Burke, Kristina Stiller	Upper Thames / Mortlake Anglian & Alpha / Tideway Scullers School; Andrea Finn, Guin Batten	Headington School / NCRA / Durham / Rob Roy
Women 4-	Worcester / St Edward's School / Gloucester / St Neots	City of Oxford; Andrea Dennis, D Smith, Elizabeth Southey, Liz Taylor	Furnivall SC; M Buxton, K Saunders, K Currie, J Saunders
Women 4+	Thames; B Moffat/H Austin/F Temple/A Schmiegelow/C Ware	Furnivall SC; J Hawkins, K Clitter, A Brown, S Rowe, T Robinson	Osiris; A Cairns, N Pollock, E Windham, E Payne, J Cohen
Women 8+	Nautilus; Connell, Jefferies, Bryant, Blevins, Crombie, Graham, McDowall, Fletcher, De Toledo	Thames; B Moffat, E James, R Rowe, R Loveridge, V Etiebet, H Austin, F Temple, A Schmiegelow, C Ware	Furnivall SC; S Rowe, J Hawkins, K Clitter, A Brown, M Buxton, K Saunders, K Currie, J Saunders, S Haffenden

== Lightweight ==
=== Medal summary ===
Event	Gold	Silver	Bronze
Open L1x	Tideway Scullers School	Upper Thames	Chester-le-Street
Open L2x	Glasgow University	Upper Thames	Royal Chester
Open L2-	Nottingham & Union	Leander	NCRA
Open L4-	London	NCRA	Durham University
Open L4x	Tideway Scullers School	NCRA	Peterborough City
Women L1x	Auriol Kensington	Wallingford	Sheffield Hallam University
Women L2x	Strathclyde Park	Mortlake Anglian & Alpha	Upper Thames
Women L2-	Glasgow University	Auriol Kensington	Clydesdale
Women L4x	Thames	Mortlake Anglian & Alpha	Upper Thames
Women L4-	Staines	Mortlake Anglian & Alpha	Glasgow University

== U 23 ==
=== Medal summary ===
Event	Gold	Silver	Bronze
Open 1x	Nottingham University	Bedford	Mortlake Anglian & Alpha
Women 1x	University of London B	Aberdeen University	University of London A

== Coastal ==
=== Medal summary ===
Event	Gold	Silver	Bronze
Open 1x	Westover and Bournemouth A	Christchurch	Westover and Bournemouth D

== Junior ==
=== Medal summary ===
Event	Gold	Silver	Bronze
Open J18 1x	Tideway Scullers School	Stourport	Burton Leander
Open J18 2-	Strathclyde Park / Castle Semple	Shiplake College	Lancaster RGS
Open J18 2x	Marlow	Reading	Maidenhead
Open J18 4-	Bedford School	Strathclyde Park / Castle Semple / Heriot-Watt University	RGS Worcester
Open J18 4x	Tiffin School	Llandaff / Wycliffe College / Monmouth / Upper Thames	St George's College / Walton
Open J18 4+	Bedford Modern School	King's School Worcester	RGS Worcester
Open J16 1x	Peterborough City	Tideway Scullers School	Durham
Open J16 2-	RGS Worcester	St Leonard's School	Grenville College
Open J16 2x	Nithsdale / Glasgow	Molesey Schools RA	Yarm School
Open J16 4-	Royal Chester	Latymer Upper School	Tees / Queen Elizabeth HS
Open J16 4+	King's School Chester	George Heriot's School	Windsor Boys' School
Open J16 4x	Tiffin School	Avon County	St Leonard's School
Open J15 1x	Walton	Marlow	Durham
Open J15 2x	Grange School	George Watson's College	Ardingly
Open J15 4x+	Windsor Boys' School	Latymer Upper School	George Watson's College
Open J14 1x	Tideway Scullers School	St Neots	Maidstone Invicta
Open J14 2x	Tideway Scullers School	Runcorn	Yarm School
Open J14 4x+	Windsor Boys' School	Evesham	Latymer Upper School
Women J18 1x	Hollingworth Lake	St Peters School	Reading
Women J18 2-	Reading	George Heriot's School	Tees
Women J18 2x	Maidenhead / Upper Thames	Maidenhead	Queen Elizabeth HS
Women J18 4-	Henley	Gloucester	Haberdasher's Monmouth Girls
Women J18 4x	St Neots	Canford School / George Watson's College	Calpe
Women J18 4+	George Heriot's School	Reading	Haberdasher's Monmouth Girls
Women J16 1x	King's School Worcester	Northwich	Monmouth
Women J16 2x	Stourport	Lea	Northwich
Women J16 4+	George Heriot's School	Henley	Evesham
Women J16 4x	Stourport	Reading	St Leonard's School
Women J15 1x	St Neots	Henley	Strathclyde Park
Women J15 2x	Maidenhead	Warrington	Maidstone Invicta
Women J15 4x+	Maidenhead	Dame Alice Harpur	Marlow
Women J14 1x	Peterborough City	Strathclyde Park	Calpe
Women J14 2x	Maidenhead	Durham	Sudbury
Women J14 4x+	Maidenhead	St Leonard's School	Henley

Key

Symbol	meaning
1, 2, 4, 8	crew size
+	coxed
-	coxless
x	sculls
14	Under-14
15	Under-15
16	Under-16
J	Junior
