= 1993 British Rowing Championships =

- Venue: Strathclyde Country Park
- Location: Motherwell, North Lanarkshire
- Dates: 16–18 July 1993

The 1993 National Rowing Championships was the 22nd edition of the National Championships, held from 16–18 July 1993 at the Strathclyde Country Park in Motherwell, North Lanarkshire.

== Senior ==
=== Medal summary ===
Event	Gold	Silver	Bronze
Men 1x	Thames; L Fletcher	Tideway Scullers School; Tony Larkman	Thames; Sam Allpass
Men 2+	City of Oxford; Mike Edge & Adrian Graham	Thames Tradesmen	Staines
Men 2x	Molesey; Hopkins & Mark Pollecutt	Leander	Thames
Men 2-	Cambridge '99	NCRA	Nottingham & Union
Men 4-	NCRA B	NCRA A	London
Men 4+	NCRA	Bedford	Kingston
Men 4x	Thames / Tideway Scullers School	Thames	Kingston
Men 8+	NCRA	Upper Thames	Agecroft
Women 1x	NCRA; Guin Batten	Weybridge Ladies; Kim Thomas	Clydesdale; Gillian Lindsay
Women 2x	NCRA; Guin Batten & Hart	Staines	Thames
Women 2-	Thames Tradesmen / Tideway Scullers School	Norwich	Cambridge University
Women 4-	Thames Tradesmen	Bedford A	Bedford B
Women 4x	Thames B	Thames C	Thames A
Women 4+	Staines	Bedford	Glasgow University
Women 8+	Cambridge University	Staines	Bedford

== Lightweight ==
=== Medal summary ===
Event	Gold	Silver	Bronze
Men 1x	Thames Tradesmen	Rob Roy A	Rob Roy B
Men 2x	London A	London B	Thames
Men 2-	London	Lea	NCRA
Men 4-	London	Clydesdale	Bedford
Men 4x	Thames	City of Oxford	Marlow
Men 8+	Nottingham & Union	London / Sons of the Thames	Upper Thames
Women 1x	Runcorn	Bedford	Auriol Kensington
Women 2x	Clyde	City of Sheffield & Sheffield University	London University / Kingston
Women 2-	Thames Tradesmen		
Women 4-	Thames Tradesmen	Bedford	Reading / Wallingford

== Under-23 ==
=== Medal summary ===
Event	Gold	Silver	Bronze
Men 1x	Glasgow University	Bewdley	Monmouth School

== Junior ==
=== Medal summary ===
Event	Gold	Silver	Bronze
Men 1x	Queen Elizabeth HS		
Men 2-	Marlow		
Men 2x	Strodes College / Weybridge		
Men 2+	King's School Chester		
Men 4-	Kingston Grammar School		
Men 4+	Durham School		
Men 4x	St George's College		
Men 8+	Eton College		
Men J16 1x	Claires Court School		
Men J16 2x	Wallingford / St Edward's		
Men J16 2-	George Watson's College		
Men J16 4+	Eton College		
Men J16 4-	Eton College		
Men J16 4x	Windsor Boys' School		
Men J15 2x	Windsor Boys' School		
Men J15 4x	Kingston		
Men J14 1x	Maidstone Invicta		
Men J14 2x	George Heriot's School		
Men J14 4x	Sir William Borlase		
Women 1x	Lea		
Women 2x	Cambois / Eton Excelsior		
Women 2-	Lea		
Women 4+	St Leonard's School		
Women 8+	Haberdasher's Monmouth Girls		
Women J16 1x	Henley		
Women J16 2x	Queen Elizabeth HS / St Leonard's School		
Women J16 4+	George Heriot's School		
Women J16 4x	Henley		
Women J16 8+	George Watson's College		
Women J15 1x	George Watson's College		
Women J15 2x	Queen Elizabeth HS		
Women J15 4x	Henley		
Women J14 1x	Stourport		
Women J14 2x	Queen Elizabeth HS		
Women J14 4x	George Watson's College.		

== Coastal ==
=== Medal summary ===
Event	Gold	Silver	Bronze
Men 1x	Poole		
Men 2-	Southsea		
Men 4+	Southsea		
Women 4+	Christchurch		
Men J1x-	Southsea		
Men J2-	Southsea		
Men J4+	Southsea		

Key

Symbol	meaning
1, 2, 4, 8	crew size
+	coxed
-	coxless
x	sculls
14	Under-14
15	Under-15
16	Under-16
J	Junior
