= 1990 British Rowing Championships =

- Venue: National Water Sports Centre
- Location: Holme Pierrepont (Nottingham)
- Dates: 20–22 July 1990

The 1990 National Rowing Championships was the 19th edition of the National Championships, held from 20–22 July 1990 at the National Water Sports Centre in Holme Pierrepont, Nottingham. There was a record entry of 653 crews and over 2,000 competitors competing for 64 titles. Simon Larkin won a record equalling fourth singles sculls title (Kenny Dwan also won four times).

== Senior ==
=== Medal summary ===
Event	Gold	Silver	Bronze
Men 1x	NCRA; Simon Larkin	Leander; Guy Pooley	Molesey; Mark Pollecutt
Men 2+	Thames Tradesmen	Bedford	Tideway Scullers School
Men 2x	Molesey; Graham & Burbank	Leander / Wallingford	Barclays Bank / Tideway Scullers School
Men 2-	Lea / Tyrian; Curtis & Williams	Leander	Lea
Men 4-	NCRA	Nottingham & Union	GB national junior squad
Men 4+	Lea	Nottingham & Union	Bedford
Men 4x	Upper Thames A	Tideway Scullers School	Upper Thames B
Men 8+	NCRA	Walton	Scottish composite
Women 1x	GB national squad Tish Reid	Westminster School; Fiona Freckleton	GB national squad Kate Miller
Women 2x	GB national squad Adrienne Grimsditch & Suzanne Kirk	Birmingham / Agecroft	Tideway Scullers School
Women 2-	GB national squad B Joanne Gough & Annabel Eyres	GB national squad A Lesley Baguley & Kate Miller	Birmingham
Women 4-	GB national squad Kate Grose, Miriam Batten, Kareen Marwick, Caroline Christie	Tideway Scullers School / Thames	Kingston
Women 4x	Tideway Scullers School	Kingston	GB national junior squad
Women 4+	London University	Thames	Edinburgh University
Women 8+	Cambridge University	Cambridge University Ltw	Tideway Scullers School

== Lightweight ==
=== Medal summary ===
Event	Gold	Silver	Bronze
Men 1x	St Ives	Queens Tower	Leander
Men 2x	NCRA	Leander / Wallingford	Leicester
Men 4-	NCRA	Imperial College	London
Men 4x	Auriol Kensington	Mortlake Anglian & Alpha / Putney Town	Upper Thames
Men 8+	NCRA	Cambridge University	Kingston
Women 1x	NCRA	Glasgow University	Mortlake Anglian & Alpha
Women 2x	Marlow / Thames	Tideway Scullers School / Thames	Birmingham / Agecroft
Women 2-	Birmingham	Clyde	Kingston
Women 4-	Thames Tradesmen	City of Sheffield / Sheffield University	Clyde

== Junior ==
=== Medal summary ===
Event	Gold	Silver	Bronze
Men 1x	Worcester		
Men 2-	GB national junior squad		
Men 2x	GB national junior squad		
Men 2+	Thames		
Men 4-	GB national junior squad		
Men 4+	Windsor Boys' School		
Men 4x	GB national junior squad		
Men 8+	GB national junior squad		
Men J16 1x	St George's College		
Men J16 2-	Claires Court School		
Men J16 2x	Quintin		
Men J16 4+	King's School Worcester		
Men J16 4-	King's School Chester		
Men J16 4x	Emanuel School		
Men J16 8+	Emanuel School / Marlow		
Men J14 1x	Stirling		
Men J14 2x	Trent		
Men J14 4x	Windsor Boys' School		
Women 1x	GB national junior squad		
Women 2x	GB national junior squad		
Women 2-	GB national junior squad		
Women 4x	GB national junior squad		
Women 4+	George Watson's College		
Women 8+	George Watson's College		
Women J16 1x	Worcester		
Women J16 2x	Bedford		
Women J16 2-	Evesham / Stratford-upon-Avon		
Women J16 4+	Lady Eleanor Holles School		
Women J16 4x	Marlow		
Women J16 8+	George Heriot's School / George Watson's College		
Women J14 1x	Burway		
Women J14 2x	Lady Eleanor Holles School		
Women J14 4x	Lady Eleanor Holles School		

== Coastal ==
=== Medal summary ===
Event	Gold	Silver	Bronze
Men 1x	Southsea		
Men 2-	Southsea	Christchurch	
Men 4+	Christchurch		
Women 4+	Christchurch		
Men J1x-	BTC Southampton		
Men J2-	Southsea		
Men J4+	Lymington		

Key

Symbol	meaning
1, 2, 4, 8	crew size
+	coxed
-	coxless
x	sculls
14	Under-14
15	Under-15
16	Under-16
J	Junior
