= 1987 British Rowing Championships =

- Venue: National Water Sports Centre
- Location: Holme Pierrepont (Nottingham)
- Dates: 17–19 July 1987

The 1987 National Rowing Championships was the 16th edition of the National Championships, held from 17–19 July 1987 at the National Water Sports Centre in Holme Pierrepont, Nottingham.

== Senior ==
=== Medal summary ===
Event	Gold	Silver	Bronze
Men Victor Ludorum	Tideway Scullers School		
Men 1x	NCRA; Simon Larkin	NCRA; Martin Knight	Exeter; Ian Dryden
Men 2+	Tideway Scullers School	Nottingham & Union	Thames
Men 2x	Lea; Julian Scrivener & Rorie Henderson	Agecroft; E Caldwell & G Sims	Tideway Scullers School; A C Rudkin & C F Williams
Men 2-	Bedford Star	Oxford University	Clydesdale / Castle Semple
Men 4-	Lea	Walton	Leander
Men 4+	Lea	Thames	Kingston
Men 4x	Tideway Scullers School	NCRA	Rob Roy
Men 8+	Leander	Tideway Scullers School	Vesta / Exeter
Women Victor Ludorum	Kingston		
Women 1x	NCRA; Rachel Hirst	Wallingford; Zaza Horne	Birmingham University; Helen Bruce
Women 2x	Tideway Scullers School; Julia Spence & Pauline Bird	Bidford High School / Northwich; Suzanne Kirk & Adrienne Grimsditch	Clydesdale / Glasgow; Christine Brown & Maureen McGarvey
Women 2-	Kingston / Weybridge Ladies; Alison Bonner & Kim Thomas	Royal Holloway / Strodes; Becky Bangay & Sarah Merryman	Clyde; Anneliese Rennie & Catriona MacCallum
Women 4+	Kingston / Oxford University / Oxford ULWRC / Wallingford	Thames	Birmingham / Birmingham University / Evesham
Women 4x	Clyde / Glasgow / Staines / Marlow	Kingston	Civil Service Ladies / Thames Tradesmen
Women 8+	A.R.A Squad; Anna Page, Ruth Howe, Jackie Prout, Jo Gough, Debbie Flewin, Tish Reid, Kate Grose, Sue Smith, Alison Norrish (cox)	A.R.A Juniors	Cambridge University

== Lightweight ==
=== Medal summary ===
Event	Gold	Silver	Bronze
Men 1x	NCRA	London	St Ives
Men 2x	Marlow; Justin Hooker & Peter Clarke	NCRA; Chris McManus & Martin Hyndman	Rob Roy
Men 4-	London University / Reading University	Clydesdale	Glasgow University / Strathclyde University
Men 8+	Composite		
Women 1x	Wallingford	Birmingham	Reading
Women 2x	Kingston	St Ives	
Women 4-	A.R.A Squad	Reading University / Staines / Thames	Cambridge University

== Junior ==
=== Medal summary ===
Event	Gold	Silver	Bronze
Men 1x	A.R.A Squad		
Men 2-	A.R.A Squad		
Men 2x	A.R.A Squad		
Men 2+	Royal Shrewsbury School		
Men 4-	A.R.A Squad		
Men 4+	A.R.A Squad		
Men 4x	A.R.A Squad		
Men 8+	Bedford School		
Men J16 1x	King's Ely		
Men J16 2-	Royal Shrewsbury School		
Men J16 2x	Kingston Grammar School		
Men J16 4+	Pangbourne College		
Men J16 4-	Marlow		
Men J16 4x	Kingston Grammar School		
Men J16 8+	Eton College		
Men J14 1x	Wallingford		
Men J14 2x	Kingston Grammar School		
Open J14 4x	Forest School		
Open J13 1x	St Ives		
Women 1x	St Neots		
Women 2x	Bedford High School / Northwich		
Women 2-	Clyde		
Women 4x	Composite		
Women 4+	Pilgrim School		
Women 8+	Composite		
Women J16 1x	Queen's Park High School		
Women J16 2x	St Neots		
Women J16 4x+	Lady Eleanor Holles School		
Women J16 8+	Composite		
Women J14 1x	St Neots		
Women J14 2x	Kingston Grammar School		

== Coastal ==
=== Medal summary ===
Event	Gold	Silver	Bronze
Men 1x	Southsea	Westover & Bournemouth	Adur
Men 2-	Southsea	Dover	Adur
Men 4+	Christchurch		
Women 4+	Southsea	Christchurch A	Christchurch B

Key

Symbol	meaning
1, 2, 4, 8	crew size
+	coxed
-	coxless
x	sculls
14	Under-14
15	Under-15
16	Under-16
J	Junior
