= 1991 British Rowing Championships =

- Venue: National Water Sports Centre
- Location: Holme Pierrepont (Nottingham)
- Dates: 19–21 July 1991

The 1991 National Rowing Championships was the 20th edition of the National Championships, held from 19–21 July 1991 at the National Water Sports Centre in Holme Pierrepont, Nottingham.

== Senior ==
=== Medal summary ===
Event	Gold	Silver	Bronze
Men 1x	Kingston; Farrell Mossop	Stirling; William Brown	Leander; Calman Maclennan
Men 2+	London University	Rob Roy	Worcester
Men 2x	Molesey	Leander	City of Oxford
Men 2-	Bedford B	Bedford A	Rob Roy
Men 4-	Goldie	Lea	NCRA
Men 4+	NCRA	Nottingham & Union	Edinburgh University
Men 4x	Tideway Scullers School	Kingston / Molesey	Castle Semple / Glasgow
Men 8+	NCRA / Leander / London	London University	Lea
Women 1x	Mortlake Anglian & Alpha; Sue Appelboom	Tideway Scullers School; Kate Miller	Birmingham University; Helen Bruce
Women 2x	NCRA; Claire Parker & Tonia Williams	Tideway Scullers School	Agecroft / Hollingworth Lake
Women 2-	Norwich / Norwich Union	Edinburgh University / Alexandria	Birmingham
Women 4+	Edinburgh University / Alexandria	Thames Tradesmen	Durham
Women 4-	Thames Tradesmen C	Thames Tradesmen A	Thames Tradesmen B
Women 4x	Tideway Scullers School	Kingston	Derwent / Derby
Women 8+	Cambridge University	Thames	Durham University

== Lightweight ==
=== Medal summary ===
Event	Gold	Silver	Bronze
Men 1x	St Ives	NCRA	Rob Roy
Men 2x	London / Tyrian	Stourport	Leicester
Men 4-	London University / Imperial College	Thames Tradesmen	Clydesdale
Men 4x	Kingston	Upper Thames A	Upper Thames B
Men 8+	Bedford	City of Oxford	Walton / Twickenham
Women 1x	Mortlake Anglian & Alpha	Runcorn	Tideway Scullers School
Women 2x	Rob Roy / Tideway Scullers School	Evesham / Hereford	Wallingford / Queens Park High School
Women 2-	Thames Tradesmen	Sons of the Thames	Lea
Women 4-	Thames Tradesmen	City of Sheffield	Bedford

== Junior ==
=== Medal summary ===
Event	Gold	Silver	Bronze
Men 1x	Tideway Scullers School Christian Pierce		
Men 2-	Bedford School		
Men 2x	Thames		
Men 2+	Windsor Boys' School		
Men 4-	Abingdon School		
Men 4+	Abingdon School		
Men 4x	King's School Chester		
Men 8+	Thames		
Men J16 1x	Hereford Cathedral School		
Men J16 2-	Emanuel School		
Men J16 2x	Trent		
Men J16 4+	Emanuel School		
Men J16 4-	Hampton School		
Men J16 4x	King's School Chester		
Men J16 8+	Eton College		
Men J14 1x	Weybridge		
Men J14 2x	Claires Court School		
Men J14 4x	King's School Chester		
Women 1x	Upper Thames		
Women 2x	Bedford		
Women 2-	Nithsdale		
Women 4+	George Watson's College		
Women 8+	George Watson's College / George Heriot's School		
Women J16 1x	Bewdley		
Women J16 2x	Bedford		
Women J16 4+	George Heriot's School		
Women J16 4x	Bedford		
Women J16 8+	Lady Eleanor Holles School		
Women J14 1x	Lady Eleanor Holles School		
Women J14 2x	Kingston		
Women J14 4x	Queen Elizabeth HS		

== Coastal ==
=== Medal summary ===
Event	Gold	Silver	Bronze
Men 1x	Christchurch		
Men 2-	Christchurch		
Men 4+	Lymington		
Women 4+	Southampton University		
Men J1x-	Ryde		
Men J2-	Westover & Bournemouth		
Men J4+	BTC Southampton		

Key

Symbol	meaning
1, 2, 4, 8	crew size
+	coxed
-	coxless
x	sculls
14	Under-14
15	Under-15
16	Under-16
J	Junior
