= 2006 British Rowing Championships =

- Venue: Strathclyde Country Park
- Location: Motherwell, North Lanarkshire
- Dates: 14–16 July 2006

The 2006 British Rowing Championships were the 35th edition of the National Championships, held from 14–16 July 2006 at the Strathclyde Country Park in Motherwell, North Lanarkshire. They were organised and sanctioned by British Rowing, and are open to British rowers.

== Senior ==
=== Medal summary ===
Event	Gold	Silver	Bronze
Open 1x	Molesey; Richard Ockendon	Dart Totnes; Bill Lucas	Agecroft; Robin Dowell
Open 2-	Tideway Scullers School	London University	Clyde / Glasgow
Open 2x	Glasgow University	Liverpool Victoria	Burton Leander
Open 4-	Marlow / Molesey	Tideway Scullers School	Durham University / Nepthys
Open 4x	Tideway Scullers School	Molesey	Northwich
Open 4+	London University	Henley	Army
Open 8+	Oxford Brookes University	Agecroft	Tideway Scullers School
Women 1x	Thames; Rachel Loveridge	Tideway Scullers School; Andrea Finn	Marlow; Stephanie Mottram
Women 2x	Auriol Kensington / Mortlake Anglian & Alpha	Thames / Mortlake Anglian & Alpha	Mortlake Anglian & Alpha
Women 2-	Aberdeen / Clydesdale	Bath University	Tideway Scullers School
Women 4x	Mortlake Anglian & Alpha	City of Sunderland / Sunderland	Tideway Scullers School
Women 4-	Oxford Brookes University	Aberdeen / Clydesdale	Furnivall SC
Women 4+	Thames	Agecroft	Osiris
Women 8+	Furnivall SC	Osiris / Oxford University	Reading

== Lightweight ==
=== Medal summary ===
Event	Gold	Silver	Bronze
Open L1x	York City	Upper Thames	Oxford Brookes University
Open L2x	Glasgow University	Tideway Scullers School	St Andrew / George Watson's
Open L2-	Durham University	Plymouth	London
Open L4-	London	Durham University	Newcastle University / Durham University
Open L4x	Tideway Scullers School	Rebecca	Royal Chester / Norwich
Women L1x	Thames	Loughborough	Durham University
Women L2x	Auriol Kensington / Mortlake Anglian & Alpha	Strathclyde Park	Mortlake Anglian & Alpha
Women L2-	Glasgow University / Aberdeen University	Furnivall SC	Thames
Women L4x	Thames	Strathclyde Park / Mortlake Anglian & Alpha	Mortlake Anglian & Alpha
Women L4-	Mortlake Anglian & Alpha	Staines / Vesta / London	Reading

== U 23 ==
=== Medal summary ===
Event	Gold	Silver	Bronze
Open 1x	Burton Leander	Molesey	London University
Open 2x	Edinburgh University / Glasgow University	Itchen Imperial / Bourne	Upper Thames / Henley
Women 1x	Aberdeen University	London University	Durham University
Women 2x	Auriol Kensington / Mortlake Anglian & Alpha	Strathclyde Park	Mortlake Anglian & Alpha

== Junior ==
=== Medal summary ===
Event	Gold	Silver	Bronze
Open J18 1x	Yarm School	Trent	Walton
Open J18 2-	Strathclyde Park / Castle Semple	Eton College / Pangbourne College	Stratford-upon-Avon
Open J18 2x	Marlow	Reading	Monmouth
Open J18 4-	Strathclyde Park / Castle Semple	Kingston Grammar School	Rebecca
Open J18 4x	Yarm School	Star Club / St Neots	Peterborough City / Tideway Scullers School
Open J18 4+	St Leonard's School	George Heriot's School	Rebecca
Open J16 1x	Nottingham Schools' RA	Burton Leander	Hollingworth Lake
Open J16 2-	Tyne A	Tyne B	RGS Worcester
Open J16 2x	The Grange School	George Watson's	Hereford
Open J16 4-	Tyne	Walton	Claires Court School
Open J16 4+	Star Club	Queen Elizabeth HS	King's School Worcester
Open J16 4x	Windsor Boys' School	Claires Court School / Marlow	Evesham
Open J15 1x	Windsor Boys' School	Magdalen College School	Walton
Open J15 2x	Evesham	Maidstone Invicta	Maidenhead
Open J15 4x+	Maidenhead	Windsor Boys' School	Warrington
Open J14 1x	St Neots	Maidenhead	Peterborough City
Open J14 2x	Tideway Scullers School	St Ives	Aberdeen Schools
Open J14 4x+	Tideway Scullers School	George Watson's	Evesham
Women J18 1x	Rob Roy	Strathclyde Park	Canford School
Women J18 2-	Aberdeen Schools A	Nottingham Schools' RA	Aberdeen Schools B
Women J18 2x	George Watson's / Nithsdale	St Neots	City of Oxford
Women J18 4-	George Heriot's School	Aberdeen Schools RA	N/A
Women J18 4x	Henley	Calpe	Rob Roy / Maidenhead
Women J18 4+	George Heriot's School	Henley	N/A
Women J16 1x	Rob Roy	Queen Elizabeth HS	Stratford-upon-Avon
Women J16 2x	St Neots	Marlow	Avon County
Women J16 4+	Henley	George Heriot's School	Mediterranean
Women J16 4x	Henley	Marlow	Star Club
Women J15 1x	Sudbury	Durham	Canford School
Women J15 2x	Yarm School	Maidenhead	King's School Canterbury
Women J15 4x+	Lady Eleanor Holles School	Maidenhead	Marlow
Women J14 1x	Lady Eleanor Holles School	Peterborough City	Maidenhead
Women J14 2x	Star Club / St Neots	Maidenhead	Star Club
Women J14 4x+	Lady Eleanor Holles School	Henley	Star Club / St Neots

Key

Symbol	meaning
1, 2, 4, 8	crew size
+	coxed
-	coxless
x	sculls
14	Under-14
15	Under-15
16	Under-16
J	Junior
