= Fawley Challenge Cup =

Rowing competition

- Venue: Henley Royal Regatta, River Thames
- Location: Henley-on-Thames, Oxfordshire
- Dates: 1992 – present

The Fawley Challenge Cup is a rowing event for junior boys quadruple sculls at the annual Henley Royal Regatta on the River Thames, at Henley-on-Thames in England, open to those who have not attained 18 years of age by 1 September of the year before the regatta and is open to individual crews from boat clubs and schools; an event offered for the first time at the 1992 Regatta.

The trophy presented for this event is the cup given to the Regatta by his family in memory of Nicholas Young who rowed for Westminster School and St Catherine's College, Oxford. The Windsor Boys' School hold the record of 10 wins.

== Past winners ==
Year	Winner	Runner-Up	Ref
1992	Mölndals Rk & Strömstads Rk, Sweden	Walton & Trent	
1993	Walton & Burton Leander	The Windsor Boys' School	
1994	The Windsor Boys' School & Maidenhead	Bedford School	
1995	The Windsor Boys' School & Poplar, Blackwall & District	Durham & Norwich	
1996	The Windsor Boys' School & Poplar, Blackwall & District	Marlow & NCRA	
1997	The Windsor Boys' School & Claires Court School	Mortlake Anglian & Alpha & Queen Elizabeth HS	
1998	The Windsor Boys' School & Claires Court School	Wycliffe College	
1999	Leander Club & Tiffin School	Burway & Walton	
2000	Leander Club & Llandaff	Tiffin School	
2001	Southport School & St. Joseph's College (Australia)	Maidenhead & Marlow	
2002	Leander Club & Evesham	The Windsor Boys' School	
2003	Marlow & The King's School, Worcester	Malvern Preparatory School, USA	
2004	Marlow & Tideway Scullers School	Sydney Rowing Club	
2005	Sydney Rowing Club	Maidenhead & Newark	
2006	The King's School, Parramatta (Australia)	Sydney Rowing Club & Mosman Rowing Club, Australia	
2007	Henley & Maidenhead	Peterborough City & Star Club	
2008	Peterborough City & Nottingham	Marlow Rowing Club	
2009	Westminster School	Melbourne Grammar School	
2010	Banks Rowing Club & Melbourne University (Australia)	Westminster School & Walton	
2011	Sydney Rowing Club (Australia)	Walton	
2012	Sir William Borlase's	Marlow	
2013	Marlow	Sir William Borlase's	
2014	Sir William Borlase's	The Windsor Boys' School	
2015	Sir William Borlase's	Nottingham	
2016	Claires Court School	The Windsor Boys' School	
2017	The Windsor Boys' School	Claires Court School	
2018	The Windsor Boys' School	Maidenhead	
2019	Leander Club	Henley Rowing Club	
2020	No competition due to COVID-19 pandemic		
2021	Tideway Scullers School	The Windsor Boys' School	
2022	The Windsor Boys' School A	The Windsor Boys' School B	
2023	Leander Club	Hinksey Sculling School	
2024	The Windsor Boys' School	Marlow Rowing Club	
2025	The Windsor Boys' School	Hinksey Sculling School	
