= Britannia Challenge Cup =

Rowing competition

- Venue: Henley Royal Regatta, River Thames
- Location: Henley-on-Thames, Oxfordshire
- Dates: 1968 – present

The Britannia Challenge Cup is a rowing event for men's coxed fours at the annual Henley Royal Regatta on the River Thames at Henley-on-Thames in England. It is open to male crews from a single rowing club.

Since 2004, Boat clubs from any university, college, or secondary school are not permitted, with a separate event (now the Prince Albert Challenge Cup) for student crews.

The Britannia Challenge Cup was first awarded in 1969, as an event for club and student men's coxed fours, and is named after the Nottingham Britannia Rowing Club, to mark the club's centenary.

== Winners ==
=== As Henley Prize ===
Year	Winner	Runner-Up	ref
1968	Crowland Rowing Club	Thames Rowing Club	

=== As Britannia Challenge Cup ===
Year	Winner	Runner-Up	ref
1969	Kingston Rowing Club	Bedford Rowing Club	
1970	London Rowing Club	Bedford Rowing Club	
1971	Hereford Rowing Club	Nottingham & Union Rowing Club	
1972	Wallingford Rowing Club	Nottingham & Union Rowing Club	
1973	Isis Boat Club	University of London Boat Club	
1974	Wallingford Schools	University College, Dublin, IRL	
1975	Leander Club	Tideway Scullers School	
1976	Tideway Scullers School	Wallingford Schools	
1977	Tideway Scullers School	Henley Rowing Club	
1978	Kingston Rowing Club	Thames Tradesmen's RC	
1979	City Orient Rowing Club	St Neots Rowing Club	
1980	Leander Club	Wallingford Schools	
1981	Vesta Rowing Club	Saxon Boat Club	
1982	Neptune Rowing Club, IRL	Molesey Boat Club	
1983	Lea Rowing Club	Univ of London BC	
1984	Tideway Scullers School	Neptune Rowing Club, IRL	
1985	Maidenhead Rowing Club	Lea Rowing Club	
1986	Bedford Star	Lea Rowing Club	
1987	Lea Rowing Club	Kingston Rowing Club	
1988	University of London Boat Club	Lea Rowing Club	
1989	Leander Club	Lea Rowing Club	
1990	University College, Galway, IRL	Cappoquin Rowing Club, IRL	
1991	Nottinghamshire County Rowing Association	Nottingham & Union Rowing Club	
1992	Goldie Boat Club	London Rowing Club	
1993	Harvard University, USA	Goldie Boat Club	
1994	Belfast Rowing Club	Univ of London Boat Club	
1995	Wallingford Rowing Club	Univ of London Boat Club	
1996	Oxford Brookes University Boat Club	Univ of London Boat Club	
1997	University of London Boat Club	Rg Hansa Hamburg, GER	
1998	Oxford Brookes University Boat Club	Neptune Rowing Club, IRL	
1999	Molesey Boat Club	Isis Boat Club	
2000	Cambridge University Boat Club	Imperial College Boat Club	
2001	Nottinghamshire County Rowing Association	Durham University Boat Club	
2002	Harvard University, USA 'B'	Harvard University, USA 'A'	
2003	Goldie Boat Club	Univ of London Boat Club	
2004	Molesey Boat Club	Nottingham & Union Rowing Club	
2005	Leander Club	Thames Rowing Club	
2006	Army Rowing Club	York City Rowing Club	
2007	York City Rowing Club	Henley Rowing Club	
2008	Molesey Boat Club	Ortner Boat Club	
2009	Agecroft Rowing Club	Vesta Rowing Club	
2010	Tideway Scullers School	London Rowing Club	
2011	Banks Rowing Club, Australia	London Rowing Club	
2012	Star Club	Taurus Boat Club	
2013	Taurus Boat Club	Union Boat Club, USA	
2014	Upper Thames Rowing Club	RTHC Bayer Leverkusen, GER	
2015	Sydney Rowing Club, AUS	Thames Rowing Club	
2016	RTHC Bayer Leverkusen, GER	Sport Imperial	
2017	N.S.R. Oslo, NOR	St Andrew Boat Club	
2018	Thames Rowing Club	Molesey Boat Club	
2019	Molesey Boat Club	Mercantile Rowing Club, AUS	
2020	No competition due to COVID-19 pandemic		
2021	Frankfurter Rudergesellschaft Germania 1869, GER	Hinksey Sculling School	
2022	Thames Rowing Club	London Rowing Club ‘A’	
2023	Thames Rowing Club	Molesey Boat Club	
2024	Thames Rowing Club	Royal Chester Rowing Club	
2025	Thames Rowing Club	London Rowing Club	
2026	Koninklijke Amsterdamsche Roei- en Zeilvereeniging 'De Hoop', NED	London Rowing Club 'A'	
