= 1988 British Rowing Championships =

National Water Sports Champions

- Venue: National Water Sports Centre
- Location: Holme Pierrepont (Nottingham)
- Dates: 15–17 July 1988

The 1988 National Rowing Championships was the 17th edition of the National Championships, held from 15–17 July 1988 at the National Water Sports Centre in Holme Pierrepont, Nottingham.

== Senior ==
=== Medal summary ===
Event	Gold	Silver	Bronze
Men 1x	NCRA; Simon Larkin	Lea; Rorie Henderson	
Men 2+	Kingston		
Men 2x	Tideway Scullers School		
Men 2-	NCRA; Christopher Bates & Peter Haining		
Men 4-	Leander		
Men 4+	Kingston		
Men 4x	NCRA		
Men 8+	Tideway Scullers School	Leander U-23	Goldie
Women 1x	Thames Tradesmen		
Women 2x	Thames Tradesmen / Marlow		
Women 2-	Strodes College / London University		
Women 4+	Tideway Scullers School		
Women 4x	Thames Tradesmen		
Women 8+	GB National squad	Thames	GB National junior squad

== Lightweight ==
=== Medal summary ===
Event	Gold	Silver	Bronze
Men 1x	Tideway Scullers School		
Men 2x	Grosvenor		
Men 4-	NCRA		
Men 8+	City of Oxford		
Women 1x	NCRA		
Women 2x	Leander / Llandaff		
Women 4-	Composite		

== Junior ==
=== Medal summary ===
Event	Gold	Silver	Bronze
Men 1x	Castle Semple		
Men 2-	Emanuel School		
Men 2x	Burway		
Men 2+	Bedford Modern School		
Men 4-	Bedford Modern School		
Men 4+	Monmouth School		
Men 4x	Latymer Upper School		
Men 8+	Bedford Modern School		
Men J16 1x	Westminster School		
Men J16 2-	Shiplake College		
Men J16 2x	Cheltenham College / Wycliffe College		
Men J16 2+	Eton College		
Men J16 4+	Sir William Borlase		
Men J16 4-	Sir William Borlase		
Men J16 4x	Kingston Grammar School		
Men J16 8+	Eton College		
Men J14 1x	St George's College		
Men J14 2x	Cambridge '99 / St Neots		
Men J14 4x	King's School Chester		
Women 1x	GB National junior squad		
Women 2x	GB National junior squad		
Women 2-	GB National junior squad		
Women 4+	George Heriot's School / Nithsdale		
Women 8+	GB National junior squad		
Women J16 1x	St Neots		
Women J16 2x	Carmel College / St Neots		
Women J16 4+	Composite		
Women J16 4x	Queen Elizabeth HS		
Women J16 8+	Athena Ladies		
Women J14 1x	St Aelred's School		
Women J14 2x	Lady Eleanor Holles School		
Women J14 4x	Kingston Grammar School		

== Coastal ==
=== Medal summary ===
Event	Gold	Silver	Bronze
Men 1x	Southsea		
Men 2-	Dover		
Men 4+	Eastbourne		
Women 4+	Christchurch		
Men J1x-	Southsea		
Men J2-	Dover		
Men J4+	BTC (Southampton)		

Key

Symbol	meaning
1, 2, 4, 8	crew size
+	coxed
-	coxless
x	sculls
14	Under-14
15	Under-15
16	Under-16
J	Junior
