= 1994 British Rowing Championships =

- Venue: National Water Sports Centre
- Location: Holme Pierrepont (Nottingham)
- Dates: 15–17 July 1994

The 1994 National Rowing Championships was the 23rd edition of the National Championships, held from 15–17 July 1994 at the National Water Sports Centre in Holme Pierrepont, Nottingham.

== Senior ==
=== Medal summary ===
Event	Gold	Silver	Bronze
Men 1x	Upper Thames; Duncan Nicoll		
Men 2+	Thames Tradesmen	Kingston	
Men 2x	Molesey		
Men 2-	Cambridge '99		
Men 4-	Thames		
Men 4+	London		
Men 4x	Tideway Scullers School		
Men 8+	London		
Women 1x	Mortlake Anglian & Alpha; Sue Appelboom	Westminster School; Fiona Freckleton	
Women 2x	Tideway Scullers School / Henley		
Women 2-	Edinburgh University		
Women 4-	Thames Tradesmen / London University		
Women 4+	Bedford		
Women 4x	Grosvenor / Royal Chester / Nottingham & Union / Tideway Scullers School		
Women 8+	GB national squad		

== Lightweight ==
=== Medal summary ===
Event	Gold	Silver	Bronze
Men 1x	Colet		
Men 2x	London		
Men 2-	Marlow		
Men 4-	London		
Men 4x	Tideway Scullers School		
Men 8+	London		
Women 1x	Mortlake Anglian & Alpha		
Women 2x	Agecroft / Runcorn		
Women 2-	Upper Thames		
Women 4-	Thames Tradesmen / London University		

== Under-23 ==
=== Medal summary ===
Event	Gold	Silver	Bronze
Men 1x	Thames		

== Junior ==
=== Medal summary ===
Event	Gold	Silver	Bronze
Men 1x	King's School Rochester		
Men 2-	Nithsdale		
Men 2x	Burton Leander		
Men 4+	Aberdeen Schools		
Men 4x	Peterborough City / Wallingford		
Men 8+	Eton College		
Men J16 1x	Poplar		
Men J16 2-	Westminster School		
Men J16 2x	Durham School		
Men J16 4+	King's School Chester		
Men J16 4-	King's School Chester		
Men J16 4x	Windsor Boys' School		
Men J16 8+	Bedford School		
Men J15 1x	Maidstone Invicta		
Men J15 2x	Hampton School		
Women J15 4x	Sir William Borlase		
Men J14 1x	NCRA		
Men J14 2x	Star Club		
Men J14 4x	Windsor Boys' School		
Women 1x	Grosvenor		
Women 2x	Queen Elizabeth HS		
Women 2-	George Watson's College		
Women 4+	Henley / Kingston Grammar School		
Women 8+	Monmouth		
Women J16 1x	Bewdley		
Women J16 2x	Henley		
Women J16 4+	St Leonard's School / Cambois		
Women J16 8+	George Watson's College		
Women J15 1x	Grosvenor		
Women J15 2x	Kingston Grammar School		
Women J15 4x	Henley		
Women J14 1x	Henley		
Women J14 2x	Christchurch		
Women J14 4x	Henley		

== Coastal ==
=== Medal summary ===
Event	Gold	Silver	Bronze
Men 1x	Poole		
Men 2-	Christchurch		
Men 4+	Vosper		
Women 4+	Worthing		
Men J1x-	Worthing		
Men J2-	Christchurch		
Men J4+	BTC (Southampton)		

Key

Symbol	meaning
1, 2, 4, 8	crew size
+	coxed
-	coxless
x	sculls
14	Under-14
15	Under-15
16	Under-16
J	Junior
