= Nithsdale Amateur Rowing Club =

Scottish rowing club

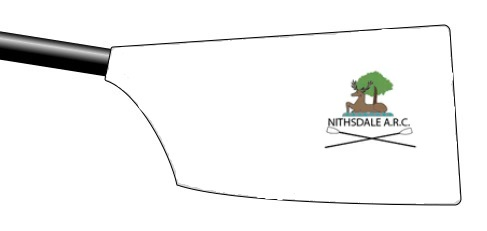
- Location: Nith Avenue, Dumfries, Dumfries and Galloway, Scotland
- Coordinates: 55.071455°N 3.615870°W
- Founded: 1865
- Key people: President: Brian Snowden Captain: Harvey Buchanan
- Affiliations: Scottish Rowing
- Website: www.nithsdalerowing.org

Nithsdale Amateur Rowing Club (stylised as Nithsdale ARC) is a rowing club on the River Nith, based at Nith Avenue, Dumfries, Dumfries and Galloway, Scotland. The club was founded in 1865 and continues to be active to the present day. The club is affiliated to Scottish Rowing.

The club hosts an annual Regatta in June and enjoys close ties with other amateur Rowing organisations such as: Strathclyde Park Rowing Club, Stirling Rowing Club and the now defunct Crichton University campus boat club.

== History ==
The club was founded in 1865 as the Nith Regatta Club but in 1890 the name was changed to its current name. In 1914 the club introduced a new flag.

The club has produced multiple British champions since 1988.

== Honours ==
=== British champions ===
Year	Winning crew/s
1988	Women J18 4+
1991	Women J18 2-
1994	Men J18 2-
1996	Men J18 4+
1997	Women J18 8+,
1998	Men J16 2-, Women J18 2x
2000	Men J18 4-
2002	Women J14 1x
2005	Open J16 2x
2006	Women J18 2x
