= Simon Larkin =

Personal information
- Nationality: English

Sport
- Club: Nottinghamshire County RA

Simon Larkin is an English former rower who holds a record four (equally with Kenny Dwan) national single sculls championships.

== Rowing career ==
Larkin won his first National championship rowing for Nottinghamshire County Rowing Association at the 1987 National Championships. He then won three more successive titles at the 1988 National Championships, 1989 National Championships and 1990 National Championships to equal the record set by Kenny Dwan in 1975.

He rowed for Great Britain in the pair at the 1982 World Rowing Junior Championships.

== Personal life ==
He married British International rower Kareen Marwick in 1996.
