= Furnivall Sculling Club =

British rowing club

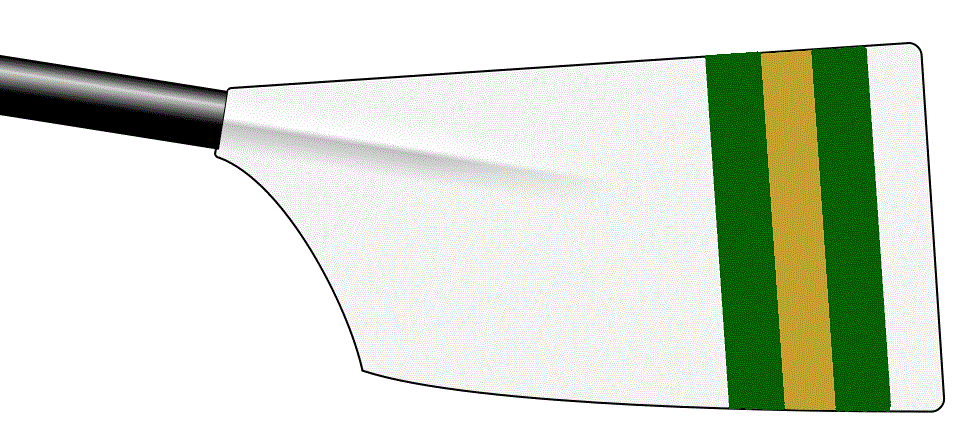
- Location: Hammersmith, London, England
- Coordinates: 51°29′23.7″N 0°13′54.2″W
- Home water: Tideway, River Thames
- Founded: 1896
- Membership: c. 100
- Affiliations: British Rowing boat code: FSC
- Website: www.furnivall.org

Notable members
- Andy Holmes

Furnivall Sculling Club is a rowing club based on the Tideway in Hammersmith, London. It was called Hammersmith Sculling Club until 1946. It was founded in 1896 by Frederick Furnivall, after whom the riverside Furnivall Gardens a few metres away are named. For its initial five years, in the reign of Queen Victoria, the club was for women only and is widely considered to have had the world's first female rowing team (crew). Furnivall has also admitted men since 1901. The club colours are a precise pallette: myrtle and old gold.

== History ==
The club was founded by and is named after Frederick Furnivall (when he was 71, in April 1896). It was at the time called the Hammersmith Sculling Club for Girls. Given his passionate opposition to discrimination, he wanted to break into the man's world of river sport, by building a club for women.

In 1901, men were admitted to full membership, and the name was changed to Furnivall Sculling Club for Girls and Men. However until 1946 the captaincy was restricted to female members in honour of the founding premise. After his death in 1910 the club honoured his memory by celebrating 'The Doctor's Birthday' for many years. Two female-only British rowing clubs exist: Barnes Bridge (which share premises with what was a men-only club) and Weybridge Ladies.

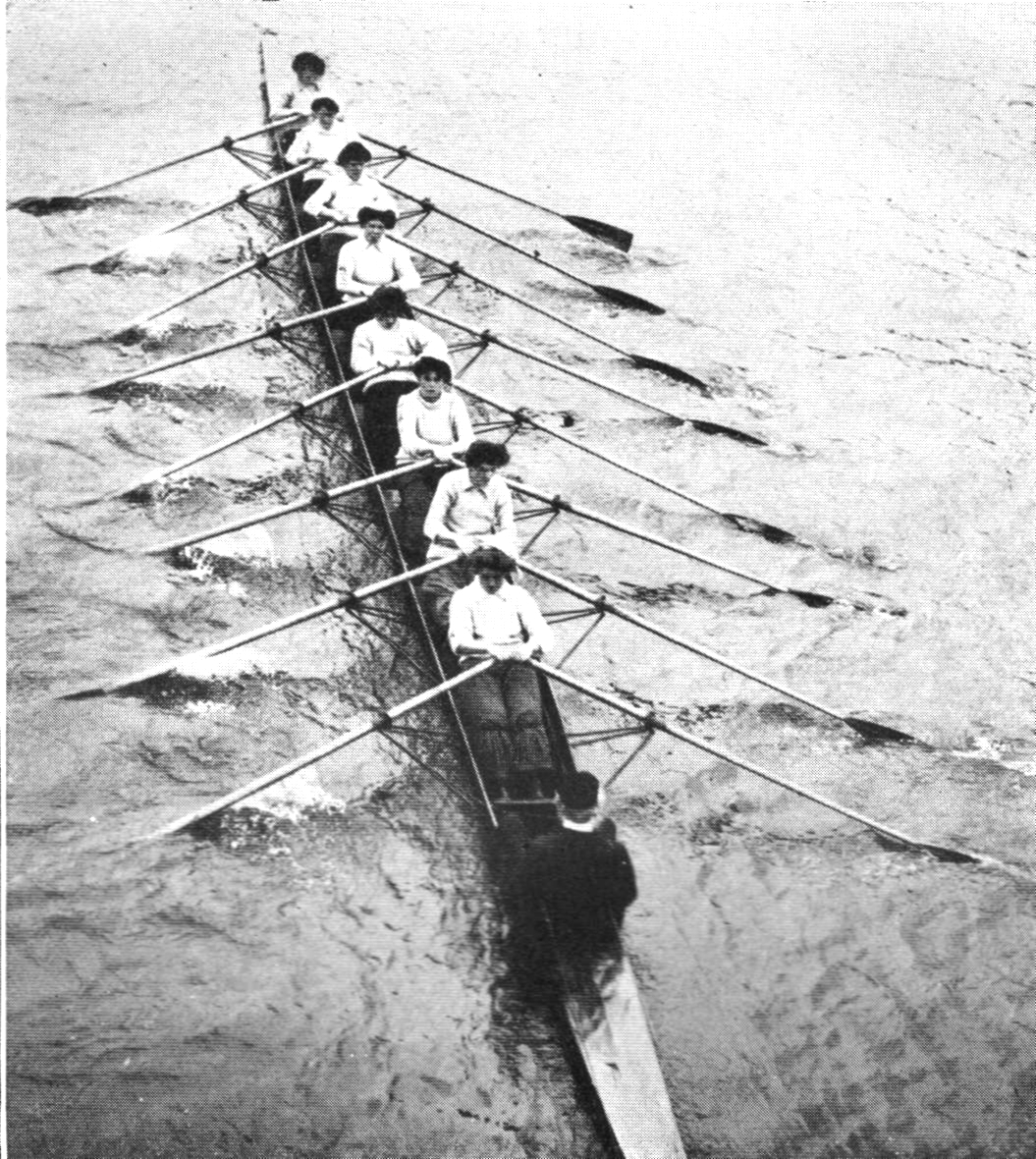
An octuple of Furnivall Sculling Club

Past Captains and Presidents of FSC
| Year(s) | President | Captain |
|---|---|---|
| 1896-98 | F. Furnivall | Polly Cloud |
| 1898-99 | F. Furnivall | Ada Guintini |
| 1899-1901 | F. Furnivall | Amy Porter |
| 1901-02 | F. Furnivall | Nancy Appleby |
| 1902-03 | F. Furnivall | Amy Porter |
| 1903-04 | F. Furnivall | Julia Sutton |
| 1904-05 | F. Furnivall | Emmie Sewell |
| 1905-06 | F. Furnivall | Lizzie Skinner |
| 1906-08 | F. Furnivall | Nellie Moulden |
| 1908-09 | F. Furnivall | Cissie Clements |
| 1909-10 | F. Furnivall | Alice Dewar |
| 1910-12 | unknown | Mabel Symonds |
| 1912-13 | Beatrice Harraden | Cissie Clements |
| 1913–14 | Beatrice Harraden | Annie Prettle |
| 1914-15 | J Dickson Brown | Mabel Symonds |
| 1915–16 | J Dickson Brown | Lizzie Meakins |
| 1916-17 | L A Magnus | Nellie Johnston |
| 1917-18 | L A Magnus | Norah Root |
| 1918 | L A Magnus | Betty Billson |
| 1918–19 | L A Magnus | Norah Root |
| 1919–20 | L A Magnus | Hilda Biesiegel |
| 1920-21 | unknown | Hilda Biesiegel |
| 1921-22 | J Dickson Brown | Maggie Hadley |
| 1922–24 | J Dickson Brown | Mabel Hart |
| 1924-25 | H S Webb | Miss F Sadler |
| 1925-26 | H S Webb | Louise Upton |
| 1926 | H S Webb | Miss B. Palin |
| 1926-27 | H S Webb | Nora Collins |
| 1927-28 | H S Webb | Violet Wadkin |
| 1928 | H S Webb | Claire Matthews |
| 1928-32 | H S Webb | Ethel Vokes |
| 1932-34 | H S Webb | Enid Chamberlen |
| 1934-36 | H S Webb | Joan Skinner |
| 1936-37 | H S Webb | Miss B Wymer |
| 1937-40 | H S Webb | Barbara Ball |
| 1940-46 | H S Webb | War period |
| 1946-52 | H S Webb | Tom Simmons |
| 1953-68 | W A Goff | |
| 1969-71 | T Simmons | |
| 1971-73 | A Simpson | |
| 1973-74 | F Sell | |
| 1974-78 | A Simpson | |
| 1978-80 | P Messias | |
| 1980-85 | J Robbins | |
| 1985-90 | B Moore | |
| 1990–92 | K Howland | Alasdair Stark |
| 1992–97 | K Howland | Derek Lowe |
| 1997–99 | K Howland | Jake Gresswell |
| 1999–00 | K Howland | Mark Somers |
| 2000–01 | K Howland | Jon Lord |
| 2001–04 | K Howland | Val Snewin |
| 2004–05 | K Howland | Steven Albrecht |
| 2005–06 | Mark Somers | Steven Albrecht |
| 2007–08 | Mark Somers | Henry Blythe |
| 2008–09 | Mark Somers | Steven Albrecht |
| 2010–11 | Mark Somers | Lisa Kallal |
| 2011–13 | Mark Somers | Sara Nanayakkara |
| 2013 | Henry Blythe | Sara Nanayakkara |
| 2013–16 | Henry Blythe | Michael de Paoli |
| 2016–22 | Henry Blythe | Christina Thorp |
| 2022–23 | Jonathan Stoddart | Evelyn Tichy & Joshua Morgan |
| 2023-26 | Jonathan Stoddart | Evelyn Tichy |
| 2026- | Jonathan Stoddart | Emily Farrer |

As of 2022, Furnivall has over 150 members, of whom about 120 are full, active members the balance being social, gym and honorary life members.

Furnivall underwent a major refurbishment in 2009 creating the club's ergometer facility, the John Robbins Room. A further set of works in 2019 and 20 modernised the building throughout. The club is one of four non-academic clubs (Note: The other such clubs are Sons of the Thames, Auriol Kensington Rowing Club (known as A.K.) and Fulham Reach Boat Club.) along the Hammersmith bend and in the Borough of Hammersmith and Fulham as a whole, excluding the very small, closed 'Nautilus Club' who are based at British Rowing Headquarters, Hammersmith and who use Great Britain-ressemblent blades. The clubs locally known as 'Furnivall', A.K. and 'Sons' form a cluster with a close rivalry and subtly different emphases on age, gender and abilities within their squads.

== Honours ==
=== British champions ===
| Year | Winning crew/s |
|---|---|
| 1984 | Women L1x |
| 1985 | Women L1x |
| 2003 | Men L2- |
| 2006 | Women 8+ |
| 2008 | Women 4+ |

== See also ==
- Rowing on the River Thames
- Frederick James Furnivall

== Notes and references ==
Notes
