= George Heriot's School Rowing Club =

Scottish rowing club

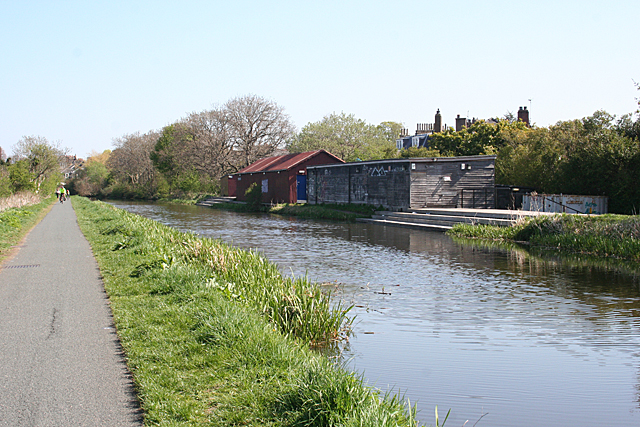

- George Heriot's boathouse is the red/brown gabled building.
- Motto: I Distribute Cheerfullie
- Location: Edinburgh, Scotland
- Home water: Union Canal, Edinburgh
- Founded: c.1953
- Colours: Navy Blue, White
- Affiliations: Scottish Rowing

George Heriot's School Rowing Club (GHSRC) is the rowing club within George Heriot's School, in the city of Edinburgh, Scotland. It competes regularly in Scottish Rowing regattas and Head of the River races. GHSRC also competes in many larger competitions on a national scale including Schools Head of the River and National Schools Regatta.

GHSRC is affiliated to Scottish Rowing.

== History ==
GHSRC shares a rivalry with George Watson’s College Boat Club.

The club has produced multiple British champions with the most recent being at the 2025 British Rowing Club Championships.

== Honours ==
=== British champions ===
Year	Winning crew/s
1988	Women J18 4+
1990	Women J16 8+
1991	Women J18 8+, Women J16 4+
1993	Men J14 2x, Men J16 4+
1996	Men J18 4+
1997	Women J18 8+
1998	Women J18 4+
2003	Women J18 4-, Women J16 4+
2005	Women J18 4+, Women J16 4+
2006	Women J18 4-, Women J18 4+
2007	Women J18 8+
2025	Women J16 4x-
2026	Women J18 4x-

== Notable members ==
- Polly Swann (born 1988), Olympic silver medalist in the women's eight

== See also ==
- Scottish Rowing
- British Rowing
