= Cambridge University Women's Boat Club =

British rowing club

- Location: Cambridge, United Kingdom
- Home water: River Cam and River Great Ouse
- Founded: 1941
- Key people: Larkin Sayre (President)
- Affiliations: British Rowing
- Website: cuwbc.org.uk

Events
- Women's Boat Race, Henley Boat Races

Notable members
- Annabel Vernon; Sarah Winckless; Alison Mowbray

Cambridge University Women's Boat Club (CUWBC) was the rowing club for women at the University of Cambridge. CUWBC fielded both a lightweight eight that races against Oxford at the Henley Boat Races, and two openweight eights that race at the Women's Boat Race. In April 2020 it was agreed that the club would be combined with the men's club CUBC and the lightweight men's club CULRC.

== History ==
=== Early days of the club ===
Women began rowing on the River Cam in the 19th century, mainly from Newnham College Boat Club, but only on a recreational level. Newnham competed against the Oxford University Women's Boat Club (OUWBC) from 1927 until 1939. For the first few "races", the two crews were not permitted to be on the river at the same time, and the winner was largely determined on style merit marks, rather than boat speed. The first side-by-side racing started in 1936.

The first blues were awarded in 1941, when CUWBC raced against OUWBC. All of the rowers in 1941 were members of Newnham. The following year, the first Girton rower competed.

In 1962, the CUWBC rowed in the men's bumps races, in the 8th division. CUWBC succeeded in bumping a men's crew only 7 times (in both the Lent and May Bumps) in the 12 years that they competed, often being bumped very quickly, and on one occasion getting triple-overbumped. CUWBC last competed in the bumps in 1973 – the following year, the first dedicated women's bumping races began.

=== Women's rowing ===
Until the foundation of the Cambridge University Combined Boat Club (CUCBC) in the mid-1990s, the CUWBC controlled the rules and races for all women's rowing. The CUWBC rules often differed from the rules for the men, which were governed by the Cambridge University Boat Club (CUBC). Eventually, as the number of women rowing increased to rival that of the men, the CUCBC was founded to bring all college rowing under the control of a single entity, leaving the CUWBC to concentrate on the Henley Boat Races.

=== Women's Boat Race on the Tideway ===
Through sponsorship from Newton Investment Management, the CUWBC Blue Boat race took place on the Tideway on the same day as the men's Boat Race for the first time in 2015.

== Honours ==
=== Henley Royal Regatta ===
| Year | Races won |
|---|---|
| 2018 | Princess Grace Challenge Cup |
| 2021 | Stonor Challenge Trophy |

=== British champions ===
| Year | Winning crew/s |
|---|---|
| 1980 | eights |
| 1984 | eights |
| 1986 | eights |
| 1990 | eights |
| 1991 | eights |
| 1993 | eights |
| 2003 | coxless fours |
| 2016 | coxless fours |
| 2018 | coxless fours |

== See also ==
- British Rowing
- University rowing (UK)
- Women's rowing
