= Tyne Rowing Club =

British rowing club

Tyne Amateur Rowing Club
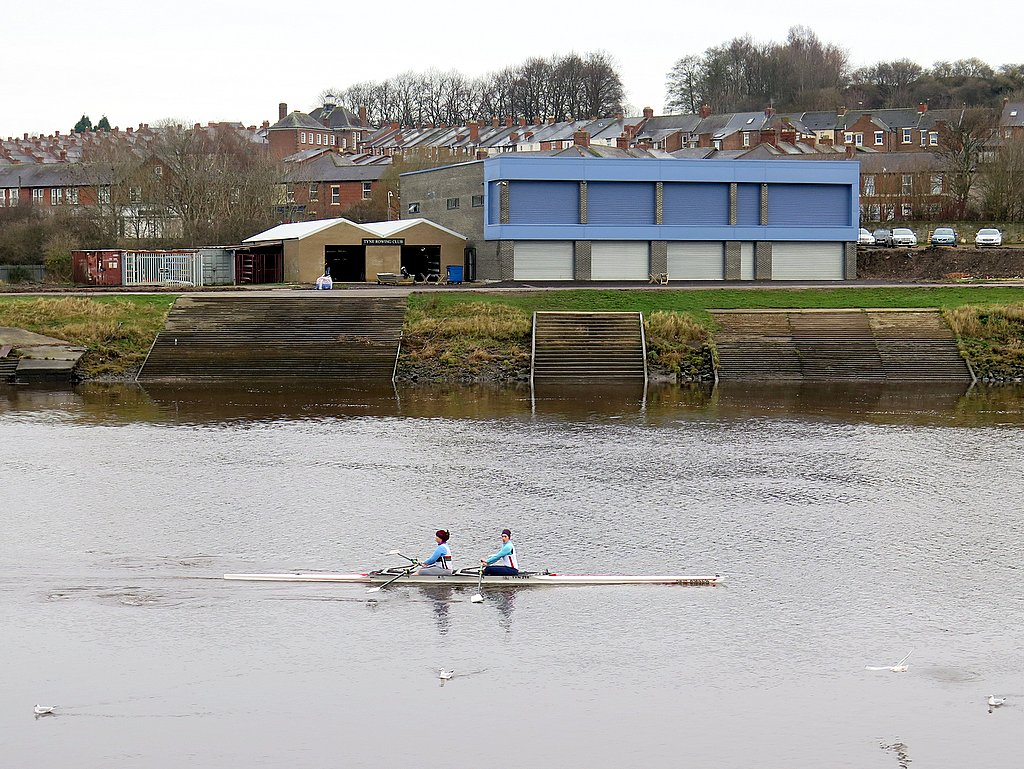

- Location: Water Row, Newburn, Newcastle upon Tyne, NE15 8NL, England
- Coordinates: 54.982073°N 1.744889°W
- Home water: River Tyne
- Founded: 1852
- Affiliations: British Rowing boat code - TYN
- Website: www.tynerowingclub.org

Events
- Tyne Head; Rutherford Head; Tyne Regatta

Tyne Amateur Rowing Club (TARC) is the longest established rowing club on the River Tyne in Newcastle upon Tyne, England. The club have active squads for men, women, masters, novices and juniors.

== History ==
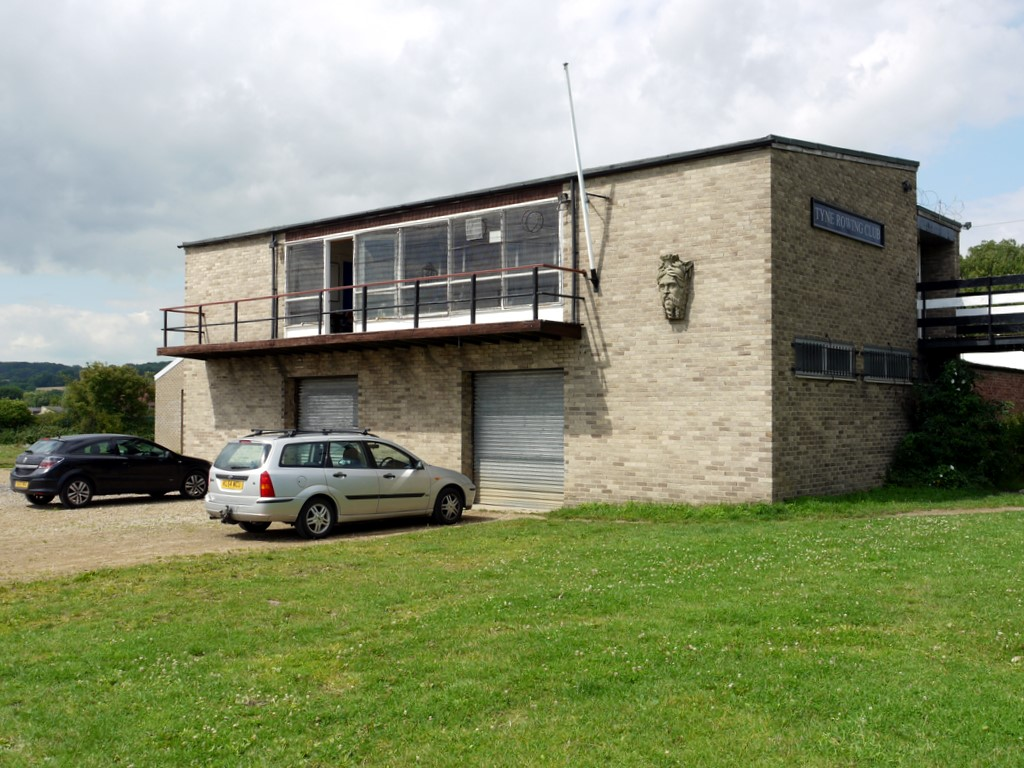
The old boathouse replaced in 2016

Founded in 1852 the club is affiliated to British Rowing and rows from their dedicated facility on the banks of the Tyne in Newburn Tyne and Wear.

In 2016, a new boathouse was built at the cost of £1 million. The construction was assisted by a bequest from former member John Dalkin and was opened by Jane Percy, Duchess of Northumberland.

Also in 2016, former club rower Will Fletcher represented Great Britain in the men's lightweight double sculls event at the 2016 Summer Olympic Games.

== Honours ==
=== Henley Royal Regatta ===
Year	Races won
1984	Stewards' Challenge Cup
2008	Wyfold Challenge Cup

=== British champions ===
Year	Winning crew/s
2006	Open J16 2-, Open J16 4-
2007	Open J18 2-, Open J18 4-
2008	Open L2x composite
2012	Open J14 1x
2014	Women J18 2-
2024	Women J18 4-
