= Star Club (rowing) =

British rowing club

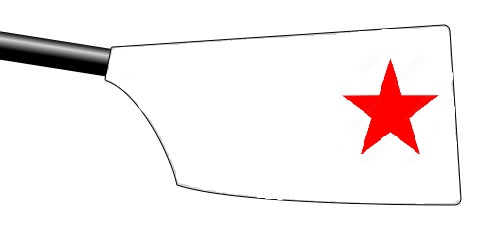
- Location: Poynter's Boathouse, Batt's Ford, Commercial Road, Bedford, Bedfordshire, England
- Coordinates: 52.134200°N 0.470875°W
- Founded: 1960
- Affiliations: British Rowing (boat code STA)
- Website: www.starclubrowing.co.uk

Star Club is a rowing club on the River Great Ouse, based at Poynter's Boathouse, Batt's Ford, Commercial Road, Bedford, Bedfordshire, England.

== History ==
The club was founded in 1960 by former members of RAF Cardington Rowing Club. The boathouse was originally 100 metres upstream from the current site. They soon became established and won the senior eights at the 1961 Peterborough City Rowing Club's annual regatta.

The club won the Jackson Trophy in 1962 at the Head of the River Race and has won the trophy in total six times. In 1972 the club merged with the Bedford Ladies Rowing Club. The club won the prestigious Grand Challenge Cup at the Henley Regatta with the Leander Club in 1991.

The club won the prestigious Britannia Challenge Cup at the Henley Regatta in 2012.

== Club colours ==
The blade colours are white with a red star.

== Honours ==
=== Henley Royal Regatta ===
| Year | Races won |
|---|---|
| 1986 | Britannia Challenge Cup (Bedford Star) |
| 1990 | Stewards' Challenge Cup (Star Club) |
| 1991 | Grand Challenge Cup (Star Club) |
| 2012 | Britannia Challenge Cup (Star Club) |

=== British champions ===
| Year | Winning crew/s |
|---|---|
| 1984 | Men J16 2- (Star Club) |
| 1986 | Men 8+ (Bedford Star) |
| 1987 | Men 2- (Bedford Star) |
| 1994 | Men J14 2x (Star Club) |
| 1995 | Men J16 2x, Men J14 1x (Star Club) |
| 1996 | Men J18 2x, Men J15 2x, Women J16 4x (Star Club) |
| 1997 | Men J18 2x, Men J16 2x (Star Club) |
| 1999 | Women 8+, Men J18 2x, Men J14 2x (Star Club) |
| 2000 | Women 2x (Star Club) |
| 2006 | Open J16 4+, Women J14 2x (Star Club) |
| 2009 | Women J16 4x (Star Club) |
| 2024 | Open club 8+ |

== Notable members ==
- Tim Foster
- Miriam Taylor
