= Prince Philip Challenge Cup =

- Venue: Henley Royal Regatta, River Thames
- Location: Henley-on-Thames, Oxfordshire
- Dates: 1963 – 2003

Prince Philip Challenge Cup was a rowing event for men's coxed fours at the annual Henley Royal Regatta on the River Thames at Henley-on-Thames in England.

The event ran from 1963 until 2003 but was withdrawn due to declining interest internationally.

== Past winners ==
Year	Winner	Runner-Up	ref
1963	Auckland Rowing Club, New Zealand	Thames Rowing Club	
1964	Molesey Boat Club	Phillips Exeter Academy, USA	
1965	Leander Club	Tideway Scullers School	
1966	SG Dynamo Potsdam, Germany	Kobenhavn Roklub, DEN	
1967	ASK Vorwarts, Rostock, USSR	Tideway Scullers School	
1968	Tideway Scullers School	row over	
1969	DSR Laga, Holland	Hutt Valley Rowing Club, NZL	
1970	R Konstanz/Wetzlar, FRG	SG Dynamo Potsdam, GDR	
1971	London Rowing Club & University of London	Leander Club	
1972	St. Catherine's Rowing Club, Canada	Oxford University Boat Club	
1973	Northeastern University Rowing Association, USA	Massachusetts Institute of Technology, USA	
1974	Lady Margaret & First & Third Trinity Boat Club	University of London	
1975	Univ of London	Vesper BC, USA	
1976	Thames Tradesmen's Rowing Club	Leander Club	
1977	Garda Siochana Boat Club, Ireland	Thames Tradesmen's Rowing Club	
1978	Trakia Club, Bulgaria	Quintin Boat Club & Marlow Rowing Club	
1979	Garda Siochana Boat Club, Ireland	University of London	
1980	Charles River Rowing Association, USA	Yale University	
1981	Kingston Rowing Club	Garda Siochana Boat Club, Ireland	
1982	University of London & Tyrian	Queensland University & Mosman RC, AUS	
1983	Kingston Rowing Club	University of London & Oxford University	
1984	Marlow Rowing Club & Tyrian	KSR Njord, NED	
1985	Tideway Scullers School	Thames Tradesmen's Rowing Club	
1986	AZS Szczecin & AZ Wroclaw, Poland	Thames Tradesmen's Rowing Club & Exeter RC	
1987	Soviet Army, USSR	AZS Szczecin & AZ Wroclaw, POL	
1988	Vancouver Rowing Club, Canada	Syracuse University, USA	
1989	University of London	Levski Spartak, BUL	
1990	Hansa Dortmund, Germany	Levski Spartak Club, BUL	
1991	Leander Club & Star Club	Dinamo Vilnius, USSR	
1992	Leander Club	Tideway Scullers School	
1993	Leander Club & Molesey Boat Club	Molesey Boat Club & University of London	
1994	Nottinghamshire County Rowing Association	Leander Club	
1995	Leander Club A	Leander Club B	
1996	Berliner Ruder Club, Germany	Potomac Boat Club & Arco Training Center, USA	
1997	Eton Vikings & Leander Club	Nottinghamshire County Rowing Association & Newcastle University	
1998	HVK “Gusar” Split, Croatia	EN d’Boulogne & Aviron Valentinois, FRA	
1999	Nottinghamshire County Rowing Association	Leander Club	
2000	Leander Club & Oxford Brookes University	Nottinghamshire County Rowing Association	
2001	Leander Club & Oxford Brookes University	Molesey Boat Club & Oxford University	
2002	Molesey Boat Club & Oxford Brookes University	Cambridge University	
2003	Leander Club	Molesey Boat Club & Tyrian	
