= Suzanne Kirk =

British rower

Personal information
- Nationality: British
- Born: 5 March 1969 (age 56); Nocton, England

Sport
- Sport: Rowing
- Club: Tideway Scullers School

Suzanne Kirk (born 5 March 1969) is a former British rower. She competed in the women's coxless four event at the 1992 Summer Olympics. She won the coxless pairs national title with Adrienne Grimsditch, rowing for the GB national team at the 1990 National Championships.
