= Rorie Henderson =

British rower

Personal information
- Full name: Rorie Graham Farquharson Henderson
- Nationality: British
- Born: December 1959

Sport
- Club: Lea RC; Bedford RC; Leander Club

Rorie Graham Farquharson Henderson (born 1959) is a former British rower who was a National champion and won the Diamond Challenge Sculls at the Henley Royal Regatta. and the Wingfield Sculls.

== Rowing career ==
Henderson was part of the double sculls crew, with Julian Scrivener that won the national title rowing for Lea Rowing Club, at the 1987 National Rowing Championships.

He was a member of the unplaced British quad scull at the 1989 World Rowing Championships. In 1990 he won the Wingfield Sculls. He competed at the World Championships in 1991 in the Double scull partnering Guy Pooley. In 1992 he won the Diamond Challenge Sculls at Henley Royal Regatta over Australian Paul Reedy after a hard-fought semi-final

== Personal life ==
Henderson joined Salmon Developments in 1993 and became acting managing director from 2001 to 2006 and a Director of the company.
