= 1984 British Rowing Championships =

- Venue: National Water Sports Centre
- Location: Holme Pierrepont (Nottingham)
- Dates: 14–15 July 1984

The 1984 National Rowing Championships was the 13th edition of the National Championships, held from 14–15 July 1984 at the National Water Sports Centre in Holme Pierrepont, Nottingham. The Championships were seriously affected by the fact that the Great Britain squad was in San Diego training for the 1984 Summer Olympics and the Junior squad was in Sweden for the World Championships.

== Senior ==
=== Medal summary ===
| Event | Gold | Silver | Bronze |
|---|---|---|---|
| Men 1x | Thames; Tony Ross | Kingston; Farrell Mossop | Tideway Scullers School; J Ferris |
| Men 2+ | Lea | Nottingham Britannia | |
| Men 2x | London | Maidenhead | Llandaff |
| Men 2- | Cambridge University / Molesey | | |
| Men 4- | Tyrian / London University | Molesey | London University |
| Men 4+ | Molesey | Tideway Scullers School | London University |
| Men 4x | Quintin | Evesham | Agecroft |
| Men 8+ | Leander | London University | Vesta |
| Whitbread Sprint | Vesta | Leander | Molesey |
| Women 1x | Reading; Mary Wilson | Birmingham; Rhian Davies | Kingston; Sandy Lutz |
| Women 2x | Birmingham / Pengwern | City of Cambridge | York City |
| Women 2- | Abingdon / Borough Road | Burway | Derby / Nottingham & Union |
| Women 4+ | London University | Clydesdale / Glasgow | Thames |
| Women 4x | Composite | | |
| Women 8+ | Cambridge University | London University | Lightweight Composite |

== Lightweight ==
=== Medal summary ===
| Event | Gold | Silver | Bronze |
|---|---|---|---|
| Men 1x | London | Lea | Kingston |
| Men 2x | London / Wallingford RC | Bewdley | Reading |
| Men 4- | NCRA A | Cambridge University / Imperial College / Leander | NCRA B |
| Men 8+ | Evesham Composite | Lea | Leander |
| Women 1x | Furnivall SC | | |
| Women 4- | Composite | | |

== Junior ==
=== Medal summary ===
| Event | Gold | Silver | Bronze |
|---|---|---|---|
| Men 1x | Liverpool Victoria | | |
| Men 2- | Clyde / Strathclyde University | | |
| Men 2x | Pangbourne College | | |
| Men 2+ | St George's College | | |
| Men 4- | Bedford RC/Pilgrim Sch/Star Club | | |
| Men 4+ | Cheltenham College | | |
| Men 4x | Pangbourne College | | |
| Men 8+ | St Paul's School | | |
| Men J16 1x | Hampton School | | |
| Men J16 2- | Star Club | | |
| Men J16 2x | Sir William Borlase / Worcester | | |
| Men J16 2+ | Cheltenham College | | |
| Men J16 4+ | Kingston Grammar School / King's College School | | |
| Men J16 4- | Radley College | | |
| Men J16 8+ | St Edward's | | |
| Men J14 4x | Kingston Grammar School | | |
| Women 1x | Glasgow | | |
| Women 2x | Rob Roy | | |
| Women 2- | Nottingham | | |
| Women 4x | Christchurch | | |
| Women 4+ | Queen Elizabeth HS | | |
| Women 8+ | Weybridge Ladies | | |

== Coastal ==
=== Medal summary ===
| Event | Gold | Silver | Bronze |
|---|---|---|---|
| Men 1x | Westover & Bournemouth | | |
| Men 2- | BTC (Southampton) | | |
| Men 4+ | Herne Bay | | |
| Women 4+ | Christchurch | | |

Key

| Symbol | meaning |
|---|---|
| 1, 2, 4, 8 | crew size |
| + | coxed |
| - | coxless |
| x | sculls |
| 14 | Under-14 |
| 15 | Under-15 |
| 16 | Under-16 |
| J | Junior |
