= Strathclyde Park Rowing Club =

Scottish rowing club

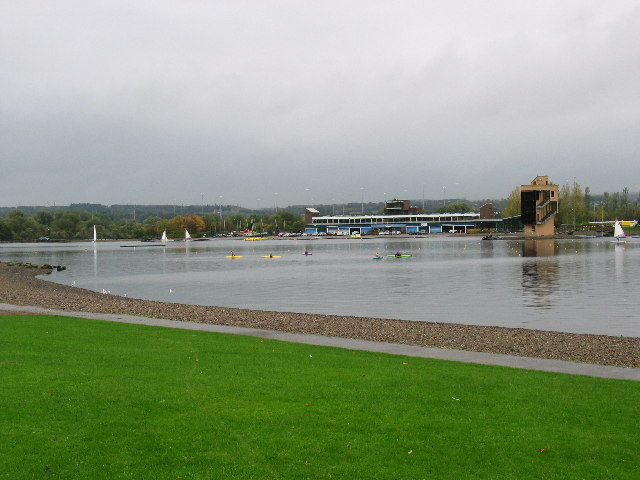

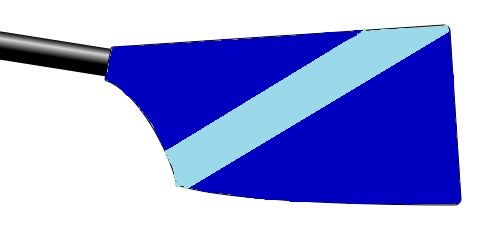
- Location: The Watersports Centre, Strathclyde Country Park, Scotland
- Home water: Strathclyde Loch
- Founded: 2000
- Membership: 50 - 60
- Affiliations: Scottish Rowing, Motherwell District Sports Council, Hamilton Sports Council
- Website: www.strathclydeparkrc.co.uk

Strathclyde Park Rowing Club (SPRC) is a rowing club which was founded in 2000 by Iain Somerside, Karen & Peter Barton and Tom Hewitt. It is the only 'open' club based at the international rowing course at Strathclyde Country Park, Motherwell, North Lanarkshire.

Development of the club has been greatly assisted by the Scottish Rowing Centre (SRC).

SPRC is affiliated to Scottish Rowing, the Scottish Governing Body of the sport, Hamilton Sports Council and Motherwell District Sports Council.

== Equipment and facilities ==
In addition to its fleet of 20 racing shells, the club's contract with the SRC allows club members the use of the Centre boats without direct charge.

When weather or light conditions do not permit boating, SPRC members have the choice of using the club’s 10 Concept 2 ergometers, the SRC rowing tank, the conditioning equipment in the Boathouse Fitness Gym, or running or cycling one of the many routes within Strathclyde Park or along the banks of the River Clyde.

The club has its own coaching launch and Park vessels are also available when required.

== Beginner Instruction ==
Since its inception SPRC has actively encouraged instruction of newcomers to the sport and beginner support is an integral part of the club ethos. Junior induction is carried out on an ad hoc basis with newcomers taken under a coach’s wing as they turn up. For adults a more formal approach is taken. Each year the club runs two Rowstart courses for which a charge is made – discounted from the first year’s subscription if the decision is taken to join.

In addition to the racing boats mentioned above, SPRC also has 2 ‘training’ singles for the use of beginners and access to the SRC's 'training' doubles.

The usual beginner progression is: rowing machine - rowing tank - training double - shell quad - double - single.

All beginners are required to attend and take part in a capsize drill and swim test at a local pool.

== Competitive Successes ==
Almost from the outset SPRC has tasted success at high-level competition, picking up medals at Scottish Championships, Scottish Indoor Championships, British Championships, Masters Head (London Tideway), GB-France Match, Coupe de la Jeunesse, Home International Regattas, Commonwealth Championships, Henley Masters and World Masters events.

The club has produced multiple British champions.

== Honours ==
=== British champions ===
| Year | Winning crew/s |
|---|---|
| 2005 | Women L2x, Open J18 2- |
| 2006 | Open J18 2-, Open J18 4- |
| 2007 | Women J16 4x |
| 2010 | Women L1x, Women L2- |
| 2024 | Women J15 4x+ |
| 2025 | Women J15 4x+ |
