= St George's College Boat Club =

British rowing club

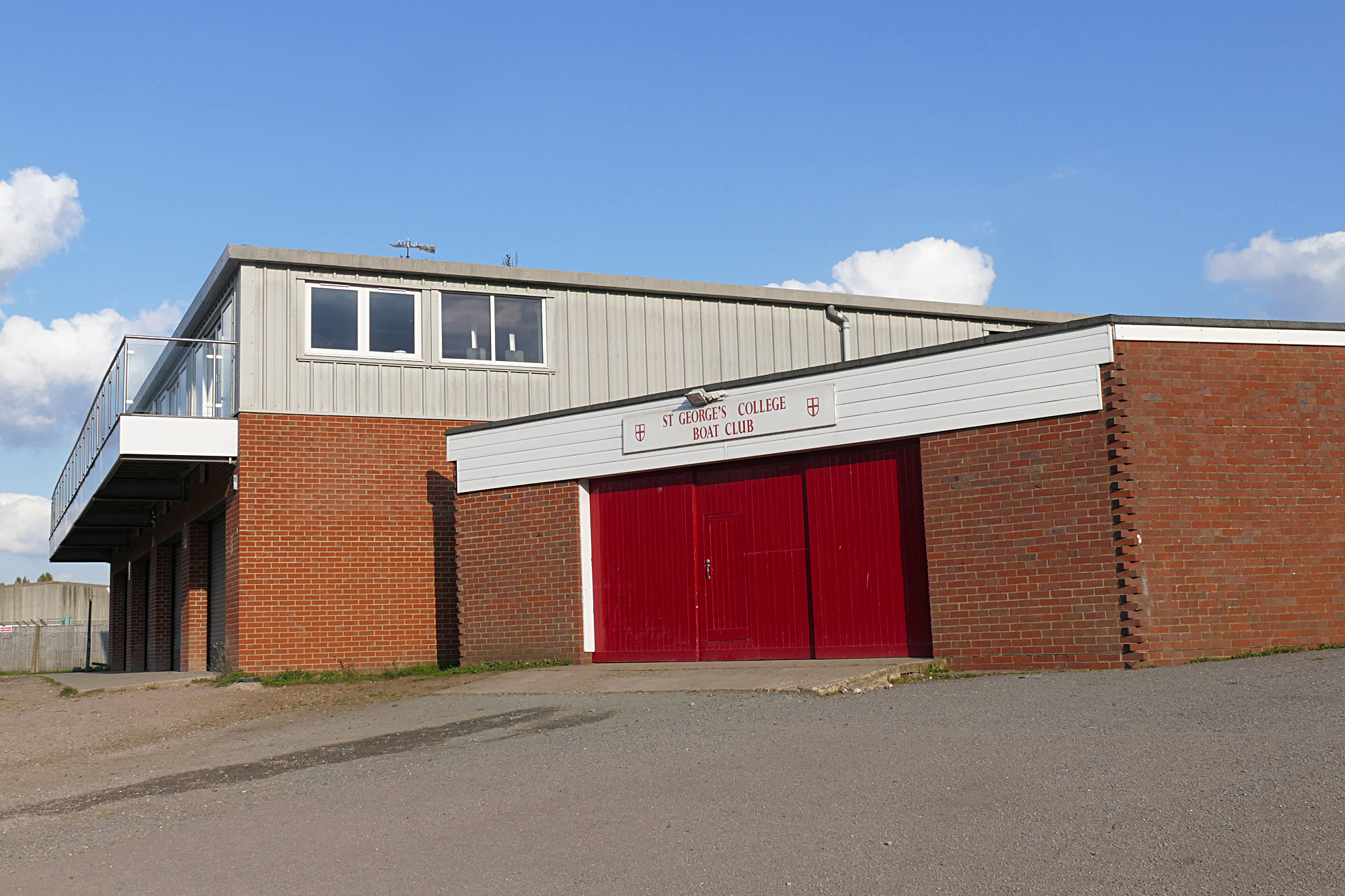

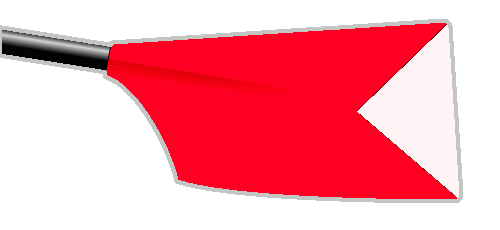
- Location: Sunbury Lane, Walton-on-Thames, Elmbridge, Surrey, England.
- Coordinates: 51.395249°N 0.417206°W
- Home water: River Thames
- Affiliations: British Rowing (boat code SGC)
- Website: www.stgeorgesweybridge.com/college/activities/sport

St George's College Boat Club is a rowing club on the River Thames, based at Sunbury Lane, Walton-on-Thames, Elmbridge, Surrey, England.

== History ==
The club belongs to the St George's College, Weybridge and the boathouse sits next to Walton Rowing Club.

The club has produced multiple British champions, with the most recent being at the 2025 British Rowing Club Championships.

== Honours ==
=== British champions ===
Year	Winning crew/s
1981	Men J16 2x
1984	Men J18 2+
1985	Men J16 2+, Men J16 4+
1986	Men J18 2x, Men J18 8+
1988	Men J15 4+, Men J14 1x
1990	Men J16 1x
1992	Men J18 2x
1993	Men J18 4x
1996	Men J16 2x
1998	Men J16 2x
2002	Men J16 4+
2009	Open J16 4-
2025	Open J18 4-

== See also ==
- Rowing on the River Thames
