= St Neots Rowing Club =

British rowing club

- Location: The Priory, Priory Lane, St Neots, Cambridgeshire, England
- Home water: River Great Ouse
- Founded: 1865; 161 years ago
- Affiliations: British Rowing boat code – SNE
- Website: Official website

Events
- St Neots Regatta, St Neots Small Boats Head

Notable members
- Laurie Evans, Bethany Astell, Philippa Neill, Jacqui Round, Jo Fitzsimons, Dominic Chapman, Max Taylor, Bryce Taylor, Joshua Dexter

St Neots Rowing Club (SNRC) is a rowing club in the town of St Neots, Cambridgeshire, England, situated on a 4 km (2.5 mi) section of the River Great Ouse. The club rows on a 4 km (2.5 mi) stretch of the River Great Ouse and races in eights, fours, quads, doubles, pairs and single sculls with a fleet of racing shells and several training boats and is affiliated to British Rowing.

== History ==
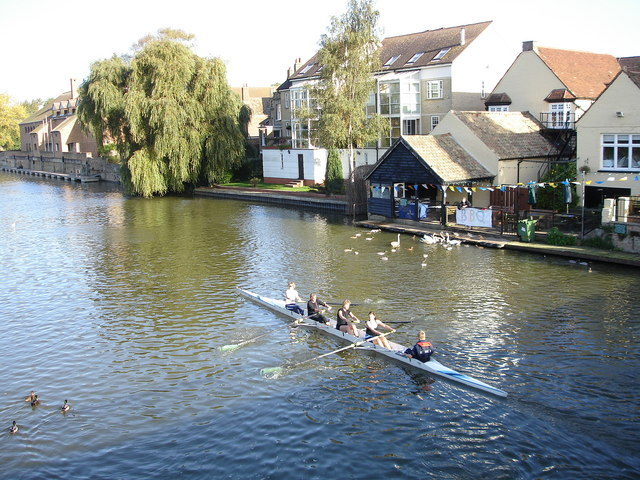
Rowing near St. Neots Town Bridge in 2006

Training for competitive rowing is believed to have started in St Neots in 1865 with the first recorded open regatta held on August Bank Holiday in 1874, continuing annually until 1882.

In 1949, the club planned to build a new boathouse following their most successful year to date.

The St Neots Rowing Club's boathouse was rebuilt after it was destroyed in 1976 (along with the club's fleet of boats) by gales.

St Neots Rowing Club has produced multiple champions at the British Rowing Championships and has provided a member of the Great Britain squad for the World Junior Championships ten times.

== Honours ==
=== British champions ===
Year	Winning crew/s
1980	Men 2+
1986	Women J14 2x
1987	Women J18 1x, Women J16 2x, Women J14 1x
1988	Men J14 2x, Women J16 1x, Women J16 2x
1989	Men J14 1x, Women J18 1x
2000	Women J15 1x
2001	Women J14 1x, Women J14 4x+
2003	Women J18 4x
2004	Women J18 4x, Women J14 1x
2005	Women 4-, Women J18 4x, Women J15 1x
2006	Open J14 1x, Women J16 2x, Women J14 2x
2007	Women J15 2x
2009	Women 4-, Women 8+

== See also ==
- British Rowing
