= Sons of the Thames =

Rowing club in London, England

Sons of the Thames Rowing Club

- Location: Hammersmith, London, England
- Coordinates: 51°29′25.4″N 0°14′19.6″W
- Home water: Tideway
- Founded: 1886
- Affiliations: British Rowing boat code - SON
- Website: www.sonsrowing.com

Sons of the Thames is a rowing club in Hammersmith, London, England. It was formed in Putney in 1886 with the aim, still enshrined in its constitution, to further the sport of rowing.

== History ==
Originally a tradesmen's club, thus open to those in manual work, that boated from Erith, the club by the date of its formal constitution had moved up river to Putney, boating from the Duke's Head, and then to Hammersmith. The latest move, since 2000, shares the 17th or 18th century listed building Linden House, on the promenade known as Upper Mall, with London Corinthian Sailing Club. The sailing club enjoys a 999-year lease. The club welcomes novices and offers a Learn to Row course each summer. More experienced members and graduates moving on from university boat clubs are also very welcome and will be integrated into the training squads for Henley and other regattas.

The club's official founding date is 1886, however there is evidence of crews racing under the "Sons of the Thames" name at least as far back as 1865. See also Joseph Sadler Crew Races.

=== Possible connections ===
In 1861, Herbert Playford created the Sons of the Thames Regatta, to bring forward new junior rowers. The race was held on the Thames between Putney and Hammersmith and had the distinction that the competitors must not use slides.

There are also mentions of a society called Sons of the Thames Society formed before 1790 to celebrate the annual Doggett's Coat and Badge sculling race.

== Results ==
=== Henley Royal Regatta ===
Sons of the Thames enjoyed success in the 1960s, winning twice at Henley.

- 1964, Wyfold Challenge Cup, AJ Sutton, R Carter, PJW Sharp, R Willis.
- 1968, Silver Goblets & Nickalls' Challenge Cup, AJ Sutton & PJW Sharp.

=== Henley Women's Regatta ===
Sons of the Thames have the following wins at Henley Women's Regatta:

- 1991, Championship Lightweight Pairs: Felicity Pike (bow) and Hilary Cook (stroke), coached by Ross Smitheman.
- 2010, Frank Harry Cup: James Renwick (cox), with Cat Hart, Emily Wright, Lyndsay Campbell and Pippa Blockley, setting a new course record.

=== British Championships ===
- 1985 British Rowing Championships, Women 2x, Women L2x (L Clark & B Crockford)
- 1986 British Rowing Championships, Women 2-

== Dewar Shield ==
Sons of the Thames, along with Auriol Kensington Rowing Club and Furnivall Sculling Club organise a yearly head race, the winners of which receive the Dewar Challenge Shield. The race covers half the Championship Course in the opposite direction, starting at Chiswick Bridge and finishing at Hammersmith Bridge.

The shield is named after Alice Dewar, a Furnival Captain in 1909. However, there are many other "Dewar Challenge Shields" that were presented by Sir Thomas Dewar dating from around the same time and which are very similar in design, so it's possible the origins of the shield may be different.

== See also ==
- Rowing on the River Thames
