= Burton Leander Rowing Club =

Rowing club in Staffordshire, England

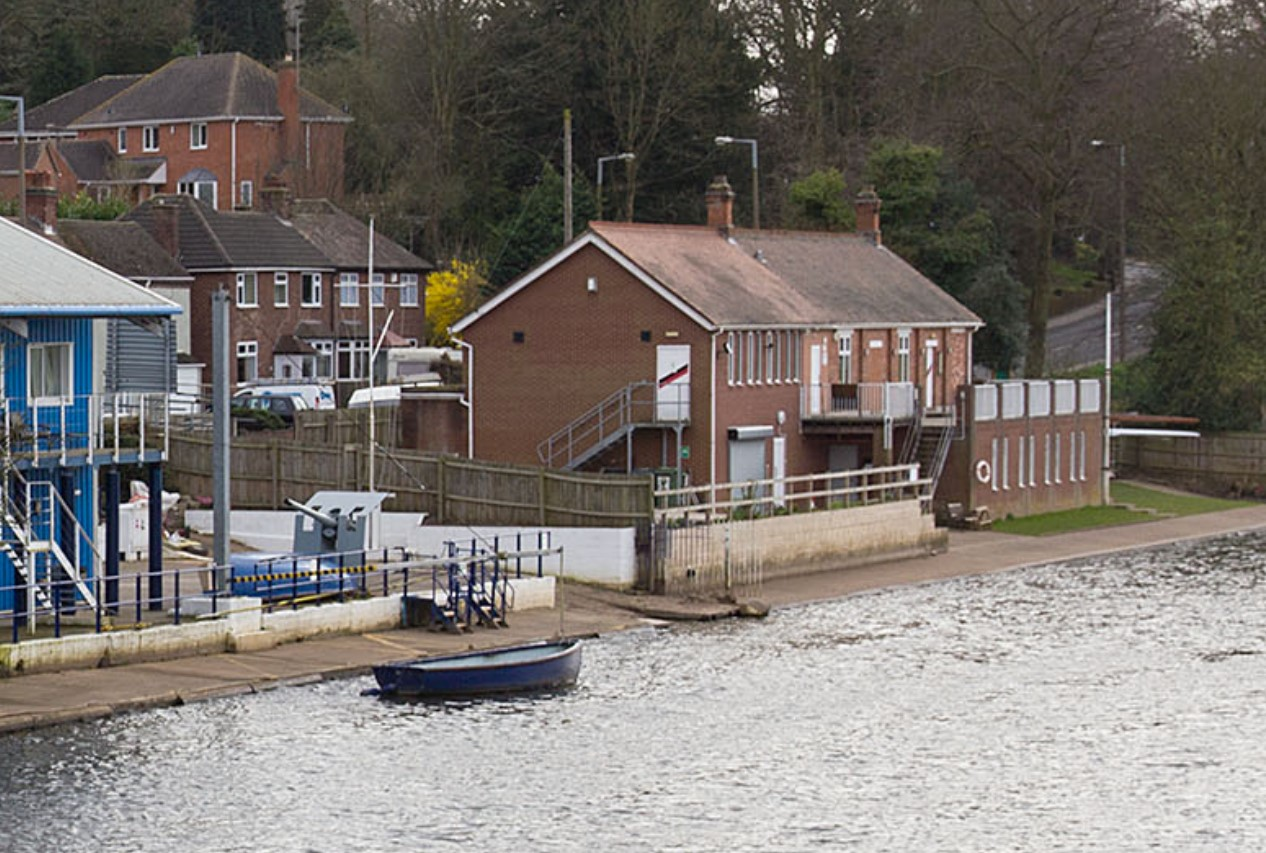

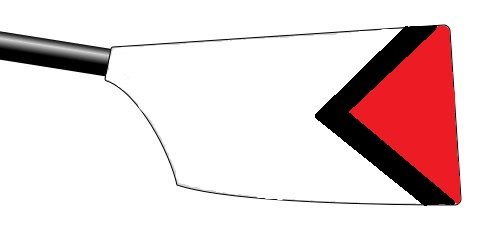
- Location: Stapenhill Road, Burton upon Trent, Staffordshire, England
- Coordinates: 52.804522°N 1.620344°W
- Founded: c.1848
- Affiliations: British Rowing (boat code BUL)
- Website: burtonleanderrowingclub.co.uk

Burton Leander Rowing Club is a rowing club on the River Trent, based at Stapenhill Road, Burton upon Trent, Staffordshire England. The blade and kit colours are white, scarlet and black. The club has open membership and runs teams for all age groups. The boathouse sits next door to rival club Trent Rowing Club.

== History ==
There is evidence that club existed as early as 1848, when the club competed in several events including the Burton-on-Trent Regatta. Rival club Burton Rowing Club was founded in 1865, the year they built their boathouse and not long after the Leander Club was referred to as the 'New Leander' for several years.

In September 1914, twenty members of the Burton RC and Burton Leander clubs volunteered for service with the London Rifle Brigade This led to suggestions to amalgamate the club due to decreasing members, which initially failed on 28 May 1915. After World War I, Burton RC struggled to recruit crews and eventually disbanded in 1920, which saw Burton Leander purchase their boathouse.

The club won the prestigious Wyfold Challenge Cup at the Henley Regatta in 1958. Many years later in 1993 they won the Fawley Challenge Cup as part of a composite team with the Walton Rowing Club.

== Honours ==
=== Henley Royal Regatta ===
Year	Winning crew
1958	Wyfold Challenge Cup
1993	Fawley Challenge Cup

=== British champions ===
Year	Winning crew/s
1985	Women J18 1x
1994	Men J18 2x
1999	Men J15 4x+
2006	Open U23 1x
