= Upper Thames Rowing Club =

British rowing club

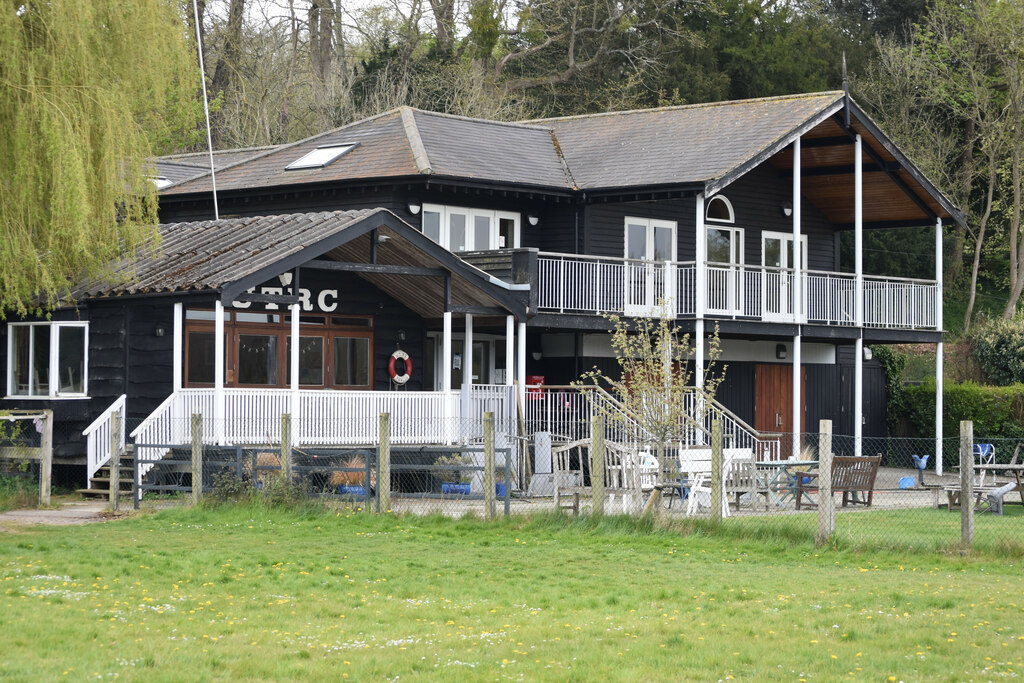

- Location: Henley-on-Thames
- Coordinates: 51.5457°N 0.895°W
- Home water: Hambledon Lock, River Thames
- Founded: 1963
- Affiliations: British Rowing boat code: UTC
- Website: www.utrc.org.uk

Events
- Henley Masters Regatta (July); Upper Thames Autumn Head (UTAH)

Upper Thames Rowing Club is an English rowing club. It has a large clubhouse at Remenham in Berkshire, on the River Thames near the town of Henley-on-Thames and is set back by its lawn frontage from the first half of the course of Henley Royal Regatta. The club was established in 1963.

== History ==
In 1964 the club entered its first crew for Henley Royal Regatta in the Thames Cup. The crew was composed of:

- Kevin O' Sullivan at bow (Eton Excelsior)
- Alan Smiter (also Eton Excelsior and the Club's first captain)
- Bill Rawson (Reading R.C.)
- Charles Hawtrey (a First and Third man from Cambridge)
- John Wingfield (Jesus College, Cambridge)
- David Neal (Henley R.C.)
- Hugh Cochrane (Reading R.C.)
- David Mayers stroke (Shrewsbury and Clare College, Cambridge)
- J Hooper (Marlow R.C.) as cox

One of the earliest crews to enter for the World Veteran Rowing Championships (the World Masters Regatta) was a coxless four from Upper Thames comprising Peter Sutherland, Sid Rand, Derek Thurgood and Glynne Davies in the early 1970s.

A number of renowned oarsmen have passed through the club membership, including many World and Olympic medalists. In 2014 two crews won the club's first trophies at Henley. They were:

The Wyfold Challenge Cup

- Ed Couldwell
- Michael Nagi
- Joe Perry
- Lewis Beech

The Britannia Challenge Cup

- Luke Wootton
- Graham Hall
- Sam Barnes
- Jake Davidson
- Scott Smith (cox).

== Honours ==
=== British champions ===
Year	Winning crew/s
1977	Women J18 4+
1983	Women 4x
1990	Men 4x
1991	Women J18 1x
1992	Men lightweight 2-
1994	Men 1x, Women lightweight 2-
1997	Women lightweight 4-
1998	Men 2+, Women 2-, Women 4-, Men L2-, Women L2x, Women L4-
1999	Women L4-
2000	Women 8+
2001	Men J16 4+
2002	Men 2+, Men L2-, Women L4x
2003	Women L2x, Men J16 2x
2004	Open J16 2x
2005	Women J18 2x
2007	Open L4x, Women U23 1x
2012	Open L1x, Women 4+

== Notable members ==
- Maj. -Gen. Roy Wood
- Guin Batten
- Miriam Batten
- Sir Steve Redgrave

== See also ==
- Rowing on the River Thames
