= Rachel Loveridge =

British rower

Personal information
- Born: 5 July 1980 (age 45)

Sport
- Country: United Kingdom
- Sport: Rowing
- Club: Thames Rowing Club
Medal record
Rowing
Representing United Kingdom
European Championships
Silver medal – second place	2008 Marathon	Women's eight

Rachel Loveridge (born 5 July 1980) is a retired British rower who participated in the women's eights in international level events.
