= Maidstone Invicta Rowing Club =

British rowing club

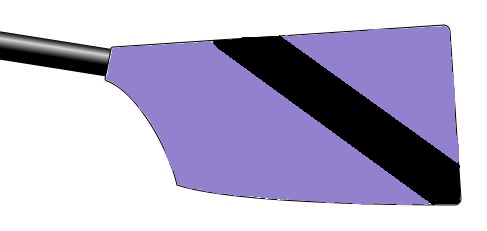
- Location: Maidstone Rowing Centre, James Whatman Way, Maidstone, Kent, England
- Coordinates: 51.278871°N 0.516784°E
- Founded: 1984
- Affiliations: British Rowing (boat code MAV)
- Website: maidstoneinvicta.co.uk

Maidstone Invicta Rowing Club is a rowing club on the River Medway, based at Maidstone Rowing Centre, James Whatman Way, Maidstone, Kent, England.

== History ==
The club was founded in 1984 and is affiliated to British Rowing. The club secured a 199-year lease from the Ministry of Defence on the site of the former Royal Engineers Rowing Club.

The club has produced multiple champions.

== Honours ==
=== British champions ===
Year	Winning crew/s
1993	Men J14 1x
1994	Men J15 1x
2003	Women J14 2x
2007	Open J16 2-, Open J14 2x
2008	Open J16 4+, Open J15 2x
2009	Open J18 2-, Open J18 4-
2011	Open J18 4-
2025	Mens H 1x
