= Sheffield University Rowing Club =

British rowing club

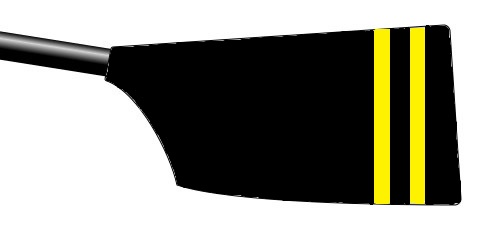
- Location: Lower Bradfield, Sheffield, England
- Coordinates: 53°24′53.4″N 1°34′55.0″W
- Home water: Damflask Reservoir, Sheffield, England
- Founded: 1964
- University: The University of Sheffield
- Affiliations: British Rowing boat code - SHU
- Website: www.sheffielduniversityrowingclub.co.uk

Sheffield University Rowing Club (SURC) is the rowing club for The University of Sheffield and is based on Damflask Reservoir near Lower Bradfield, Sheffield, England, and is affiliated to British Rowing. Based at Damflask Reservoir, within the Peak District, the boathouse used by the club is shared with Sheffield Hallam University RC. The club relies on donations from alumni, competitions and annual membership to care for the upkeep of their boats and equipment.

== History ==
The club was founded in 1964 by a small group of students from Sheffield University and experienced success the following year reaching a final of the Northwich Regatta.

In 2019, the Women's squad qualified for the Henley Women's Regatta. In 2025, the Men's squad qualified for the Temple Challenge Cup at Henley Royal Regatta.

== Sheffield Varsity ==
The Sheffield Varsity has run since 1997. During that time, Sheffield University RC has never lost the Varsity competition against their Sheffield rivals Sheffield Hallam University RC.

== See also ==
- University rowing (UK)
