= Mortlake Anglian & Alpha Boat Club =

British rowing club

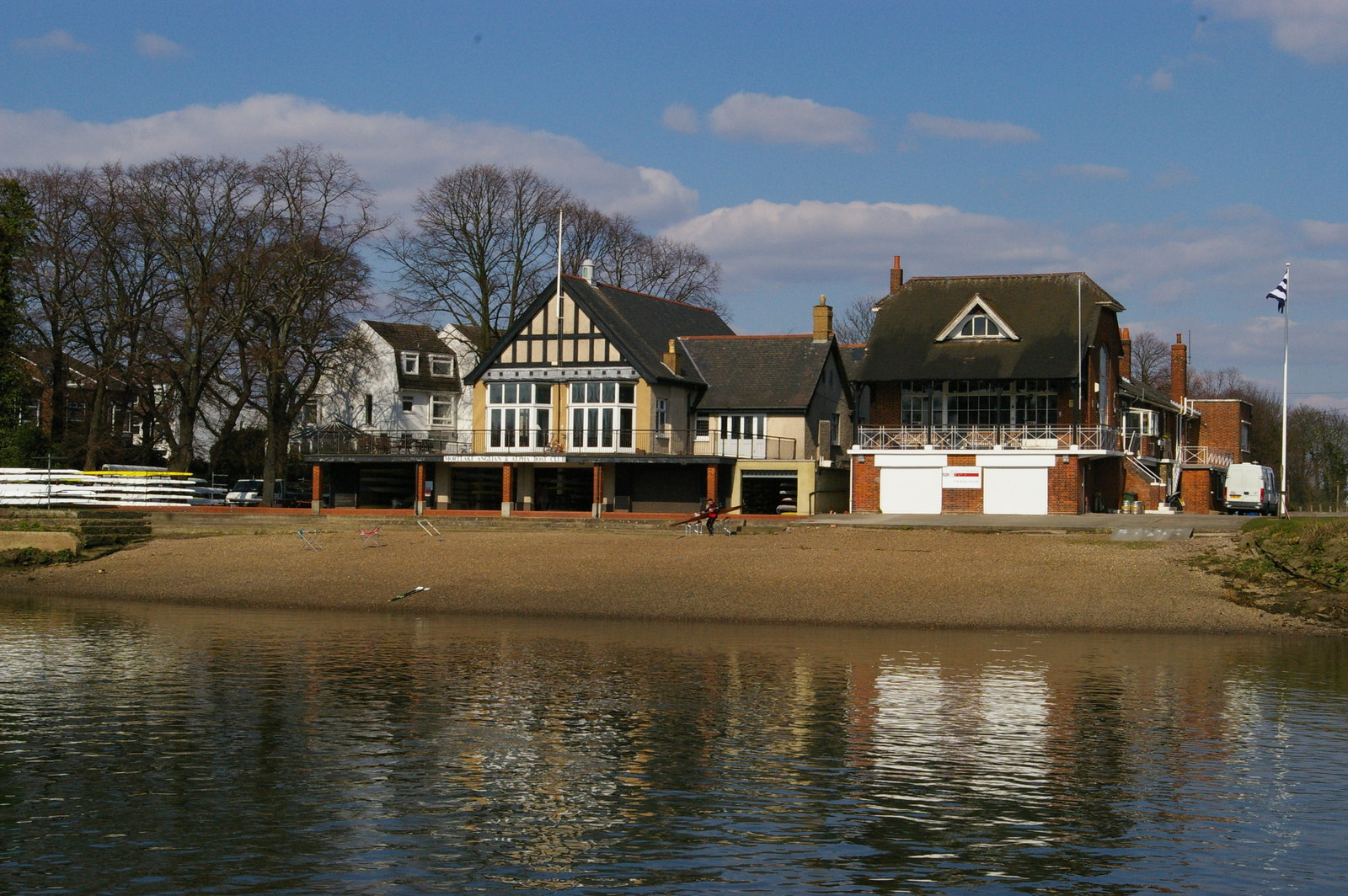

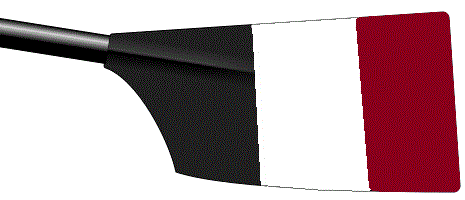
- Location: The Boathouse, Ibis Lane, Off Hartington Road, Chiswick, London
- Coordinates: 51.475184°N 0.270649°W
- Founded: 1984
- Affiliations: British Rowing boat code - MAA
- Website: www.maabc.com

Hosting the Boat Race 2026. The boats are the umpire's launch Amaryllis and the RNLI lifeboat Hurley Burly.

Mortlake Anglian & Alpha Boat Club (MAABC) is a rowing club based on the River Thames, close to Chiswick Bridge in Chiswick, West London and has produced multiple national champions.

== Location ==
The MAABC boathouse is situated next door to the Quintin Boat Club, which is part of the University of Westminster Boathouse and is undergoing refurbishment, which will be finished in 2022.

== History ==
Although established in 1984, it has much older roots, which feature a series of mergers from eight clubs. In 1877, the Mortlake Rowing Club was founded, and the following year, the Anglian Boat Club was founded; these two clubs merged in 1962 to form the Mortlake Anglian Boat Club.

Two clubs called the Bedford Park Rowing Club and the Barnes Bridge & District Rowing Club merged to form the Chiswick Rowing Club, and they later merged with the 1962 Mortlake Anglian Boat Club, becoming the Mortlake Anglian & Chiswick Boat Club. Finally, in 1984, the Alpha Women's Boat Club (formed in 1927) merged with the Mortlake Anglian & Chiswick Boat Club to become the Mortlake Anglian & Alpha Boat Club.

== Honours ==
=== British champions ===
Year	Winning crew
1991	Women 1x, Women L1x
1994	Women 1x, Women L1x
2000	Women L2x
2004	Women L1x
2005	Women 2-
2006	Women 2x, Women 4x, Women U23 2x
2007	W4x, WL1x, WL2x, WL2-, WL4-
2008	WL2x, WL2-, WL4x, WL4-
2009	WL2x, WL2-, WL4x
2010	W2x, WL2x, WL4x, WL4-
2011	W1x, WL2x, WL4x, WL4-
2012	WL2-

== See also ==
- Rowing on the River Thames
