= Tideway Scullers School =

British rowing club

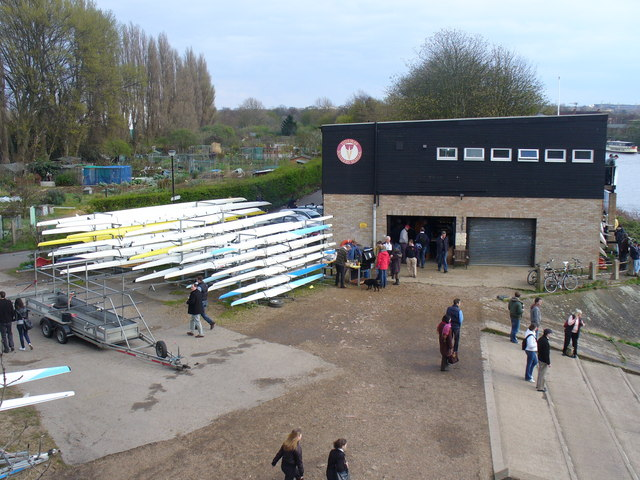

- Location: Chiswick, England
- Coordinates: 51°28′24″N 0°16′6″W
- Home water: Tideway
- Founded: c.1957
- Affiliations: British Rowing boat code - TSS
- Website: www.tidewayscullersschool.co.uk

Distinctions
- Current champions at HOR4s

Tideway Scullers School is a rowing club on the Tideway of the River Thames next to Chiswick Bridge in Chiswick, London.

The club previously held the headship for the Head of the River Race (2009), the largest UK eights event, and the senior men's squad holds the record for the Head of the River Fours course.

== History ==
Alec Hodges was a founder member and an organiser of Tideway Scullers School in approximately 1957, filling all offices of the club at one time or another over the years. He was the driving force behind getting the TSS boathouse built in 1984, along with Lou Barry and Cyril Bishop.

Hodges was among early coaches to have coached the school's (club's) crews to wins at Henley and he took new scullers, from the youngest to the oldest, under his wing, sorting out or lending them boats so they could enjoy the sport he loved. Even when well in his seventies he would take three or four scullers out, one after another, setting them on the road to sculling. He organised sculling courses every year, twisting the arms of many people to help, and these courses were the start of many successful sculling careers, including world champion Debbie Flood.

The club is believed to be the only non-academic related club named 'School' for sculling, which is the propelling of boats with starboard and port oars for each oarsman or oarswoman. Rowing has also been conducted from the site directly east of Chiswick Bridge from the outset.

== Notable members ==
- Saskia Budgett
- Alan Campbell
- Mahé Drysdale

== Honours ==
=== British champions ===
Year	Winning crew/s
1972	Victor Ludorum, M 2+, M 2x. M 4+, M 8+
1973	M 4+
1974	Lwt M 4-, JMen 1x
1976	M 4x
1982	W 2-
1983	M 2x, W 2-
1985	M 4+
1986	Lwt M 1x,
1987	M Victor Ludorum, M 2x, M 4x, W 2x,
1988	M 2x, M 8+, W 4-, Lwt M 1x
1989	M 2x, W 1x, Lwt W 1x
1990	W 4x
1991	M 4x, W 4x, Lwt W 2x, JM 1x
1992	W 4x, U23 M 1x
1993	M 4x, W 2-
1994	M 4x, W 2x, W 4x, Lwt M 4x
1995	M 4x, W 2x, W 8+, Lwt W 2x
1996	W 2x, W 4x. Lwt M 1x, JW 1x
1997	M 2x, W 4-, Ltw M 2x, W U23 1x
1998	W 2x, W 4X, Ltw M 2x, JW 1x
1999	W 8+, Ltw M 1x, MJ14 1x
2000	M 2-, M 4x, W 1x, M 8+, Lwt W 2-, M J15 1x
2001	M 4x, Lwt M 2x, Lwt W 2-, M J16 1x, W J15 4x+
2002	Lwt M 1x, Lwt M 2x, Lwt W 4x, M J15 1x
2003	W 4+, Lwt M 2x, Lwt M 4x, M J14 2x
2004	O J15 2x
2005	O 2x, Lwt O 1x, Lwt O 4x, O J18 1x, O J14 1x, O J14 2x
2006	O 2-, O 4x, Lwt O 4x, O J14 2x, O J14 4x+
2007	O 2x, O 4x, W 4x, Lwt W 4x, O J14 4x+,
2008	Lwt O 4x, Lwt W 1x, O J15 4x+
2009	W J18 1x
2010	W 8+, O J18 1x, O J18 2x, O J16 1x, O J16 2x, O J15 4x+
2011	Lwt O 4x, O J18 1x, W J14 2x
2012	Open J18 1x, Open J15 1x, Open J15 2x
2013	Open J16 4x
2014	Open J18 2-, Open J15 1x, Women J16 1x
2016	Open J16 2-, Open J15 4x+
2017	Open J18 1x, Open J18 2-
2018	Open J15 4x+
2019	Open J16 4x, Women J15 1x
2025	Open J15 1x

=== Henley Royal Regatta ===
Year	Races won
1964	Stewards' Challenge Cup
1967	Wyfold Challenge Cup
1968	Double Sculls Challenge Cup, Prince Philip Challenge Cup
1971	Grand Challenge Cup, Silver Goblets & Nickalls' Challenge Cup
1976	Britannia Challenge Cup
1977	Britannia Challenge Cup
1984	Britannia Challenge Cup
1985	Prince Philip Challenge Cup
1986	Queen Mother Challenge Cup
1988	Double Sculls Challenge Cup, Thames Challenge Cup
1991	Queen Mother Challenge Cup
1993	Queen Mother Challenge Cup
2000	Princess Royal Challenge Cup
2003	Diamond Challenge Sculls
2004	Fawley Challenge Cup
2007	Diamond Challenge Sculls
2010	Britannia Challenge Cup
2011	Diamond Challenge Sculls
2021	Fawley Challenge Cup
2023	Diamond Jubilee Challenge Cup

=== Henley Women's Regatta ===
Year	Races won
1989	O 4+, Lwt 1x
1992	O 4-
1993	O 4x, O 2x
1995	O 4x, O 2x
1996	O 4+, Lwt 4-
1997	Club 4+
2000	Lwt 2-
2003	O 4x
2010	Nina Padwick Trophy
2016	Invesco Perpetual Trophy
2017	Chairman's Trophy
2018	AC 8+
2019	AC 4-, D 4+, J 4x, C Lwt 2-
2021	Copas Cup, Lester Trophy, Chairman’s Trophy, Di Ellis Trophy

=== Head of the River Race ===
Year	Winning crew/s
1964	Vernon Trophy
1965	Vernon Trophy
1966	Vernon Trophy
1967	Vernon Trophy
1968	Vernon Trophy
1969	Vernon Trophy
1970	Vernon Trophy
1971	Vernon Trophy
1972	Vernon Trophy
1973	Vernon Trophy
1974	Vernon Trophy
1975	Vernon Trophy
1976	Vernon Trophy, Veteran A Pennant
1977	Veteran A Pennant
1987	Vernon Trophy
1988	Senior 1 Pennant
2002	Novice Pennant
2008	Vernon Trophy, Senior 1 Pennant

=== Fours Head ===
Year	Winning crew/s
1966	Coxed Best Boat
1967	Coxed Best Boat
1968	Coxed Best Boat
1969	Coxed Best Boat
1970	Shell
1978	Coxed Four
1980	Coxed Four
1985	Women Coxed Four
1988	Women Coxed Four
1990	Coxed Four, Women Four
1993	Open Quad
1998	4x
2002	WS2+
2005	Junior 4x
2006	Elite 4x
2007	Elite 4x
2008	Elite 4x, Women Elite 4x
2010	IM1 4-
2011	Senior 4-
2012	Senior 4-
2013	Elite 4x, W IM2 4+
2014	IM1 4+, W IM2 4+
2015	Senior 4-, IM1 4+
2016	W IM1 4-, W Sen 4-, W IM2 4+, W IM1 4+

=== Women's Eights Head of the River Race ===
Year	Winning crew/s
1992	
1993	Senior 1
1996	2
1999	Senior 1
2000	Senior 2
2003	Senior
2005	V
2007	Head
2009	Club
2014	Masters
2016	Masters
2017	Intermediate
2022	3rd, Senior, Club
2025	Junior

== See also ==
- Rowing on the River Thames
