= Castle Semple Rowing Club =

Scottish rowing club

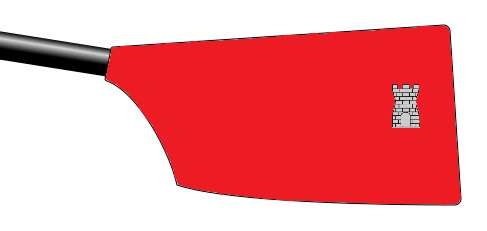
- Location: Lochwinnoch, Renfrewshire, Central Lowlands, Scotland
- Coordinates: 55.797658°N 4.619434°W
- Affiliations: Scottish Rowing
- Website: www.castlesemplerc.co.uk

Castle Semple Rowing Club is a rowing club on the Castle Semple Loch, based at Lochwinnoch, Renfrewshire, Central Lowlands, Scotland. The club is affiliated to Scottish Rowing.

== History ==
In 1986 club members James Sloan and Martin Holmes represented Scotland at the 1986 Commonwealth Games in the lightweight single sculls and the coxless fours and eights respectively.

The club won the Queen's Award for Voluntary Service in 2015.

The club has produced multiple British champions.

== Honours ==
=== British champions ===
Year	Winning crew/s
1988	Men J18 1x
1989	Men 8+
1998	Men 2x
1999	Men 8+
2005	Open J18 2-
2006	Open J18 2-, Open J18 4-
2007	Open J15 2x
2012	Women J18 2-
