= Guin Batten =

British rower

Medal record

Women's rowing

Representing Great Britain

Olympic Games
Silver medal – second place	2000 Sydney	Quadruple sculls

Guin Batten (born 27 September 1967) is a British rower. She won silver at the 2000 Summer Olympics in the quadruple scull with her elder sister Miriam Batten, Gillian Lindsay and Katherine Grainger.

Guin was a member of the Southampton University Boat Club whilst she studied at the University of Southampton.

In 2003, she set the record for the fastest solo crossing of the English Channel in a rowing shell (Olympic Class) and became the first solo female crossing, in a time of 3 hours and 14 minutes. This was eight minutes faster than the men's record set by her friend Bob Gullett on the same trip.

On 3 June 2012, Guin was amongst the rowers (with her sister) on the Gloriana (barge) with the Olympic Torch at the start of the Thames Diamond Jubilee Pageant.

She is a member of Thames Rowing Club, Upper Thames Rowing Club and Leander Club, a Steward of Henley Royal Regatta and a trustee of the River & Rowing Museum.
