= Clyde Amateur Rowing Club =

British rowing club

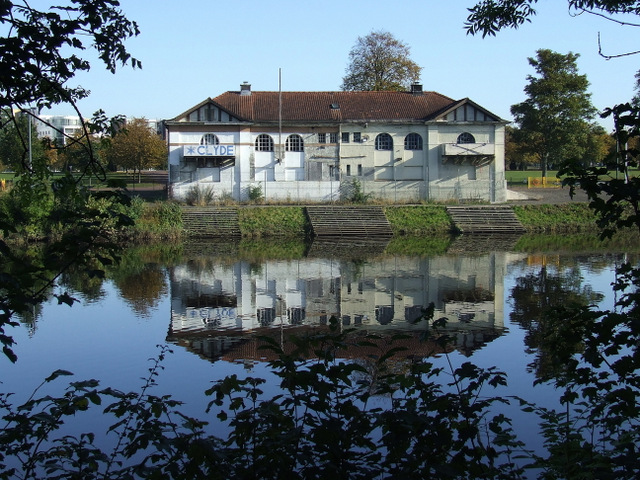

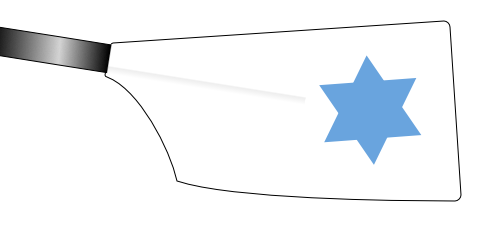
- Location: West boathouse, Glasgow Green, Glasgow, Scotland
- Coordinates: 55.851823°N 4.243802°W
- Founded: 1865
- Affiliations: Scottish Rowing
- Website: clydearc.org.uk

Clyde Amateur Rowing Club is a rowing club on the River Clyde, based at the West Boathouse, Glasgow Green, Glasgow, Scotland. The club is affiliated to Scottish Rowing.

== History ==
The club was founded in 1865 and is on the west side of a shared boathouse with the Clydesdale Amateur Rowing Club. The Penny Brothers (Thomas, Laurence, Alexander, William and James Penny) were all members of Clyde ARC during the 1920s and 1930s.

== Notable Members ==
Former alumni include:

- Polly Swann
- Imogen Walsh

== Honours ==
=== British champions ===
Year	Winning crew/s
1984	Men J18 2-
1986	Women J16 2-
1987	Women 4x, Women J18 2-
1993	Women L2x
1998	Men L4-
2003	Women L4x
2009	Women L1x
