= Wallingford Rowing Club =

British rowing club

- Emblem: light blue portcullis with crossed blades below.
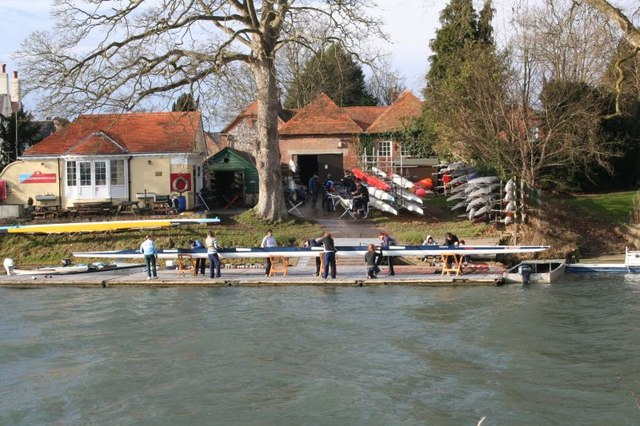

- Location: Wallingford, Oxfordshire, England
- Coordinates: 51.5985°N 1.1224°W
- Home water: Wallingford & Moulsford Reach (reach above Cleeve Lock)
- Founded: 1947
- Affiliations: British Rowing boat code - WRC
- Website: wallingfordrc.co.uk

Events
- Wallingford Regatta (April/May); Wallingford Long Distance Sculls (September/October); Wallingford Head of the River (November/December)

Distinctions
- Shares with Oxford Brookes and Oxford University the longest stretch between locks on the Thames.

Wallingford Rowing Club is a rowing club on the River Thames by Thames Street, Wallingford, Oxfordshire.

== History ==
The club was formed in 1947 by the Wallingford Regatta committee. The club’s blade colours are scarlet with a light blue tip and a scarlet with sides trimmed light blue kit. In December 2013 the club opened a new gym facility.

The club produced five national title winning crews at the 2025 British Rowing Club Championships, which was a record haul for the club.

== Honours ==
=== British champions ===
Year	Winning crew
1972	Men J18 2+
1974	M2+, M2-c, M4xc
1975	W1x, W4x
1980	ML4-
1982	ML2x
1983	ML2x
1984	ML2x
1986	Men J14 1x
1987	W4+
1989	Men J16 4x, Women J16 2x
1993	Men J16 2x
1994	Men J18 4x
1995	Women J14 1x
1998	Women L1x
1998	WL1x
2000	WL1x
2001	W1x
2002	W1x, W2x, W8+c
2004	WL2x
2011	Women J15 1x
2016	W2x
2021	Open J18 1x
2023	WJ16 4+
2024	WJ18 8+, WJ16 4x-
2025	Wclub 4-, OJ16 2-, OJ16 4+, WJ18 4x, WJ16 4+

Key - M men, W women, + coxed, - coxless, x sculls, c composite, L lightweight

=== Henley Royal Regatta ===
Year	Races won
1972	Britannia Challenge Cup
1979	Wyfold Challenge Cup
1995	Britannia Challenge Cup
2008	Remenham Challenge Cup
2009	Remenham Challenge Cup, Princess Grace Challenge Cup
2024	Prince Philip Challenge Trophy

== Notable members ==
- Diana Bishop
- Elizabeth Butler-Stoney
- Colin Cusack
- Michael Drury
- Katie Greves
- Zaza Horne
- Eleanor Piggott
- Carl Purchase
- Brianna Stubbs
- James Wright

== See also ==
- Rowing on the River Thames
