= Peterborough City Rowing Club =

British rowing club

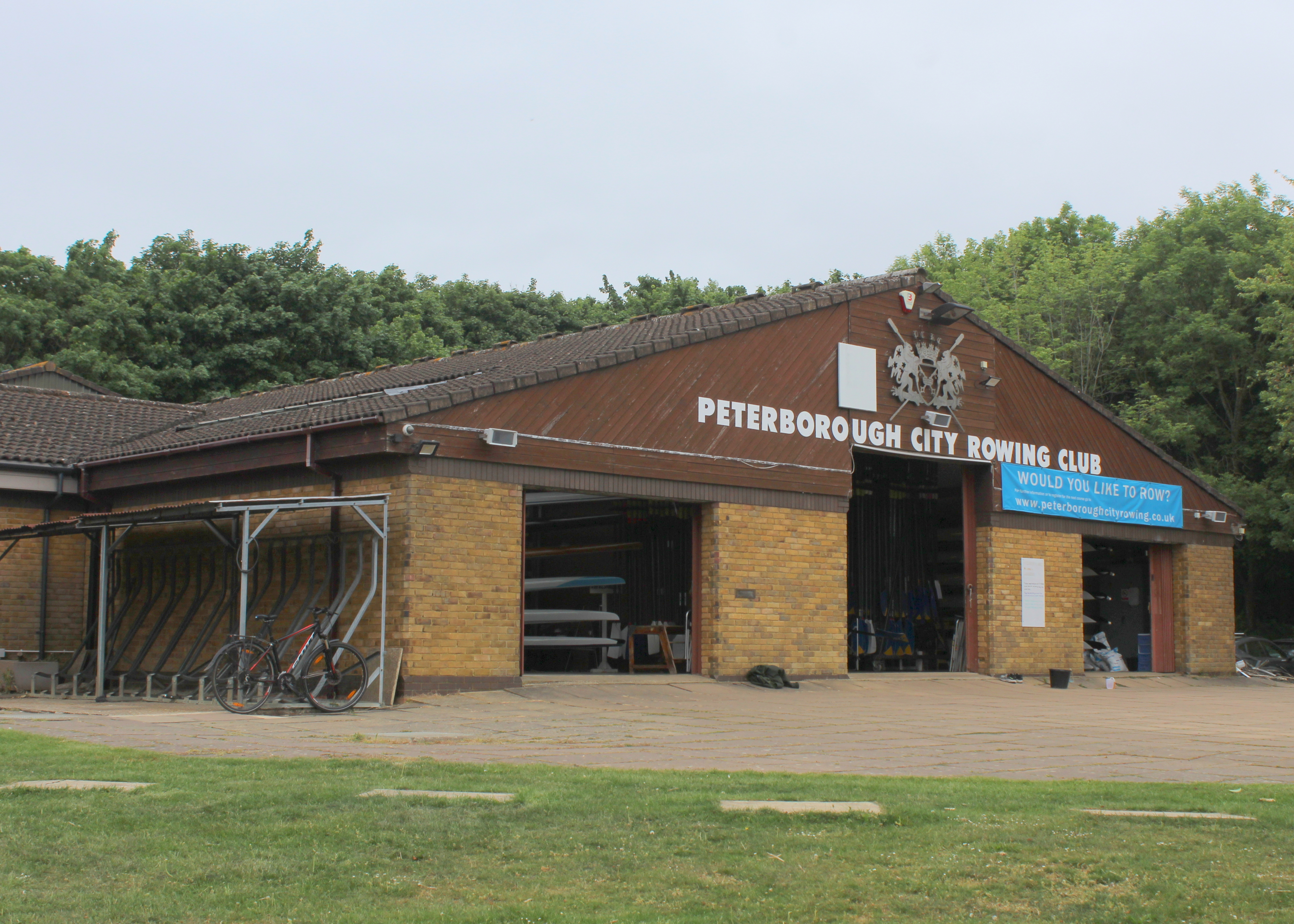

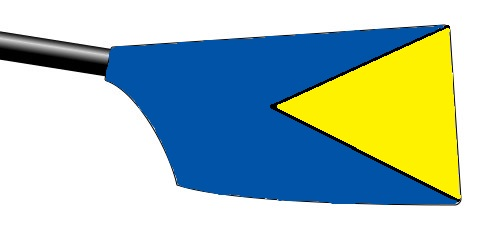
- Location: Thorpe Meadows, Peterborough, Cambridgeshire, England
- Coordinates: 52.570066°N 0.270664°W
- Founded: 1948
- Affiliations: British Rowing (boat code PET)
- Website: peterboroughcityrowing.co.uk

Peterborough City Rowing Club is a rowing club based at Thorpe Meadows, Peterborough, Cambridgeshire, England.

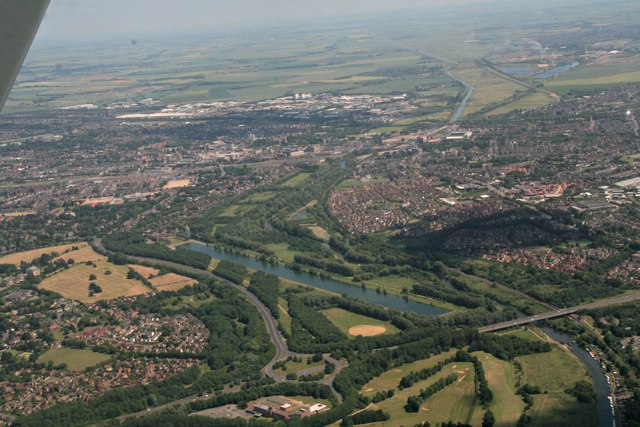
Aerial view of Thorpe Meadows rowing lake

== History ==
The club was founded in 1948 and is affiliated to British Rowing. In 1983 the club moved to the purpose built rowing lake at Thorpe Meadows.

The club has produced multiple British champions since 1975.

== Honours ==
=== British champions ===
Year	Winning crew/s
1975	Men L1x
1976	Men L1x
1981	Women J18 2x
1994	Men J18 4x
1996	Men J15 2x
1997	Men J16 2x
1999	Men J18 2x
2000	Men J16 2x, Women J18 2x
2002	Women L1x, Men J18 2x
2005	Open J16 1x, Women J14 1x
2007	Open J15 1x, Open J14 1x
2008	Open J16 1x, Open J15 1x
2009	Open J16 1x
2011	Open J18 4x

== Notable members ==
- James Fox
- Adam Neill
- Peter Zeun
