= Auriol Kensington Rowing Club =

British rowing club

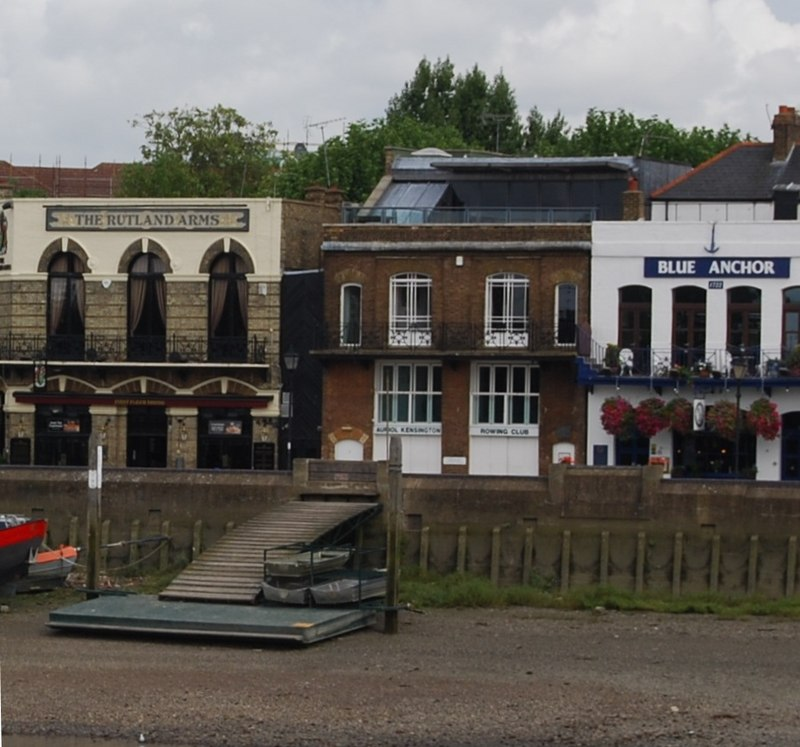

- Location: Hammersmith, London, England
- Coordinates: 51°29′22.6″N 0°13′51.6″W
- Home water: Tideway
- Founded: 1981
- Affiliations: British Rowing boat code - AKN
- Website: www.akrowing.com

Events
- Hammersmith Regatta, Hammersmith Head, Hammersmith Women and Juniors Head

Auriol Kensington Rowing Club is a rowing club in Hammersmith, west London, England. The club was formed in 1981 by the amalgamation of Auriol Rowing Club which was founded in 1896 and Kensington Rowing Club which was founded in 1872. The clubhouse is on Lower Mall adjacent to Hammersmith Bridge.

Rowing is divided into senior squads for oarsmen and women, a novice group and a masters section for those 27+ not entering Senior (foremost adult) races. Groups compete throughout the year at events such as the Fours Head, the Women's Eights Head of the River Race, the Head of the River Race, the Veterans Head during the winter and, on a different stretch of river in the summer, Henley Women's Regatta and Henley Royal Regatta. The club also annually enters competitions in the Lea Valley, upstream to Reading, Berkshire, including multi-lane national events at Dorney Lake such as 'the Met' and Wallingford Regatta.

== History ==
In 1907 John de Greet Edye won the Wingfield Sculls rowing for Auriol RC.

Peter Haining won three consecutive Wingfield Sculls for the club from 1994 through to 1996 and for a fourth time in 2000.

Notable adult winners since 2010 have included success in the 2013 Masters British Championships.

In 2025 the club won its first British title since 2006, when winning the women club 8+ at the 2025 British Rowing Club Championships.

== Honours ==
=== Henley Royal Regatta ===
Year	Races won
1910	Diamond Challenge Sculls
1911	Diamond Challenge Sculls

=== Wingfield Sculls ===
Year	Races won
1907	John de Greet Edye (Auriol)
1994	Peter Haining
1995	Peter Haining
1996	Peter Haining
2000	Peter Haining

=== British champions ===
Year	Winning crew/s
1990	Men lightweight 4x
1995	Men 2x, Men lightweight 2x
1999	Men 2x
2001	Men lightweight 1x
2004	Women lightweight 2-
2005	Women lightweight 1x
2006	Women 2x, Women lightweight 2x, Women U23 2x
2025	Women club 8+

== Notable members ==
- John de Greet Edye
- Peter Haining
- Graham Hill
- W.D. "Wally" Kinnear
- Hugh Mackworth-Praed

== See also ==
- Rowing on the River Thames
