= Evesham Rowing Club =

British rowing club

- Location: The Boathouse, Abbey Park, Evesham, Worcestershire
- Coordinates: 52.089462°N 1.945808°W
- Founded: 1863
- Affiliations: British Rowing (boat code EVE)
- Website: www.erc.club

Evesham Rowing Club is a rowing club on the River Avon, based at The Boathouse, Abbey Park, Evesham, Worcestershire.

== History ==
The club was founded in 1863 and has facilities for all age groups.

The club won the prestigious Fawley Challenge Cup at the Henley Regatta in 2002, as part of the composite crew with Leander and has produced multiple national champions.

== Honours ==
=== British champions ===
Year	Winning crew/s
1981	Men J18 2x
1984	Men L8+
1985	Men L4-, Men J18 2+, Men J16 1x
1990	Women J16 2-
1997	Women L2x, Men J14 1x, Women J15 1x
2000	Women J16 2x
2002	Women J14 2x
2006	Open J15 2x
2007	Open J16 4+, Open J16 4x
2008	Open J16 4+
2009	Women 4-, Women 8+, Open J18 2x, Women J18 4-
2010	Open J16 4+
2013	Open J16 2-
2021	WJ15 1x

=== Henley Royal Regatta ===
Year	Winning crew
2002	Fawley Challenge Cup
