= Bedford Rowing Club =

British rowing club

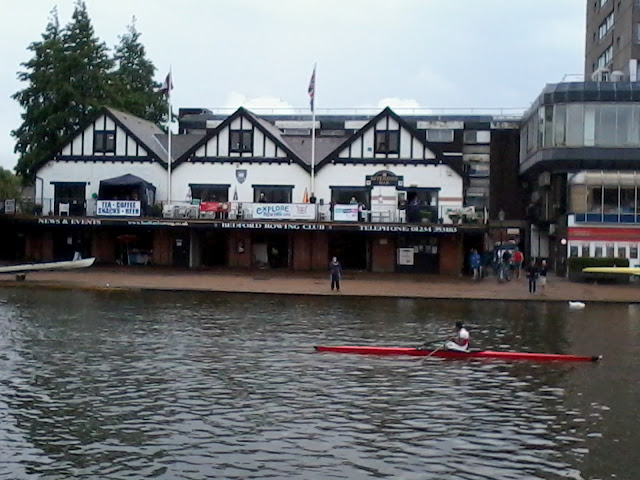

- Location: Bedford, England
- Coordinates: 52.13408°N 0.464844°W
- Home water: River Great Ouse
- Founded: 1886
- Affiliations: British Rowing boat code - BED
- Website: www.bedfordrowing.co.uk

Events
- List: Bedford Eights and Fours Head; Bedford Small Boats Head (Spring); Bedford Amateur Regatta; Bedford Quarts Sprint Regatta; Bedford Small Boats Head (Autumn)

Bedford Rowing Club is an amateur rowing club in Bedford, England, founded on 15 March 1886.

== History ==
Despite Bedford Regatta having been founded in 1853, there is no record of any rowing clubs in Bedford until 1886. at a meeting chaired by the Mayor. It was minuted that:

1. That it be advisable that a Rowing Club be formed in Bedford.
2. That it be called the Bedford Amateur Rowing Club.
3. That amateurs only, as defined by the rules of the Amateur Rowing Association, be eligible to become members.
4. That a Committee be elected by the meeting to draw up Rules for the Club & amount of subscriptions.
5. That all members be swimmers.

The original minutes are held in the Bedfordshire archives and a copy is on display in the Club. The colours are maroon, white and blue.

== Current activities ==
The club regularly competes across the UK at all levels and has a broad membership base, from complete novices and juniors through to senior oarsmen and veterans.

== Competitions ==
The club hosts three Head Races each year as well as a popular Sprint Regatta:

- The Eights & Fours Head is held on the second Sunday in February.
- The Spring Small Boats Head is usually held on the second Sunday in April, though the date may be changed, depending on when Easter is celebrated.
- The Sprint Regatta is held on the Sunday between Henley Royal Regatta and the National Championships.
- The Autumn Small Boats Head is held on the second Sunday in October.

== Honours ==
=== British champions ===
Year	Winning crew/s
1972	Men J18 1x
1977	Men J18 2x
1991	Men 2-, Men L8+, Women J18 2x, Women J16 2x, Women J16 4x
1992	Men L2x
1994	Women 4+
1995	Women 4-
1996	Women 4-, Women 8+, Women L2-
2011	Open J15 1x
