= Thames Tradesmen's Rowing Club =

British rowing club

- Emblem: Pair of crossed pre-1960 "standard" ("square") golden oars around red T T R C, green wreath and base.
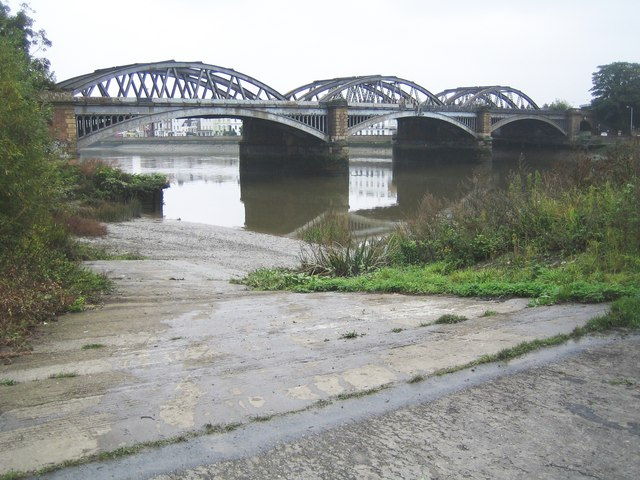

- Location: University of London Boathouse, Hartington Road, W4
- Coordinates: 51.473°N 0.255°W
- Home water: Tideway, River Thames
- Founded: 1897
- Membership: No qualification/academic restrictions to admission
- Affiliations: British Rowing boat code: TTR
- Website: www.ttrc.org.uk

Distinctions
- 4-time winners of Henley's Grand Cup for club eights (incepted 1839) (1975 to 1981)

The Thames Tradesmen's Rowing Club is a rowing club on the Tideway (upper estuary of the Thames) in West London, United Kingdom at University of London Boathouse, Hartington Road, Chiswick W4.

== Foundation and colours ==
The club was established in 1897. Its kit colours are white, claret and green (Note: All-in-one lycras since 2010 are black and white with claret and green trim (and both as chest bands, but no chest bands – so white in the compression/"tech" top) other splashproof kit is mainly black.) If the claret dates to two years or more later it may be a nod to Thames Ironworks F.C. If adopted later, the order is the same and top colour only a slight shade different from the suffragette flag, devised in 1908 and widely seen until the 1920s.

== Ethos ==
Until 1956, the club was one of the leading and few London members of the National Amateur Rowing Association and helped to bring about the gradual merger with the Amateur Rowing Association for people in 'non-physical' work, to which were affiliated the various clubs on the Putney Embankment. The club continues to stand firmly against social barriers and has inducted and enhanced the fitness and technical ability of rowers including international-standard oarsmen since the 1960s. The club's leaders over decades of the 20th century won its successful campaign with Poplar Blackwall and District Rowing Club and other NARA clubs – most of which were from the industrial heartlands of Britain – for non-exclusivity in rowing events and national teams, as evidenced in Rowing in England: A Social History. These two clubs in London thus have the strongest record of openness and widening of participation. GB Rowing now has many leading athletes who are not alumni of the old, well-endowed schools and universities which set up the earliest competitions in the sport.

== Training ==
Thames Tradesmen compete in the Head of the River Race and its three offshoots for smaller boats than eights each year. The club organizes a training camp each year before Henley Royal Regatta. During the Summer Season, TTRC is prominent on the regatta circuit and look to peak at Henley and The National Championships.

== Setting ==
Alongside Barnes Bridge Ladies Rowing Club, the club is the closest club to Barnes, much of Chiswick, Acton, the London Borough of Brent and Roehampton. Its size and dedicated long slipway make it attractive to schools and in subscription price for central, west, north-west and south-west London. Its coaching/coxes rooms and broad boat bays are in a very large two-storey building. The upstairs is a shared clubroom and ten changing rooms sponsored by the local London borough divided up at weekends with two clubs sharing the rugby and football fields adjoining.

Its clubroom and shared lounge is large and overlooks most of Barnes's ornate riverside buildings.

== Honours ==
=== Henley Royal Regatta ===
Year	Races won		
1971	Stewards' Challenge Cup	Silver Goblets & Nickalls' Challenge Cup	
1973	Wyfold Challenge Cup		
1975	Grand Challenge Cup	Wyfold Challenge Cup	
1976	Grand Challenge Cup	Prince Philip Challenge Cup	
1977	Silver Goblets & Nickalls' Challenge Cup		
1978	Silver Goblets & Nickalls' Challenge Cup		
1979	Grand Challenge Cup	Double Sculls Challenge Cup	
1981	Grand Challenge Cup	Stewards' Challenge Cup	Queen Mother Challenge Cup
1982	Women's Invitation Single Sculls		
1985	Queen Mother Challenge Cup		

=== Recent British champions ===
Year	Winning crew/s
1996	Women 8+c, Men L4-, Women L1x
1997	Men L8+, Women L1x
1999	Men 2-, Women 4x, Women L4x, Men J18 1x
2001	Women 2-
2003	Women J15 4x+

== Notes and references ==
Notes

== See also ==
- Rowing on the River Thames
