= 2001 British Rowing Championships =

British National Rowing Championships

- Venue: National Water Sports Centre
- Location: Holme Pierrepont (Nottingham)
- Dates: 20–22 July 2001

The 2001 British Rowing Championships known as the National Championships at the time, were the 30th edition of the National Championships, held from 20–22 July 2001 at the National Water Sports Centre in Holme Pierrepont, Nottingham. They were organised and sanctioned by British Rowing, and are open to British rowers.

== Senior ==
=== Medal summary ===
Event	Gold	Silver	Bronze
Men 1x	Nautilus; Matt Langridge	London University; Tim Foster	Leander; Simon Cottle
Men 2-	Robert Gordon University / Aberdeen University	London University	Imperial College
Men 2x	NCRA	Burway / Reading	Tideway Scullers School/Furnivall SC
Men 4-	Oxford University	Worcester	Rob Roy
Men 4x	Tideway Scullers School	Oxford & District	Aberdeen University / Leander / George Watson's/Marlow
Men 4+	NCRA	London University	Nautilus
Men 8+	Oxford University / Isis	Molesey	NCRA
Women 1x	Wallingford	Winchester College	Upper Thames
Women 2x	Hereford	Queen's Tower	Thames / Tideway Scullers School
Women 2-	Thames Tradesmen's	Thames	Nottingham
Women 4x	Nautilus	Tideway Scullers School	Evesham / Headington School / St Neots
Women 4-	Kingston	Nautilus	Clydesdale / Edinburgh University / Aberdeen
Women 4+	Thames	Oxford Brookes University	Molesey
Women 8+	Thames	Twickenham	Thames

== Lightweight ==
=== Medal summary ===
Event	Gold	Silver	Bronze
Men L1x	Auriol Kensington	Exeter	Bacon
Men L2x	Tideway Scullers School	Upper Thames	NCRA
Men L2-	NCRA	Upper Thames	Clyde
Men L4-	NCRA	Furnivall SC	London
Men L4x	Aberdeen University / Leander / George Watson's College / Marlow	Walton	Peterborough City
Women L1x	Liverpool Victoria	NCRA	Bewl Bridge
Women L2x	Thames	Hereford	Thames
Women L2-	Tideway Scullers School / Globe	Clydesdale	Tideway Scullers School / Durham University
Women L4x	Rebecca	Mortlake Anglian & Alpha / Globe / Upper Thames	Avon County / Tideway Scullers School / Durham University
Women L4-	Kingston	Imperial College / Queen's Tower	Nottingham

== U 23 ==
=== Medal summary ===
Event	Gold	Silver	Bronze
Men 1x	Nottingham University	Stirling	Staffordshire University

== Coastal ==
=== Medal summary ===
Event	Gold	Silver	Bronze
Men 1x	Southsea	BTC Southampton	Bournemouth University
Men 2-	Itchen Imperial	Westover & Bournemouth	Ryde
Men 4+	Bournemouth University Alumni	Lymington	Shanklin & Sandown

== Junior ==
=== Medal summary ===
Event	Gold	Silver	Bronze
Men 1x	Dulwich College	Hollingworth Lake	Burton Leander
Men 2-	Glasgow	RGS Lancaster	Canford School
Men 2x	Dulwich College / Imperial College	Dulwich College	Tiffin
Men 4-	Aberdeen Schools	Tiffin	Bedford School
Men 4x	Tiffin	Windsor Boys' School	Leander / Stourport
Men 4+	Windsor Boys' School	King's School Worcester	Molesey
Men J16 1x	Tideway Scullers School	Peterborough City	Marlow
Men J16 2-	Hampton School	Upper Thames	Shiplake College
Men J16 2x	Marlow	Henley	St George's College
Men J16 4+	Upper Thames	Aberdeen Schools	King's School Chester
Men J16 4x	Windsor Boys' School	Tiffin	Gloucester
Men J15 1x	Marlow	Evesham	King's School Worcester
Men J15 2x	Northwich	Dulwich College	St Neots
Men J15 4x+	Windsor Boys' School	Dulwich College	Maidenhead
Men J14 1x	Hereford	St Neots	Maidenhead
Men J14 2x	Reading Blue Coat School	Upper Thames	Evesham
Men J14 4x+	RGS Worcester	Burway	Reading Blue Coat School
Women 2-	Lady Eleanor Holles School	Canford School	Aberdeen Schools
Women 2x	Henley	Wycliffe Sculling Centre	York City / St.Peters
Women 4-	Haberdasher's Monmouth Girls	Henley	N/A
Women 4x	Henley A	Henley B	St Leonard's School
Women 4+	Haberdasher's Monmouth Girls	Aberdeen Schools	Bedford High School
Women 8+	Headington School	Haberdasher's Monmouth Girls	King's School Worcester
Women J16 1x	Wycliffe College	Durham	Cambois
Women J16 2x	Reading / Pangbourne College	Star Club / Dame Alice Harpur	Grange School
Women J16 4x	Headington School	Lady Eleanor Holles School	Nithsdale
Women J15 1x	Queen Elizabeth HS	Marlow	Nithsdale
Women J15 2x	Avon County	Marlow	Northwich
Women J15 4x+	Tideway Scullers School	Avon County / Gloucester	King's School Worcester
Women J14 1x	St Neots A	Reading	St Neots B
Women J14 2x	Hollingworth Lake	St Neots	Henley
Women J14 4x+	St Neots	Headington School	Henley

Key
Symbol	meaning
1, 2, 4, 8	crew size
+	coxed
-	coxless
x	sculls
14	Under-14
15	Under-15
16	Under-16
J	Junior
