= Robert Gordon University Boat Club =

Scottish rowing club

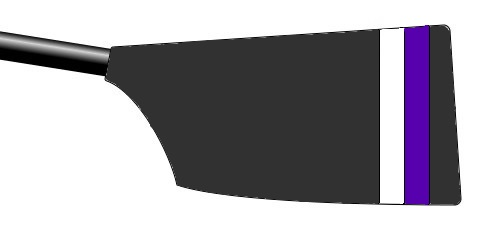
- Location: Aberdeen, Scotland
- Coordinates: 57.136367°N 2.094108°W
- Home water: River Dee, Aberdeenshire
- Founded: 1992
- University: Robert Gordon University
- Affiliations: Scottish Rowing; Committee of the Dee

Events
- Aberdeen Universities' Boat Race

Robert Gordon University Boat Club (RGUBC) is the rowing club at Robert Gordon University in Aberdeen, Scotland. The club is affiliated to Scottish Rowing.

== History ==
The club was founded in 1992.

In 1996 the club secured their first boathouse after moving out of Aberdeen Boat Club's boathouse into what was formerly the base for the RGIT Survival Centre next to Queen Elizabeth Bridge.

In 2012 the club formed University Rowing Aberdeen (URA) in partnership with the Aberdeen University Boat Club so that both clubs could share resources, funding and coaching.

== Competitions ==
- Scottish Universities Rowing Championships
- Scottish Indoor Championships, Scottish Rowing Championships
- BUCS and the British Rowing Championships
- Aberdeen Universities' Boat Race
- Strathclyde Park Regatta
- Inverness Head

== Aberdeen Universities' Boat Race ==
Contested between Robert Gordon's University and The University of Aberdeen; it is Scotland's second oldest university boat race, behind the Scottish Boat Race competed between The University of Glasgow and The University of Edinburgh.

Winners

- The University of Aberdeen BC (1995–2005, 2007–2008, 2010–2011, 2017, 2019–2026)
- Robert Gordon University BC (2006, 2009, 2012–2016, 2018)

== Honours ==
=== National champions ===
Year	Winning crew/s
2001	Men 2-

== See also ==
- University rowing (UK)
- Scottish Boat Race
