= Aberdeen University Boat Club =

Scottish rowing club

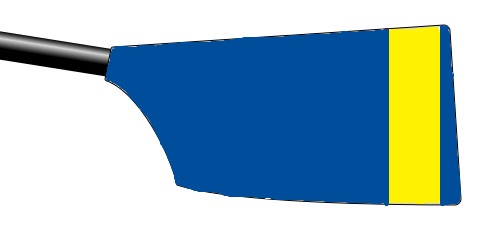
- Location: S Esplanade W, Aberdeen, Scotland
- Coordinates: 57.136465°N 2.093705°W
- Founded: 1865
- Affiliations: Scottish Rowing
- Website: www.ausa.org.uk/sports/club/6108/

Aberdeen University Boat Club is a rowing club on the River Dee, based at S Esplanade W, Aberdeen, Scotland. The club is affiliated to Scottish Rowing.

== History ==
The club belongs to the University of Aberdeen and was founded in 1865. In 1881, an application for a boathouse was sent to the Finance and Fishery committee of the Harbour Board.

In 2012, the club formed University Rowing Aberdeen (URA) in partnership with the Robert Gordon University Boat Club so that both clubs could share resources, funding, and coaching.

The club has produced several national champions.

=== Aberdeen Universities' Boat Race ===
The club contests the Aberdeen Universities' Boat Race against Robert Gordon University Boat Club, which has run since 1996. The race takes place along a 3.5km stretch of the River Dee. The club has won a majority of the events. It is Scotland's second oldest boat race (after the Scottish Boat Race competed between The University of Glasgow and The University of Edinburgh), and has a mixed crew, unusually for rowing. Three races are currently contested. Owing the Covid lockdowns, the 2021 boat race was downscaled, with only a single race taking place, without spectators.

== Honours ==
=== National champions ===
Year	Winning crew/s
2001	Men 2-, Men L4x
2004	Open Ltw 2x
2006	Women Ltw2-, Women U23 1x

=== Aberdeen Universities' Boat Race ===
Team	Years Won
Aberdeen University	1996, 1997, 1998, 1999, 2000, 2001, 2002, 2003, 2004, 2005, 2007, 2008, 2010, 2011, 2017, 2019, 2020, 2021, 2022, 2023, 2024, 2025, 2026
Robert Gordon University	2006, 2009, 2012, 2013, 2014, 2015, 2016, 2018
