= Glasgow Rowing Club =

British rowing club

Glasgow Rowing Club (GRC)

- Location: Gorbals, Glasgow
- Coordinates: 55°50′36″N 4°14′27″W
- Home water: River Clyde
- Founded: 1983
- Membership: 122 (October 2025)
- Affiliations: Scottish Rowing
- Website: www.glasgowrowingclub.org/

Events
- Glasgow Spring Regatta, Glasgow Fours Head

Notable members
- Sam Scrimgeour; Polly Swann

Glasgow Rowing Club is a rowing club, based in the Gorbals area of Glasgow, Scotland. It is a private club, with no direct public funding. Application for membership is open to all. The club is affiliated to Scottish Rowing.

== History ==
The club was formed on 4 December 1983 by the amalgamation of Glasgow Argonauts Boat Club (GABC), founded in 1924 and City of Glasgow Amateur Rowing Club (CGARC), founded in 1965. GABC was originally a club for the Alumni of Glasgow University Boat Club, and CGARC was formerly The Printers Rowing Club founded early 1900s.

Both clubs had for some years resided as tenants of other clubs and part of the reason for the merger was the shared desire to build new premises. The boathouse, which was officially opened by the Lord Provost of Glasgow in May 1997, is located in Silverfir Place on the south bank of the River Clyde, just along from Shawfield Stadium.

The club colours are yellow and red. These were chosen to reflect the club's origins and were the minor colours of the predecessor clubs: GABC colours were pale blue, black and gold (not yellow) and CGARC were dark blue and red. The oar design has changed from the original yellow with red collar and red tip, through the design displayed, to the current design.

Current branding colours are:

- Red Paint - RAL 3002 (pantone 187)
- Yellow Paint - RAL 1003 (pantone 1003)
- Black paint - RAL 9005 (pantone black)

== Major successes ==
In the 2004 UK National Rowing Championships in Nottingham member Lindsay Dick won the women's single sculls event, while her fellow member and partner Alastair Warnock won the equivalent men's event. Warnock also made good progress in the Diamond Challenge Sculls at Henley Royal Regatta that year, with one particularly noteworthy scalp in the first round, only to be beaten in the semi-final by the eventual winner of the event.

Lindsay Dick won a Bronze medal at the 2006 World Rowing Championships at Dorney Lake in the Women's Lightweight Quadruple Sculls.

At Henley Royal Regatta in 2009 the club set a precedent for Scottish rowing clubs by having crews race in quarter-finals of two different events (the Britannia Challenge Cup and the Wyfold Challenge Cup), although neither crew progressed to the semi-final stage. Previous Henley participation has included Fran Jacob racing in the Princess Royal Challenge Cup in 2008 and Alastair Warnock who reached the semi-final stage of the Diamond Challenge Sculls in successive years; in 2004 and 2005.

Later in 2009, at the National Rowing Championships, Glasgow crews won Men's Lightweight Fours (C. Logan, K. Docherty, J. Logan and S. Scrimgeour) and Men's Lightweight Pairs (C. Logan and J. Logan). Glasgow also had a share in the composite crew that won the Silver medal in Women's eights.

In March 2010, Glasgow members provided the core of a composite crew, along with rowers from Glasgow and Strathclyde Universities, that won the Novice Academic category at the Women's Eights Head of the River Race (WEHoRR).

== Honours ==
=== British champions ===
Year	Winning crew/s
1984	Women J18 1x
1985	Women L4-
1986	Women L1x
1987	Women 4x
1996	Men 2x
1998	Men 2x
2001	Men J18 2-
2004	Open 1x, Women 1x
2008	Women 1x
2009	Women 8+, Open L2-, Open L4-
2012	Women J15 2x
