= Simon Cottle =

Simon Cottle may refer to:

- Simon Cottle (rower)
- Simon Cottle (writer)
