= Martin Lauchlan =

Scottish footballer and manager

Personal information
- Date of birth: 1 October 1980 (age 46)
- Place of birth: Glasgow, Scotland
- Position: Midfielder

Youth career
- Partick Thistle B.C.

Senior career*
Years	Team	Apps	(Gls)
1997–1999	Partick Thistle	37	(5)
1999–2003	St Johnstone	6	(0)
2001–2002	→ Dumbarton (loan)	11	(1)
2003–2005	Stenhousemuir	54	(5)
2005–2006	→ Finn Harps (loan)		
2005–2006	Elgin City	9	(0)
2006–2009	Bellshill Athletic		
2009–2010	Petershill		
Total		117	(11)

Managerial career
- 2014–2016: Rossvale
- 2016–2017: East Kilbride
- 2017–: Strathclyde University
- 2019–: Petershill
- * Club domestic league appearances and goals

Martin Lauchlan (born 1 October 1980) is a Scottish football manager and former professional footballer who was previously manager of West of Scotland League club Petershill. He played for several clubs in the Scottish Premier League and Scottish Football League, including Partick Thistle, St Johnstone and Stenhousemuir.

== Playing career ==
Lauchlan came through the youth system at Partick Thistle and made his debut for the club against Morton in January 1998. In spite of injury affecting his early development at Thistle, Lauchlan moved to St Johnstone in July 1999, for an initial fee of £45,000. The midfielder made six Premier League appearances in his four years at Saints, all as substitute, and spent time on loan at Dumbarton. Released by St Johnstone in July 2003, he joined Stenhousemuir then later played for Irish side Finn Harps and Elgin City before dropping to Junior level with Bellshill Athletic, Petershill, Vale of Clyde and Shettleston.

== Managerial career ==
Lauchlan joined Forth Wanderers as assistant manager in August 2012 and later occupied a similar role at Wishaw Juniors. He became a manager in his own right when appointed Rossvale boss in July 2014 and led the club to their first honour in the Junior game by winning the 2014–15 Central District Second Division title .

On 28 February 2016, Lauchlan resigned as manager of Rossvale. He was then appointed manager of Lowland Football League outfit East Kilbride. In his first season, East Kilbride won the 2016–17 Lowland Football League. East Kilbride progressed to the promotion/relegation playoff final, but missed out on promotion when they lost a penalty shootout against Cowdenbeath. He left the club at the end of the season, having won four trophies during fourteen months in charge.

Lauchlan joined Strathclyde University as their first team manager in August 2017. He returned to Petershill as manager in August 2019.

Lauchlan represented Scotland at youth level during his spell at Partick Thistle. He is the brother of fellow professional footballer Jim Lauchlan.
