= EUBC =

EUBC is an abbreviation that may refer to:

- European Boxing Confederation
- Edinburgh University Boat Club, the rowing club of Edinburgh University, Scotland
