= Stirling University Boat Club =

Scottish rowing club

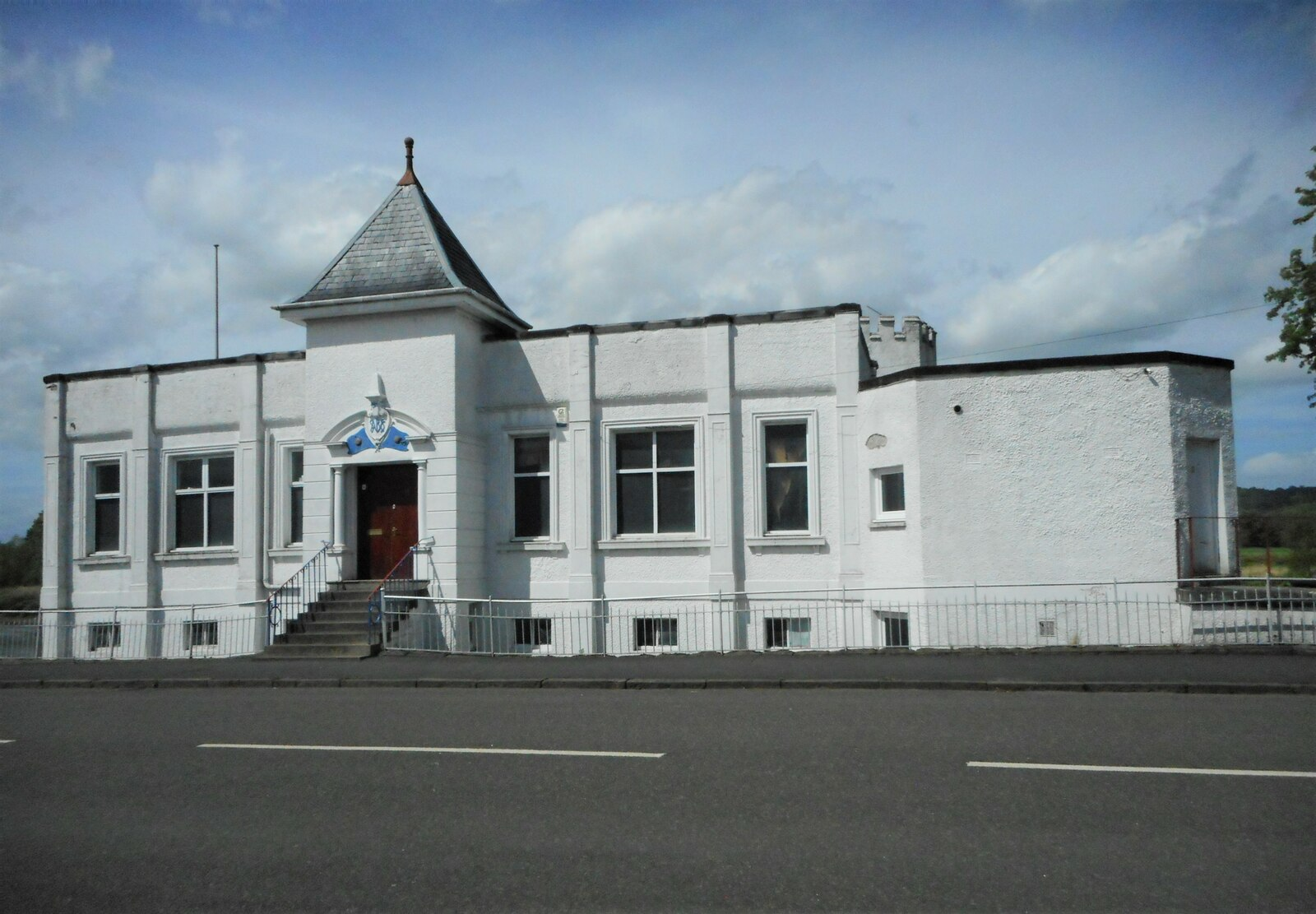

- Motto: Innovation and Excellence
- Location: Stirling, Scotland
- Home water: River Forth
- Founded: 1987
- University: University of Stirling
- Colours: Green
- Affiliations: Scottish Rowing
- Website: www.facebook.com/stirlinguniversityrowing

Events
- Tayforth Boat Race

Stirling University Boat Club is one of the sports clubs who are part of University of Stirling, in the city of Stirling, Scotland. SUBC is affiliated to Scottish Rowing, the National Governing Body for rowing in Scotland.

== History ==
The club was founded in 1987.

In December 2013, the university played host to the competition BUCS Indoors, an indoor ergometer event, at the Gannochy Sports Hall.

In March 2023, the club returned to the water after missing four years through a combination of COVID-19 pandemic and mismanagement.

== Training ==
Training sessions on the water take place at Stirling Rowing Club located near the centre of Stirling, on a stretch of the River Forth. Land training sessions take place at the University of Stirling, Scotland's University for Sporting Excellence. The club makes use of the high class weights rooms for Strength and Conditioning.

== Tayforth Boat Race ==
The Tayforth Boat Race is the annual university boat race between the University of Stirling and the University of Dundee. The race features competing coxed fours (4+) and/or mixed eights (8+) on a 2 km stretch of the River Forth.

== See also ==
- Scottish Rowing
- University rowing (UK)
