= 1997 British Rowing Championships =

- Venue: National Water Sports Centre
- Location: Holme Pierrepont (Nottingham)
- Dates: 18–20 July 1997

The 1997 British Rowing Championships known as the National Championships at the time, were the 26th edition of the National Championships, held from 18–20 July 1997 at the National Water Sports Centre in Holme Pierrepont, Nottingham. They were organised and sanctioned by British Rowing, and are open to British rowers.

== Senior ==
=== Medal summary ===
Event	Gold	Silver	Bronze
Men 1x	Molesey; Greg Searle	Leander	Kingston
Men 2+	Molesey	Cambridge University	Kingston/Tideway Scullers School
Men 2x	Tideway Scullers School	Queen Elizabeth HS / Marlow	London
Men 2-	Queen's Tower	Aberdeen	Royal Chester
Men 4-	Cambridge University	Nottingham	London
Men 4x	NCRA / Oxford University / Poplar / Queen's Tower	Durham / Leander / Nottingham	Bradford on Avon / Leander / Windsor Boys' School
Men 4+	NCRA/Newcastle University	Lea	Molesey
Men 8+	Nottingham	Imperial College / Queen's Tower / Molesey/Oxford University	London University / Tyrian
Women 1x	City of Sheffield	Rob Roy	Nottingham & Union
Women 2x	Hereford	Grosvenor/Thames	Tideway Scullers School
Women 2-	Edinburgh University / London University	George Watson's	Hereford
Women 4x	Thames B	NCRA / Henley / Thames Tradesmen's / City of Sheffield	Thames A
Women 4-	Molesey / Imperial College / Queen's Tower / Oxford University	Headington School / Lady Eleanor Holles School / Warwick	Tideway Scullers School
Women 4+	Tideway Scullers School	Army / Nottingham & Union / Bedford	Edinburgh University
Women 8+	Imperial College / Queen's Tower	Marlow	Thames

== Lightweight ==
=== Medal summary ===
Event	Gold	Silver	Bronze
Men L1x	Stirling	Kingston	Vesta
Men L2x	Tideway Scullers School	Stourport	Hereford
Men L2-	Marlow A	Birmingham / Birmingham University	Marlow B
Men L4-	NCRA/London	Clyde / St Andrew	Thames Tradesmen's
Men L4x	Walton	Tideway Scullers School B	Tideway Scullers School A
Men L8+	Thames Tradesmen's	Nottingham	N/A
Women L1x	Thames Tradesmen's	Wallingford	Agecroft
Women L2x	Kingston / Evesham	Mortlake Anglian & Alpha	Hereford
Women L2-	Thames	Curlew	Avon County
Women L4x	Thames	Tideway Scullers School	Nottingham
Women L4-	Upper Thames /Thames	Upper Thames	Clydesdale / Clyde / St Andrew/Strathclyde Park

== U 23 ==
=== Medal summary ===
Event	Gold	Silver	Bronze
Men 1x	Nottingham & Union	Molesey	Nottingham
Women 1x	Tideway Scullers School	Peterborough City	N/A

== Coastal ==
=== Medal summary ===
Event	Gold	Silver	Bronze
Men 1x	Lymington A	Lymington B	N/A
Men 2-	Lymington	Southampton	N/A
Men 4+	BTC Southampton B	BTC Southampton A	Ryde
Women 4+	Southampton	Ryde	N/A

== Junior ==
=== Medal summary ===
Event	Gold	Silver	Bronze
Men 1x	Claires Court	Star Club	Nithsdale
Men 2-	Royal Shrewsbury School	Queen Elizabeth HS	Nithsdale
Men 2x	Rob Roy / Star Club	St George's College	Queen Elizabeth HS
Men 4-	Royal Shrewsbury School		
Men 4x	Leander	RGS Worcester	Wycliffe College
Men 4+	St Leonard's School	Kingston Grammar School	Sir John Deane's College
Men 8	Bedford School A	Bedford School B	RGS Worcester
Men J16 1x	Stirling	Wycliffe College	Burway
Men J16 2-	Bedford Modern School	Monkton Bluefriars	George Heriot's School
Men J16 2x	Peterborough City / Star Club	RGS Worcester	Kingston/Thames Tradesmen's
Men J16 4-	Eton College	Abingdon School	Newark
Men J16 4+	Bedford School	Eton College	Newark
Men J16 4x	Gloucester / Wycliffe College	Kingston / Peterborough City / PS	Lancaster RGS
Men J16 8	Eton College	Kingston Grammar School	Bedford School
Men J15 1x	Queen Elizabeth HS	Wycliffe College	Norwich
Men J15 2x	Westminster School	York City	Thames Tradesmen's
Men J15 4x+	Cambois	St George's College	RGS Worcester
Men J14 1x	Evesham	Burway	St George's College
Men J14 2x	Henley / London	St Leonard's School	Northwich
Men J14 4x+	RGS Worcester	Lancaster RGS	Hampton School
Women 1x	Henley	Norwich	Marlow
Women 2-	Headington School	Kingston Grammar School	Haberdasher's Monmouth Girls
Women 2x	Kingston Grammar School / George Watson's	Christchurch / Marlow	Worcester
Women 4x	Christchurch / Henley / Marlow / Queens Park High School	Sir William Borlase	Star Club
Women 4+	Henley	Headington School	Star Club
Women 8+	Aberdeen Schools / George Heriot's School / Nithsdale / George Watson's College	Kingston Grammar School	Lady Eleanor Holles School / King's School Worcester
Women J16 1x	Burway	Pengwern	Kingston Grammar School
Women J16 2x	George Watson's	Durham	Hereford
Women J16 4+	Aberdeen Schools	Queen Elizabeth HS	Bedford High School
Women J16 4x	Bedfordshire Schools	Sir William Borlase	Grange School
Women J16 8	Lady Eleanor Holles School	Grosvenor	Haberdasher's Monmouth Girls
Women J15 1x	Evesham	Loughborough	Hereford
Women J15 2x	Gloucester	George Watson's	Bradford on Avon / Monkton
Women J15 4x+	Gloucester	St Leonard's School	Tideway Scullers School
Women J14 1x	Cambois A	Cambois B	Queens Park High School
Women J14 2x	Henley	St Leonard's School	Headington School
Women J14 4x+	Henley	Gloucester	Cambois

Key

Symbol	meaning
1, 2, 4, 8	crew size
+	coxed
-	coxless
x	sculls
14	Under-14
15	Under-15
16	Under-16
J	Junior
