= Caledonian Locomotives F.C. =

Association football club in East Dunbartonshire, Scotland

Coordinates: 55.877761°N 4.229803°W

Caledonian Locomotives
- Full name: Caledonian Locomotives Football Club
- Founded: 1976 (As Woodhill Boys Club); 2010 (as Rossvale Juniors FC); 2022 (as Caledonian Locomotives)
- Dissolved: 31 May 2026
- Ground: Petershill Park, Glasgow
- Capacity: 1,500 (500 seated)
- Owner: Dom McInally
- Chairman: Dom McInally
- Manager: Danny Boyle & Gavin Mackie
- League: West of Scotland League Second Division
- 2025–26: West of Scotland League Second Division, 14th of 16

Caledonian Locomotives Football Club was a Scottish football club based in the north of Glasgow at Petershill Park, Springburn, and last played in the West of Scotland League Second Division.

The club was previously known as Rossvale Juniors Football Club prior to the 2023–24 season and originally from the town of Bishopbriggs, East Dunbartonshire. The Rossvale club continues as a separate entity, having split from the team which became Caledonian Locomotives in 2022.

Caledonian Locomotives folded in 2026 due to costs of running the club.

== History ==
Originally formed in 1976 by John Grey as Rossvale boys club, Rossvale run youth football teams from under 5 to over 35 level.

The decision was taken by Rossvale in early 2010 to enter an adult team in the Junior football set up, with the aim of allowing ex-youth players to remain in the game at a decent standard. Rossvale joined the Central District Second Division for the start of the 2011–12 season.

The club clinched their first Junior honour in March 2015 by winning the 2014–15 Central District Second Division title. A notable player in their victorious squad was former Aberdeen and Scotland striker Robbie Winters. Three years later the club won the Central District First Division title, and then immediately gained promotion to the West Region Premiership the following season. In 2020, like all West Region clubs, Rossvale moved to the senior pyramid by joining the West of Scotland Football League.

The team are based at Petershill Park in Glasgow (also home of Petershill and Glasgow City), having initially been based at Huntershill, where the owners, East Dunbartonshire Council, were unwilling to invest in upgrading its facilities. They moved for the 2017–18 season initially, with a groundsharing arrangement for first team fixtures also in place at New Tinto Park in Govan, Glasgow (home of Benburb).

The team was managed from November 2017 to September 2019 by former Albion Rovers defender Gordon Moffat. The management team of manager David Gormley and assistant manager Sean Higgins took over in September 2019 but left just before the new 21/22 season start.

In February 2022, Rossvale announced new co-owners, shareholder and directors to their structure, subject to SFA approval. Mark Tivey and Andrew Pritchard, co-owners of Europa Point F.C. in the Gibraltar National League, would join chairman Dom McInally in forming the new structure of Rossvale with the aim to provide new pathways into further European competition. Ultimately the partnership never came to fruition and was ended just four months later in June 2022.

Having split from the amateur sports club the previous year (with a grace period agreed between the two entities in which the WoSPL team were allowed to keep using the Rossvale name), in April 2023 it was announced that the name would be changed to Caledonian Thistle Football Club. However, this led to controversy as the planned name was seen to be too similar to Inverness Caledonian Thistle. The Inverness club announced they would take it forward to the SFA to determine the viability of the name change. Ultimately after amicable talks between both the boards of the two clubs, it was decided that Rossvale would change their name to Caledonian Locomotives FC, chosen to represent the rail industry in Springburn where the club play their home matches.

== Managers ==
- Ian Grey (Jul 2010 – Nov 2013)
- Alan Jack (Nov 2013 – Apr 2014)
- Martin Lauchlan (May 2014 – Feb 2016)
- Brian McGinty (Mar 2016 – Oct 2017)
- Gordon Moffat (Nov 2017 – Sep 2019)
- David Gormley (Sep 2019 – Aug 2021)
- Bill Reside (Aug 2021 - Aug 2021) (Caretaker Manager)
- Iain Diack (Aug 2021 - Nov 2021)
- Jamie Sandilands (Nov 2021 - July 22)
- Alan Bateman + Alex Miller (Assistant Manager) - (June 2022 - August 2022)
- Kevin Kelly (August 2022 – May 2024)
- Danny Boyle & Gavin Mackie (May 2024 - May 2026)

== Honours ==
As Rossvale

- West Region Central District First Division winners: 2017–18
- West Region Central District Second Division winners: 2014–15
