= The Boat Race of the North =

University rowing race

Event information
- Race area: Redheugh Bridge to Gateshead Millennium Bridge; River Tyne, Newcastle (Note: The 2018 race was held using the Durham Regatta long course on the Wear, from the Racecourse to Prebends Bridge.)
- Dates: 18 May 1997
- Sponsor: Northumbrian Water (− 2010); NE1 (2015 –); Siemens (2017 –)
- Host city: Newcastle
- Competitors: DUBC, NUBC
- Distance: 1,500 metres (4,900 ft)
- Website: dubc.co.uk newcastlerowing.com

Results
- Winner (2023): Newcastle

- The Boat Race of the North
- Number of wins (Note: Wins are calculated by the winner of the majority of races each year, which has varied from two to six. If the numbers are equal, a draw is declared)
Durham	Newcastle
8	8
- 4 draws

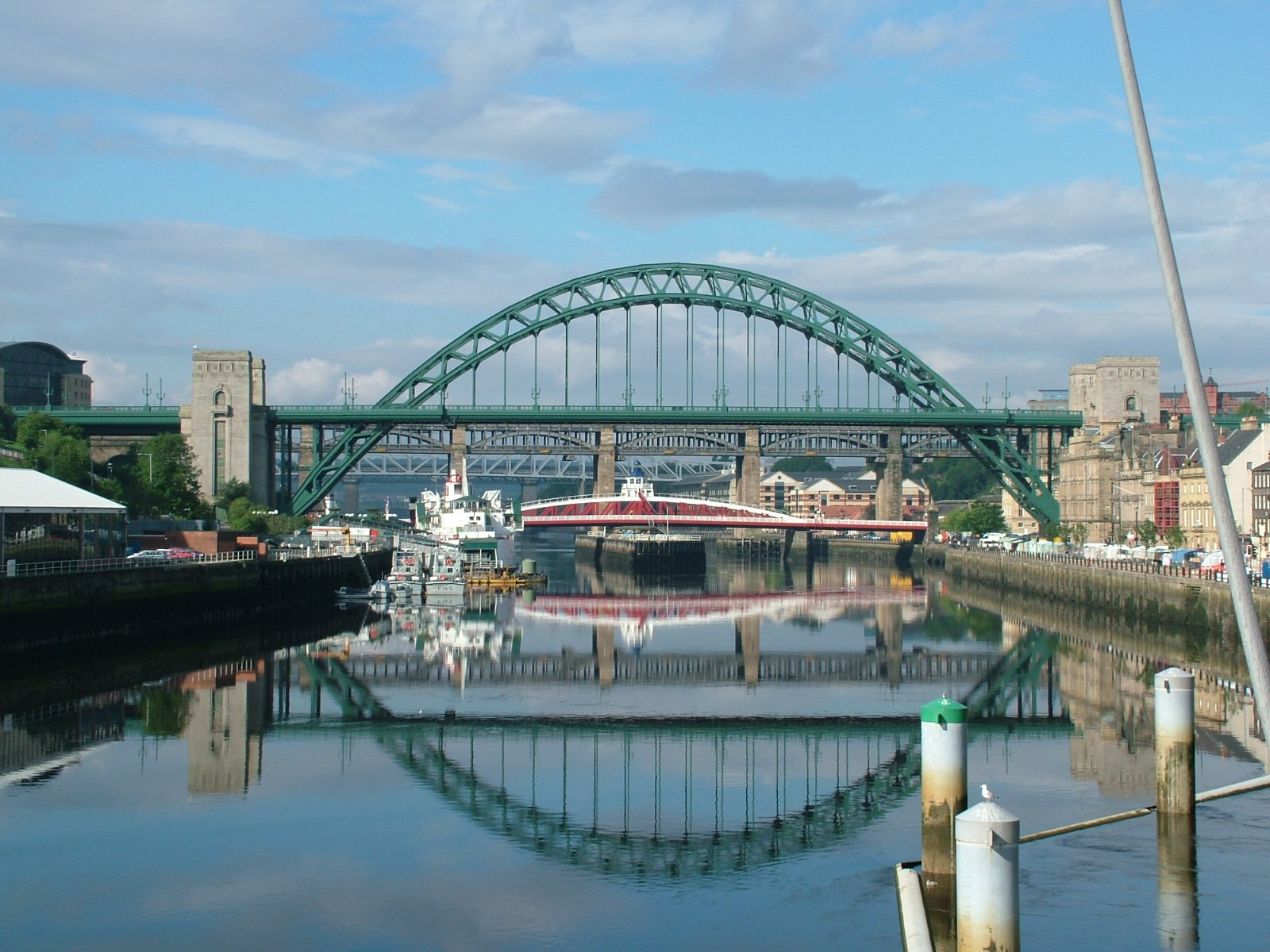
View along the course from its end point

The Boat Race of the North is an annual rowing event between the boat clubs of Durham and Newcastle universities in England. The event is usually staged on the River Tyne in Newcastle, although the 2018 race was held on the River Wear in Durham.

The inaugural event took place on 18 May 1997. Durham won eight of the first twelve competitions, before a hiatus between 2011 and 2014. Races recommenced in 2015, and Newcastle has won six of the seven events since then.

The event was sponsored for a number of years until 2010 by Northumbrian Water, and hence was known as the Northumbrian Water University Boat Race for this period. Since 2015 the race had been sponsored by the NE1 business development company, with Siemens also sponsoring from 2017, when the race became the Siemens Boat Race of the North.

== Races ==
The main rowing event consists of six races (from 2016), with trophies for the first and novice eights commemorating 19th century Tyne rowers

	Race	Trophy
1	Men's senior eights	The Clasper Trophy
2	Women's senior eights	The Chambers Trophy
3	Men's novice eights	The Renforth Trophy
4	Women's novice eights	The Taylor Trophy
5	Men's second eights	-
6	Women's second eights	-

Local entertainment is often provided, and other spectacles such as a parade of tall ships, a University Sailing Contest and a University Canoe Water Polo contest have enlivened the atmosphere prior to the main race.

Presentations are made after the races have finished in Baltic Square on the Gateshead side of the river.

The 2006 race and the crews' build up to the race was filmed for an ITV television show about rowing in the North East.

A race for junior rowers takes place before the main university races over the same course. It is usually contested between Tyne Amateur Rowing Club representing Newcastle and a composite of Durham Schools (usually Durham School and St Leonard's) representing Durham. The event does not count towards the overall trophy.

== Recent years ==
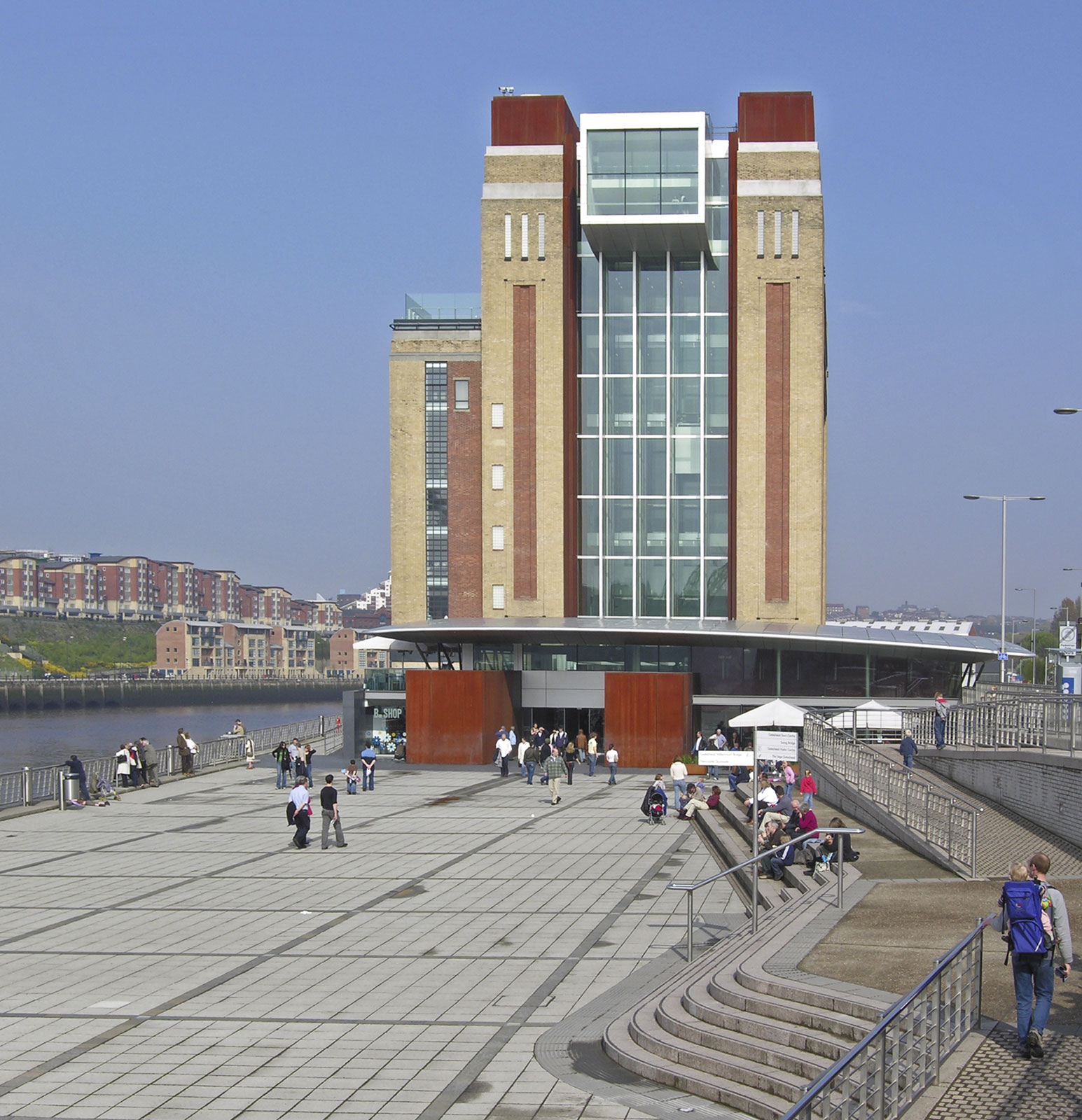
Gateshead's Baltic Square, used for award presentations.

=== 2009 event ===
The 2009 boat race took place on Saturday 9 May; this was the 13th event, although only ten of the twelve prior competitions had taken place, owing to bad weather. River-based entertainment started at 3:30pm, with the start of racing at 4:40pm. Newcastle took the overall title for the first time.

=== 2010 event ===
In 2010 the event was held on Sunday 9 May, beginning at 1:00pm, following a race between schoolchildren (won by the Durham crew). It was moved from the Saturday to get better spectator numbers. The Boat Race was a draw, with Newcastle taking both the Freshmen's and Freshwomen's races and Durham both Senior races.

=== 2011 & 2012 events ===
The 2011 boat race was scheduled to take place on Saturday 7 May 2011 at 5pm. There had been tensions between the teams the previous year, and the weekend before, all four Newcastle boats (Men's senior eights & Freshmen and Women's senior eights & Freshwomen) had beaten their Durham counterparts in finals at the BUCS (British Universities and Colleges Sport) Regatta held at Nottingham. Durham declined to challenge Newcastle for the Boat Race trophies and conceded all races for this year without a contest. Newcastle therefore retained the overall trophy. In 2012, Durham again declined to challenge, leading to the event being abandoned until revived in 2015.

=== 2015 event ===
In 2015, the race was held on Saturday 9 May. Durham won both Women's and Men's Beginner races by 1 1/4 lengths and a canvas respectively. Newcastle Senior Women fought back with a win by 2 lengths, setting up a decider between the Senior Men. Newcastle won the Senior Men's race by 3 lengths. Newcastle retained the trophy.

=== 2016 event ===
The 2016 race took place on 7 May 2016. In addition to the four main races, there was also a race between the men's and women's 2nd eights as well as race between local rivals Tyne Rowing Club and Tyne United Rowing Club.

Newcastle's Women won their 1st and 2nd eight races by 2 ¾ and 4 lengths respectively and Newcastle's Men won their 1st and 2nd eight races by 2 ¼ and 2 ¾ lengths respectively. Durham won both the Women's and Men's beginner races by 2 ¾ lengths and ¼ lengths respectively. Therefore, Newcastle won overall.

In the club competition, Tyne Rowing Club beat Tyne United Rowing Club.

=== 2018 event ===
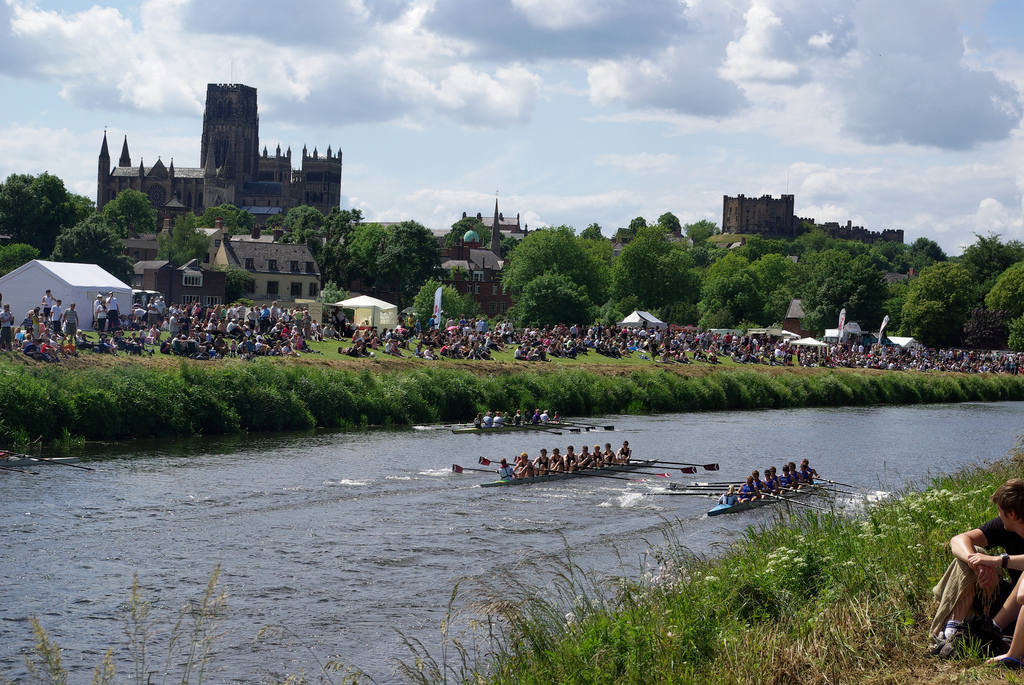
Rowing at Durham Regatta, which hosted the 2018 Boat Race of the North

The 2018 race was scheduled for 17 March 2018 but bad weather forced the event to be postponed. A reduced Boat Race, featuring only the senior men's and women's teams, took place alongside the Durham Regatta on 9 June, meaning that the race took place on the River Wear for the first time in its history. Newcastle won both races to retain the overall trophy, the men's team by three feet and the women's team by 1 ¾ lengths.

=== 2019 event ===
The 2019 event took place on the same day as the Heineken Cup final for European club rugby at St James' Park, with the "fanzone" for the rugby being located at the quayside. Large screens broadcast both the rising and the rugby to the crowds. Newcastle won all six races over a 1500m course from Redheugh Bridge to the Millennium Bridge. Beginner races were replaced by 3rd eights.

=== 2021 event ===
The race was not held in 2020 due to the COVID-19 pandemic but resumed in 2021. Newcastle again won all six races.

=== 2022 event ===
The 2022 races took place on 9 May 2022. Durham won the men's senior 8 race for the first time since the race was revived in 2015, and also took the women's 2nd 8 title, but the remaining four races were won by Newcastle, who took overall victory and retained the trophy.

=== 2023 event ===
The Boat Race of the North in 2023 was held on Newcastle & Gateshead Quayside from 2pm on Saturday 6 May after the coronation of King Charles III. Newcastle University were once again victorious, retaining the title by winning 5 of the 6 races.

=== 2024 event ===
The 2024 event was cancelled.

== Results ==
Year	Race Number	Senior 8 - Men	Senior 8 - Women	2nd 8 - Men	2nd 8 - Women	3rd 8 - Men (Note: Beginner 8 for races until 2017)	3rd 8 - Women	Overall
2024								Cancelled - Newcastle retain trophy
2023	22	Durham	Newcastle	Newcastle	Newcastle	Newcastle	Newcastle	Newcastle Win
2022	21	Durham	Newcastle	Newcastle	Durham	Newcastle	Newcastle	Newcastle Win
2021	20	Newcastle	Newcastle	Newcastle	Newcastle	Newcastle	Newcastle	Newcastle Win
2020 (Note: Not contested due to the COVID-19 pandemic)								Cancelled - Newcastle retain trophy
2019	19	Newcastle	Newcastle	Newcastle	Newcastle	Newcastle	Newcastle	Newcastle Win
2018 (Note: Postponed due to bad weather; rescheduled on the River Wear alongside Durham Regatta in a reduced format with only senior crews participating)	18	Newcastle	Newcastle					Newcastle Win
2017	17	Newcastle	Newcastle	Newcastle	Newcastle	Newcastle	Durham	Newcastle Win
2016	16	Newcastle	Newcastle	Newcastle	Newcastle	Durham	Durham	Newcastle Win
2015	15	Newcastle	Newcastle			Durham	Durham	Draw - Newcastle retain trophy
2014 (Note: Durham chose not to contest the trophies)								Not contested - Newcastle retain trophy
2013								Not contested - Newcastle retain trophy
2012								Not contested - Newcastle retain trophy
2011								Not contested - Newcastle retain trophy
2010	14	Durham	Durham			Newcastle	Newcastle	Draw - Newcastle retain trophy
2009	13	Newcastle	Newcastle			Newcastle	Durham	Newcastle Win
2008	12	Durham	Durham			Durham	Durham	Durham Win
2007	11	Newcastle	Durham			Durham	Newcastle	Draw - Durham retain Trophy
2006	10	Durham	Durham			Newcastle	Durham	Durham Win
2005	9	Newcastle	Durham			Durham	Newcastle	Draw - Durham retain Trophy
2004	8	Durham	Durham			Durham	Durham	Durham Win
2003 (Note: Event cancelled due to bad weather)	7						Newcastle	Cancelled - Durham retain Trophy
2002	6	Durham	Durham			Newcastle	Durham	Durham Win
2001	5	Durham	Newcastle			Durham		Durham Win
2000	4							Cancelled - Durham retain Trophy
1999	3	Durham	Newcastle			Durham		Durham Win
1998	2	Durham	Durham			Newcastle		Durham Win
1997	1	Durham	Durham			Durham		Durham Win
Totals		Durham 10; Newcastle 9	Newcastle 10; Durham 9	Newcastle 5 Durham 0	Newcastle 4 Durham 1	Durham 9 Newcastle 10	Durham 8 Newcastle 8	Durham 8 Newcastle 8; 4 draws

== See also ==
- List of British and Irish varsity matches
- The Boat Race
- The Welsh Boat Race
- University rowing in the United Kingdom
