= Newcastle University Boat Club =

British rowing club

Coordinates: 54.9798°N 1.7436°W

- Location: Newburn, Newcastle upon Tyne, England
- Home water: River Tyne
- Founded: 1911
- Affiliations: British Rowing boat code NEW; BUCS
- Website: newcastlerowing.com

Events
- Northumbrian University Boat Race

Newcastle University Boat Club
Medal record

Rowing

Olympic Games

Representing Great Britain
Gold medal – first place	2024 Paris	M8+ James Rudkin, Tom Ford
Gold medal – first place	2024 Paris	W4x Lola Anderson
Gold medal – first place	2004 Athens	M4- Ed Coode
Silver medal – second place	2008 Beijing	M8+ Alastair Heathcote
Bronze medal – third place	2024 Paris	W8+ Emily Ford
Bronze medal – third place	2020 Tokyo	M8+ James Rudkin, Tom Ford

World Championships

Representing Great Britain
Gold medal – first place	2023 Belgrade	M8+ James Rudkin, Tom Ford
Gold medal – first place	2022 Racice	M8+ James Rudkin, Tom Ford
Gold medal – first place	2022 Racice	M4- Will Stewart
Gold medal – first place	2001 Lucerne	M4- Ed Coode
Gold medal – first place	1999 St Catherines	M4- Ed Coode
Silver medal – second place	2010 Karapiro	LTAMix4+ Kate Jones
Bronze medal – third place	2023 Belgrade	W4x Lola Anderson
Bronze medal – third place	2022 Racice	W4x Lola Anderson
Bronze medal – third place	2019 Linz	M8+ James Rudkin, Tom Ford
Bronze medal – third place	2018 Plovdiv	M8+ James Rudkin
Bronze medal – third place	2018 Plovdiv	M4- Tom Ford
Bronze medal – third place	2007 Munich	M8+ Alastair Heathcote
Bronze medal – third place	2003 Milan	M8+ Ed Coode
Bronze medal – third place	1997 Aiguebelette	M4+ Ed Coode

European Championships

Representing Great Britain
Gold medal – first place	2024 Szeged	M8+ James Rudkin, Tom Ford
Gold medal – first place	2024 Szeged	W4x Lola Anderson
Gold medal – first place	2023 Bled	M8+ James Rudkin, Tom Ford
Gold medal – first place	2022 Munich	M8+ James Rudkin, Tom Ford
Gold medal – first place	2022 Munich	M4- Will Stewart
Gold medal – first place	2022 Munich	W4x Lola Anderson
Gold medal – first place	2021 Varese	M8+ James Rudkin, Tom Ford
Silver medal – second place	2023 Szeged	W8+ Emily Ford
Silver medal – second place	2023 Bled	W8+ Emily Ford
Silver medal – second place	2022 Munich	W8+ Emily Ford
Silver medal – second place	2022 Munich	W2- Emily Ford
Silver medal – second place	2019 Lucerne	M8+ James Rudkin, Tom Ford
Silver medal – second place	2018 Glasgow	M4- Tom Ford

World U23 Championships

Representing Great Britain
Gold medal – first place	2024 St Catherines	W2- Holly Youd
Gold medal – first place	2022 Varese	M4+ Bruce Turnell
Gold medal – first place	2019 Sarasota	M8+ Will Stewart
Gold medal – first place	2019 Sarasota	W4x Lola Anderson
Gold medal – first place	2016 Rotterdam	LM4x Ollie Varley
Gold medal – first place	2000 Copenhagen	W2- Ros Carslake
Silver medal – second place	2022 Varese	W8+ Sam Shuker
Silver medal – second place	2019 Sarasota	M4+ Cormac Molloy
Silver medal – second place	2018 Poznan	M8+ Will Stewart
Silver medal – second place	2016 Rotterdam	W8+ Sasha Adwani
Silver medal – second place	2016 Rotterdam	W8+ Emily Ford
Silver medal – second place	2016 Rotterdam	M4- James Rudkin
Silver medal – second place	2014 Varese	W8+ Nicole Lamb
Silver medal – second place	2013 Linz	W8+ Nicole Lamb
Silver medal – second place	2005 Amsterdam	LM4x Stephen Feeney
Silver medal – second place	1996 Hazewinkel	M4+ Ed Coode
Bronze medal – third place	2015 Plodviv	W8+ Nicole Lamb
Bronze medal – third place	2015 Plodviv	W4- Emily Ford
Bronze medal – third place	2013 Linz	LW4x Gemma Hall
Bronze medal – third place	2012 Trakai	M4- George Rossiter
Bronze medal – third place	2011 Amsterdam	M8+ George Rossiter
Bronze medal – third place	2007 Stratchlyde	M4+ George Laughton

Representing Ireland
Silver medal – second place	2018 Poznan	LM4x Ryan Ballentine
Bronze medal – third place	2019 Sarasota	LM4x Ryan Ballentine

European U23 Championships

Representing Great Britain
Gold medal – first place	2021 Kruszwica	M8+ Freddie Allinson
Silver medal – second place	2023 Krefeld	M8+ Ben Brockway
Silver medal – second place	2017 Kruszwica	M8+ Will Stewart, Alex Haynes
Bronze medal – third place	2021 Kruszwica	M4+ Bruce Turnell
Bronze medal – third place	2019 Ioannina	M8+ Daniel Graham, David Willcox, Freddie Allinson, Freddie Strawson

World University Championships

Representing Great Britain
Gold medal – first place	2018 Shangaii	M8+ James Robson
Gold medal – first place	2018 Shangaii	W8+ Nathasha Harris - White
Gold medal – first place	2018 Shangaii	W4- Nathasha Harris - White
Gold medal – first place	2016 Poznan	M8+ Tim Clarke
Gold medal – first place	2016 Poznan	M4- Oli Knight, Tom Ford
Gold medal – first place	2014 Gravelines	M8+ Sam Arnot, Tim Clarke, Tom Ford, George Rossiter
Gold medal – first place	2010 Szeged	M8+ Henry Pelly, Fred Gill, Stephen Feeney
Gold medal – first place	2006 Trakai	M2x Henry Pelly, George Laughton
Silver medal – second place	2018 Shangaii	W2- Frances Russell
Silver medal – second place	2014 Gravelines	LW2x Gemma Hall
Silver medal – second place	2012 Kazan	M8+ Ed Ford, Tim Clarke
Bronze medal – third place	2014 Gravelines	LM4- Nicholas Buckle
Bronze medal – third place	2008 Belgrade	M4+ George Laughton
Bronze medal – third place	2008 Belgrade	M2- Mason Durant, Fred Gill

Australian Youth Olympics

Representing Great Britain
Gold medal – first place	2012 Sydney	W4- Nicole Lamb
Silver medal – second place	2013 Sydney	W2- Nicole Lamb
Bronze medal – third place	2013 Sydney	W8+ Nicole Lamb

Commonwealth Rowing Championships

Representing England
Gold medal – first place	2014 Strathclyde	(Multiple) Gemma Hall
Gold medal – first place	2014 Strathclyde	(Multiple) Nicholas Buckle
Silver medal – second place	2014 Strathclyde	(Multiple) Emily Ford

Representing Northern Ireland
Silver medal – second place	2006 Stratchlyde	M2x Richard Francis

Newcastle University Boat Club (NUBC) is the rowing club of Newcastle University, UK. Established in March 1911 as the boat club for Armstrong College, it celebrated its centenary in 2011, when was also appointed High Performance Programme for heavyweight men and women by British Rowing. In the past 20 years current students and alumni won 60 international vests for GB.

== Training facilities ==
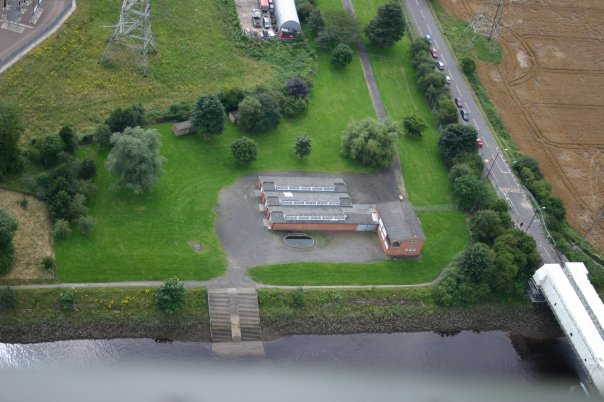
The club's private training facility in Newburn. The facilities have since been refurbished and an additional boathouse has been built.

The club trains on the River Tyne from a purpose-built boathouse on the south bank of the river in the village of Newburn, five miles upriver from the centre of Newcastle upon Tyne. Built in the 1950s, the boathouse is home to the clubs boats, private single sculls and coaching launches; was redeveloped with work finished in 2011. Rowers have access to 35 km (22 mi) of tidal water, extending from the picturesque parkland around Wylam, through the former industrial heartland of the city to Tynemouth. Whilst most training takes place along the Wylam, Newburn and Blaydon stretches of river, extended paddles offers crews the opportunity to row under the famous Tyne Bridge on Newcastle's quayside.

Land training takes place at two sites within the city itself. The club uses the University Sports centre in Newcastle and Sports ground at Longbenton, with Concept2 rowing ergometers, RowPerfect and Concept2 Dyno machines and a fully stocked free weights suite. The club also has use of the university's main sports centre, with access to further rowing machines, weights facilities, fitness suite and sports halls for circuit training. Through the university's performance sports programme, elite rowers get access to free physiotherapy, sports massage, nutritional expertise and strength and conditioning coaching.

== Boathouse refurbishment ==
The club's current boathouse was built in 1953, and by 2009 was in a poor state of repair. Additionally, the growth of the club since 2005 meant that storage space was at a premium and expansion of existing boat racking was essential. In late-2009 the decision was taken by the university to commit £500,000 to a complete refurbishment of the building. When completed, the new facility will have brand new changing/showering facilities, warm-up/stretching area, kitchen and video analysis/meeting room. The existing boat storage area will be refitted with new sliding racks and a dedicated maintenance bay will be created. An additional boat shed has been constructed next to the current building, and it was completed in 2011.

== Staff ==
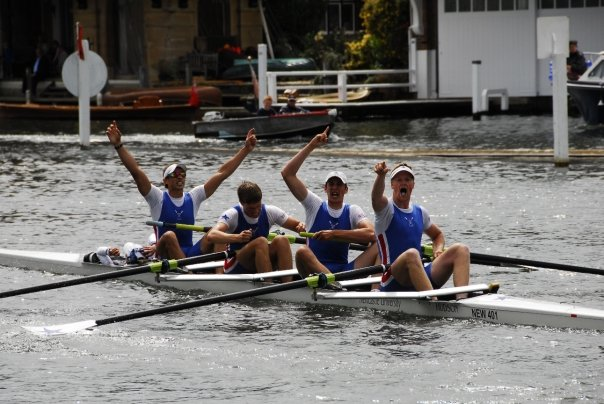
Newcastle University Boat Club winning the Prince Albert Challenge Cup at Henley Royal Regatta in 2008.

Italian coach, Angelo Savarino was appointed Head Coach of the club in 2005. Since then he has overseen a remarkable transformation of the club, with highlights including winning the Prince Albert Challenge Cup at Henley Royal Regatta in 2008, 2013 and 2017 and placing seventh at the Head of the River Race. The club has been a consistently strong performer at the British University and Colleges Sport Regatta, placing second overall in 2012. The club also employs women's head coach Alex Leigh, and assistant men's coach Julian Egan-Shuttler. The club also relies on a strong network of experienced volunteer coaches.

== History ==
=== Founding ===
In 1904, Armstrong College was founded in Newcastle upon Tyne to teach physical sciences. At this time it was part of Durham University and the boat club – established in March 1911 – held the same status as other Durham colleges and competed in intercollegiate events. One of the first races was against the varsity third crew, who they beat and whose place they subsequently took at Durham Regatta. In 1924, a women's club was established and in 1929, the growing success of the club prompted to construction of a new boathouse on the River Tyne at Stella Haugh, the site of the Battle of Newburn.

== The Boat Race of the North ==
The Boat Race of the North is an annual challenge between the universities of Durham and Newcastle in a similar vein to the more famous Oxbridge Boat Race. It is now in its 15th year (2015). Although the event has been traditionally dominated by Durham, the Newcastle team were the overall winners for the first time in 2009, and retained the trophy since. The event is held annually on the River Tyne in central Newcastle upon Tyne in May and is well supported by local spectators. The event comprises four races: Men's Championship 8, Women's Championship 8, Men's Novice 8 and Women's Novice 8. The overall event winners are the university winning at least three races (a draw, with two races won each, leads to retention of the trophy by the previous year's winner). The 2010 races took place on 9 May. Both universities won two races: the event was therefore drawn and Newcastle retained the trophy. From 2011 to 2014 the event resulted in a forfeit to Newcastle University as Durham University declined to race. The Boat Race was back again in 2015 with Newcastle winning the two Championship events, and Durham the two Novices, with Newcastle retaining the trophy. In 2016, two new events were added: men's and women's reserves, Newcastle winning the two championship and reserve events, and Durham the two Novices. Newcastle won the trophy.

== National and international achievements ==
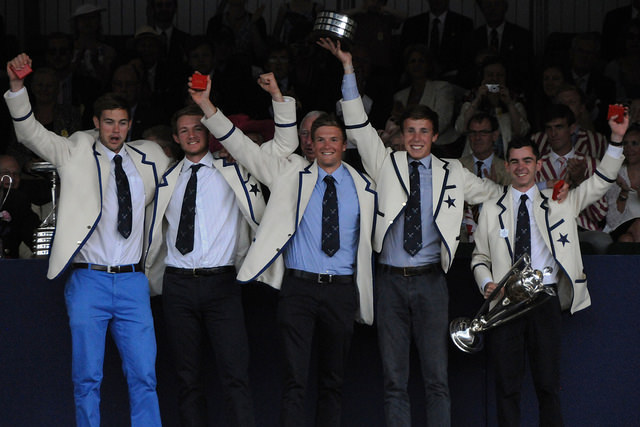
Prince Albert Challenge Cup Winners 2014

Since 1996 Newcastle students have been competing and medalling at the U23, Senior and University World Championships and other International Competitions such European Universities Championships, Duisburg Regatta, Memorial Paolo d'Aloja Regatta and Essen Regatta, with victories as well in UK at National Championships, Marlow Regatta, pennants in the Head of the River Race and Women's Eights Head of the River Race, wins at Henley Women's Regatta and at Henley Royal Regatta.

The Club won the Victor Ludorum at the British University Sports Association (BUCS) Regatta in 2016 and 2018, having been runners-up in 2007, 2008, 2009, and 2012. The 2008 BUCS Regatta saw NUBC winning 4 out of 7 heavyweight events. NUBC came third in V.L. in 2010. In the 2011 BUCS regatta, the Newcastle men were winners in the Championship eight, coxed four and pair, and retained the Championship eight and pair titles in 2012.

Athletes from the club have recently and consistently won medals at World University Championships and U23 World Championships.

== Honours ==
=== Henley Royal Regatta (HRR) and (HWR) ===
Event	Regatta	Winning Year	Winning Crew
Championship Quadruple Sculls. The Borne Cup.	HWR	2018	N. Lamb, A. Bowman, L. Anderson, F. Russell
Championship Lightweight Single Sculls. The George Innes Cup.	HWR	2018	F. Chestnutt,
The Prince Albert Challenge Cup	HRR	2017	W.New, A.Haynes, J.Robson, W.Stewart, A.Turner cox
Senior Coxless Fours. The Frank Harry V Cup.	HWR	2017	E. Ford, L. Anderson, F. Russell, N. Lamb
Academic Eights. The Colgan Foundation Cup	HWR	2017	K. Woolley, L. Knight, K. Eccles, A. van der Braak, C. Dobson, S. Denton-Chandler, P. Truett, L. Stanhope, C. Hill cox
Academic Eights The Sharp Cup	HWR	2016	H.Roddy, L.Davis, I. Leigh, H. Brackenbury, C.Browne, R.Bennewith, B.Mullan, R.Price, E.Wood cox
Elite Coxless Fours The Avril Vellacott Cup	HWR	2015	E.Ford (composite crew)
The Prince Albert Challenge Cup	HRR	2014	J.Holst, T.Ford, J.Rudkin, S.Arnot, C.McRoberts cox
Elite Lightweight Quad Sculls The Rankine Trophy	HWR	2014	G.Hall (composite crew)
Senior Coxed Fours The Frank Harry Cup	HWR	2013	N.Lamb, N.Hardy, N. Hardy, R.Rust, L.Dobson cox
Elite Quad Sculls The Borne Cup	HWR	2013	G.Hall (composite crew)
Elite Lightweight Quad Sculls The Rankine Trophy	HWR	2013	G.Hall (composite crew)
Senior Eights The GP Jeffreis Cup	HWR	2012	N.Lamb, I.Vyvyan, P. Neill, G.Hall, H.Broad, C.Irving, G.Parry, R.Rust, L.Dobson cox
Academic Eights The Pricewaterhouse Coopers Cup	HWR	2009	L.Woods, E.Field, R.Skarra, M.Flaate, A.Wilson, A.Hodges, M.Jones-Walters, E.Earp, R.Macphee cox
The Prince Albert Challenge Cup	HRR	2008	N.O'Reilly, M.Wilkojc, M.Durant, F.Gill, C.Johnson cox
Intermediate College Coxed Fours	HWR	1995	R.Ingledew, R.Turner, E.Ogren, J.Maguire, J.Knight cox

=== National champions ===
Year	Winning crew/s
1997	Men 4+
2000	Women 2-
2007	Women U23 2x
2008	Open U23 1x, Women U23 2x
2009	Open U23 2x, Women U23 1x
2010	Open U23 2x
2011	Open Ltw4-, Open U23 2x
2012	Open Ltw2-, Open 4+

== Notable members ==
- Lola Anderson
- Ed Coode
- Emily Ford
- Tom Ford
- Fred Gill
- Alastair Heathcote
- Henry Pelly
- James Rudkin
- James Robson
- Daniel Graham
- Will Stewart

== See also ==
- University rowing (UK)
