= Scottish Rowing =

Governing body for rowing in Scotland

- Sport: Rowing
- Abbreviation: formerly SARA
- Headquarters: Strathclyde Park, North Lanarkshire
- President: Mike Martin

Official website
- www.scottish-rowing.org.uk
- (Scotland)

Scottish Rowing (SR), formerly the Scottish Amateur Rowing Association, is the governing body for the sport of rowing in Scotland. It is responsible for promoting the sport in Scotland and also for selecting crews to send to the Home International Regatta and the Commonwealth Rowing Championships. In addition, Scottish Rowing also runs three of the major regattas of the year, Strathclyde Park Regatta, the Scottish Rowing Championships and the Scottish Indoor Rowing Championships.

== Affiliated clubs ==
- Aberdeen Boat Club
- Aberdeen Schools Rowing Association
- Aberdeen University Boat Club
- Castle Semple Rowing Club
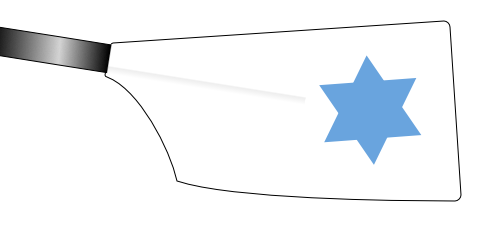
- Clyde Amateur Rowing Club
- Clydesdale Amateur Rowing Club
- Crichton University Campus Boat Club
- Dundee University Boat Club
- Edinburgh University Boat Club
- George Heriots School Rowing Club
- George Watsons College Rowing Club
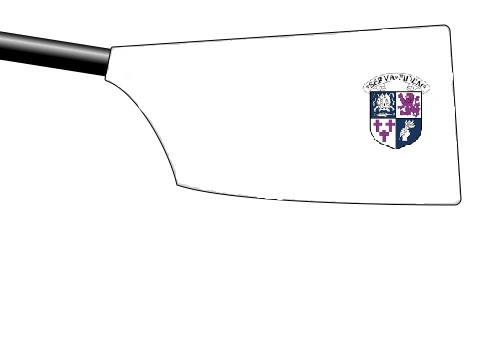
- Glasgow Academy Boat Club
- Glasgow Rowing Club
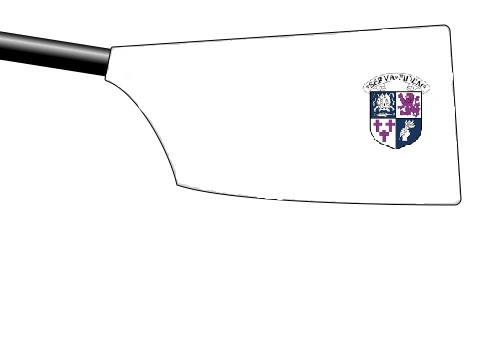
- Glasgow Schools Rowing Club
- Glasgow University Boat Club
- Heriot-Watt University Boat Club
- Inverness Rowing Club
- Loch Lomond Rowing Club
- Nithsdale Amateur Rowing Club
- Robert Gordon University Boat Club
- St Andrew Boat Club
- Stirling Rowing Club
- Stirling University Boat Club
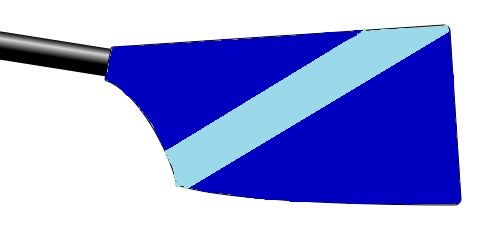
- Strathclyde Park Rowing Club
- Strathclyde University Boat Club
- Tay Rowing Club
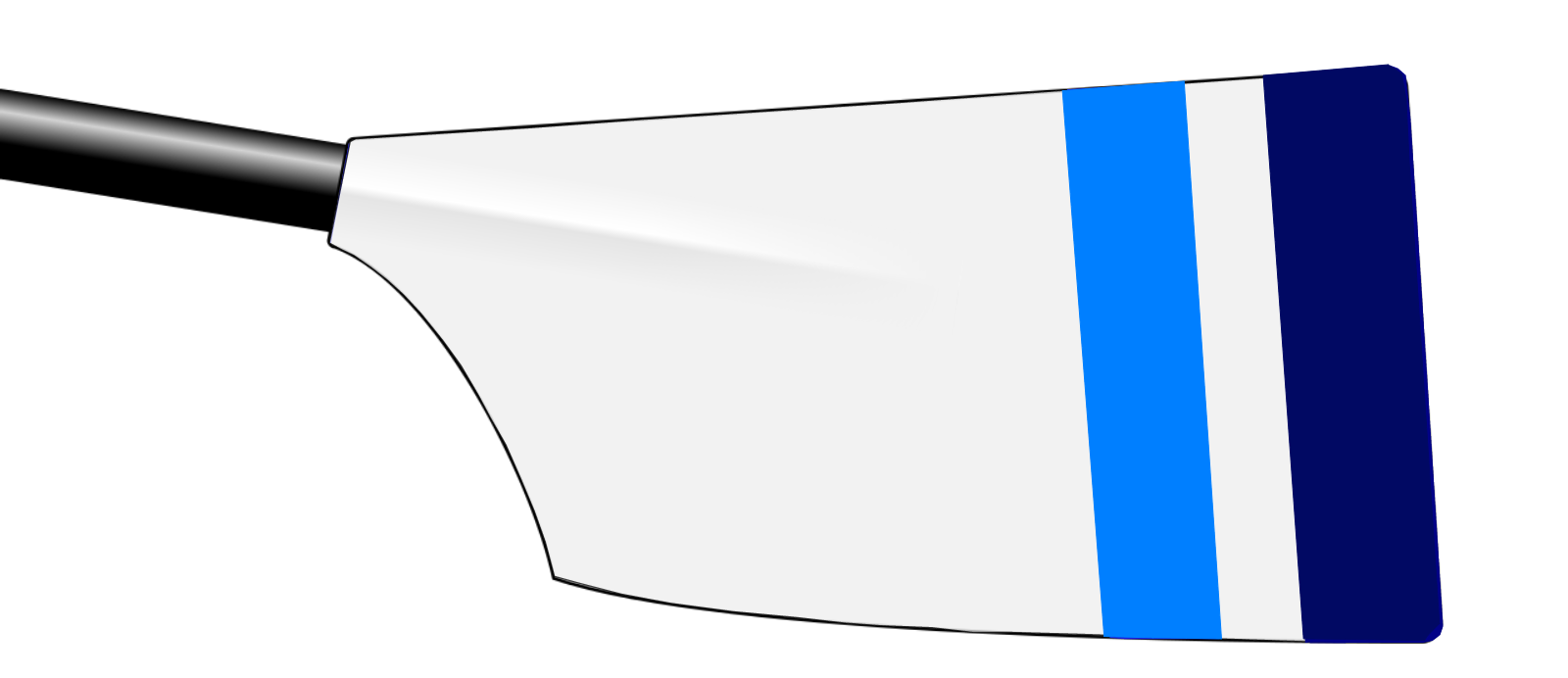
- University of St Andrews Boat Club

== Categories ==
=== Senior ===
Within the senior category of racing, depending on the average number of racing points of the crew, or the number of points of the rower (1x), a rower may compete in a number of categories: Novice (0 wins), Restricted 2 (up to 2 points), Restricted 1 (up to 6 points), Open (up to 12 points, the maximum).

=== Junior ===
There are a number of junior categories (J12, J13, J14, J15, J16, J17 and J18). The number represents the age competitors must be less than before the first day of September preceding the event.

=== Masters ===
A rower is eligible to compete at masters level from the year in which they turn 27 years old. Once a rower turns 27 they can race in the category Masters A, the categories change as the crew age increases (Mas B - 36; Mas C - 43; Mas D - 50; Mas E - 55; Mas F - 60; Mas G - 65; Mas H - 70; Mas I - 75; Mas J - 80+).

=== Lightweight ===
A lightweight male is one whose individual weight does not exceed 72.5 kg (average crew weight 70 kg) and a lightweight female is one whose individual weight does not exceed 59 kg (average crew weight 57.5 kg).

== Performance Programme ==
Scottish Rowing, funded by sportscotland, invests into a number of university-based rowing programmes with a view to supporting the development of talented Under 23 rowers.

The universities on this programme have made a commitment to work in partnership with Scottish Rowing to establish a high performance programme led by a full-time professional rowing coach and supported by first class support services.

Admission to the rowing programme at these universities is based on merit and entry is not exclusively restricted to students. A significant focus of the rowing programme is on talent identification and development working closely with the GB Rowing Team Start programme.

Currently Scottish Rowing invests in the following university rowing programmes:

- University of Aberdeen / Robert Gordon University
- University of Edinburgh
- University of Glasgow
