= Aberdeen Schools Rowing Association =

Scottish rowing club

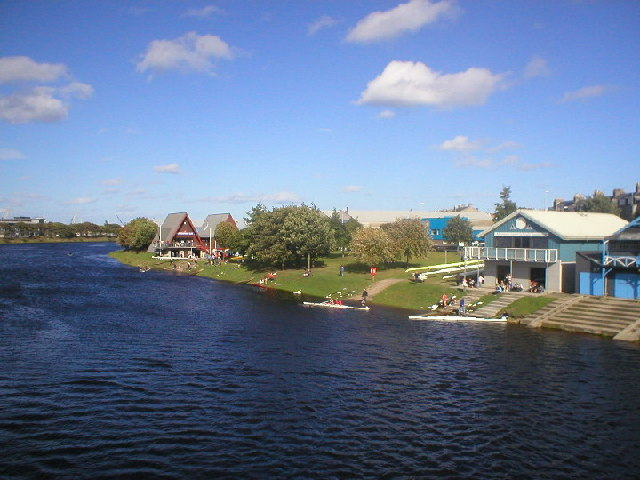

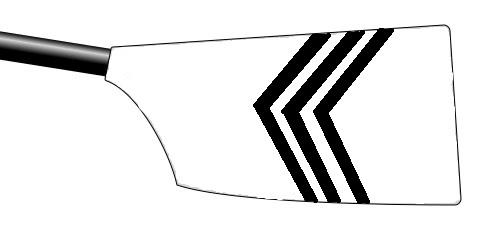
- Location: South Esplanade West, Torry, Aberdeen, Scotland
- Coordinates: 57.136367°N 2.094108°W
- Home water: River Dee, Aberdeenshire
- Founded: 1960
- Key people: Holly Reid (Head Coach); Michel Dearsley (Assistant Coach); Peter Turner (Rowing Coordinator); Alan Lawrie (Treasurer)
- Membership: c. 100 (2011)
- Affiliations: Scottish Rowing, Committee of the Dee, KRSG (Belgium)
- Website: www.asra-rowing.org.uk

Events
- Aberdeen Inter-Schools Regatta (ASRA); Aberdeen 4s & Small Boats Head of the River; Aberdeen 8s Head of the River; Aberdeen Sprint Regatta; North-East Regatta

Aberdeen Schools Rowing Association (ASRA) was founded in 1960 by Robert Newton and Bryan Steel. It thrives today on the banks of the River Dee, Aberdeen, in Scotland. The club is affiliated to Scottish Rowing.

== History ==
ASRA has been very successful in National competitions since 1960 and has won medals at three major competitions in Britain.

In 1984, during the Aberdeen Boat Club's annual regatta, two association boats containing pupils from the Hazlehead Academy sunk.

In 2007 ASRA was awarded a grant from the Big Lottery Fund which allowed ASRA to employ their first paid coach, purchase boats for beginners, ergometers for schools and a minibus and towing vehicle. ASRA is expanding and hoping to build an extension to the current boathouse which was constructed in 2001. This is due to the huge increase in members due to the success of the "Wet Start" and "Dry Start" schemes.

ASRA is run by 3 trustees: Alan Lawrie, Robert Newton and James Steel. They oversee the running of the club. Holly Reid is the Head Coach at the club, supported by Michel Dearsley and a team of volunteer coaches, many are parents and/or ASRA FPs. Holly has been coaching at ASRA since 2012 and became a paid coach in 2021. In 2024, Holly was named as Scottish Rowing's Performance Coach of the Year, shortlisted for the Scottish Women in Sport Coach of the Year, and nominated for Sport Scotland's Coach of the Year. ASRA FP Colin Wallace was the first full-time paid coach and was employed by ASRA from 2007 to 2012. When Colin moved off to Edinburgh to train as a PE teacher, he was replaced by Sportscotland appointee, Jonny Muir, whose daunting remit it was, firstly to encourage more of ASRA's top rowers to follow the GB pathway, secondly to increase participation at all age levels in the club and thirdly to try to cut back the high levels of drop-out in the first years of rowing..

ASRA athletes Penny Irvine, Jem Aspinall, Sophie Sinclair and Charlotte Arthur, coxed by Lily Arthur, won the Groton School Challenge Cup at Henley Women’s Regatta and the Jim Mason Plate at the National Schools Regatta in the Summer of 2024. The ASRA Coxless Pair of Calum Sherwood and Henrik Gundersen won the silver medal in the Nick Bevan Cup for Championship Coxless Pairs in that same year. Jem went on to row for Great Britain at the Coupe de la Jeunesse in Račice, Czech Republic in the Junior Women's Coxless Four. Penny represented Great Britain in the Under-19s Women's Coxless Pair at the World Championship in St. Catherines, Canada in August 2024. Sophie won Silver Medal in the Under-19 Women's Eight at the same event, rowing for Great Britain..

In 2023, the ASRA Coxed Four of Harris Pearce, Magnus Heidenreich, Sam Doherty, and Murray Bone, coxed by Samuel Cordiner won the Hedsor Challenge Cup at the National Schools Regatta at Eton Dorney, the club’s first victory in a Junior Championship event outside of the Coxless Pair. At Women's Henley in 2022, the ASRA Women's Coxed Four of Maisie Aspinall, Zoe Beeson, Rosie Wilson and Freya Hughson, coxed by Lily Arthur won the Groton School Challenge Cup at Henley Women’s Regatta. From that boat, Maisie and Zoe won the Leander Cup for Championship Coxless Pairs at the National Schools Regatta in May 2022, a title they retained from the 2021 regatta. Both athletes went on to be selected to row for Great Britain in the Women's Coxless Four at the Under-19 World Championships in Varese, Italy.

ASRA athletes Miles Beeson and Robert Powell were selected to compete for Great Britain in the 2- event at the 2018 World Rowing Junior Championships in Račice, Czech Republic and ranked 7th overall by winning the B Final. In 2019, the feat was repeated in the Women's 2- at the 2019 World Rowing Junior Championships in Tokyo Bay, Japan by ASRA athletes Abagail Topp and Megan Hewison.

== Honours ==
=== British champions ===
| Year | Winning crew/s |
|---|---|
| 1994 | Men J18 4+ |
| 1997 | Women J18 8+, Women J16 4+ |
| 1999 | Men J18 4+, Women J18 2-, Women J18 4+ |
| 2001 | Men J18 4- |
| 2002 | Men J18 4+ |
| 2003 | Men J18 4-, Men J18 4+ |
| 2006 | Women J18 2- |
| 2007 | Women J18 4+ |
| 2008 | Women J16 4+ |
| 2009 | Women J18 4+ |
| 2010 | Open J16 2- |
| 2011 | Open J16 1x, Open J16 2-, Women J18 4- |
| 2012 | Open J16 2-, Women J18 4-, Women J18 4+ |
| 2013 | Victor Ludorum, Open J18 4-, Women J18 4- |
| 2014 | Open J16 2-, Open J16 4+ |
| 2016 | Open J18 8+, Open J16 4+ |
| 2017 | Women J16 2- |
| 2019 | Open J18 4-, Open J18 8+, Open J16 4+ |
| 2025 | Open J15 2x, Women J16 2- |

== See also ==
- Scottish Rowing
