= City of Sheffield Rowing Club =

British rowing club

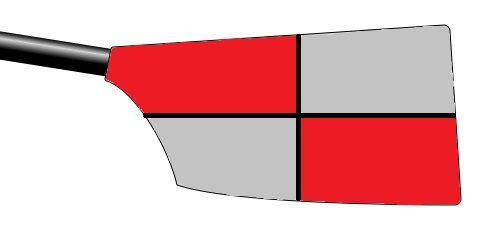
- Location: Damflask Rowing Centre, Damflask Reservoir, Low Bradfield, Sheffield, South Yorkshire, England
- Coordinates: 53.415045°N 1.582120°W
- Founded: 1968
- Affiliations: British Rowing (boat code CSH)
- Website: www.sheffieldrowing.com

City of Sheffield Rowing Club is a rowing club on the Damflask Reservoir, based at the Damflask Rowing Centre, Low Bradfield, Sheffield, South Yorkshire, England and is affiliated to British Rowing.

== History ==
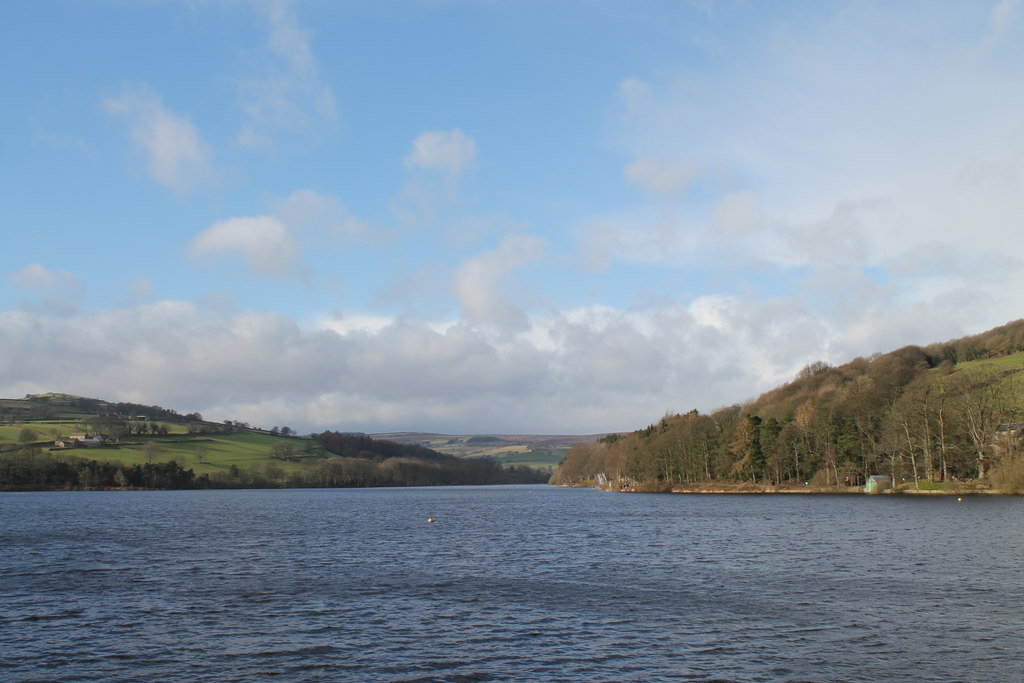
The Damflask Reservoir is the home of the club

The club was founded in 1968 and has produced British champions in 1977 and 1997.

== Honours ==
=== British champions ===
Year	Winning crew/s
1977	Men veteran 4+
1997	Women 1x
