= Prince Albert Challenge Cup =

Rowing competition

- Venue: Henley Royal Regatta, River Thames
- Location: Henley-on-Thames, Oxfordshire
- Dates: 2004 – present

The Prince Albert Challenge Cup is an event at Henley Royal Regatta. It is contested by Men's Student Crews in Coxed fours. It has been held since 2004.

== Creation in 2004 ==
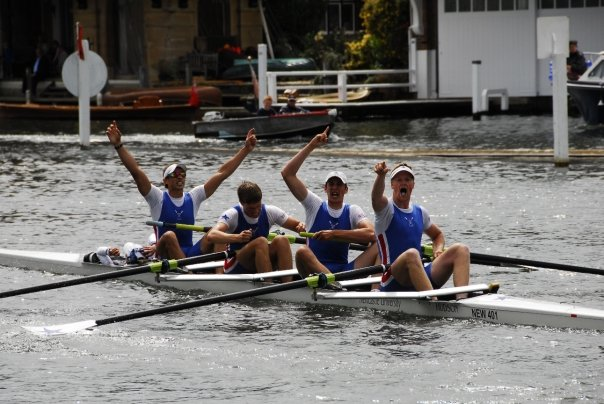
Newcastle University celebrate winning the event in 2008

The Britannia Challenge Cup was originally presented in 1969 as an event for four-oars with coxswain (Coxed Fours) open to club and student crews, and was contested for its first 35 years by an entry of 32 crews, racing over 5 days - with many times its entry number entering qualification and pre-qualifying races.

The Britannia Challenge Cup was split between club and student crews in 2004, having created additional competition time by removing the Prince Philip Challenge Cup, which had been contested by a small entry (usually between 2–4) of international elite oarsmen but was removed from the racing programme in line with the continued removal of coxed fours racing from international regattas meaning that it had lost value.

The Britannia Challenge Cup remained as the club coxed fours' competition, while the Prince Albert Challenge Cup for men's student coxed fours created in a similar mould, but with entry restricted to:

- Universities
- Colleges
- Schools

No composite crews are allowed to enter. The entry for each competition was set at 16 for both cups. There are now coxed fours events for both clubs and universities at the regatta, and both events have been heavily contested since the change meaning qualifying races have been held for the events. The Prince Albert has attracted international competitors from the US, the Netherlands and Ireland.

== The Prince Albert Trophy ==
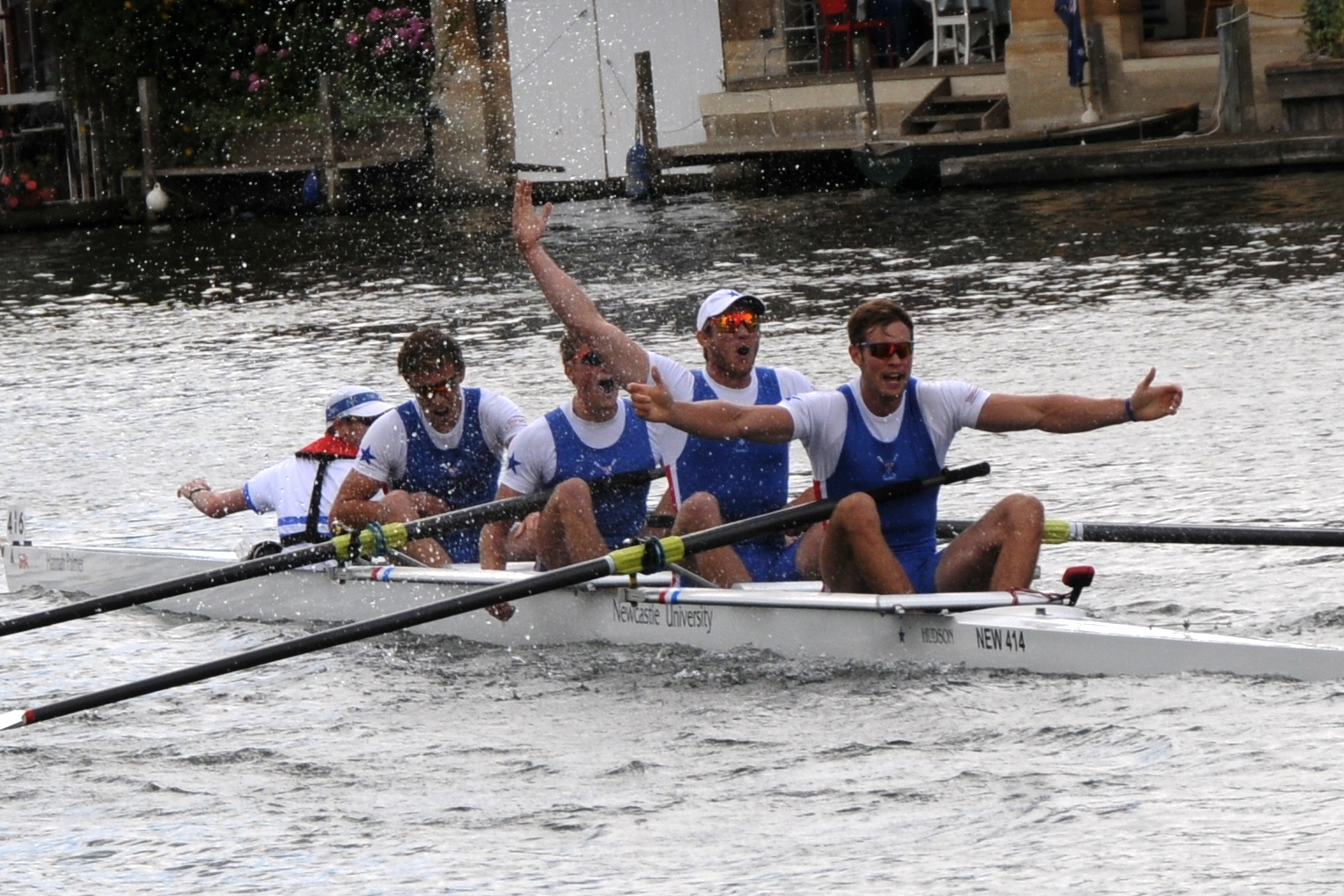
Newcastle University win again in 2014

Given the success of the fledgling Students Coxed Fours event the stewards agreed to accept and to fund a permanent trophy to be awarded to the winners of the event, two years after its start. The trophy was designed and created by Hector Miller and was presented by Imperial College London - the 2004 winners. It is named after Prince Albert who became the first Royal Patron of the Regatta in 1851 and was also closely associated with the origins of Imperial College. The Cup was accepted by the Regatta in the presence of H.M. The Queen at Buckingham Palace in June 2006. As with other competitions at the Royal Regatta the names of the winning crew are inscribed on the trophy.

== Past winners ==
Year	Winner	Winning crew	Runner-up	Ref
2004	Imperial College Boat Club	Simon Hislop, George Whittaker, Hugh Mackenzie, Ed Johnson, Seb Pierce (c)	Isis Boat Club	
2005	Durham University Boat Club	P. Evans, Patrick Thomas, J. Foster, N. Jones, T. Hill (c)	National University of Ireland, Galway	
2006	Imperial College Boat Club	Simon Hislop, Jonty McNuff, Ed Johnson, Ole Tietz, Alison Williams (c)	University of London Boat Club	
2007	University of London Boat Club	Nathaniel Reilly-O'Donnell, Cameron Nichol, Robert Irving, Matt Neame, M. Eldridge (c)	Goldie Boat Club	
2008	Newcastle University Boat Club	Nathan O'Reilly, Murray Wilcojc, Mason Durant, Fred Gill, Carolyn Johnson (c)	University of the West of England Boat Club	
2009	Oxford Brookes University Boat Club	Karl Hudspith, Chris Abraham, Matthew Tarrant, Scott Durant, Hannah Clews (c)	Yale University	
2010	University College Dublin	Tom Doyle, Finbar Manning, Colm Pierce, Dave Neale, cox: Jennie Lynch (c)	University of Bristol	
2011	Harvard University	J.P Hogan, Ben French, Justin Mundt, Peter Scholle, David Fuller (c)	Oxford Brookes University Boat Club	
2012	University of London Boat Club	Jamie Cook, Paul Bennett, Ollie Cook, Rory Buffachi, Max Gander (c)	Newcastle University Boat Club	
2013	Imperial College Boat Club	Jonny Rankin, Henry Goodier, Ben Spencer-Jones, Tim Richards, Ellie Smith (c)	Isis Boat Club	
2014	Newcastle University Boat Club	Jasper Holst, Tom Ford, James Rudkin, Sam Arnot, Calum McRoberts (c)	Harvard University	
2015	University of Washington	Jake Zier, Ed Nainby-Luxmoore, Sean Raffetto, Philip Walczak, Lisa Caldwell (c)	Yale University	
2016	Edinburgh University Boat Club	Rufus Scholefield, Calum Irvine, Kieran Tierney, James Temple, Rosie Margolis (c)	Newcastle University Boat Club	
2017	Newcastle University Boat Club	James Robson, Will New, Alex Haynes, William Stewart, Alex Turner (c)	Imperial College Boat Club	
2018	Imperial College Boat Club	David Simmonds, Oliver Hines, Casper Woods, Alex Ball, Wilf Le Brocq (c)	Goldie Boat Club	
2019	Harvard University	Lucas Clarke, Sam Monkley, Ethan Seder, Pieter Quinton, Ed Bracey (c)	Durham University Boat Club	
2020	No competition due to COVID-19 pandemic			
2021	University of London Boat Club	Isaac Workman, Henry Marles, Tom Worthington, Tom Cross, Jasper Couper (c)	Newcastle University Boat Club	
2022	Oxford Brookes University Boat Club	Jack Prior, Louis Nares, Blaise Ivers-Dreux, Marco Tognazzi, Amie Jones (c)	University of California BC, Berkeley, USA	
2023	Oxford Brookes University Boat Club	Marine Arnerich, Jack Cooper, Dominiko Arnerich, Evan Falstrup, Bakang Zondi (c)	University of Washington BC, USA	
2024	Oxford Brookes 'A'	Charlie Chick, Shay Bradley, Kai Schlottman, Richard Hawes, Sam DeSilva (c)	Oxford Brookes 'B'	
2025	University of London Boat Club	George Lauchlan, Joe Middleton, Theo Doyle, David Wallace, Amelia Cataldi (c)	Edinburgh University	

== Records ==
	Crew	Barrier	Fawley	Finish	Year
Imperial College London		1:55	3:15	6:46	2018
