= Burway Rowing Club =

Rowing club in Surrey, England

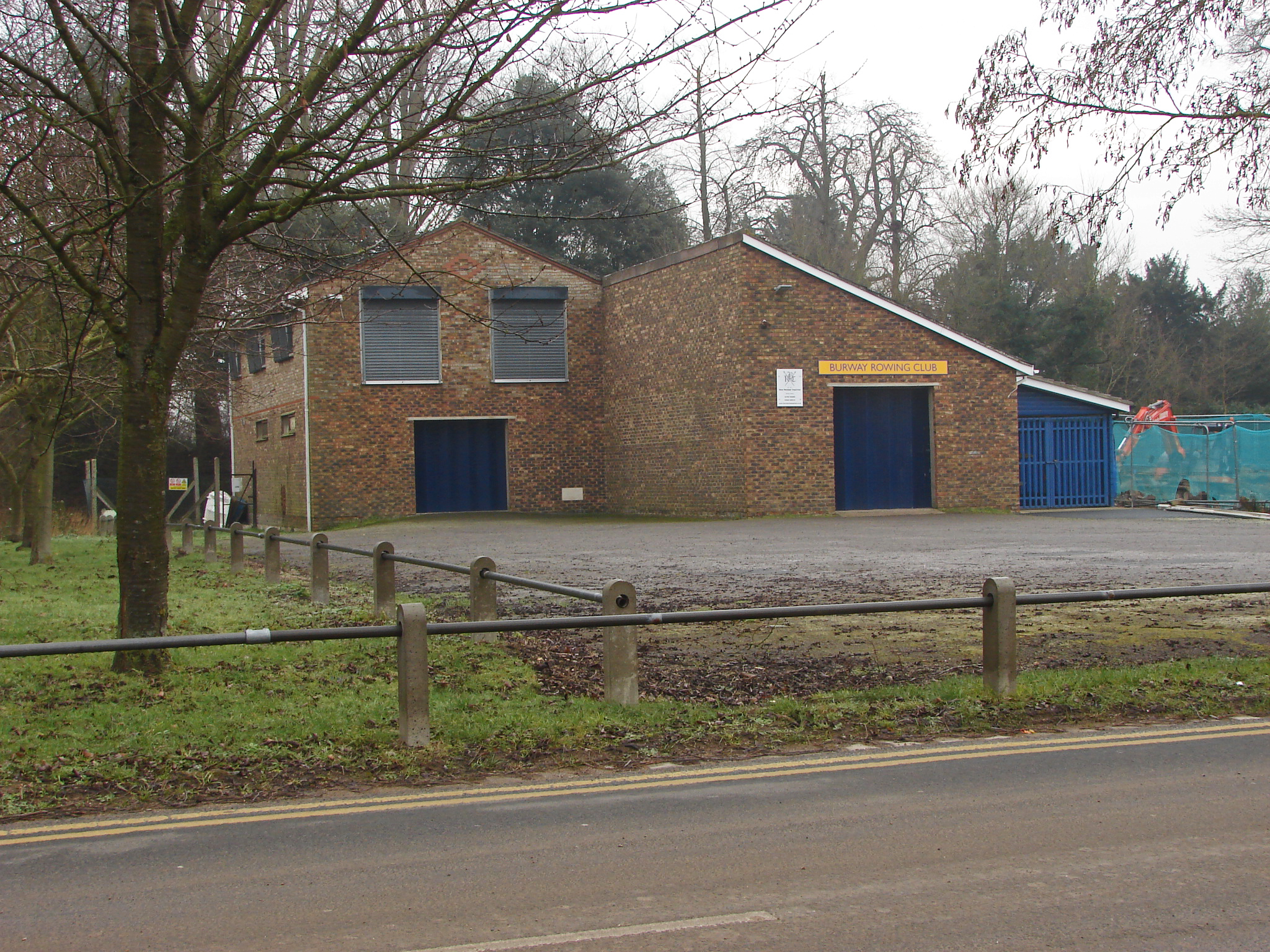

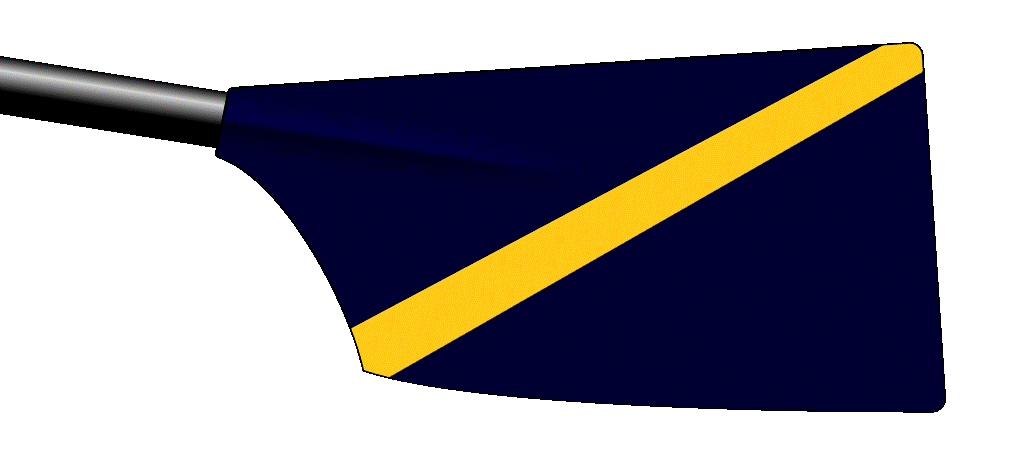
- Location: Thameside, Laleham, Borough of Spelthorne, Surrey, England
- Coordinates: 51.404097°N 0.490109°W
- Founded: 1921
- Affiliations: British Rowing (boat code BUR)
- Website: www.burwayrowingclub.co.uk

Burway Rowing Club is a rowing club on the River Thames, based at Thameside, Laleham, Borough of Spelthorne, Surrey.

The blade colours are dark blue and gold; kit: yellow and dark blue. The boathouse is located next door to the Sir William Perkins's School Boat Club.

== History ==
The club was founded in 1921 as Staines Town Rowing Club. In 1948 the club became known as Burway Rowing Club due to its location at Burway Reach. In the same year the Burway Regatta was introduced.

The club has pre-trained a few British champions at senior level and principally trained many juniors winning their events at that major event, held over 2000 metres, usually in Nottingham: Holme Pierrepoint purpose-built lake.

== Honours ==
=== British champions ===
Year	Winning crew/s
1988	Men J18 2x
1990	Women J14 1x
1997	Women J16 1x
2003	Men J16 1x
2008	Open J14 1x, Women J18 1x

== See also ==
- Rowing on the River Thames
