= Scottish Boat Race =

Annual rowing race in Scotland

The Scottish Boat Race

Event information
- Race area: Below the tidal weir River Clyde, Glasgow
- Dates: 1877, annual since 1919
- Host city: Glasgow
- Competitors: EUBC, GUBC
- Distance: 1.6 miles (2.6 km)

Results
- Winner (2022): Edinburgh

- The Scottish Boat Race Trophy
- Number of wins - Men
Edinburgh	Glasgow
19	27
- Number of wins - Women
Edinburgh	Glasgow
14	8

The Scottish Boat Race, also known as the Edinburgh vs. Glasgow Boat Race, is an annual rowing race between the University of Glasgow and the University of Edinburgh, in competing eights currently held on the River Clyde in Glasgow, Scotland. Started in 1877 on the Clyde above the tidal weir, the Scottish Boat Race has continued regularly since its inception with the exception of 1903 to 1919 due to GURC (as it was known then) being a non-competitive club. The Race was originally contested in coxed fours but this was changed to eights after 1961. It is also believed to be the third oldest university boat race in the world, predated only by the Oxford and Cambridge Boat Race and the Yale-Harvard Regatta. Edinburgh University won the 2016 Scottish Boat Race after winning the Men's Scottish Boat Race, both Beginner crew races, the Women's Reserve race and the Ergometer Challenge.

== Races ==
Originally only the Men's first boats raced but over the years the format of the Race has changed such that now the first and second boats of both genders now race following the inclusion of women into the Race in 1992. Graduates from each university also race albeit over a much shorter course and were started in 2001. The on water races are now followed by the Novice Ergometer Challenge; a team 2 kilometre test on ergometers where a team of four novice rowers from each university race head to head on two ergometers with each team member covering roughly 500m. Previously a Mixed Graduate race had been held between 2001 and 2003. The largest margin of victory was displayed by Edinburgh in 2014, with 15 lengths.

== Course ==
Over its history the race has been contested on several bodies of water; however it has been mostly raced on the River Clyde and the Union Canal in Edinburgh. Other bodies of water used include the Forth and Clyde Canal at Dullatur and Leith Docks. Between 1999 and 2012 the race was run on the Clyde above the tidal weir between Cowans Bend, across which the Dalmarnock Smartbridge now runs, and the Nelson Monument at Glasgow Green. The course was changed in 2013 to start from Broomielaw Quay with the finish in line with the Tall Ship at the Riverside Museum.

== The First Race ==
The first Edinburgh v. Glasgow Boat Race took place shortly after 3:00 pm on Monday 30 July 1877 on the River Clyde above the weir at Glasgow Green in coxed fours and was won by Glasgow by eight lengths. The course was from the railway bridge at Dalmarnock to the St. Andrews suspension bridge at Glasgow Green, the distance being one and three quarter miles, and was deliberately chosen in order to allow the public to spectate; a course between Port Glasgow and Bowling had previously been chosen. The race was staged following discussions between the boat clubs of the respective universities as to creating an annual competition over water supremacy. An estimated crowd of fifty thousand watched the race from both sides of the river.

The Edinburgh crew were W. Weir (9 st 5 lbs) (bowseat), R.L. Murray (9 st 6 lbs) (2-seat), C. Fairburn (12 st 3 lbs) (3-seat), J.H. Balfour (10 st 13 lbs) (strokeseat) and were coxed by R.S. Browne (8 st 4 lbs) and the Glasgow crew were C.D. Johnstone (9 st 6 lbs) (bowseat), G.H. Robbs (10 st 10 lbs) (2-seat), J. Pinkerton (11 st 10 lbs) (3-seat), J. Crerar (10 st 6 lbs) (strokeseat) and were coxed by T.H. Mason (9 st 5 lbs). The oarmen were about equal in weight but Edinburgh's cox was 15 pounds lighter than Glasgow's.

An account of the race from The Evening News and Star:

The weather on Saturday was all that could be desired for a boat race, the wind being light, the water perfectly smooth and though the sky was overcast no rain fell. By two o’clock even it was evident from the Green that something of public interest was about to take place. Shortly after three the hour appointed for starting, some 50,000 spectators were gathered on both sides of the river. Every window which afforded even the most distant view of the river was occupied by a cluster of eager onlookers, and the roofs of the public buildings were all alive. The river was busy with rowing-craft of all descriptions, from the dashing four-oared outrigger to the humble punt- some pulling aimlessly about, others racing as eagerly as if the vast mass of spectators had turned out to expressly to see them. Time went on and as there was no appearance of the boats coming up, the crowd started to show signs of wearying. At last the Edinburgh crew appeared on the scene, and pulling under the bridge, went ashore to rest a little before beginning the race. A few minutes afterwards a steamlaunch with the Glasgow crew aboard came puffing along, and bringing to at the western end of the building-yard landed its passengers, who then embarked in their gig, and paddled slowly up to the starting point. Here they were joined in a few minutes by their opponents, and the excitement of the people rose to a high pitch, which was further increased when the word “Go” was at last given, and both crews catching the water at about the same moment sent their boats off nearly level from a beautiful start. After the first few strokes, Glasgow, who rowed faster, took the lead by nearly half a length and kept in that position till rounding the first bend, where having the disadvantage of the turn, a steering a little too wide, the Edinburgh boat drew up almost level. This position was not long maintained, as no sooner had bend rounded than Glasgow again began to creep ahead and despite the hard tussle of their rivals, soon had half a length to the good. Passing Whites chemical work Edinburgh got a little flurried but Mr Balfour soon had them in trim, and strenuous endeavours were made to cut Glasgow down. The local representatives now began to give the Edinburgh boat their wash, and, putting on a fresh effort, soon made three lengths of a gap to intervene. Mr Balfour, about the centre of Shawfield, again called on his men, and a fresh effort was made to overhaul the leaders. The gap was lessened slightly, when Mr Crerar roused up his crew and was soon on the way doing 40 strokes a minute. At Rutherglen Bridge the real interest of the race was passed as Edinburgh was four lengths behind; and then Glasgow eased up a rowed quietly to the goal, coming in easy victors amid great cheering by fully eight lengths.

== Results ==
Year	Men's 1st VIII	Women's 1st VIII	Men's Reserve VIII	Women's Reserve VIII	Ergometer Challenge	Men's Graduate VIII	Women's Graduate VIII	Mixed Graduate VIII	Men's Beginner VIII	Women's Beginner VIII
1877¤	Glasgow									
1919*	Edinburgh									
1920*	Edinburgh		Edinburgh							
1922*	Edinburgh		Glasgow							
1934*	Edinburgh		Edinburgh							
1935*	Glasgow									
1936*	Glasgow		Edinburgh							
1939*	Glasgow		Edinburgh							
1940	Edinburgh									
1941*	No Race		Edinburgh							
1943*	Race Abandoned due to bad weather									
1944	Glasgow									
1945	Race Cancelled									
1946	Glasgow									
1948	Edinburgh									
1950	Edinburgh		Glasgow							
1951	Glasgow		Glasgow							
1952	Glasgow									
1953	Glasgow									
1954	Edinburgh									
1955	Glasgow		Edinburgh							
1956	Glasgow									
1957	Edinburgh		Edinburgh							
1958	Edinburgh		Edinburgh							
1959	Edinburgh									
1960	Edinburgh		Glasgow							
1961	Edinburgh		Glasgow							
1992‡	Glasgow	Glasgow								
1993‡	Glasgow	Glasgow								
1994‡	Glasgow	Glasgow								
1996‡	Edinburgh	Edinburgh								
1997	Race Cancelled									
1998	Race Cancelled									
1999¤	Edinburgh	Edinburgh	Edinburgh	Glasgow						
2000¤	Glasgow	Edinburgh	Glasgow	Edinburgh						
2001¤	Glasgow	Edinburgh	Edinburgh	Edinburgh		Glasgow	Glasgow	Edinburgh		
2002¤	Glasgow	Glasgow	Glasgow	Edinburgh		Glasgow	Edinburgh	Edinburgh		
2003¤	Glasgow	Edinburgh	Glasgow	Edinburgh		Glasgow	Edinburgh	Edinburgh		
2004¤	Glasgow	Glasgow	Glasgow	Edinburgh		Glasgow	Edinburgh			
2005¤	Glasgow	Edinburgh	Glasgow	Edinburgh		Edinburgh	Edinburgh			
2006¤	Glasgow	Edinburgh	Glasgow	Glasgow		Edinburgh	Glasgow			
2007¤	Glasgow	Edinburgh	Edinburgh	Edinburgh		Edinburgh	Glasgow			
2008¤	Glasgow	Edinburgh	Glasgow	Edinburgh						
2009¤	Glasgow	Edinburgh	Edinburgh	Edinburgh						
2010¤	Glasgow	Edinburgh	Glasgow	Edinburgh						
2011¤	Glasgow	Edinburgh	Edinburgh	Glasgow						
2012¤	Glasgow	Glasgow	Edinburgh	Void						
2013‡	Edinburgh	Edinburgh	Edinburgh	Glasgow	Edinburgh	Glasgow	Glasgow			
2014‡	Edinburgh	Glasgow	Edinburgh	Edinburgh	Edinburgh	Edinburgh	Edinburgh			
2015‡	Edinburgh	Edinburgh	Glasgow	Glasgow	Edinburgh	Glasgow	Edinburgh			
2016‡	Edinburgh	Glasgow	Glasgow	Edinburgh	Edinburgh	Glasgow	Glasgow		Edinburgh	Edinburgh
2017‡	Edinburgh	Edinburgh	Edinburgh	Edinburgh	Edinburgh			Edinburgh	Edinburgh	Edinburgh
2018‡	Edinburgh	Edinburgh	Edinburgh	Edinburgh	Edinburgh			Glasgow	Edinburgh	Edinburgh
2019‡	Edinburgh	Edinburgh	Edinburgh	Edinburgh	Edinburgh			Edinburgh	Edinburgh	Edinburgh
2020	Race Cancelled due to COVID-19 pandemic									
2021	No Race due to COVID-19 pandemic									
2022‡	Edinburgh	Edinburgh	Edinburgh	Edinburgh	Edinburgh			Edinburgh	Edinburgh	Edinburgh

a. Between 1877 and 1961, races took place in coxed fours

b. Races marked * took place on the Union Canal, Edinburgh

c. Races marked ‡ took place on the River Clyde below the tidal weir

d. Races marked ¤ took place on the River Clyde above the tidal weir

NB. These results are incomplete.

== See also ==
- List of British and Irish varsity matches
- Glasgow University Boat Club
- Edinburgh University Boat Club
- Scottish Rowing
- University rowing in the United Kingdom
