= Simon Cottle (academic) =

English media academic and journalist

Simon Cottle is professor of media and communications at the School of Journalism, Media and Cultural Studies (JOMEC) at Cardiff University. He writes on media, the communication of conflicts, crises and catastrophes, and globalization. He holds honorary professorships at the University of Melbourne and the University of Tasmania.

== Selected publications ==
- TV news, urban conflict, and the inner city. Leicester University Press; Distributed exclusively in the USA and Canada by St. Martin's Press. 1993. ISBN 978-0-7185-1447-1. OCLC 27265365.
- The racist murder of Stephen Lawrence: media performance and public transformation. Praeger. 2004. ISBN 978-0-275-97941-6. OCLC 1169953644.
- Global crisis reporting: journalism in the global age. Open University Press. 2009. ISBN 978-0-335-22139-4. OCLC 610764103.
