= Simon Cottle (rower) =

British rower

- Born: 18 September 1975 (age 50); Chester, England
- Education: Oriel College, Oxford; INSEAD; Columbia Business School
- Occupation: Private equity investor
- Known for: Founding Stanley Capital Partners; Olympic rower

Simon Cottle (born 18 September 1975) is a British private equity investor and former Olympic rower. He represented Great Britain at the 2004 Summer Olympics in rowing.

He became a fund manager at Cognetas, leaving in September 2011. He was a founding partner of Stanley Capital Partners, a private equity firm focused on healthcare, technology, and sustainability, which he subsequently left.

== Rowing career ==
Cottle competed for Great Britain in the men's quadruple sculls at the 2004 Summer Olympics in Athens. He won a bronze medal at the 1999 Commonwealth Rowing Championships, a bronze at the World Student Games and earned two Queen Mother winners medals at the Henley Royal Regatta, including one with Steve Redgrave.
