= Stirling Rowing Club =

Scottish rowing club

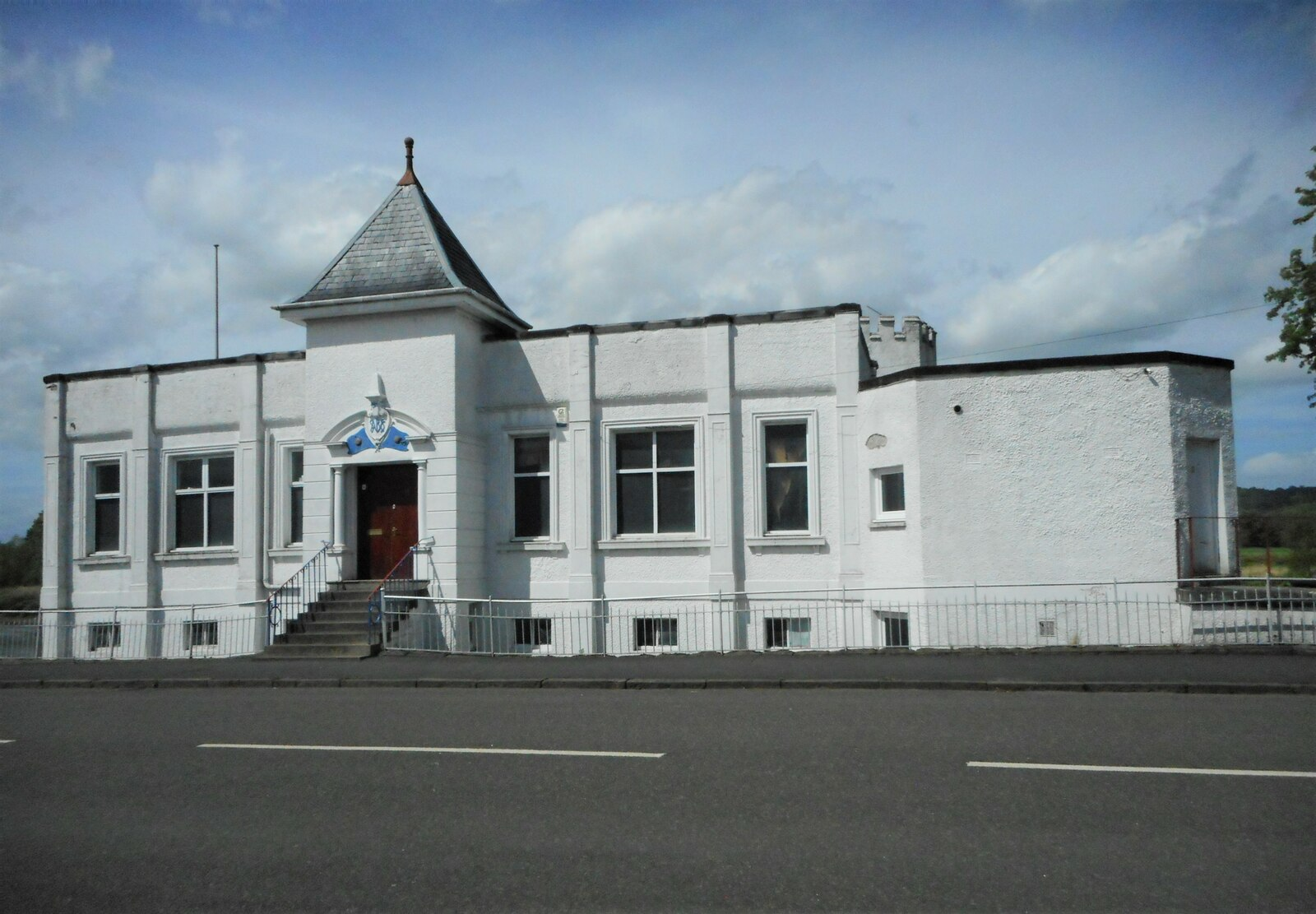

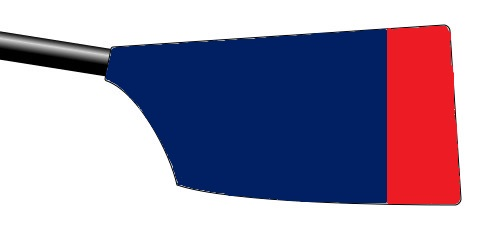
- Location: Dean Crescent / Queenshaugh Drive, Riverside, Stirling, Scotland
- Coordinates: 56.126497°N 3.929259°W
- Founded: 1891
- Affiliations: Scottish Rowing
- Website: www.stirling-rowing.org.uk

Stirling Rowing Club is a rowing club on the River Forth, based at the intersection between Dean Crescent and Queenshaugh Drive, Riverside, Stirling, Scotland. The club is affiliated to Scottish Rowing.

== History ==
The club was founded in 1891, although an earlier Stirling Rowing Club existed from 1853.

The club has produced multiple British champions.

== Honours ==
=== British champions ===
Year	Winning crew/s
1989	Men 8+*
1990	Men J14 1x
1992	Men J16 1x
1997	Men L1x, Men J16 1x
1998	Men U23 1x, Men J18 1x
