= Glasgow University Boat Club =

British rowing club

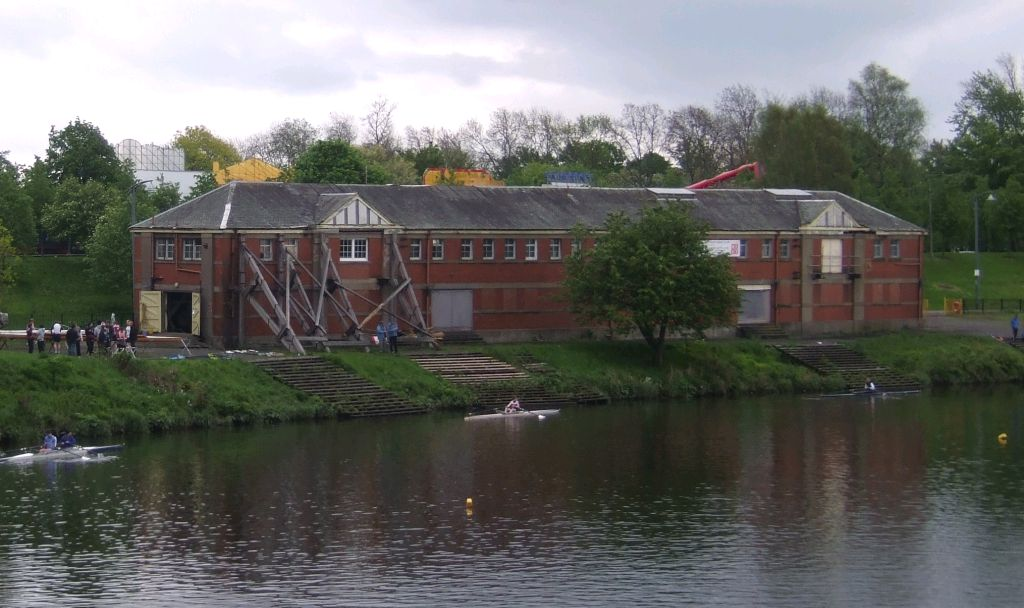

- Location: Glasgow, Scotland
- Coordinates: 55°50′52.5″N 4°14′10.8″W
- Home water: River Clyde
- Founded: 1867
- Former names: Glasgow University Rowing Club
- University: University of Glasgow
- Affiliations: Scottish Rowing
- Website: www.glasgowuniversityrowing.co.uk

Events
- GUBC Western Eights Head, Scottish Boat Race

Glasgow University Boat Club (GUBC) is the rowing club of the University of Glasgow, Scotland. The club is affiliated to Scottish Rowing.

GUBC is one of the most active and successful clubs within the university, producing rowers and crews that have and continue to compete at national and international levels. Club members have frequently been chosen to represent Scotland at both the Home Countries International Regatta and Great Britain at the European Universities Rowing Championships and World Rowing Under-23 Championships.

== History ==
The club was founded as Glasgow University Rowing Club (GURC) in 1867.

The club first competed at Henley Royal Regatta in 1936, sending a four-man crew to compete in the Wyfold cup. In 1960 the crew of a GURC boat rescued a young child who had fallen into the Clyde.

GUBC was an all-male club until 2004, when a historic merger with Glasgow University Ladies Boat Club meant that female students were accepted into the club. Until 2005, the club was the last independently funded sports club at the university, before being joining Glasgow University Sports Association, formerly the GU Athletic Club.

== Training facilities ==
The club trains on the River Clyde at Glasgow Green, boating from the East Boathouse. Built in 1924 the building is home to the club's boats and member's private singles. Rowers have access to 6km of non-tidal water between the weir at Glasgow Green and Belvidere Straight adjacent to Cuningar Woodland Park. The club also has its own land training space equipped with rowing ergometer and free weights. This is shared with a few other sports clubs within the University of Glasgow but the club also has access to the university's main gym facilities in the Stevenson Building.

== Scottish Boat Race ==
Glasgow University Boat Club competes against Edinburgh University Boat Club in the Scottish Boat Race, an annual boat race featuring competing eights on the River Clyde. It is the second oldest University Boat Race in the United Kingdom after the Oxford and Cambridge Boat Race and the third oldest in the world. In 2013 the course for the Scottish Boat Race was changed from above the weir at Glasgow Green to below the weir with the finish in line with the Tall Ship at the Riverside Museum.

Currently Glasgow hold neither trophy, however the Glasgow men's first VIII had won the trophy thirteen times consecutively from 2000 to 2012.

== Honours ==
=== British champions ===
Year	Winning crew/s
1993	Men U23 1x
2005	Open Ltw2x, Women Ltw2-
2006	Open 2x, Open Ltw2x, Open U23 L2x, Women Ltw2-

== See also ==
- University rowing (UK)
- Scottish Rowing
