= Aberdeen Boat Club =

Scottish rowing club

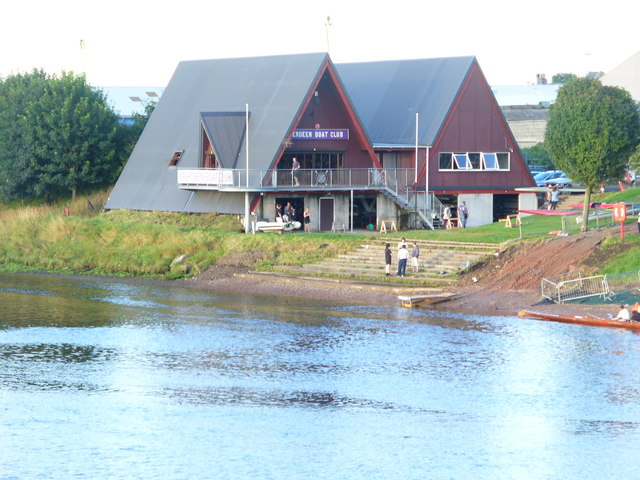

- Location: 29 S Esplanade W, Aberdeen, Scotland
- Coordinates: 57.1374°N 2.0932°W
- Home water: Tidal, embanked, River Dee, Aberdeenshire
- Founded: 1865
- Affiliations: Scottish Rowing
- Website: www.abc-dee.co.uk

Aberdeen Boat Club is a rowing club on the River Dee, based at 29 S Esplanade W, Aberdeen, Scotland. The club is affiliated with Scottish Rowing.

== History ==
The club was founded in 1865 when four boats were purchased. Several boathouses have existed throughout the club's history, the first was at the Ferryhill Burn Nr Bank Street. In 1876 a second boathouse was built in Polmuir and this was later followed a £60 purchase of the university boathouse in 1924. The boathouse was sold back to the university in 1953 when the club experienced a difficult period. A new boathouse was constructed in 1982 which gained an extension in 1994 with two additional boat bays.

The club won the prestigious Wyfold Challenge Cup at the Henley Regatta in 2002 and has produced several national champions.

== Sharing with other clubs ==
The club shares its boats and landing stage with Aberdeen Schools Rowing Association, whose dedicated boats have prefix ASR.

It also has sharing arrangements with Aberdeen University Boat Club and one school has its own boats, as its full fleet in large part, forming Albyn School Boat Club.

== Honours ==
=== Henley Royal Regatta ===
Year	Winning crew
2002	Wyfold Challenge Cup

=== British champions ===
Year	Winning crew/s
2006	Women 2-
2010	Women L2- (composite crew)
2011	Women L2-

=== Head of the River Race ===
Year	Winning crew
2026	Small Club Pennant
