= University of Strathclyde Sports Union =

University sports venue in Glasgow, Scotland

The University of Strathclyde Sports Union is an organisation coordinating sports for students at the University of Strathclyde. As such it is made up of many other smaller sports clubs, each participating in a particular sport. Its main centre of activity is the University of Strathclyde Centre for Sports and Recreation located on the John Anderson Campus of the University.

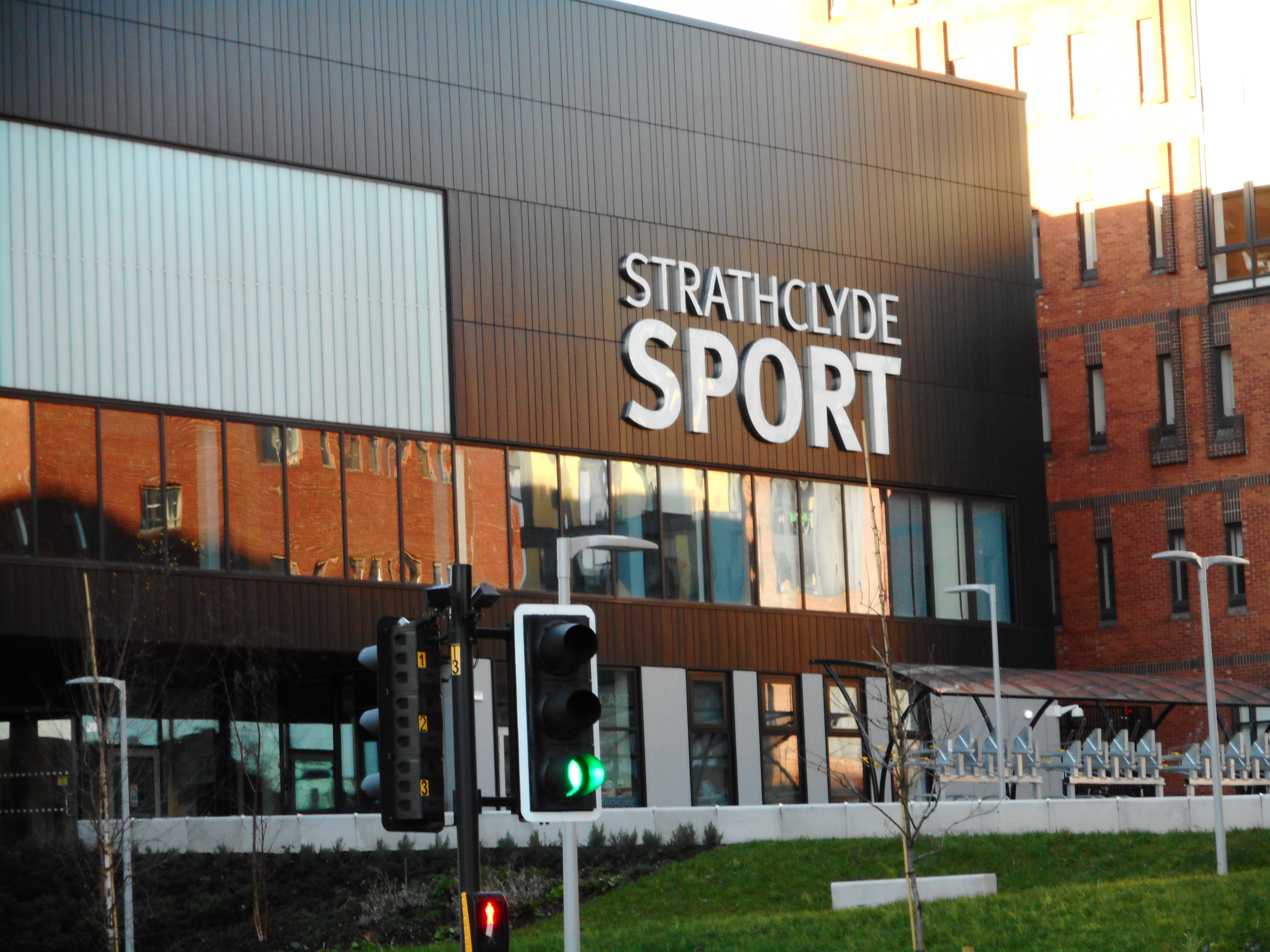

== History ==
Established in 1921 as the "Royal Technical College Athletic Club", the club experienced many name changes and organisational alterations over the years until it finally became an official part of the Students Union in 1989 after merging with the University of Strathclyde Students' Association. Both Unions have separate facilities and identities still, however they are managed under the one Union.

== Operations ==
=== Staff ===
Decisions that are relevant to the Sports Union are made democratically, with every registered member of the Sports Union having a vote on issues that are discussed. Each year students elect a Sports President to serve a paid, one-year term, with the assistance of the Sports Executive, which consists of 12 Student volunteers who are elected to a range of positions within the Union. These staff members operate from offices within both the Centre for sports and Recreation and from within the Students Union.

The Students Union building where some of the offices are located.

The Union maintains close ties and works alongside other clubs and associations within the University, such as the Centre for Sport and Recreation where they are based, and also with external, official organisations such as British Universities and Colleges Sport (BUCS).

The Union maintains two full-time members of staff that assist in the every day running of events - The Sports Administrator, who is responsible for arranging transport, assisting members with questions and much more, who works alongside the Sports Development Co-ordinator, who helps with coaching, safety aspects within the Union and maintaining links with national governing sport bodies.

=== Work Outside the University ===
The University Sports Union also carries out work with Associations that are not run by the University in order to improve the local area. For example, The Union partnered with basketball Scotland in October 2011 to hold a tournament encouraging local school Children to take up basketball, thereby increasing their fitness and interest in sport.

Strathclyde Sports Union is also partnered with Scottish Student Sport(SSS) in an attempt to promote competitive sport to Scotland's Young people, while a partnership with BUCS aims to further increase participation in a wide range of sports already under undertaken at the University.

The Union also partakes in the Annual Freshers Intervarsity Sports Day in which First Year student teams from Strathclyde, Glasgow and Glasgow Caledonian Universities can partake in order to socialise with other new students and also gain an idea of the sports on offer.

On Friday 9 March 2012 the University Sports Union hosted the Second LEAD 2014 Conference in partnership with the Youth Sport Trust, Glasgow 2014 and Sportscotland with approximately 140 local school children attending the event. The workforce will be a group of student volunteers from a variety of clubs.

=== Facilities ===
While the union does not own any facilities itself, the University of Strathclyde makes a number of facilities available for the use of its members. These include:

- A Large multi-purpose activities room that is used by a variety of clubs for training sessions.
- A conditioning suite featuring 58 various Cardiovascular Machines, as well as a range of weights and other fitness items. This suite also provides access to lockers, and provides an induction for those members who are new to the facility.
- A gym in the Royal College which is best suited for small size fitness classes, table tennis, martial arts, fencing and personal fitness training.
- A sports hall that has the capacity for 17 different sports courts, and is also equipped for two indoor cricket nets, with provision for a practice golf net and also trampolining.
- 6 squash Courts
- A swimming Pool In the Royal College Building
- A dedicated Weights room

=== Membership ===
In order to join the Sports Union, individuals have to purchase a one-year membership card. This costs either £30 for current students of the University of Strathclyde, or £44 for Strathclyde graduates and members of staff. However, some clubs also charge fees for membership to the club, which may be one-off or per lesson.

Students can sign up for the Sports Union or its clubs at any time throughout the year. However, the membership lasts from the start of the academic year to the end of the school year, not for one year from the purchase. However, both the USSA and the sports union hold a 'Fresher's Fair' at the start of the academic year to encourage students to sign up.

== Clubs and Associations ==
At Strathclyde there are 48 different Clubs and associations that students can join during their studies.

Aikido	Archery	Athletics	Badminton
Basketball (M&W)	Boxing	Canoe	Cheerleading	Cricket
Cross Country	Curling	Cycling/ Mountain Biking	Dance	Equestrian	Fencing
Flag American	Football	Football (M&W)	Gaelic Football	Golf (M&W)	Handball	Hockey (M&W)
Judo (M&W)	Karate	Kendo	Korfball	Lacrosse	Mixed Martial Arts
Mountaineering	Muay Thai Kickboxing	Netball	Orienteering	Pool & Snooker
Rowing	Rugby (M&W)	Sailing	Shinty	Shooting
Skydiving	Snowsports	Squash	Sub Aqua
Surfing	Swimming	Table Tennis	Tennis
Trampoline	Ultimate Frisbee	Volleyball	Wakeboarding

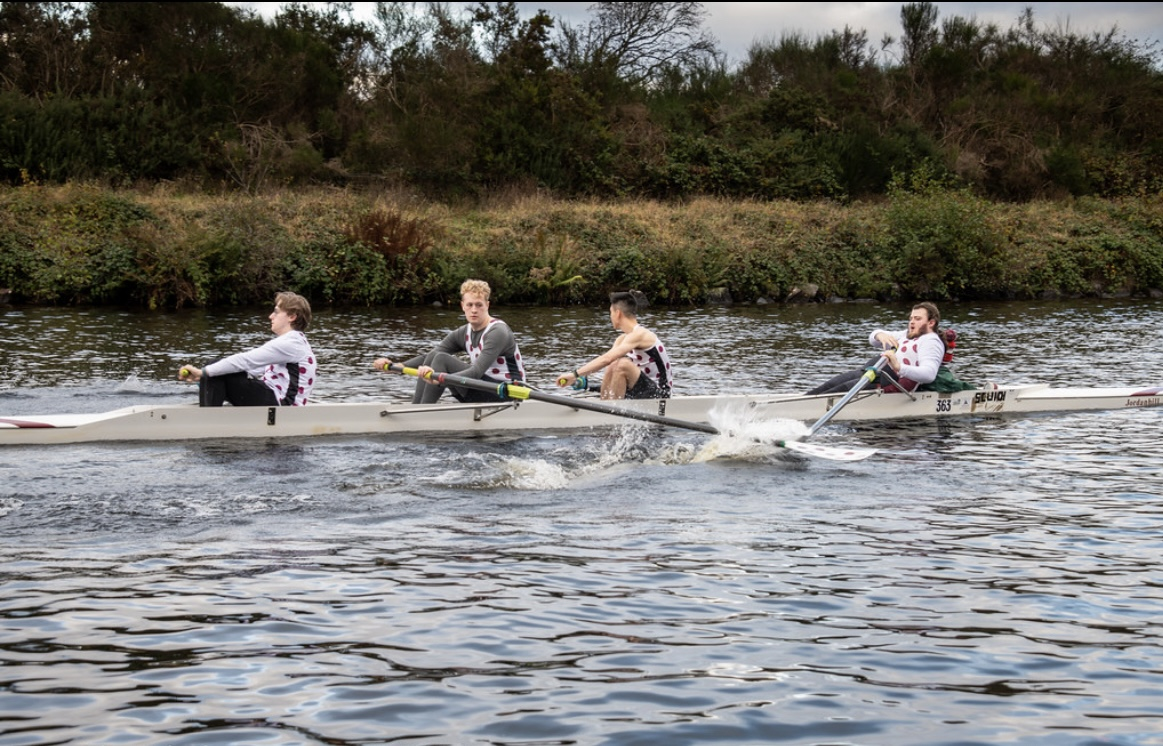
Top Strathclyde Uni Rowing crew at inverness

- In football, there is also a club for graduates, Cambria AFC, who play at the University's facilities in Millerston and compete in the same league (the Caledonian AFL) as the Strathclyde students' team.

== Awards and bursaries ==
=== Union awards ===
The Union has a set of annual awards designed for those club members who, in the eyes of their club committees, deserve recognition for achievements they have made. These Include:

- BLUES
- HALF BLUES
- COLOURS
- The Duncan Matheson Trophy
- The Graduates Trophy
- Sportsman of the Year
- Sportswoman of the Year
- The Bursars Trophy
- David Tedford Trophy
- Honorary Life Member of the Sports Union
- Honorary Life Member of Section

The Union Itself has also received the "Healthy Body, Healthy Mind" Bronze award from the National Union of Students and the Scottish Universities Sport in recognition of their work in boosting mental health through sport. They are one of only Two university sports unions in Scotland to achieve this award.

Strathclyde Sports Union's individual Clubs also receive awards for their work and for their participation in competitions.

=== Bursaries ===
The University of Strathclyde work along with Glasgow City Council to offer Sports Bursaries to both sports men and women whom wish it is to further their sporting careers while also continuing their academic studies at the university.

After achieving or demonstrating the required standard, applicants will then be considered for the programme. If accepted, the programme offers students a comprehensive support package in order to facilitate both training, competing in events and studying in equal balance, while also providing access to sporting facilities at all Universities in Glasgow.

The university also runs a successful Golf Scholarship programme in association with the R&A.

== Notable alumni ==
Robbie Renwick: In the 2010 Delhi Commonwealth Games, Robbie Renwick won the first gold medal of the games for Scotland in the 200m freestyle swimming before going on to win a silver medal the next day in the final 200m of the 4x200m freestyle relay. This added to his previous Commonwealth success after he won a silver medal in the 4x200m freestyle relay team. In 2008 he took part in his first Olympic games, earning 8th in the 200m freestyle and 6th in the 4x200m freestyle relay event. He is also due to take part in the London 2012 Olympic Games in the 4x100m freestyle event. Robbie also currently holds the Scottish record for the Long Course 100m freestyle with a time of 49.53s.
