= Edinburgh University Boat Club =

British rowing club

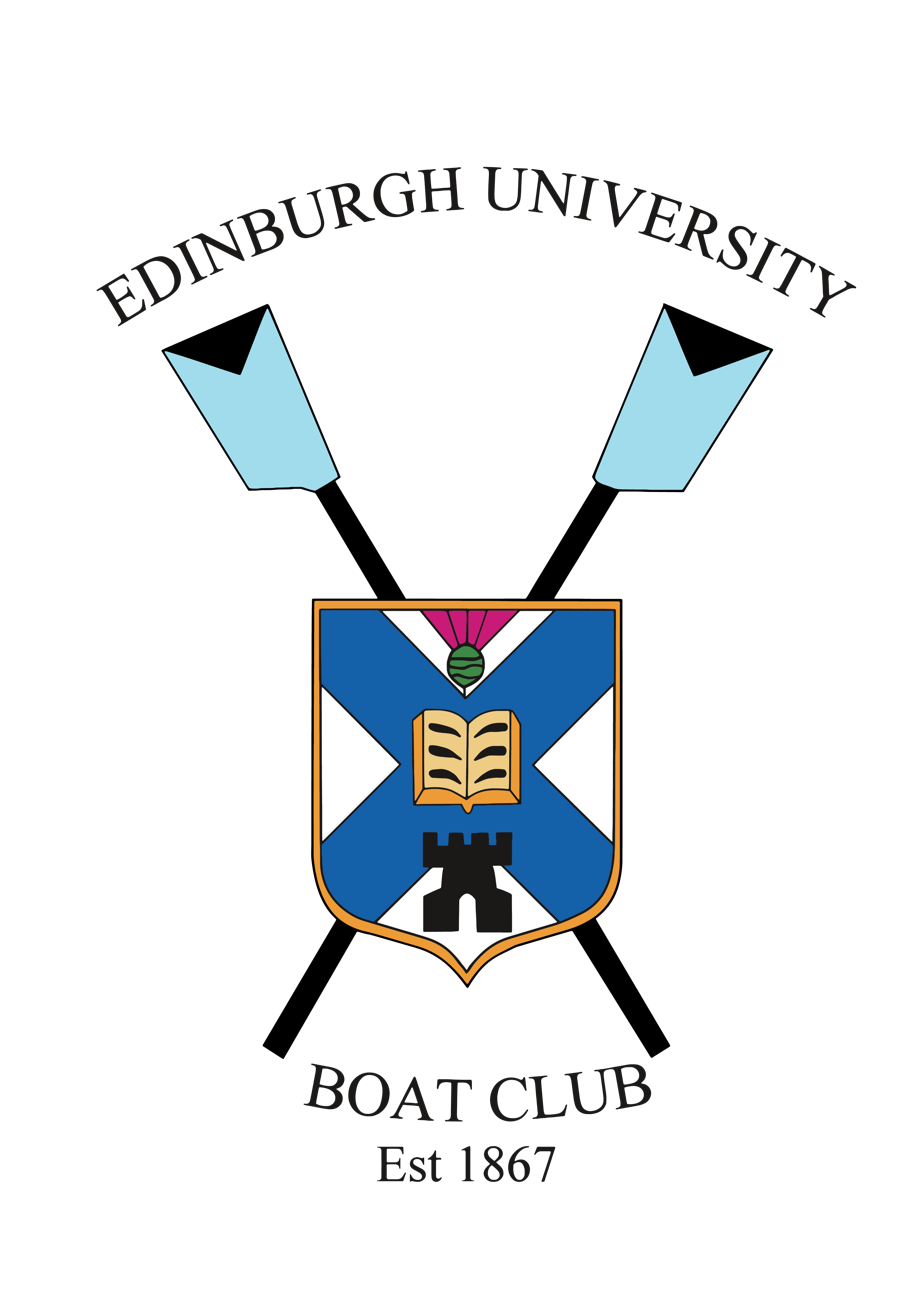

- Location: Edinburgh, Scotland
- Home water: Union Canal and Strathclyde Park
- Founded: 1867
- Key people: Colin Williamson (Coach)|John Higson (Coach)|Michael Hughes (Coach)}}
- Membership: ~200
- University: University of Edinburgh
- Affiliations: Scottish Rowing
- Website: edinburghrowing.co.uk

Events
- Scottish Boat Race

Edinburgh University Boat Club (EUBC) is one of the oldest sports clubs of the University of Edinburgh, in the city of Edinburgh, Scotland.

Originally started in 1867 it has been going continuously ever since. The annual Edinburgh/Glasgow Boat Race first took place in 1877, ten years after the boat club started. As one of the largest rowing clubs in Scotland, it has over a hundred active members, with many crews competing at all levels. The club celebrated its 150th anniversary in 2017. The club is affiliated to Scottish Rowing.

In May 2022, EUBC won the Victor Ludorum at the BUCS Regatta.

== Facilities and training ==
The senior fleet is racked at Strathclyde Park, Scotland's purpose built regatta lake, where most water training takes place. Novice crews also row on the Union Canal in Edinburgh, which enables them to train on the water during the week.

Land training takes place in the Pleasance Centre for Sport and Exercise, which has weights rooms and a fleet of ergs in the purpose-built Katherine Grainger rowing gym.

== Honours ==
=== National champions ===
Year	Winning crew/s
1991	Women 4+
1994	Women 2-
1997	Women 2-
2006	Open U23 2x
2018	Victor Ludorum, Open 2x, Women 2x

Key- 2, 4, 8 (crew size), x (sculls), - (coxless), + (coxed)

=== Henley Royal Regatta ===
Year	Races won
2016	Prince Albert Challenge Cup
2019	Prince of Wales Challenge Cup

== Notable members ==
- Maddie Arlett, GB lightweight sculler
- Leslie Balfour-Melville, all-round
- Dot Blackie, Olympic rower
- Lucy Glover, Olympic rower
- Katherine Grainger, Olympic gold medalist
- Alistair Potts, 2000 World champion and Boat Race winner
- Polly Swann, Olympic silver medalist, World champion

== See also ==
- University of Edinburgh
- Edinburgh University Sports Union
- University rowing (UK)
