= List of rowing clubs =

== Country ==
=== Australia ===
Blade	Club	Description
	Drummoyne Rowing Club	Yellow blade
	Glebe Rowing Club	Red blade
	Mosman Rowing Club	Red with a white stripe
	North Shore Rowing Club	Dark blue, white stripe
	Sydney Rowing Club	Eton blue blade

=== Belgium ===
Blade	Club	Description
	KRSG, Ghent	Light blue - white - light blue

=== Croatia ===
Blade	Club	Description
	Rowing Club Dupin (Tisno)	Blue and Gold
	Arupinum Rowing Club	Blue and White
	Istria Rowing Club	Blue and White
	Medulin Rowing Club	Blue and Gold
	RC Glagoljas	Light yellow

=== England ===
Blade	Club	Description
	Abingdon Rowing Club	Dark green with yellow triangle
	AB Severn Rowing Club	Black with white circle
	Agecroft Rowing Club	White and dark blue split by a red horizontal stripe
	Auriol Kensington Rowing Club	Green and lilac with an oblique divide
	Avon County Rowing Club	Black with broad amber tips
	Barn Elms Rowing Club	White with green triangle
	Barnes Bridge Ladies Rowing Club	Mid-blue with white tips
	Bedford Rowing Club	Maroon with two white & blue stripes around one maroon
	Berwick Amateur Rowing Club	Royal blue with double white chevrons
	Bewdley Rowing Club	Blue with yellow stripe
	Bewl Bridge Rowing Club	Dark green and white quarters
	Birmingham Rowing Club	White with blue triangle tip
	Bournemouth Rowing Club	White with black and red stripe
	Bradford Amateur Rowing Club	Dark blue with three white parallelograms
	Bristol Ariel Rowing Club	White & Oxford Blue Berkeley cross)
	Broxbourne Rowing Club	White with light and dark blue diagonal
	Burton Leander Rowing Club	White with thin black & thick red triangle
	Burway Rowing Club	Dark blue with a gold stripe (narrow, diagonally)
	Cambois Rowing Club	Dark green (per BR handbook: green) with white-triangle tips
	Cambridge '99 Rowing Club	Light blue with thin green stripe & yellow tip
	Cantabrigian Rowing Club	Dark blue with silver stripe
	Chester-le-Street Amateur Rowing Club	Royal blue with oblique white stripe and red tips
	Christchurch Rowing Club	Green, yellow & blue horizontal thirds
	City of Bristol Rowing Club	Green with white diagonal divide
	City of Cambridge Rowing Club	Navy blue with two gold & claret stripes
	City of Oxford Rowing Club	Oxford blue with diagonal white stripe and a red tip
	City of Sheffield Rowing Club	White & grey quarters
	Dart Totnes Amateur Rowing Club	Black
	Derby Rowing Club	White with navy, light blue and red stripe
	Durham Amateur Rowing Club	Dark blue with gold stripe
	Eton Excelsior Rowing Club	Dark blue, thin amber stripe
	Evesham Rowing Club	Dark blue with white tip (thin)
	Exeter Rowing Club	Green with white tip
	Westminster School Boat Club	Pink (sometimes blue triangle tips)
	Furnivall Sculling Club	White with 2 green & 1 gold stripe
	Globe Rowing Club	Dark blue & broad white diagonal stripe to upper tip
	Gloucester Rowing Club	Black with red and white stripe
	Grosvenor Rowing Club	Dark blue with orange stripes (two, thin)
	Guildford Rowing Club	Green, two gold bars
	Henley Rowing Club	Dark blue with white collar
	Hereford Rowing Club	Blue with red and white stripe
	Hexham Rowing Club	Old gold, royal blue saltaire and red tip
	Hinksey Sculling School	Light blue and white half diagonal
	Hollingworth Lake Rowing Club	White & blue half diagonal
	HSBC Rowing Club	Mid-blue base, small red and white stripes above
	Isle of Ely Rowing Club	White with large light blue & dark blue stripe
	Kingston Grammar School; Veterans Boat Club (alumni)	Royal red with a thick white stripe incorporating a thin red 'v'
	Kingston Rowing Club	Carmine red. Per BR handbook: scarlet.
	Lancaster John O' Gaunt	Dark blue with gold stripe
	Lea Rowing Club	Orange
	Leander Club	Cerise
	Leeds Rowing Club	Navy blue with light blue tip
	Leicester Rowing Club	White, black and white
	Lincoln Rowing Center	White with two red stripes (thin)
	London Otters Rowing Club	Navy blue, bronze chevron and white tips
	London Rowing Club	White & two navy blue bars: twice-interrupted (white)
	Maidenhead Rowing Club	Dark (Brunswick) green with same star ('five rays') in white circle
	Maidstone Invicta Rowing Club	Lilac & very dark blue stripe (from mid-upper to base of tip)
	Marlow Rowing Club	Maroon & white-edged base and tips
	Medway Towns Rowing Club	White; or red with amber stripe & white motif
	Minerva Bath Rowing Club	Yellow
	Molesey Boat Club	Black
	Mortlake Anglian & Alpha	Black, white & red (three bands)
	Newark Rowing Club	Red with blue tip
	Northwich Rowing Club	Yellow & green horizontal halves
	Norwich Rowing Club	Yellow
	Nottingham & Union Rowing Club	Half black with half red triangle
	Nottingham Rowing Club	Navy and light blue with a yellow stripe
	Nottinghamshire County Rowing Association	White
	Navy Rowing Club	Navy
	Paignton Amateur Rowing Club	Gold with blue 'dips' (small triangle at base of tips)
	Peterborough City Rowing Club	Blue with yellow triangle
	Putney Town Rowing Club	Dark blue with a white bar
	Reading Rowing Club	White with three mid-shade
	Rob Roy Boat Club	Red & white diagonal halves
	Ross Rowing Club	Red, white & blue diagonals
	Royal Chester Rowing Club	Blue
	Runcorn Rowing Club	Royal blue with two white bars
	St Ives Rowing Club	Red
	St Neots Rowing Club	Light blue with thick, dark blue bar (per Handbook: just bar)
	Shanklin Sandown Rowing Club	Light blue
	Shiplake Vikings Rowing Club	Black, red split by yellow diagonal
	Sons of the Thames	White with two mid-blue bars that cross-over (chain style) ("crossbars")
	Staines Boat Club	Dark green
	Star Club & Bedford Star	White with red star
	Stratford-upon-Avon Boat Club	White with tip halved in red & black
	Sudbury Rowing Club	Blue with white triangle
	Talkin Tarn Amateur Rowing Club	Maroon uppers, gold bases
	Tees Rowing Club	Sky blue with an oblique split for a maroon tip
	Thames Rowing Club	Black and 2 offset, repeating bursts of red, white and black as bars: white
	Thames Tradesmen's Rowing Club	Claret uppers, white middles, (dark) green bases
	Tideway Scullers School	Centre-split obliquely: red with true yellow tips
	Trent Rowing Club	Light blue with a white triangle
	Twickenham Rowing Club	Magenta amid (quite dark) blue
	Two Lions Boat Club; Birmingham University alumni	Black with gold two-headed upright lion
	Tyne Rowing Club	Black with two thin white stripes
	Vesta Rowing Club	Crimson, black stripe
	Walbrook Rowing Club	Black, yellow and mid-green (diagonally split in 3 bands)
	Wallingford Rowing Club	Maroon and cyan (diagonally split, maroon to tip and top)
	Walton Rowing Club	Dark blue, light blue and maroon (3 bands)
	Warrington Rowing Club	White, primrose yellow and royal blue (3 bands)
	Weybridge Rowing Club	Light blue, two dark blue chevrons (outward-pointing)
	Weybridge Ladies Amateur Rowing Club	Dark blue, light blue and scarlet (three bands)
	Worcester Rowing Club	White, one vermillion and two black bars
	York City Rowing Club	White, three thin stripes of purple, black and bright gold

=== Hungary ===
Blade	Club	Description
	Tisza Rowing Club (Szolnok)	White with blue triangle
	Arrabona Rowing Club (Győr)	White with green and red stripes
	Budapest Rowing Club	Red blade
	Csepel Evezős Klub	Blue blade with red chevron
	Csongrádi Vízügyi Sportegyesület Rowing Club	Orange blade
	Danubius National Boat Club	White with two black stripes
	Esztergom Rowing Club	Blue with red with hungarian flag at the end
	Ferencvárosi Rowing Club	Green
	Győr Athletic Club – Rowing Section	White with blue and maroon stripe
	Kalocsa Rowing and Water Sports Club	Maroon with white triangle
	Külker Rowing Club	White with blues stripe and logo
	MTK Budapest - Rowing Section	White
	MEC Rowing	White with pink and black stripes
	Mohács Sport Club	White
	Mosonmagyaróvár Rowing Club	Yellow
	Szeged Rowing Club	White with red chevron and blue tips
	Szolnok Sportcentrum	Blue with yellow horizontal stripe
	Tata Water Sport Club	White
	Vác Rowing Club	White

=== Netherlands ===
Blade	Club	Description
	Æengwirden rowing club	White with blue band and seeblatt
	Amstel rowing club	Navy blue with white diagonal stripe
	RV Breda rowing club	Red with white cross
	De Drietand rowing club	White with blue scissored tip
	RZV Gouda rowing club	White with two red stripes
	Rowing club Leerdam	Divided blade with top blue and bottom white
	Die Leythe	Alternative black and orange vertical bands
	K.A.R.Z.V. De Hoop	White with 2 black and red bands
	RV Naarden	White with yellow and blue bands
	AWV Ondine	Grey with red stripe and white tip
	RZV Poseidon	Red with white stripe
	RIC (rowing club)	Orange with white stripe and black tip
	K.R.Z.V. Het Spaarne	White with 2 red bands
	Willem III Rowing Club	Blue with white diamond

=== Northern Ireland ===
Blade	Club	Description
	Bann Rowing Club	red with single white stripe

=== Poland ===
Blade	Club	Description
	AZS-AWFiS Gdansk	White with navy horizontal stripe
	AZS-AWF Krakow	White
	AZS-AWF Poznan	White with light blue horizontal stripe
	AZS-AWF Warszawa	White
	AZS Szczecin	Red with white horizontal stripe
	AZS UMK Torun	White and green half diagonals
	AZS Uniwersytet Warszawski	Dark blue with crest
	AZS Wratislavia Wroclaw	White with red horizontal partition
	KST Budowlani Torun	Red with two white stripes
	Bydgoski Klub Wioslarek	White and blue chessboard form
	Bydgoskie Towarzystwo Wioslarskie	Blue with white and red chevron
	Bydgostia Bydgoszcz	White with 2 red stripes and blue diagonal
	Chelmzynskie Towarzystwo Wioslarskie	white and light blue halves with dark blue partition
	DRAKKAR Gdańsk	White with red and blue diagonal stripe
	KW-04 w Poznaniu	White with 3 red stars
	KW Goplo Kruszwica	White and blue
	GTW Gedania Gdansk	Red with white and blue striped tip
	KW Wisla Grudziadz	red, white and blue horizontal
	MKS Brdow	White with 2 blue diagonal stripes
	MOS Elk	Horizontally: white-dark blue-red
	MOS nr 2 Warszawa	Yellow
	Pegaz Wroclaw	Blue
	Plockie Towarzystwo Wioslarskie	White/red with a dark blue triangle on the edge
	Posnania Poznan	Golden with 3 vertical stripes: white-red-white
	PTW Tryton Poznan	Dark blue with vertical white stripe
	Sokół Ostróda	White with blue and red stripe
	Towarzystwo Wisla dla Wioslarzy	Orange with a white chevron and blue triangle
	TW Polonia Poznan	White with two red chevrons
	UKS '93' Krakow	Blue with two white vertical stripes
	UKS Ateny Walcz	White with yellow and blue stripe
	UKS Milenium Wroclaw	Blue with red horizontal stripe
	UKS Remo Niechcice	Green with white and red strip
	Unia Tczew	Blue with red tip
	Wir Ilawa	White with green and red stripe
	Warszawskie Towarzystwo Wioslarskie	White with 2 blue stripes
	Warsaw Rowing Club	Full black
	WTW Włoclawek	Blue with two red diagonal stripes
	Zawisza Bydgoszcz	Red with white star

=== Portugal ===
Blade	Club	Description
	Associação Naval de Lisboa	Dark blue - White - Dark blue
	Clube Naval Infante D. Henrique	Dark blue - White - Dark red
	Sport Club do Porto	Dark blue with a white star.

=== Scotland ===
Blade	Club	Description
	Aberdeen Boat Club	Blue with white triangle
	Castle Semple Rowing Club	Red with small crest
	Clyde Amateur Rowing Club	White with blue star
	Clydesdale Amateur Rowing Club	Dark blue with long white cross
	Glasgow Rowing Club	Red uppers, yellow bases and black triangular tips
	Inverness Rowing Club	Four green and red triangles
	Loch Lomond Rowing Club	White with thick red stripe
	Nithsdale Amateur Rowing Club	
	St Andrew Boat Club	White with a blue Saltire cross
	Stirling Rowing Club	
	Strathclyde Park Rowing Club	Blue with light blue diagonal

=== Spain ===
Blade	Club	Description
	Club Nàutic Tortosa	Red uppers and triangular tips and white bases
	Club de Remo Guadalquivir 86	Red with diagonal white strip
	Club de Remo Hondarribia	Solid light green
	Club de Remo Itsasoko Ama	Violet with white outer edge
	Club de Remo Tui	Solid blue
	Club Natació Banyoles	White with two thin stripes, one blue and one red
	Club Nàutic Amposta	Diagonal white stripe on a black background
	Club Nàutic de Tarragona	Dark red with long blue cross
	Club Náutico Sevilla	White with a wide diagonal green stripe
	Club de Remo do Miño, Tui	White with a wide vertical light blue stripe
	Club de Remo Olímpico Orio	Solid yellow
	Club Tiempo Libre El Ejido	Solid sky blue with "El Ejido" official mark
	Real Círculo de Labradores de Sevilla	Red and blue with a white cross
	Reial Club de Regatas de Alicante	White with dark blue cross
	Reial Club Maritim de Barcelona	Dark blue with long white cross

=== United States ===
Blade	Club	Description
	Detroit Boat Club	Henley blue bottom with red stripe and white on top
	Fairmount Rowing Association	Diagonal split blue and white
	Los Gatos Rowing Club	Divided blade with top white and bottom blue
	New Haven Rowing Club	White back with blue and green stripe
	Space Coast Crew	Light Blue
	University Barge Club, Schuylkill Navy	Blue and White
	Willamette Rowing Club	Cherry Red blade with White tip

=== Wales ===
Blade	Club	Description
	Llandaff Rowing Club	White with black tip
	Monmouth Rowing Club	Deep purple with 2 white chevrons
