= 2025 British Rowing Club Championships =

British rowing event

- Venue: National Water Sports Centre
- Location: Holme Pierrepont (Nottingham)
- Dates: 18–21 July 2025

The 2025 British Rowing Championships were the 2025 edition of the National Senior and Junior Championships, held from 18 to 21 July 2025 at the National Water Sports Centre in Holme Pierrepont, Nottingham.

They were organised and sanctioned by British Rowing, and were open to British rowers. The championships were now called the British Rowing Club Championships.

== Senior ==
=== Medal summary ===
Event	Gold	Silver	Bronze
Open club 1x	Leicester	Hereford	Lea
Open Lwt 1x	Clydesdale	Kingston	Univ of Bath
Open club 2-	Nottingham	Dart Totnes	Wallingford
Open club 2x	Univ of Birmingham	Nottingham (A)	Nottingham (C)
Open 2x	Hinksey	Clydesdale / Edinburgh Univ	Univ of Bath
Open club 4+	Kingston	Dart Totnes	Claires Court Sch
Open club 4x-	Nottingham	Univ of Bath	Newark
Open 4-	Hereford	Derby	Agecroft
Open club 4-	Globe	Tideway Scullers	Nottingham
Open club 8+	Hereford	City of Cambridge	Derby
Women club 1x	Leicester	Newark	Warrington
Women Lwt 1x	City of Oxford	Worcester	Hollingworth Lake
Women club 2-	Sir W Perkins's Sch	Nottingham	Wallingford
Women 2x	Univ of Bath	Cambridge Univ / Oxford Univ	Univ of Leeds / Leeds
Women club 2x	Leicester	Nottingham	Warrington
Women club 4+	Agecroft	Millfield Sch	Cambridge Univ
Women club 4x-	Warrington	Nottingham	Notts CRA
Women club 4-	Wallingford	Notts CRA	Nottingham
Women club 8+	Auriol Kensington	Sudbury	Cambridge Univ

== Junior ==
=== Medal summary ===
Event	Gold	Silver	Bronze
Open J18 1x	Durham	Hartpury Univ & Coll	Northampton
Open J18 2-	Walton	St George's Coll B	St George's Coll A
Open J18 2x	Windsor Boys' Sch	Hartpury Univ & Coll	Northampton
Open J18 4-	St George's Coll	Wallingford	Nottm & Union
Open J18 4x-	Windsor Boys' Sch	Sir W Borlase's GS	Tideway Scullers
Open J18 8+	Claires Court Sch	Reading Blue Coat Sch	Leeds
Open J16 1x	Durham	Lambton	Trentham
Open J16 2-	Wallingford	Windsor Boys' Sch	Kingston GS
Open J16 2x	Sir W Borlase's GS	Windsor Boys' Sch	Wallingford
Open J16 4+	Wallingford	Windsor Boys' Sch	Claires Court Sch
Open J16 4x-	George Watsons Coll	Windsor Boys' Sch	Henley
Open J15 1x	Tideway Scullers	Windsor Boys' Sch	Bedford
Open J15 2x	Aberdeen Schs	Cambois	Brentford
Open J15 4x+	Henley	Windsor Boys' Sch	Cambois / Chester le Street
Open J14 1x	Exeter	Globe	City of Oxford
Open J14 2x	A B Severn	Burton Leander	Chester le Street
Open J14 4x+	Hereford	Leeds	Walbrook
Women J18 1x	Barn Elms	Rob Roy B	Rob Roy A
Women J18 2-	Sir W Perkin's Sch	Nottingham / Nottm & Union	Clydesdale / Univ of Glasgow
Women J18 2x	Rob Roy	Barn Elms	Claires Court Sch
Women J18 4-	Sir W Perkins's Sch	Calpe	Glasgow Academy
Women J18 4x-	Sir W Perkins's Sch / Wallingford	Hartpury Univ & Coll	Agecroft / Chester le Street / Leeds / Strathclyde Park
Women J18 8+	Marlow	Aberdeen Schs	Wallingford
Women J16 1x	Hartpury Univ & Coll	Glasgow	Strathclyde Park
Women J16 2x	Marlow	Hartpury Univ & Coll	Barn Elms
Women J16 2-	Aberdeen Schs	Sir W Perkins's Sch	Wallingford
Women J16 4+	Wallingford	Trent	Lambton / Tyne United
Women J16 4x-	George Heriots Sch	Leeds	Wallingford
Women J15 1x	City of Bristol	Chester le Street	Cambois
Women J15 2x	Trent	Trafford	Aberdeen Schs
Women J15 4x+	Clydesdale / Strathclyde Park	Trent	Maidenhead
Women J14 1x	Chester le Street	Peterborough City	Nott'm & Union
Women J14 2x	Exeter	Durham / Lambton	Berwick / Lambton
Women J14 4x+	Walbrook	Queen Elizabeth HS	George Watsons Coll

=== Key ===
Symbol	meaning
1, 2, 4, 8	crew size
+	coxed
-	coxless
x	sculls
14	Under-14
15	Under-15
16	Under-16
J	Junior
Lwt	Lightweight
