= 2022 British Rowing Junior Championships =

Rowing competition

- Venue: National Water Sports Centre
- Location: Holme Pierrepont (Nottingham)
- Dates: 15–17 July 2022

The 2022 British Rowing Junior Championships were the 50th edition of the National Junior Championships, held from 17 to 19 July 2022 at the National Water Sports Centre in Holme Pierrepont, Nottingham

They are organised and sanctioned by British Rowing, and are open to British junior rowers.

== Winners ==
Event	Gold	Silver	Bronze
Open J18 1x	NCRA	Wycliffe	Trentham
Open J18 2-	Great Marlow	Pangbourne	Llandaff
Open J18 2x	Windsor Boys'	Nottingham & Union	Weybridge
Open J18 4-	Hereford	Hampton; Molesey	Aberdeen Schools
Open J18 4x	Windsor Boys'	Marlow	George Watson's
Open J18 8+	Hampton	Llandaff	Claires Court
Open J16 1x	Chester-le-Street	Rob Roy	Calpe
Open J16 2-	Hinksey	Tideway Scullers School	NCRA
Open J16 2x	Newark	City of Bristol	Windsor Boys'
Open J16 4+	Aberdeen Schools	Claires Court	Great Marlow
Open J16 4x	Windsor Boys'	Tideway Scullers School	Lea
Open J15 1x	Windsor Boys'	Newark	Bewl Bridge
Open J15 2x	Lea	Tideway Scullers School	Maidenhead
Open J15 4x+	Windsor Boys'	Hereford	Sir William Borlase
Open J14 1x	Chester-le-Street	Wycliffe	Glasgow Academy
Open J14 2x	Shanklin Sandown	Exeter	Windsor Boys'
Open J15 4x+	Windsor Boys'	Guildford	Hinksey
Women J18 1x	Edinburgh	Wycliffe	Hollingworth Lake
Women J18 2-	NCRA	Newark	Hinksey
Women J18 2x	Claires Court	Warrington	Wycliffe
Women J18 4x	Henley	Lea	Bewl Bridge; Peterborough City
Women J18 4-	Aberdeen Schools	Weybridge	Henley
Women J18 8+	Hinksey	Henley	Kingston Grammar; Molesey
Women J16 1x	Shanklin Sandown	Henley	Evesham
Women J16 2-	Glasgow Academy	Henley	Calpe
Women J16 2x	Marlow	Sir William Perkin's	George Watson's
Women J16 4+	Glasgow Academy; George Watson's	Henley	Sir William Perkin's
Women J16 4x	Henley	Globe	Maidenhead
Women J15 1x	Tyne	AB Severn	Falcon
Women J15 2x	Globe	Kingston	Wallingford
Women J15 4x+	Marlow	Trentham	Kingston
Women J14 1x	Clydesdale	Wallingford	Aberdeen Schools
Women J14 2x	AB Severn	City of Bristol	Gloucester
Women J14 4x+	Hexham	Henley	Maidenhead

Key
Symbol	meaning
1, 2, 4, 8	crew size
+	coxed
-	coxless
x	sculls
14	Under-14
15	Under-15
16	Under-16
18	Under-18
