= List of rowing blades – National team oars =

The table below shows the way the rowing blades are painted in international competitions of rowing in which national teams participate. Each team associated with the International Rowing Federation uses a specific model. This pattern may be a reproduction of the national flag on the oar blade, but it may also be a fanciful motif chosen by a given rowing federation. The left oar is usually a mirror image of the right oar.

Blade	Nation	Description
Afghanistan	Afghanistan	Colours of flag of Afghanistan, without the Emblem of Afghanistan.
Albania	Albania	Similar to the civil ensign of Albania.
Algeria	Algeria	Flag of Algeria.
American Samoa	American Samoa	Flag of American Samoa, but with a different arrangement and without the emblem.
Angola	Angola	Flag of Angola.
Argentina	Argentina	Flag of Argentina, but with white stripe vertical.
Armenia	Armenia	Flag of Armenia.
Australia	Australia	White blade with green, yellow, and green strips running vertically across the blade, near the tip.
Austria	Austria	Flag of Austria.
Azerbaijan	Azerbaijan	Flag of Azerbaijan.
Bahamas	Bahamas	Flag of the Bahamas.
Bahrain	Bahrain	Flag of Bahrain.
Bangladesh	Bangladesh	white/light blue blade.
Barbados	Barbados	Transformed flag of Barbados.
Belarus	Belarus	Flag of Belarus.
Belgium	Belgium	Flag of Belgium.
Benin	Benin	Flag of Benin.
Bermuda	Bermuda	Flag of Bermuda, without the coat of arms.
Bolivia	Bolivia	Flag of Bolivia with the coat of arms.
Bosnia-Herzegovina	Bosnia-Herzegovina	Flag of Bosnia-Herzegovina.
Botswana	Botswana	Flag of Botswana.
Brazil	Brazil	White with vertical stripes: yellow-green-yellow-green.
Bulgaria	Bulgaria	Flag of Bulgaria, but stripes are vertical.
Burkina Faso	Burkina Faso	Flag of Burkina Faso.
Cameroon	Cameroon	Flag of Cameroon.
Canada	Canada	Flag of Canada.
Cape Verde	Cape Verde	Flag of Cape Verde.
Cayman Islands	Cayman Islands	Light blue blade.
Chile	Chile	A blue blade with a white star and a red and white stripe.
China	China	White blade and red bow with 5 yellow stars.
Colombia	Colombia	Flag of Colombia, but the stripes are vertical..
Costa Rica	Costa Rica	Civil flag of Costa Rica.
Croatia	Croatia	White blade with red checkers in top right corner. Based on Croatian coat of arms.
Cuba	Cuba	blade with 3 stripes: red, white and blue.
Cyprus	Cyprus	Flag of Cyprus.
Czech Republic	Czechia	Flag of Czechia.
Denmark	Denmark	White blade with red horizontal stripe.
Djibouti	Djibouti	Flag of Djibouti.
Dominican Republic	Dominican Republic	The layout is similar to the flag of the Dominican Republic, but without coat of arms.
Ecuador	Ecuador	Flag of Ecuador without the coat of arms.
Egypt	Egypt	Flag of Egypt, without the coat of arms.
Salvador	El Salvador	White blade with 5 vertical blue stripes.
Estonia	Estonia	Flag of Estonia.
Eswatini	Eswatini	A blue blade with two white stripes at the end.
Fiji	Fiji	A white blade with a black vertical stripe in front of the tip.
Finland	Finland	Flag of Finland.
France	France	Flag of France.
Georgia	Georgia	Flag of Georgia.
Germany	Germany	Flag of Germany.
Ghana	Ghana	Flag of Ghana.
Gibraltar	Gibraltar	A white blade with a red stripe at the tip.
Great Britain	Great Britain	White blade with red tip with Union Flag.
Greece	Greece	Blue blade with white cross, part of Greece's coat of arms.
Guatemala	Guatemala	White blade with 2 vertical, wide, blue stripes.
Haiti	Haiti	Flag of Haiti.
Honduras	Honduras	A blue blade with a white sash across and the stars of the Honduran flag.
Hong Kong	Hong Kong	A slightly altered Flag of Hong Kong.
Hungary	Hungary	Flag of Hungary.
Iceland	Iceland	Flag of Iceland without vertical stripes.
India	India	Two horizontal stripes: light sky blue and dark blue.
Indonesia	Indonesia	Two vertical stripes: white and red.
Iraq	Iraq	Flag of Iraq.
Iran	Iran	Simplified flag of Iran.
Ireland	Ireland	Green blade with a white clover.
Finland	Israel	Two horizontal stripes: blue and white.
Italy	Italy	Flag of Italy.
Ivory Coast	Ivory Coast	A white blade with orange, white and green stripes at the tip.
Jamaica	Jamaica	Flag of Jamaica.
Japan	Japan	Flag of Japan plus two diagonal red stripes.
Jordan	Jordan	Flag of Jordan.
Kazakhstan	Kazakhstan	A blue blade with a yellow tip and a diagonal red stripe.
Kenya	Kenya	A white blade with black, white and red stripes on the tip.
Kuwait	Kuwait	Flag of Kuwait.
Kyrgystan	Kyrgyzstan	Flag of Kyrgyzstan.
Latvia	Latvia	Flag of Latvia.
Lebanon	Lebanon	Flag of Lebanon.
Libya	Libya	Flag of Libya.
Lithuania	Lithuania	Flag of Lithuania.
Luxembourg	Luxembourg	Appearance similar to the coat of arms of Luxembourg.
Madagascar	Madagascar	Flag of Madagascar.
Malawi	Malawi	Flag of Malawi.
Malaysia	Malaysia	A variation using the colors and emblem of the flag of Malaysia.
Maldives	Maldives	Flag of Maldives.
Mali	Mali	Flag of Mali.
Malta	Malta	Flag of Malta.
Mauritius	Mauritius	Flag of Mauritius.
Mexico	Mexico	A green blade with a white and red stripe at the tip.
Morocco	Morocco	Flag of Morocco with a simplified star.
Moldova	Moldova	Flag of Moldova, but horizontally and without the coat of arms.
Monaco	Monaco	A red blade with a narrow horizontal white stripe.
Mongolia	Mongolia	Flag of Mongolia.
Mozambique	Mozambique	Flag of Mozambique without the emblem.
Myanmar	Myanmar	A white blade with blue-white-red stripes on the tip.
Namibia	Namibia	Flag of Namibia.
Nepal	Nepal	A variation using the colors and emblems of the Nepalese flag.
Netherlands	Netherlands	Flag of the Netherlands.
New Zealand	New Zealand	Black blade with silver fern and letters N and Z on either side of the silver fern.
Nicaragua	Nicaragua	Flag of Nicaragua, without the coat of arms.
Niger	Niger	Flag of Niger.
Nigeria	Nigeria	Flag of Nigeria with changed proportions.
North Korea	North Korea	White blade and selected elements from the North Korean flag.
North Macedonia	North Macedonia.	Flag of North Macedonia.
Norway	Norway	Flag of Norway without the vertical stripes.
Pakistan	Pakistan	blade with 3 horizontal stripes: dark green/white/dark green.
Palestine	Palestine	Flag of Palestine.
Panama	Panama	White blade with a navy blue star and a red one.
Paraguay	Paraguay	A variation using the colors of the Paraguayan flag.
Peru	Peru	A red blade with a diagonal wide white stripe.
Philippines	Philippines	Red and blue blade with a large white chevron.
Poland	Poland	Flag of Poland.
Portugal	Portugal	A white blade with a green and red stripe at the tip.
Puerto Rico	Puerto Rico	Simplified Flag of Puerto Rico (fewer stripes).
Qatar	Qatar	Flag of Qatar
Romania	Romania	Flag of Romania.
Russia	Russia	Flag of Russia.
Saint Vincent and Grenadines	Saint Vincent and the Grenadines	Flag of Saint Vincent and the Grenadines.
Samoa	Samoa	Flag of Samoa.
Saudi Arabia	Saudi Arabia	Flag of Saudi Arabia.
Senegal	Senegal	Flag of Senegal.
Serbia	Serbia	Colors from the flag of Serbia, but in a different arrangement.
Singapore	Singapore	White and red blade divided diagonally.
Slovakia	Slovakia	Colors and coat of arms from the flag of Slovakia, but in a different arrangement.
Slovenia	Slovenia	A white blade with a transverse stripe in the colors of the Slovenian flag.
Somalia	Somalia	Flag of Somalia.
South Africa	South Africa	Flag of South Africa.
Korea	South Korea	Elements from the flag of South Korea with a changed color scheme.
Spain	Spain	Flag of Spain, but stripes are vertical.
Sri Lanka	Sri Lanka	An orange blade with a diagonal wide black stripe.
Sudan	Sudan	Flag of Sudan.
Sweden	Sweden	Coat of Arms of Sweden.
Switzerland	Switzerland	Flag of Switzerland.
Syria	Syria	Flag of Syria.
Thailand	Thailand	Flag of Thailand.
Chinese Taipei	Chinese Taipei	Horizontal 3 stripes: navy blue-white-red with a variation of the Chinese Taipei symbol.
Togo	Togo	Flag of Togo.
Tonga	Tonga	A white blade with an altered flag of Tonga.
Trinidad and Tobago	Trinidad and Tobago	Flag of Trinidad and Tobago.
Tunisia	Tunisia	Flag of Tunisia.
Turkey	Türkiye	A white blade with a stripe with the Turkish Flag on the tip.
Turkmenistan	Turkmenistan	Colors and emblem of the flag of Turkmenistan, but a different arrangement.
Uganda	Uganda	Three horizontal stripes in the colors of the flag of Uganda.
Ukraine	Ukraine	Flag of Ukraine.
United Arab Emirates	United Arab Emirates	Flag of the United Arab Emirates.
United States	United States	Colors from the US Flag, but in a different arrangement.
Uruguay	Uruguay	Blue blade.
Uzbekistan	Uzbekistan	Flag of Uzbekistan, but without the emblem and slightly different colors.
Vanuatu	Vanuatu	Flag of Vanuatu, without the emblem.
Venezuela	Venezuela	Flag of Venezuela without the emblem.
Vietnam	Vietnam	Flag of Vietnam with an inverted star.
Zambia	Zambia	Flag of Zambia.
Zimbabwe	Zimbabwe	A variation using the colors of the flag of Zimbabwe.

== See also ==
- Club oars
- List of rowing blades
