= City of Cambridge Rowing Club =

Rowing and sculling club in Cambridge, UK

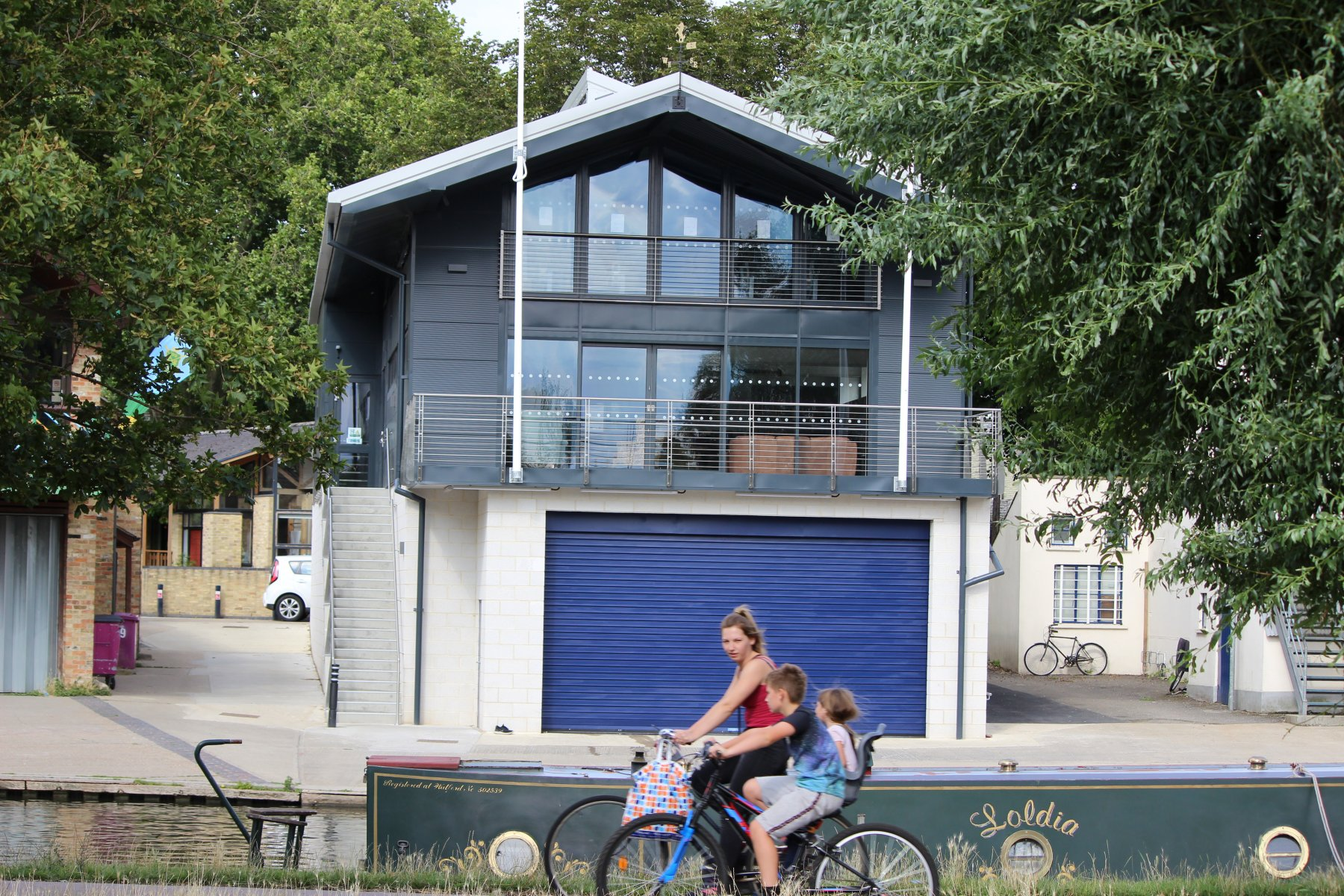

- Location: Cambridge, United Kingdom
- Coordinates: 52°12′41.7″N 0°7′48″E
- Home water: River Cam
- Founded: 1844
- Membership: 300 (approx)
- Affiliations: British Rowing (boat code CAM); Cambridgeshire Rowing Association
- Website: www.cityrc.co.uk

Events
- CRA Winter League; Christmas Head; Winter & Spring Head to Head; City Sprints

Distinctions
- Ten Successive Town Bumps Men's Headships; Winners at 2010 Henley Women's

City of Cambridge Rowing Club (CCRC) is the oldest 'town' (or CRA) rowing and sculling club in Cambridge, UK, and with about 300 members, it has one of the largest active rowing memberships in the region. The club's colours are dark blue, with a band of claret sandwiched between two bands of 'old gold'.

Second to Rob Roy Boat Club in terms of overall success, the club has one of the most successful historic records in town rowing as the only club to hold the men's headship for ten successive years (between 1951 and 1961), and its recent record includes winning the John Jenner trophy as the most successful club in Town Bumps for four successive years (2007, 2008, 2009, 2010), with its women having reached "Head of the River" in 2008. The club also won the Lester Trophy (for Intermediate Club Coxed Fours) at Henley Women's Regatta in 2010. The club has yet to achieve success above this level, however aspires to do so.

The club has squads for all ages and abilities, including juniors, men, women, masters and novices.

== Facilities ==
The club was the first Cambridge town rowing club to build its own boathouse on the banks of the River Cam, and it is still based at the same site, in the main row of boathouses opposite Midsummer Common. Many local CRA races are run from this clubhouse. In July 2019, the club opened a new 3 storey boathouse, giving it the newest town club boathouse on the river Cam. The new boat house has a large boat bay on the ground floor, club room and changing rooms on the first floor and gym on the top floor.

The club has a large fleet of racing shells and training boats, with a mixture of 8's, 4+/-/x and small boats. The club's boats have ARA alphanumeric registration codes starting with the letters "CAM" followed by three digits.

== Racing ==
The club competes all year round at local CRA races on the River Cam, at regional regattas and head races such as those at Peterborough, Bedford and Norwich, and at major national events including Men's and Women's Tideway Head of the River Races, Henley Women's Regatta, Henley Royal Regatta and the National Championships. Club crews also occasionally compete at international events such as the Head of the Charles, the Galway Head and FISA Masters.

The biggest race in the local calendar is the CRA Bumps (or "town bumps") in which almost all club members participate. In 2008, the women's squad reached first position ("Head") in this race.

=== CCRC Events ===
The club hosts and runs several local rowing races on the River Cam, including the CRA Winter League (a "league" event run over the Cam Head Course over three successive months), the Head 2 Head races (where the standard Head Course is rowed twice in quick succession; first downstream and then, minutes later, in the more usual upstream direction) in spring and winter, the CCRC Sprint Regatta (a short ~400 m side-by-side sprint regatta outside the boathouses along Midsummer Common) and the Christmas Head (an upstream race past most of the boathouses).

== History ==
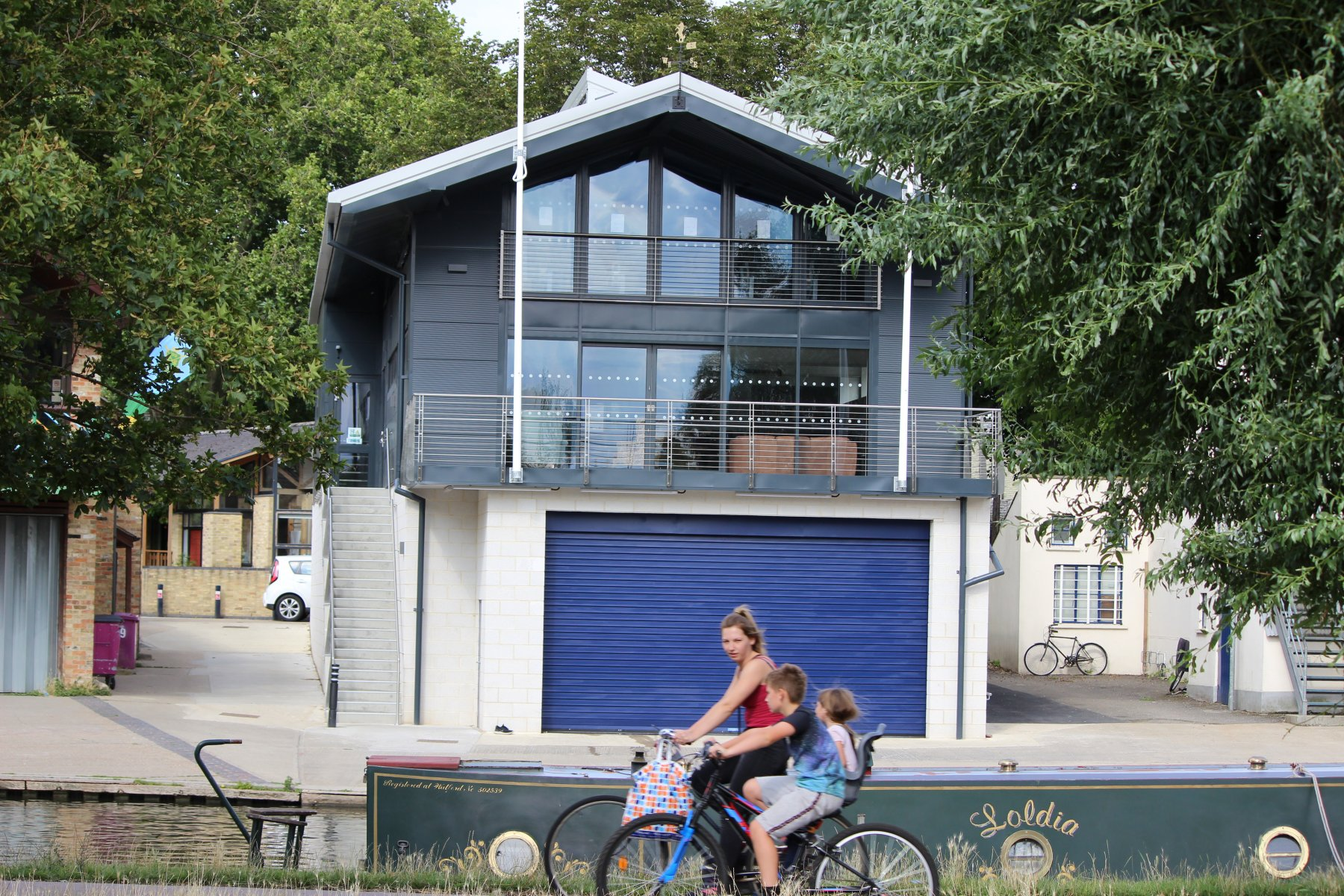
City boathouse.

City of Cambridge is the oldest town rowing club on the Cam. Early records show the existence of the 'Cambridge Boat Racing Club' in 1844, the largest contingent of which went on to become the 'Cambridge Town Rowing Club' in 1863. The Town club was formed by John Harvey in the working men's club that used to be on Market Hill; this formed the core of what became CCRC in 1932. The club's colours are dark blue, Claret and Old Gold.

Records are scarce for the first part of the twentieth century, with results in both the Bumps and the Eight's Head on the Thames existing from the late 1940s onwards. In 1953 the first eight finished 53rd on the Thames and held the headship in the Town Bumps. In the same year, the club's 90th anniversary, the first Town regatta was run on the Cam. The course ran from the Pike and Eel all the way down the long reach and round to the Plough. The Cambridge Daily News reported that R. Evans of St Neots was disqualified for knocking M. Clay of Nottingham and Union into the river during their singles race. Clay appeared to collect the trophy 'soaked to the skin, his hair on end and in bare feet'. The City Sprints are now held in front of the boat houses over a shorter course.

City purchased the freehold to the boathouse in 1959 and in 1963 celebrated its official centenary by opening its new boathouse. In July 2019, the club opened a new 3 storey boathouse, giving it the largest town club boathouse on the river Cam.

=== Bumps Racing ===
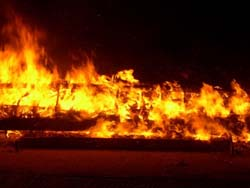
The traditional boat burning in celebration of the women's headship in 2008

University Bumps races had been held from the 1820s onwards but the town bumps only really took shape with the formation of the CRA (Cambridgeshire Rowing Association) in 1868. City were head of the river in the Town Bumps in 1875 but performed poorly until 1914 when they reached third place. In 1949 the 1st boat won their blades and in 1951 they were head of the river for the first time since the headship was lost in the 1870s. They retained the headship for the next 6 years and in 1958 had the chance to equal Rob Roy's record of 8 consecutive headships (set from 1904 to 1911).

In the buildup to the 1958 Bumps, Robs and City posted identical times in the 'Timed Race'. On the first night of the Bumps proper Robs caught 99's to go second and leave themselves three nights to catch City. But for all their endeavour Robs could not bump a determined City crew and the record was equalled. City went on to retain the headship for a further two years and a new record of 10 consecutive years of Headship was thus set by City before they were eventually toppled in 1962 by 99's.

=== British champions ===
Year	Winning crew/s
1986	Women 8+
1989	Men J18 4-
1992	Men 8+
