= Bath University Boat Club =

Rowing club in England

- Location: Newbridge, Bath
- Coordinates: 51.391865°N 2.407592°W
- Home water: River Avon
- Founded: 1967
- University: University of Bath
- Colours
- Affiliations: British Rowing (boat code BAU); Meles Boat Club (Alumni Club)
- Website: www.thesubath.com/rowing/ www.bubcalumni.com
- Acronym: BUBC

Bath University Boat Club (BUBC) is the rowing club for the University of Bath, England. The club is based in Bath, England, on the River Avon.

== History ==
Bath University Boat Club was founded in 1967, a year after the University of Bath was established, and is the University's oldest sports club. The club initially rowed from Avon County Rowing Club, in Saltford, before moving to Bradford-on-Avon.

In 1988, BUBC joined Minerva Bath Rowing Club, at their boathouse in Bathampton, and together the two clubs purchased a boat, called The Jolly Rodger.

BUBC moved back to Avon County from 1997 until 2002, when the Boat Club reunited with Minerva Bath. The two clubs then moved together to the current site in 2005, where they have since built two boathouses.

The club has recorded wins at the Henley Women's Regatta and has produced several national championship crews.

== Training ==
=== Boathouse ===
Bath University Boat Club shares facilities with the Minerva Bath Rowing Club, at their Newbridge site.

=== Other facilities ===
Since 2004, the Boat Club has also trained at the indoor rowing facilities of the University's Sports Training Village.

== Honours ==
=== British champions ===
Year	Winning crew/s
2009	Women U23 2x
2011	Women U23 2x
2024	Women 2x
2025	Women 2x

== Alumni ==
=== Notable alumni ===
- Becky Wilde: Bronze at the Paris 2024 Olympics in the Women's Double Scull.
- Jamie Gare and Cedol Dafydd: Winners of the Double Sculls Challenge Cup at Henley Royal Regatta 2024 as well as Cedol (who learnt to row at Bath) representing GB at the Rowing World Cup III.
- Heather Stanning: Olympic champion in the Women's Pair with Helen Glover (also from Bath) at the London 2012 and Rio 2016 Olympic Games.
- Marcus Bateman: Learned at Bath University. World Silver Medalist in Double scull 2010. Men's sweep spare for London 2012 Olympic Games.
- Adam Freeman: Took 6th place in the World Championships in Lightweight Single Scull. Lightweight men's sculling spare for London 2012 Olympic Games.
- Sam Courty: Bronze in the 2015 World U23 Championships in Bulgaria, recently qualified GB Women's Pair for Tokyo 2020 Olympic Games.
- Sara Parfett: Recently qualified GB Women's Four for Tokyo 2020 Olympic Games.
- Frazier Christie: Semi-finalist in the World U23 Championships 2015.

=== Meles Boat Club ===
Meles Boat Club is an affiliated British Rowing club, founded in 2003 to give BUBC alumni the opportunity to race alongside current students.

The club's name, Meles, is the classical Latin word for a badger, and honours the famous Badgerline Buses that preceded the current university bus service.
