= Globe Rowing Club =

British rowing club

- Location: Greenwich, London, England
- Coordinates: 51.487°N 0.001°E
- Home water: The Tideway (River Thames) and Royal Docks, North Woolwich
- Founded: 1923
- Affiliations: British Rowing boat code: GLB
- Website: www.globerowingclub.co.uk

Globe Rowing Club is a community rowing club in Greenwich in the South East of London, England. Established in 1923, the club house and boat house are based on Crane Street in the historic centre of Greenwich, as part of the Trafalgar Rowing Trust. Its crews use the River Thames and the London Regatta Centre at the Royal Docks for water outings. The club admits male and female rowers of all ages, but is particularly known for its high performance junior programme although its senior programme has made major headway in recent times.

== History ==
The rowing club was originally established at J. Stone & Co's engineering works in Deptford's Arklow Road and was called Stones Rowing Club, with membership restricted to company employees.

In the first years after the club was established, the boats used were heavy Clinker fours, hired from a local waterman in East Greenwich and were used mainly on Sunday mornings. This was found to be cost prohibitive and, in time, the club applied to Stone's engineering works for a grant to purchase new equipment. This was refused, and as a result the club broke away from the works and set up independently to attract new members from elsewhere, with headquarters in the nearby Lord Clyde public house (western end of Clyde Street). The club was hence known as the Clyde Rowing Club.

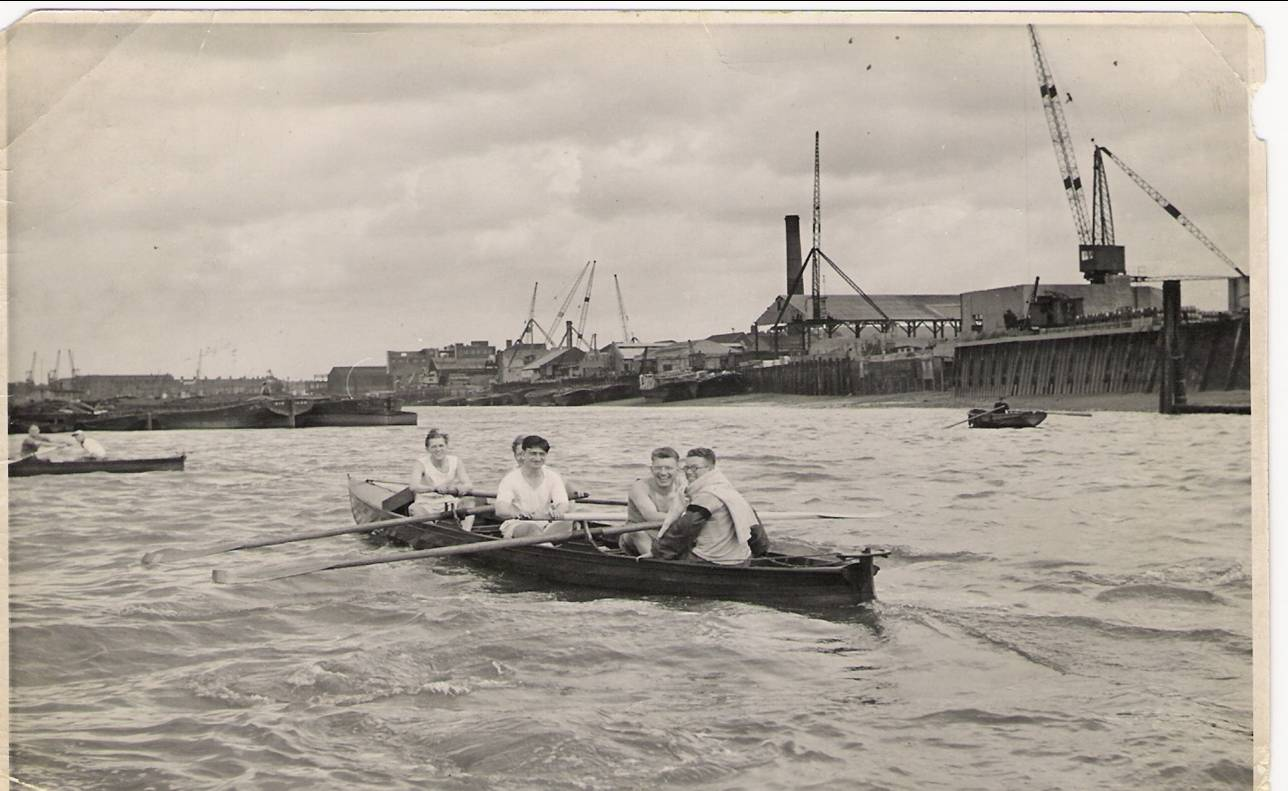
Globe Rowing Club – Coxed Clinker Four on the Tideway – date unknown

During the mid-1930s, the headquarters were moved to another public house, The Globe on Royal Hill in Greenwich (demolished c. 1938), from which the rowing club took its current name, Globe Rowing Club. The club also had a headquarters (1947) at the nearby Mitre public house in Greenwich; and for a time used a decommissioned landing craft moored opposite the Union Tavern (today The Cutty Sark) at Ballast Quay.

Globe was only the second club in East London after Curlew Rowing Club to hold club regattas, with the earliest taking place shortly after the end of the Second World War, the participants being watermen working on nearby Thames shuttles and barges. The club was also the first rowing club in East London to use an eight.

In August 1981, members of Globe Rowing Club set a Guinness World Record for "The greatest distance for paddling a hand propelled bath tub in 24 hr...by a team of 25" The record distance set was "60 miles 88 yd".

In 2006, Greenwich Council granted permission, with contributions from Sport England, and the Trafalgar 2001 Trust Ltd for the club to develop the facilities on the corner of Crane Street and Eastney Street, creating a heated, lit boathouse, indoor training room and clubhouse known as the Trafalgar Rowing Centre.

In the early 2010s, Globe's Junior section began a partnership with non-profit organisation London Youth Rowing, to bring indoor and water rowing to increase participation in the sport and allow those from disadvantaged backgrounds to participate. Many of the junior members who have gone on to achieve national and international rowing success have done so as a result of the partnership with LYR.

After the pandemic, in 2020, Globe hired Maurice Coughlan who had previously only worked with the Junior Squad as an external coach to be their Director of Rowing. In the next few years, a performance squad was founded for the seniors leading to several Henley Royal Regatta and Henley Women's Regatta qualifications and the junior success continuing culminating in the winning of the Nina Padwick Trophy at HWR in 2022.

In 2022 Globe won its first Henley Women's Regatta title in the Nina Padwick Trophy (WJ16 4x-).

In 2025 the club went on to win its outright senior open weight British Rowing Championships in the Club coxless fours. Globe had formally had success in lightweight events in the late 90s.

== Honours ==
The club has won ten gold medals at the British Rowing Championships alongside a number of silvers an bronzes over the years. The Junior section of Globe Rowing Club achieved national and international attention in the 2015–2018 quadrennium for a series of national and international medal wins and the unprecedented inclusion of 6 junior globe members in the Great British rowing trial squad.

=== British champions ===
Year	Winning crew/s
1998	Women L2-
1999	Women L4-
2001	Women L2-
2002	Women 8+ (Composite crew with Thames, Wallingford and London)
2004	Women 2- (Composite crew with Thames RC)
2014	Women J15 2x
2017	Open J15 1x
2018	Open J16 2x
2022	Open J15 2x
2025	Open Club 4-

Other results include

- 2017 Henley Royal Regatta – Junior Men's 4x qualify to the heats of the Fawley Challenge Cup and beat Lea Rowing Club
- 2019: Metropolitan Regatta: Op1x win (Tadas Svetikas)
- 2021: Henley Royal Regatta: Wyfold Challenge Cup 4- prequalification and win vs Broxborune RC (Heat)
- 2022: Henley Women's Regatta: Winners of the Nina Padwick Trophy JW16 4x-
- 2024: Henley Women's Regatta: Chairman's Trophy W4x- win vs Bournemouth University BC (Heat)
- 2024: Home International Regatta: WJ1x wins in A and B races and win in the JW4x-
- 2025: Marlow Regatta: The Town Cup: 4- Tier 2 Winners
- 2025: Henley Royal Regatta: Wyfold Challenge Cup 4- prequalification and win vs City of Bristol RC (Heat)

== Notable members ==
- Calum Sullivan – Gold and bronze at the 2021 World Rowing U23 Championships; president and crew member of the winning Cambridge crew in The Boat Race 2021, winning Cambridge crew in the Boat Race 2019, member of the winning Cambridge reserve boat crew in the Boat Race 2018, 2017 Coupe de la Jeunesse team member.
- Julia Olawumi - first rower from the club to commit to an NCAA Division 1 school for rowing choosing the University of Tulsa in Tulsa, Oklahoma.
