= Cambridgeshire Rowing Association =

Coordinates: 52°12′42.27″N 0°7′46.73″E

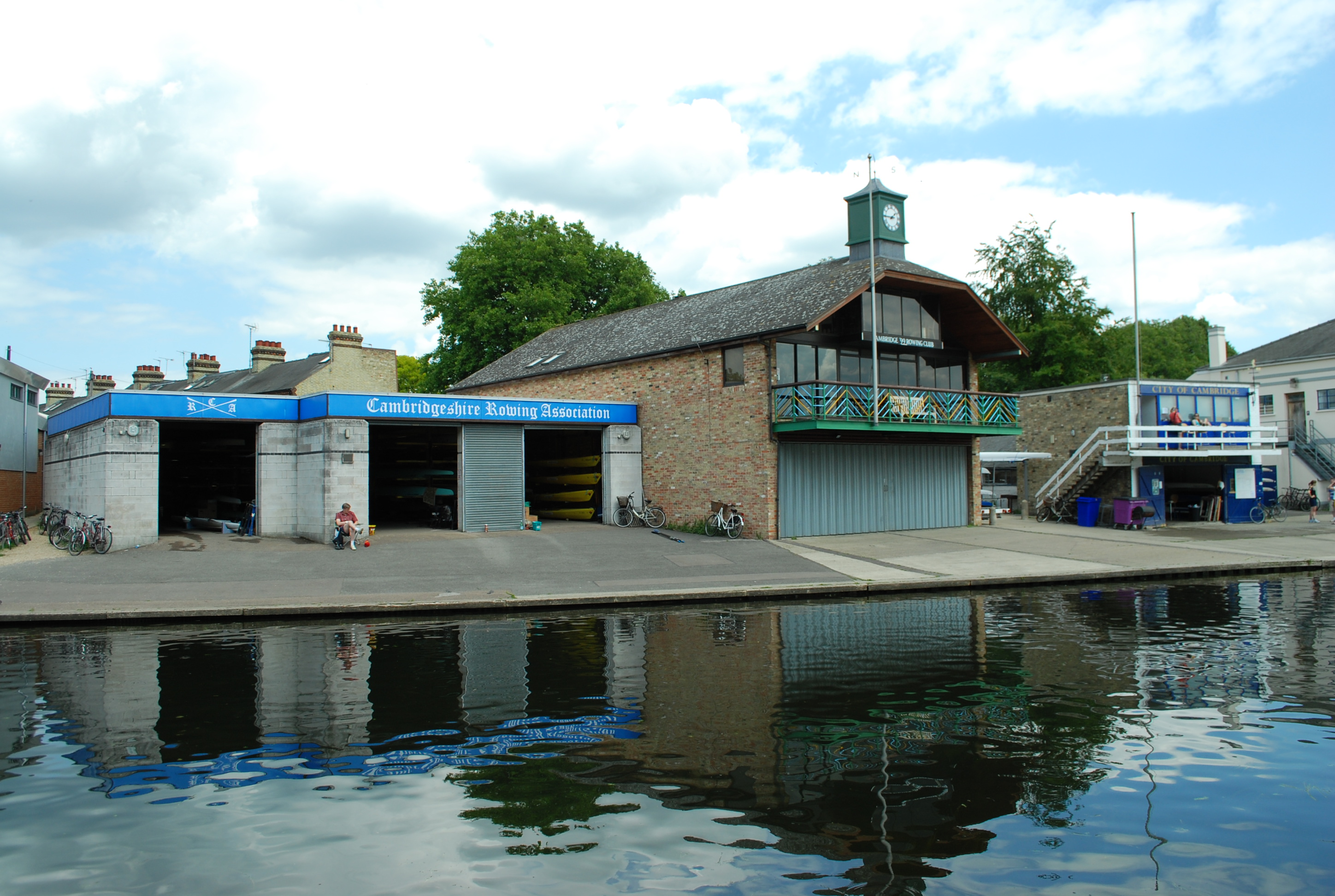
CRA boathouse (left)

The Cambridgeshire Rowing Association (CRA) is based in Cambridge, UK. It is the administrative body for non-college rowing in Cambridge and since 1868 has organised races such as the CRA Bumps as well as looking after the interests of local rowing by providing facilities and regular meetings to discuss issues.

== Affiliated Clubs ==
Club	Blade Colours
Within Cambridge
Cambridge '99 Rowing Club	Sky blue with yellow tip
Cantabrigian Rowing Club	Dark blue rowing blade with silver stripe
Cambridge Veterans	Dark blue - close to Oxford University blue
Champion of the Thames RC	
City of Cambridge Rowing Club	
Chesterton RC	White with diagonal sky blue, Oxford blue and yellow stripes
Granta Skiff Club (Fen Ditton)	
Hornets Boat Club	Black with two yellow stripes
The Leys School	
Rob Roy Boat Club	Maroon blades with diagonal white tip
St Radegund BC	Halved Orange and Red
X-Press Boat Club	Black with blue 'X' and white dots at tip
Outside Cambridge
Huntingdon Boat Club	
Isle of Ely Rowing Club	White with vertical Oxford and Cambridge blue tips
King's Ely	Sky blue with chequered blue stripe
Peterborough City Rowing Club	Blue with yellow diamond tip
St Ives Rowing Club	
St Neots Rowing Club	

== See also ==
- Cambridge University Boat Club
