= The Mitre, Greenwich =

Pub in Greenwich, London

The Mitre
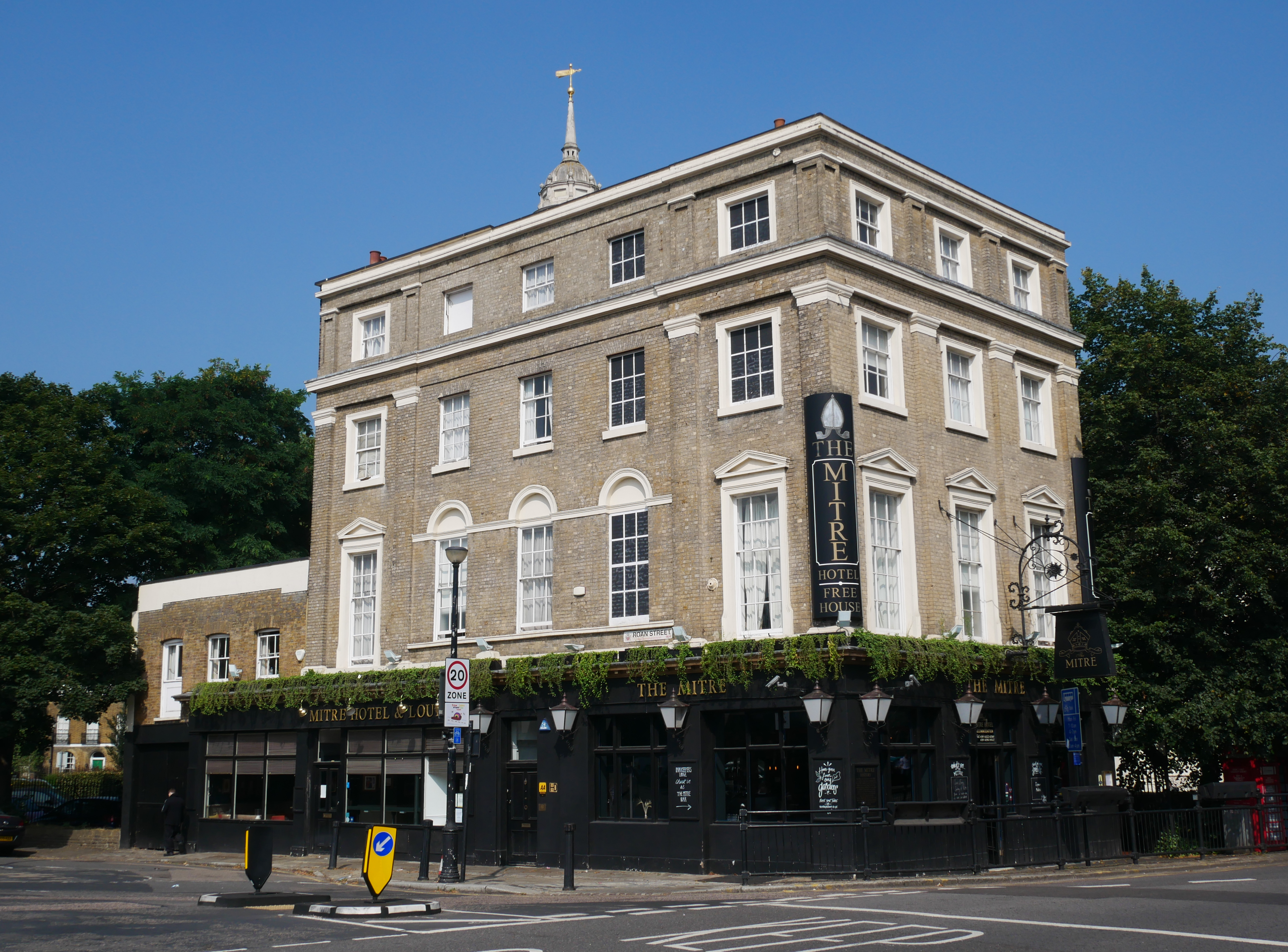
- The Mitre

- Location within Royal Borough of Greenwich Location within Greater London

General information
- Location: 291 Greenwich High Road, Greenwich, London, England
- Coordinates: 51°28′48″N 0°00′35″W

Design and construction
- Designations

Listed Building – Grade II
- Official name: The Mitre Public House
- Designated: 8 June 1973
- Reference no.: 1358973

The Mitre is a Grade II listed public house at 291 Greenwich High Road, Greenwich, London.

It was built around 1840.
