= Cantabrigian Rowing Club =

British rowing club

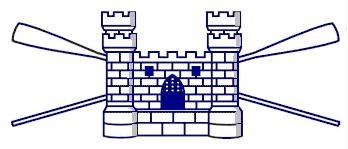

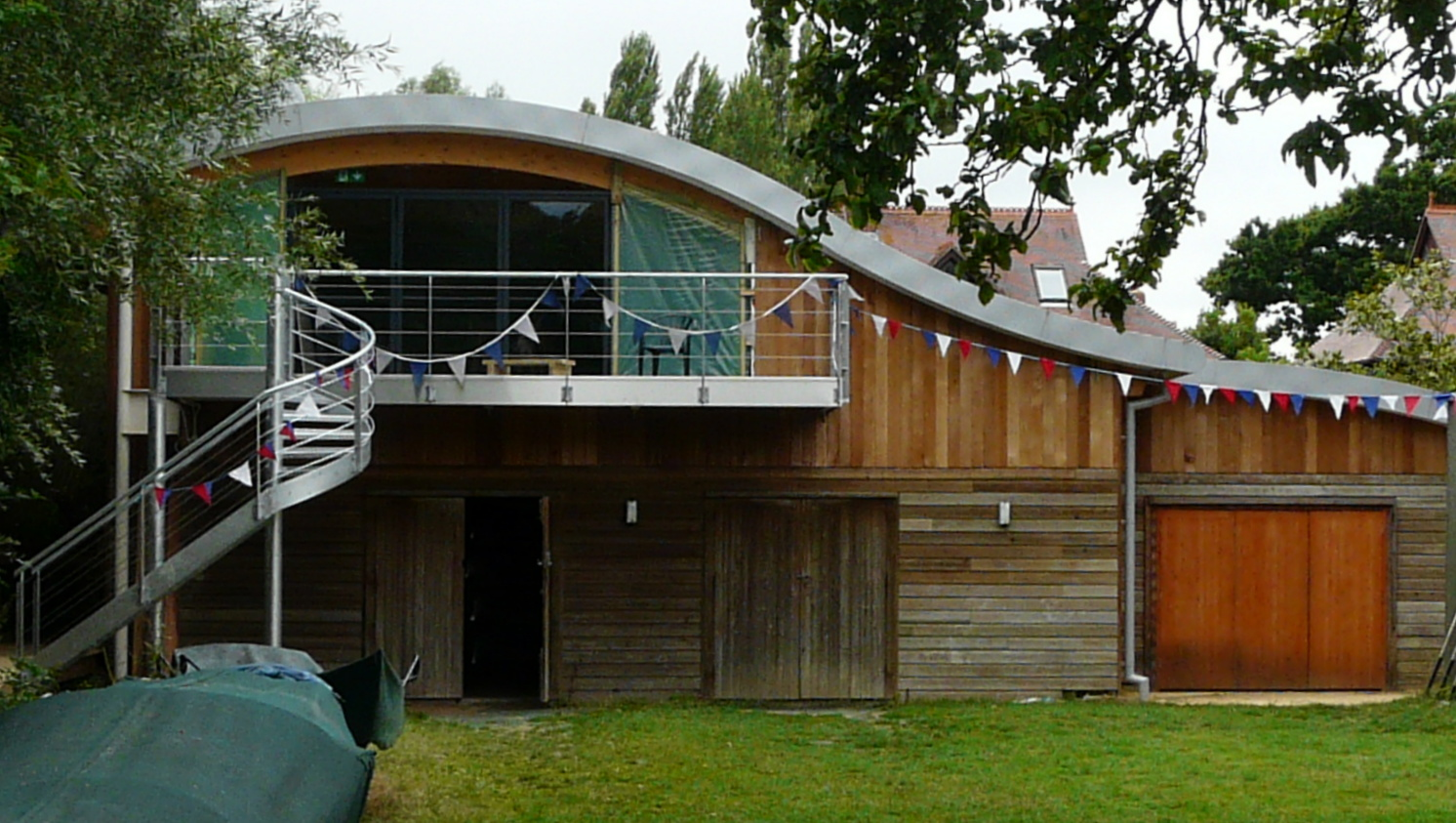

- Location: Cambridge, England
- Coordinates: 52°21′53″N 0°14′38″E
- Home water: River Cam
- Founded: 1950
- Affiliations: British Rowing boat code CAB; CRA
- Website: cantabsrowing.org.uk

Events
- Cambridge Winter Head

Distinctions
- Current or Former Town Bumps Men's and Women's Headship; Invesco Perpetual Challenge Cup - Henley Women's Regatta 2017; Provincial Pennant - Women's Eights Head of the River Race 2017, 2022 and 2024; Grosvenor Cup - Henley Women's Regatta 2015

Cantabrigian Rowing Club (/ˌkæntəˈbrɪdʒiən/), known as Cantabs, is a 'town' (or CRA) rowing and sculling club in Cambridge, England.

== History ==
Cantabs was founded in 1950 as a rowing club for the old boys of the Hills Road Sixth Form College, then the Cambridgeshire High School for Boys. It first accepted general membership in the 1960s and has been an open club since. The club is affiliated to the Cambridgeshire Rowing Association and British Rowing.

The club is consistently one of the fastest on the River Cam, holding the men's headship in the annual Town Bumps in 11 years since 2010, and the women's headship since 2017. The Cantabs Women's A crew consistently finish as the fastest Cambridge town club at the Women's Eights Head of the River Race, and finished 14th overall in 2017, winning the Provincial Pennant. Cantabs' B, C, D and E crews at WEHoRR were also faster than their counterparts from other Cambridge town clubs, and finished as the fastest B, C, D and E crews in the Provincial event. The Cantabs A crew won the Provincial Pennant again in 2022 and 2024.

The club runs the Cambridge Winter Head every November, an event that regularly attracts over seventeen hundred competitors, and is the largest one-day event on the Cam.

== Facilities ==
The club is based out of its own boat house in Chesterton on the banks of the River Cam. The boat house has a purpose-built indoor training space upstairs, with weights facilities installed in 2016, along with static and dynamic ergs, BikeErgs and a SkiErg. Rack space for boats ranging from single sculls to eights is located both downstairs and outside. The club also makes use of the CRA boat house and Fitzwilliam College boat house in Cambridge, primarily for Cantabs' large and vibrant junior squad and for adaptive rowing for people with disabilities.

Financial support for this development includes Olympic legacy funding from Sport England's Inspired Facilities Fund.

== Squads ==
The club is open to rowers, scullers and coxes of all ages, from the junior level up to masters level. Cantabs runs a number of different men's, women's and junior squads which cater for the social rower to those who wish to train and race competitively at a high level. There are a number of different squads which mean that different commitment levels and aspirations can be catered for.

The Senior Men's Squad has qualified at least one boat for Henley Royal Regatta in the majority of the last decade and in 2012 qualified two eights for the Thames Challenge Cup, a first for any Cambridge town club. In addition, there has been substantial individual success, with John Hale winning silver in the lightweight sculls at the 2012 British Rowing Championships before representing England in the lightweight double at the Home International Regatta and Charlie Palmer reaching the finals of the Diamond Challenge Sculls in 2005 and 2006. He is currently a biology teacher at Bedford School

The Senior Women's Squad races competitively at the major Tideway heads, as well as local and national regattas and, in 2015, two crews raced at Ghent International Regatta, with the women's pair winning their event (this pair went on to represent England at the Home International Regatta). Cantabs have had the fastest Cambridge town first and second eights at the Women's Eights Head of the River Race (WEHoRR) for the past few years, winning the Provincial Pennant when finishing 14th overall in 2017. Since the 2017 win the Cantabs Women's A crew has consistently placed in the top three Provincial Club crews every time that WEHoRR has run, including pennant wins in 2022 and 2024. In 2016, the senior squad won gold at the British Rowing Masters Championships in the women's A1x and C4-, won W.MasC.4+ at the Veteran Fours Head of the River, and won the IM1 pairs event at Pairs Head, where they were also the 2nd fastest W2- overall. In 2017, Cantabrigian won the Club 8+ event at Henley Women's Regatta, setting a new course record in the process. At Henley Royal Regatta, Cantabs have qualified an 8 for The Wargrave Challenge Cup each year since its inception.

The club has also had success with adaptive/para rowing, with Claire Connon winning the para event at Henley Women's Regatta in 2015, and representing England at the Home International Regatta on two occasions.

== Club colours ==
The blade colours are dark blue and silver; kit: white, trimmed with blue.

== Town bumps ==
Cantabs has held the Women's headship in the CRA Bumps since 2017 and the Men's Headship in 11 years since 2010. The other women's crews all hold higher positions than their equivalent crews from other clubs.

Since 2015, Cantabs has frequently entered the largest number of crews of any club in the CRA Bumps, reflecting the size of the club. In 2018, 16 men's and 11 women's crews took part, comprising 25% of the overall entry, with crews bumping up a 'net' of 35 places in addition to retaining the two Headships.

== Honours ==
=== Henley Royal Regatta ===
Year	Event won
1984	Thames Challenge Cup

=== British champions ===
Year	Winning crew/s
2005	Open 1x
2024	Women J15 2x

=== Women's Eights Head of the River Race ===
Year	Event won
2017	Provincial Club Pennant
2022	Provincial Club Pennant
2024	Provincial Club Pennant

=== Henley Women's Regatta ===
Year	Event Won
2015	The Grosvenor Cup (Para-Rowing Single Sculls)
2017	The Invesco Perpetual Challenge Cup (Club Eights)

== See also ==
- Cambridgeshire Rowing Association
