= Trent Rowing Club =

British rowing club

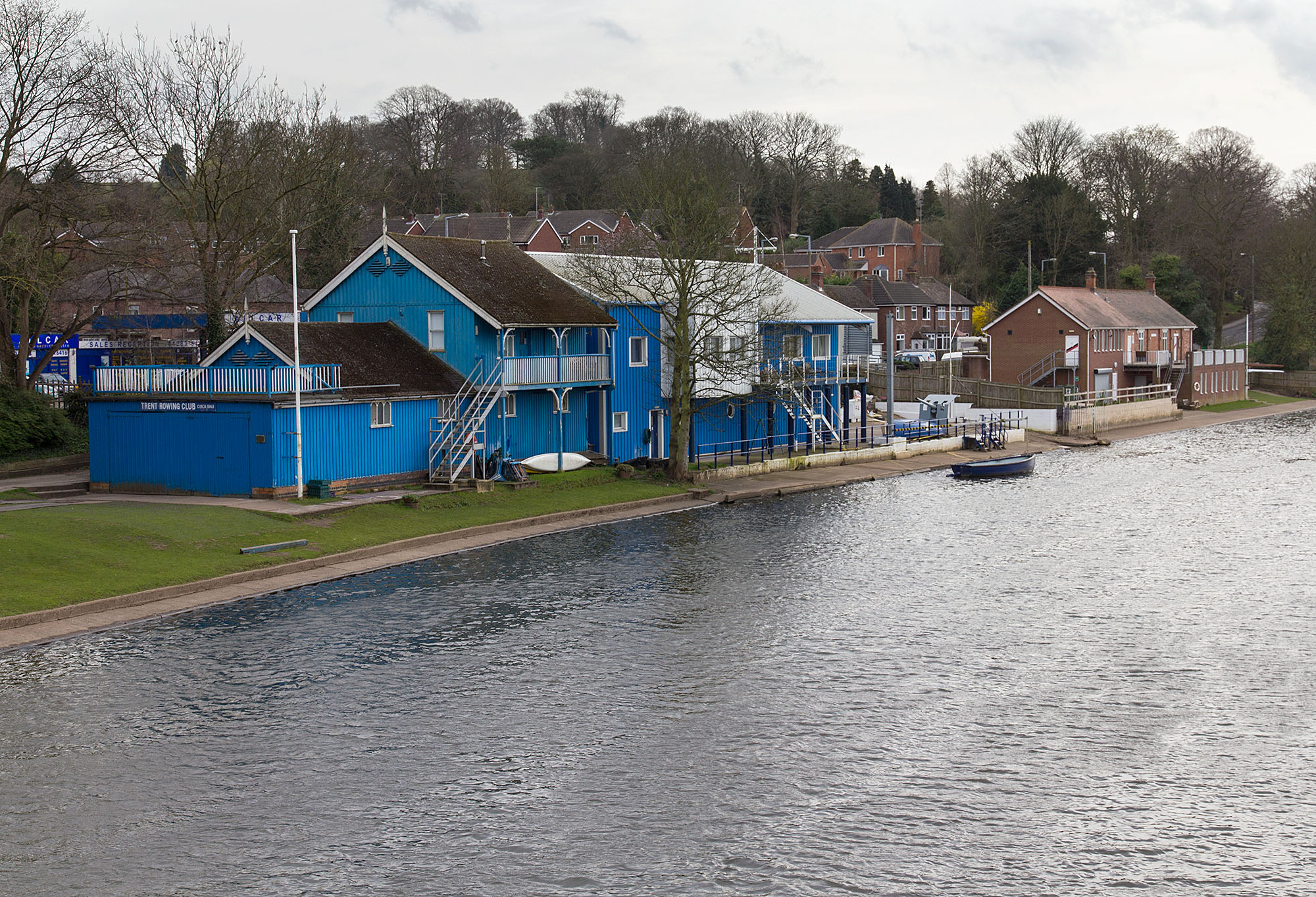

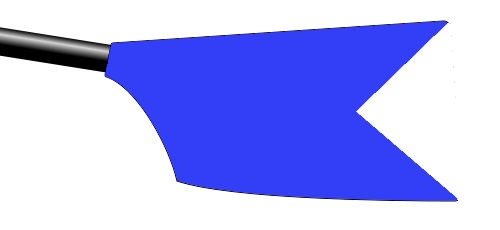
- Location: The Boathouse, Stapenhill Road, Burton upon Trent, Staffordshire, England
- Coordinates: 52.805089°N 1.619857°W
- Founded: 1863
- Affiliations: British Rowing (boat code TRT)
- Website: www.trentrc.org / www.britishrowing.org/club/trent-rc/

Trent Rowing Club is a rowing club on the River Trent, based at The Boathouse, Stapenhill Road, Burton upon Trent, Staffordshire, England.

== Club colours ==
The blade colours are royal blue with a white chevron; kit: royal blue with white crest or 2 diagonal hoops. The club is affiliated to British Rowing and has produced several British champions.

== History ==
The club was founded in 1863, although the Nottingham Trent Rowing Club pre-existed the club.

The amateur status dates back to 1863. The boathouse sits next door to rival club Burton Leander Rowing Club.

During May 1908 Trent BC coxswain John Plant drowned after being carried away by strong currents during a practice on the River Trent.

The club won titles at the 2024 British Rowing Championships and at the 2025 British Rowing Club Championships.

== Honours ==
=== British champions ===
Year	Winning crew/s
1989	Women J14 4x
1990	Men J14 2x
1991	Men J16 2x
2012	Open J18 2x
2024	Women J14 2x
2025	Women J15 2x
