= London Otters Rowing Club =

English Rowing club

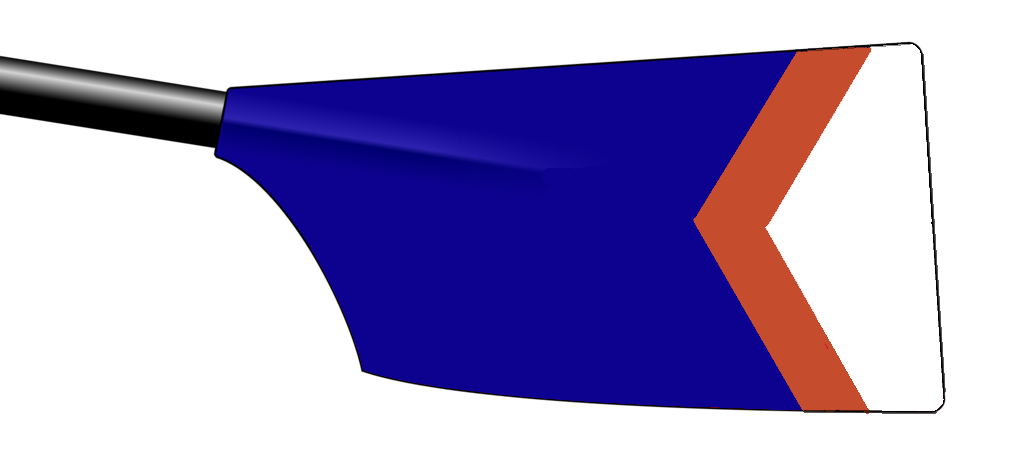
- Location: Docklands, London, U.K.
- Coordinates: 51.5077°N 0.0415°E
- Home water: River Thames
- Founded: 2014
- Affiliations: British Rowing boat code - LOT
- Website: www.londonotters.org
- Acronym: LORC

Events
- Gay Games; Rainbow Races

London Otters Rowing Club is an LGBT-friendly rowing club based at the London Regatta Centre in the Docklands area of London, U.K. on the River Thames.

== Structure ==
Rowing at the London Otters is structured within three squads: the Senior Squad with the greatest training commitment, including erg sessions, the Novice Squad for those with some rowing experience who wish to improve, and the Social Squad for competent rowers who do not wish to commit to regular training. Each squad is led by a captain and training is led by a coach.

New members must either have prior rowing experience or join via one of the club's Learn to Row courses, known within the club as 'Otterpups' courses.

The club is governed by a committee led by a chair, and overseen by a Board of Trustees.

== History ==
The club was founded in 2014 by friends Grant Ralph and Warwick Lobban, who struggled to find a club that would allow them to develop their rowing skills while being openly gay.

=== Gay Games ===
In 2018 the club sent 76 members to the 10th Gay Games in Paris, where they won 3 gold, 2 silver and 3 bronze medals.

In order to raise funds for the trip to Paris, members of the club rowed the 344 km distance from London to Paris on rowing machines.

=== Rainbow Races ===
In support of the Stonewall Rainbow Laces campaign, the club held a regatta at the London Regatta Centre in 2017, 2018 and 2019. Rowers race in coloured clothing to make the rainbow flag symbol.

=== London Pride Parade ===
The club was awarded the prize for Best Float after the 2019 Pride in London parade.
