= AB Severn Rowing Club =

English Rowing club

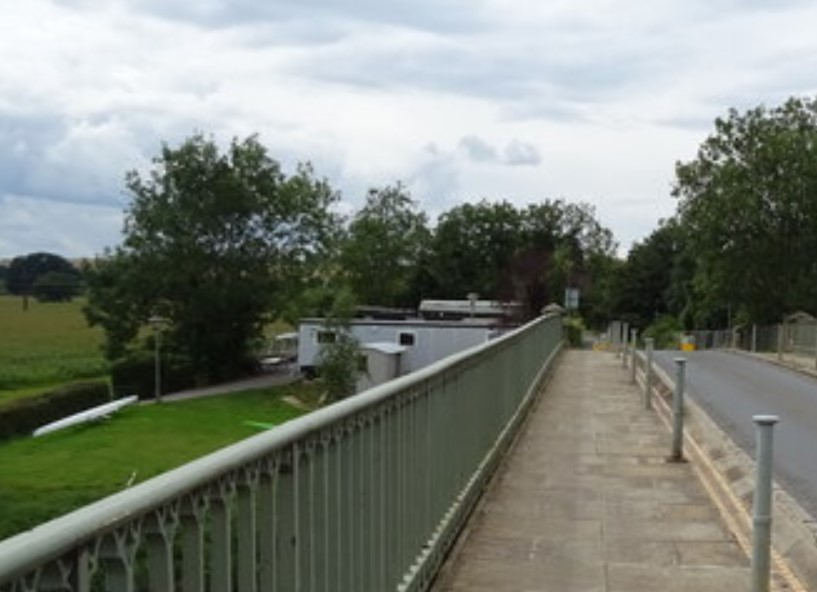

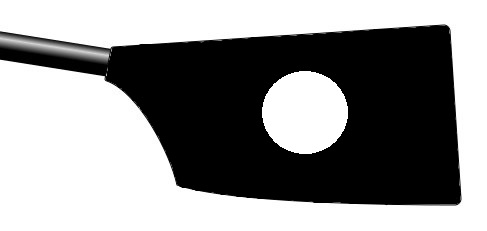
- Location: Mythe Bridge House, Ledbury Road, Tewkesbury, Gloucestershire GL20 6AA, England
- Coordinates: 52°00′07″N 2°09′52″W
- Home water: River Severn
- Affiliations: British Rowing boat code - ABV
- Website: www.absevern.com

AB Severn Rowing Club is a rowing club based in Tewkesbury, Gloucestershire, England. The home water is on the River Severn. The club focuses primarily on juniors aged 7 to 18.

== History ==
The club began to record success performing well at the 2015 British Rowing Junior Championships the 2015 Junior Inter-Regional Championships and the Henley Sculls in 2017. They also won the Victor ludorum at the 2015 Worcester Regatta.

The club produced British champions at the 2022 British Rowing Junior Championships and the 2024 British Rowing Championships.

== Honours ==
=== British champions ===
Year	Winning crew/s
2022	Women J14 2x
2024	Women J16 2x, Women J15 1x
2025	Open J14 2x
