= Hinksey Sculling School =

British rowing club

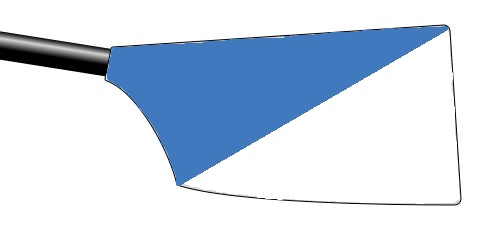
- Location: South Oxford Community Centre; Lake Street; Oxford; OX1 4RP
- Coordinates: 51.739020°N 1.256492°W
- Founded: 1998
- Affiliations: British Rowing boat code - HIN
- Website: www.hinkseysculling.org.uk

Hinksey Sculling School is a community rowing club on the River Thames for junior rowers. The club is unusual in the fact that it operates from three venues across Oxfordshire, England. The Sculling School runs as a charity in order to provide the facilities to the younger members, and it was founded as the United Kingdom's first community program for rowing.

The school's logo is a white swan. Mute Swans are a prominent fixture at Hinksey Lake in Oxford.

== Venues ==
The first and original venue is for the beginners and is situated at the South Oxford Community Centre in Lake Street, Oxford, with some training on Hinksey Lake in Hinksey Park. South Oxford Community Center/ Hinksey Lake venue is also used for regular friendly Learn to Row courses, organised during school holidays for all juniors, willing to discover rowing spirit.

The second venue (for club members aged in the 12 to 15 age bracket) used to be based at St Edward's School Boathouse on Godstow Road in Oxford, where it shared the boathouse with the St Edward's School Boat Club. As of June 2026, Hinksey have secured a new location, where juniors (J12 - J15) train from Christ Church College’s compound at Sandford lock.

The third and final venue (for club members aged in the 16 to 18 age bracket) is based at Radley College Boathouse in Lower Radley, Abingdon, where it shares the landing stage with the Radley College Boat Club.

== History ==
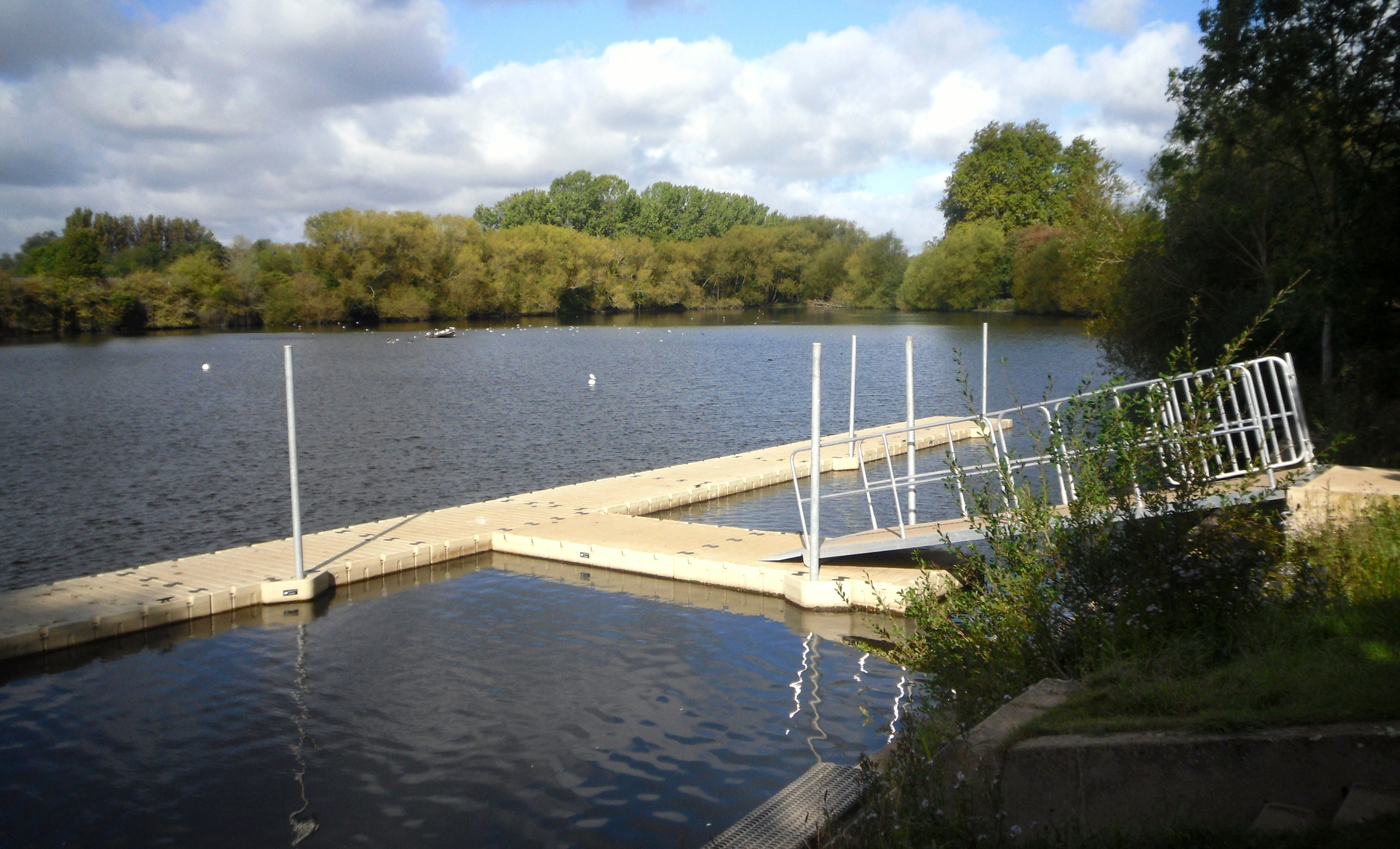
Hinksey Lake in 2011

The club was founded in February 1998 by John Broadhurst and Tom Collins and originally trained on the small Hinksey Lake before growing in size and then training the more experienced rowers at St Edward's and later Radley.

In recent years, the club has had success at the 2022 British Rowing Junior Championships and 2023 British Rowing Junior Championships, which included winning two gold medals. The club also participate at the Henley Royal Regatta and reached finals in 2021, 2023 and 2025.

Members have also won junior international honours at the World Junior Rowing Championships in 2022 and 2023, winning gold and silver medals. The 2023 Great Britain girl's eight was coached by former Hinksey's Director of Rowing, Bodo Schulenberg.

Alumni have gone on to join large successful British and American university rowing programmes, including Oxford University Boat Club, Cambridge University Boat Club, Newcastle University Boat Club, University of California Berkeley, Stanford University, Harvard University and Syracuse University.

== Honours ==
=== British champions ===
Year	Winning crew/s
2022	Open J16 2-, Women J18 8+
2023	Open J14 1x
2024	Open J18 1x, Open J18 2-, Open J18 4-
2025	Open 2x

=== National Schools Champions ===
Year	Winning crew/s
2022	Open J18 2-
2023	Colts Cup ChG.4-
2024	Aylings Challenge Cup ChG.8+

=== Henley Royal Regatta ===
Year	Crew/s
2021	Finalist, Britannia Challenge Cup
2023	Finalist, Fawley Challenge Cup
2025	Finalist, Fawley Challenge Cup
