= Clube Naval Infante D. Henrique =

Portuguese rowing club

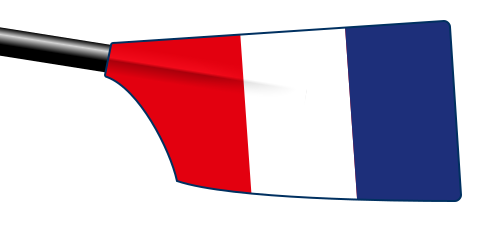
- Motto: Talant de bien faire
- Location: Valbom, Gondomar, Portugal
- Home water: Douro River
- Founded: 4 July 1925; 101 years ago
- Former names: Escola Naval Infante D. Henrique
- Membership: 172 registered rowers (2024–25)
- National club titles: 14
- Association: Portuguese Rowing Federation
- Website: www.cninfante.pt

Events
- Regata 25 de Abril; Regata Internacional de Gondomar; Aerobic Monsters – International Singles Regatta

Distinctions
- Taça Lisboa (2026)

Clube Naval Infante D. Henrique, commonly known as Infante, is a Portuguese rowing club based in Valbom, in the municipality of Gondomar. Founded on 4 July 1925, the club trains on the Douro River and participates in flat-water rowing, indoor rowing, coastal rowing and pararowing.

By 2025, Infante had won 14 Portuguese national club titles. In the 2024–25 season, it placed first in the Portuguese Rowing Federation's overall national ranking and also led the national rankings for youth rowing, pararowing and indoor rowing.

As of 2025, the club had won 528 medals in Portuguese national rowing competitions, including 200 gold medals, and had 172 rowers registered with the national federation. It has also been recognised for its role in the development of women's and adaptive rowing in Portugal.

== History ==
The club was founded in Valbom by a group of water-sports enthusiasts led by Manuel Santos Almeida Bessa, Américo Pinto Soares and Américo Pereira. Its original purpose was to promote water sports among local young people.

It was originally established as the Escola Naval Infante D. Henrique. The name Clube Naval Infante D. Henrique began to be adopted during the early 1930s.

In its early decades, the club was active in rowing, swimming and water polo. It later operated basketball, recreational fishing and table tennis sections, although rowing eventually became its principal sport.

The club experienced a period of limited activity between 1935 and 1950. Its rowing programme expanded during the 1960s and, during the following decade, it became established among Portugal's leading rowing clubs.

Infante was granted the status of an institution of public utility in 1981. During its centenary year in 2025, the Portuguese Government awarded the club the Medal of Honour for Sporting Merit for its contribution to rowing, adaptive rowing and youth development.

== Competitive record ==
Infante competes across youth, junior, senior, masters, indoor, coastal and pararowing categories. The club has regularly contributed rowers to Portuguese national teams and international competitions.

The club secured its 14th national club title in the 2024–25 season, when it also finished first in the Portuguese Rowing Federation's overall ranking.

In 2023, a rower developed by Infante won the men's lightweight double sculls event at the European Under-23 Rowing Championships.

In July 2026, Infante won the Portuguese senior men's coxed-eight championship. The victory returned the historic Taça Lisboa to the club for the first time in nine years.

== Women's rowing ==
Infante was one of the pioneers of organised women's rowing in Portugal. In late 1967, a women's crew was formed at the club at a time when female participation in Portuguese rowing was still uncommon.

In 1971, a women's coxed-four crew from the club won regional and national titles. Rowers from Infante later represented Portugal at a competition in Cognac, France.

== Adaptive rowing ==
According to the club's historical records, its involvement in adaptive rowing dates to at least 1994, when an agreement with the Areosa Rehabilitation Centre enabled people with disabilities to use its facilities regularly.

Adaptive rowing subsequently became part of the club's regular sporting activity. Infante placed first in the Portuguese national pararowing ranking in the 2024–25 season. The Portuguese Government also cited the club's work in adaptive rowing when awarding it the Medal of Honour for Sporting Merit in 2025.

== Facilities ==
The club is based at the Gramido Nautical Sports Centre, on the right bank of the Douro River. Its present boathouse was inaugurated in 2009 and includes boat storage, changing rooms, a gymnasium, an ergometer room and indoor rowing tanks.

The complex also includes a training centre with accommodation for up to 42 people. It receives Portuguese and international rowing teams for training camps on the Douro.

== Regattas ==
The club organises three recurring rowing events on the Douro River:

- the Regata 25 de Abril, held at Gramido and first organised in the 1970s; its 51st edition took place in 2026;
- the Regata Internacional de Gondomar, held at the Melres rowing course and attended by Portuguese and international crews; and
- the Aerobic Monsters – International Singles Regatta, a competition for single sculls.

The Regata Internacional de Gondomar reached its 44th edition during the club's centenary celebrations in 2025 and its 45th edition in May 2026.
