= Shanklin Sandown Rowing Club =

English Rowing club

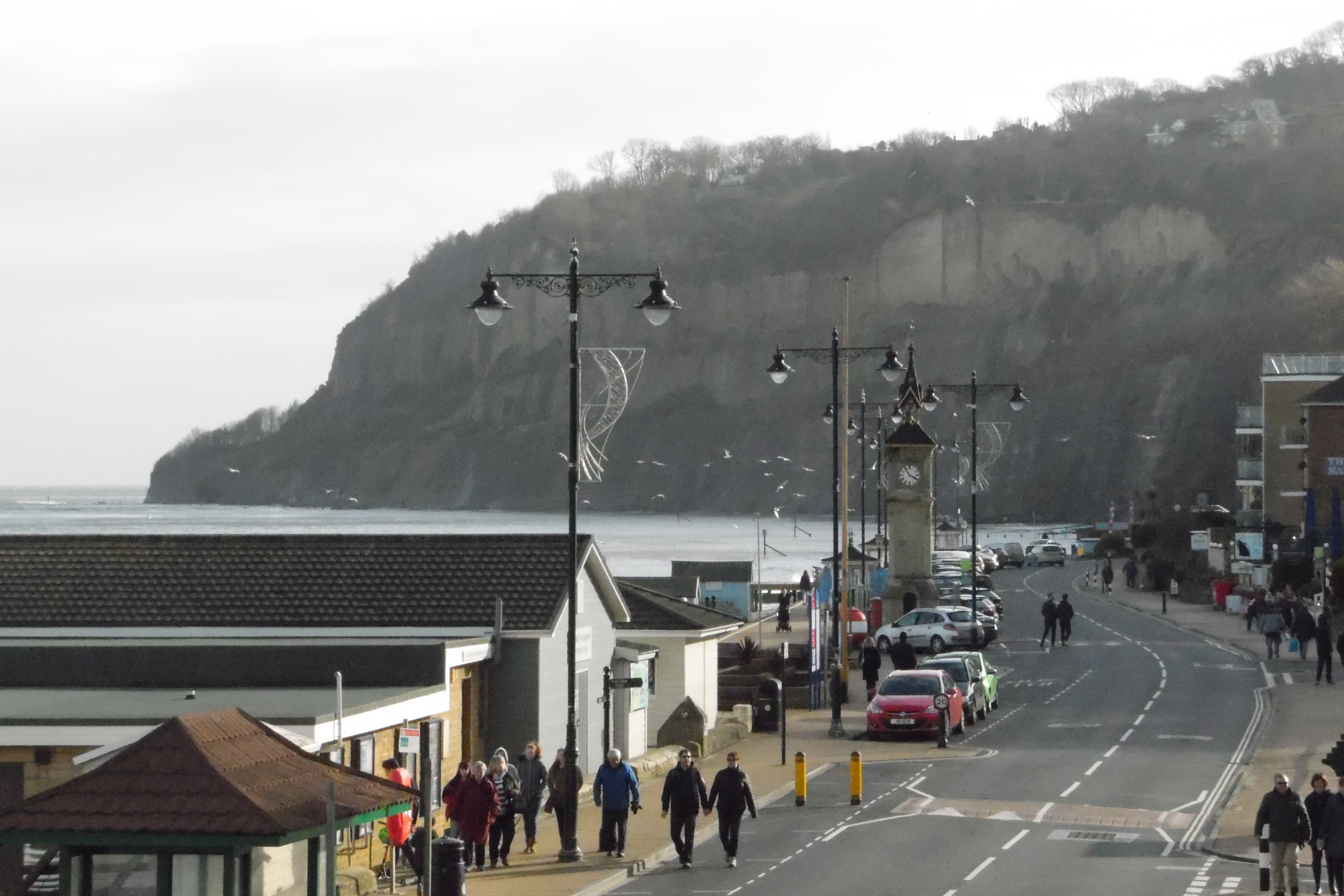

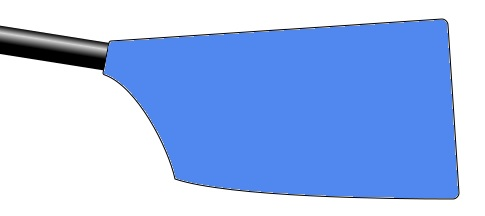
- The grey fronted boathouse on the left, with a gable roof in March 2020
- Location: Osborne Beach, Esplanade, Shanklin, Isle of Wight, England PO37 6BG
- Coordinates: 50.62967641385659°N 1.172069639459669°W
- Founded: 1875
- Affiliations: British Rowing boat code - SHS
- Website: www.shanklinsandownrowingclub.com

Events
- Shanklin Regatta (May)

Shanklin Sandown Rowing Club is a rowing club based in Shanklin, Isle of Wight.

== History ==
The club was founded in 1875 as the Shanklin Rowing Club near Shanklin Pier. Being located next to the sea the club was primarily a coastal rowing club and originally consisted of four oared galleys. The club was a member of the Coast Amateur Rowing Association and won The Borough of Portsmouth Grand Challenge Cup from 1888 through to 1890.

In 1903 the club was a founder member of the Hampshire & Dorset Amateur Rowing Association, along with six others but on 5 November 1916 the boathouse was destroyed by bad weather. A rowing club in Sandown also existed from c.1900 until World War II.

In December 1954 at a meeting at the Grange Hotel, the club reformed as a merger of Shanklin and Sandown. A new boathouse was built on Osborne Beach the following year and remained as the club's base until 1975, when the present stone clubhouse was constructed nearby. The club primarily competing in coastal events and hosted an annual Shanklin Sandown Regatta held off Shanklin Esplanade.

Club member Louis Attrill, won a gold medal at the 2000 Summer Olympics in Sydney.

In recent years (2022 and 2024) the club has produced several British champions.

== Honours ==
=== British champions ===
| Year | Winning crew/s |
|---|---|
| 2022 | Open J14 2x, Women J16 1x |
| 2024 | Open J16 1x, Open J16 2x |
