= Leeds Rowing Club =

British Rowing affiliated club

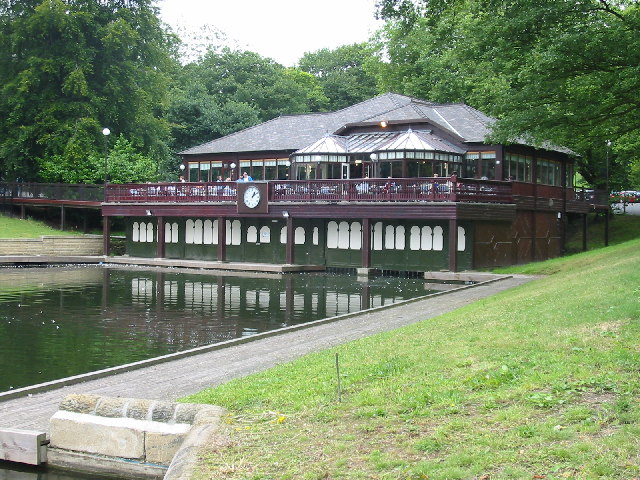

- Location: Thwaites Mill, Leeds, England
- Home water: River Aire
- Founded: 2006; 20 years ago
- Affiliations: British Rowing
- Website: www.leedsrowing.org.uk

Leeds Rowing Club is a British Rowing affiliated club in the city of Leeds, West Yorkshire, England. The club is based in two locations at Stourton by Thwaites Mill in the south of the city and Roundhay Park, to the north of the City centre. The club row in dark blue, with a vertical yellow stripe between two white stripes down both sides. Blades are dark blue with a lighter blue tip. The club races in all categories of boats and has a growing fleet of high performance boats and competes in regattas and head races across the UK, ranging from heads and regattas in the Yorkshire Region through to competing at the Tideway Heads as well as Henley Royal Regatta and the Henley Women's Regatta.

== History ==
For many years, Leeds’ representation in the rowing world only existed through the University Boat Club, who rowed in York. Despite suitable stretches of water being available in the city, rowing had not featured on the river or canal since the early eighties, when there was a boathouse at Swillington.

Up until 2006, there were no clubs rowing in Leeds. Leeds Schools Boat Club were no longer in operation, and Leeds University Boat Club rowed on the River Ouse in York.

The Leeds Rowing Club was founded in 2006, the same year that the first boathouse was built. It was the first open membership rowing club in the city. The Waterloo Lake boathouse is set on the 800 metres Waterloo Lake, in Roundhay Park, and served as the main boathouse until 2014. Since 2014, the club bases all of its learn to row courses and recreational rowing at Waterloo Lake.

In late 2014 the club, in conjunction with Leeds University, moved into a new club house built on the Leeds Canal. The club house provided the club with almost 4 km worth of water to train on, an improved gym and changing areas and a much larger boathouse, allowing both Leeds RC and Leeds University to increase the size of their fleets. The gym area in the club house, overlooking the canal included 12 rowing machines and aweights area.

Leeds Rowing Club made the semi–final of the club coxed four event at Henley Women's Regatta as well as racing four consecutive years in a row at Henley Royal Regatta, twice in the Wyfold Challenge Cup and twice in the Thames Challenge Cup.

In 2018, Leeds Rowing Club pre-qualified for the first time in the Thames Challenge Cup. The Masters Squad have competed and won at the British Rowing Masters Championships as well as racing at the FISA World Masters Regatta.
