= Exeter Rowing Club =

British rowing club

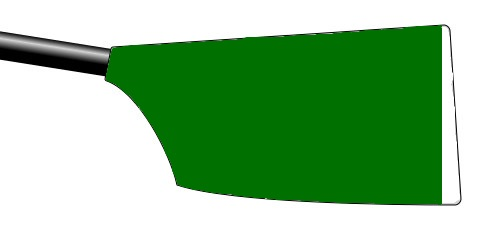
- Location: Exe Water Sports Association, 62 Haven Road, Exeter, Devon
- Coordinates: 50.716212°N 3.529617°W
- Founded: 1864
- Affiliations: British Rowing (boat code EXE)
- Website: exeterrowingclub.com

Exeter Rowing Club is a rowing club on the River Exe, based at Exe Water Sports Association, 62 Haven Road, Exeter, Devon.

== History ==
The club was formed in 1864 but has much earlier origins with its early connections to the Exeter Amateur Rowing Club, St Thomas Amateur Rowing Club and Port Royal Amateur Rowing Club. The following year the club took control of the City of Exeter Regatta, which is the major annual event in the area.

The club has members of all age groups and has had major national success in recent years, with the most recent being two national titles at the 2025 British Rowing Club Championships.

== Honours ==
=== National champions ===
Year	Winning crew/s
2015	Women J15 1x, Women J14 1x
2017	Women J15 1x
2018	Open J15 2x
2019	Open J16 2x
2021	Open J18 2x
2024	Open J15 2x
2025	Open J14 1x, Women J14 2x
