= Cambridge '99 Rowing Club =

British rowing club

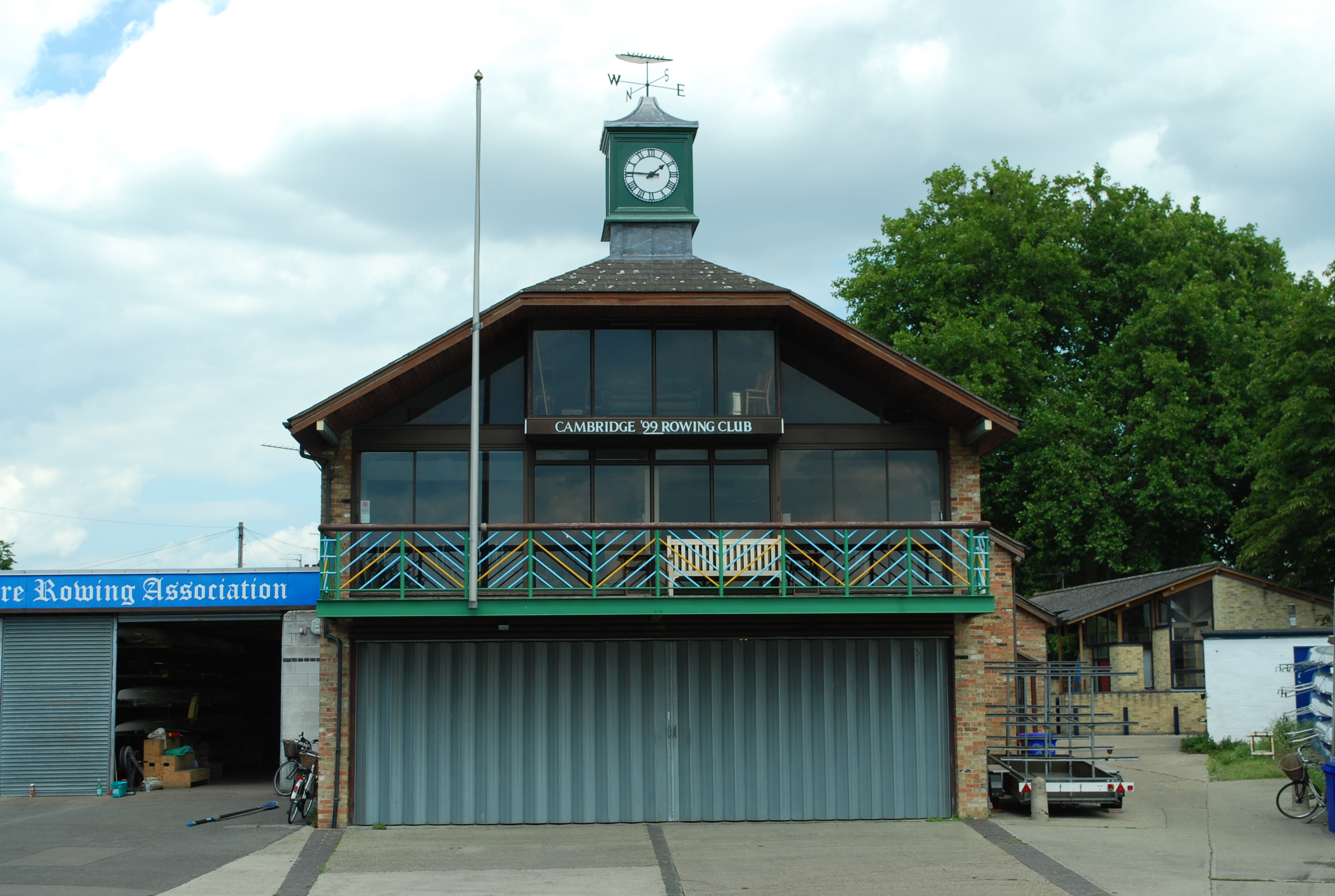

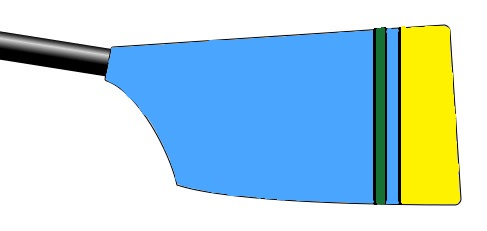
- Motto: Success is Labour's Reward
- Location: Cambridge, England
- Coordinates: 52°12′42.27″N 0°7′46.73″E
- Home water: River Cam
- Founded: 1899
- Key people: Bonk Conolly (President); Keith Garrett (Captain)
- Affiliations: British Rowing boat code - CNN; Cambridgeshire Rowing Association
- Website: www.cambridge99.org

Cambridge '99 Rowing Club, generally referred to as 'Nines', is based on Kimberley Road in the historic City of Cambridge, England. The blade colours are sky blue with dark green and "yellow" bands; kit: sky blue, old gold and dark green.

== History ==
Cambridge '99 Rowing Club was formed in 1899 and is the third oldest of the 'Town' clubs in Cambridge. The club was named in recognition of the Cambridge University Blue Boat which beat Oxford in The Boat Race in 1899 after a period of Oxford domination. The first president was Mr W. F. Taylor.

It was founded as a spin-off from the YMCA Boat Club after some members decided they wanted the freedom to smoke, drink and row on Sundays.

== The boathouse ==
Nines boathouse is one of the best-equipped in Cambridge, with large training areas for ergs and weights in addition to a considerable fleet of boats across all classes. There are also changing rooms, showers, fully equipped kitchen and well-stocked bar for social activities.

The current three-storey boathouse was built to the design of a Swiss chalet, the previous boathouse on the site having been destroyed in an arson attack in August 1983.

== Members ==
Nines welcomes all levels of rower from the complete novice to those with national experience. The club has men's, women's and junior squads and has a strong record of developing rowers, with a number of members having competed at GB level and within the Cambridge University Blue squad for The Boat Race.

== Club events ==
Nines organise two regattas each year. The Spring Regatta is an Eights event and is raced to a large extent by local Cambridge University College crews preparing for May Bumps in addition to the local Town Clubs.

The Autumn Regatta is a much larger event, attracting Clubs from throughout the UK, and is the only Regatta in Cambridge run under the auspices of British Rowing.

The Club organise many social events throughout the year as a key part of rowing life in Cambridge and members are regularly involved in fundraising for a range of charities.

== Rowing events and achievements ==
The biggest race in the local calendar is the Cambridgeshire Rowing Association Bumps in which all club members participate. The men's First boat currently hold the Headship position, while the women's First boat currently hold sixth place. In 2019, a Club record 17 crews were entered for Bumps (9 Women's Eights and 8 Men's Eights) and in addition to Men's Headship, were awarded the John Jenner trophy for most successful Club and the Stephen Allen Bowl for best-performing Juniors. The 2020 Bumping races were cancelled due to the Covid pandemic.

In the 1990 CRA Bumping Races, the club was the first to hold the 'Head of the River' position simultaneously in both the Men's and Women's events, and in 2006 became the first Club to hold both first and second places on the river simultaneously in the Women's event.

On the Thames, 1993 saw the Men's squad win the Jackson Trophy at the Head of the River Race (HoRR), finishing in 13th position overall.

Nines compete at all the local Cambridge events and also travel extensively throughout the UK (and overseas) to challenge at major events. In 2019, several Nines crews competed in the Head of the Charles Race in the US, while a Men's 4+ travelled to Belgium to compete in the Ghent International Regatta, winning a silver medal.

Henley Royal Regatta is a key event for the club, with crews entered most years, in addition to the Henley Women's event. Most-recently, two Men's crews qualified and competed in the Wyfold Challenge Cup in 2019.

== Honours ==
=== British champions ===
Year	Winning crew/s
1988	Men J14 2x
1993	Men 2-
1994	Men 2-
2007	Open J16 1x
