= Chester-le-Street Amateur Rowing Club =

British rowing club

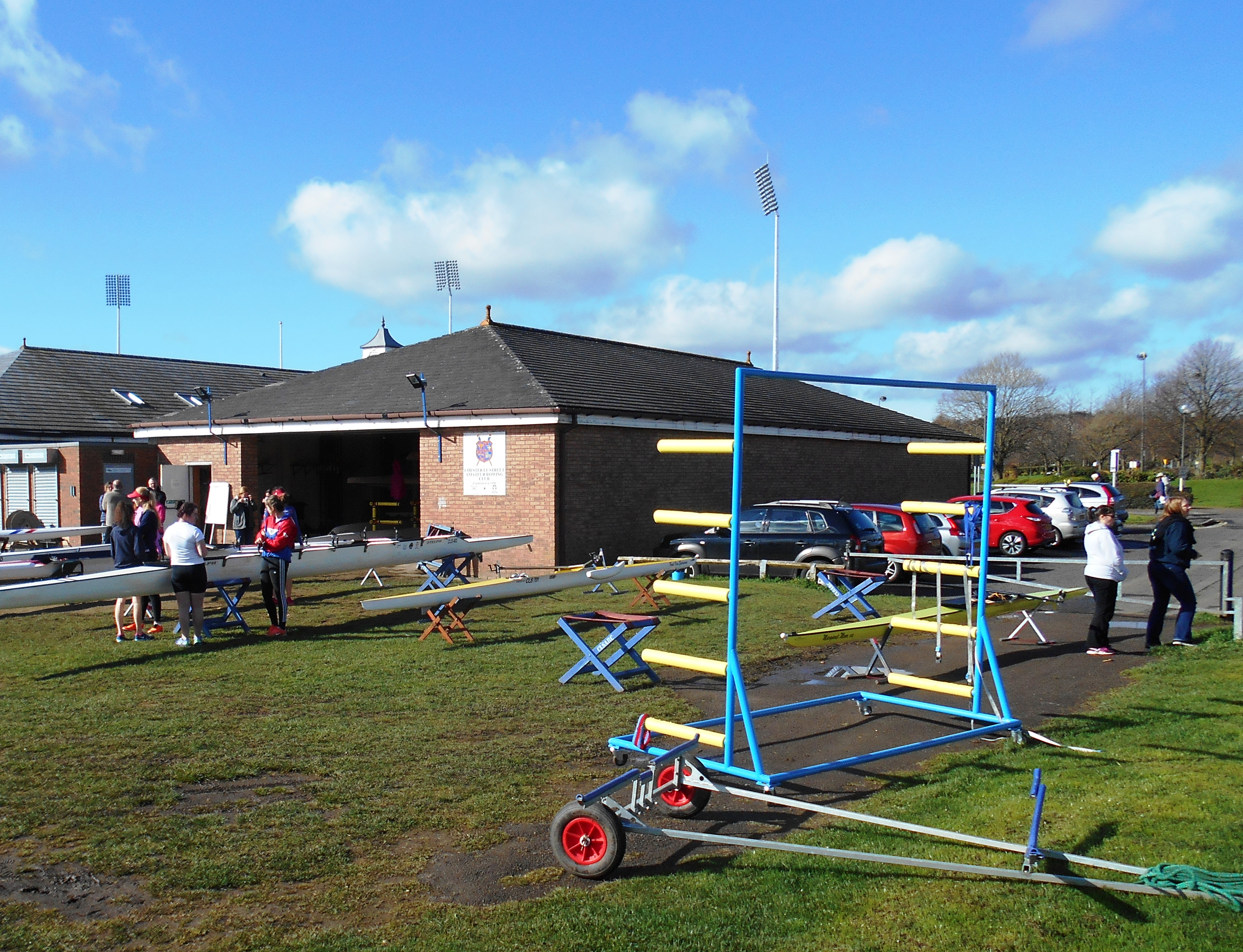

- Location: Riverside Sports Complex, Chester-le-Street, County Durham, England
- Coordinates: 54.851185°N 1.559873°W
- Founded: 1888
- Affiliations: British Rowing (boat code CLS)
- Website: clsarc.org

Chester-le-Street Amateur Rowing Club is a rowing club on the River Wear, based at the Riverside Sports Complex, Chester-le-Street, County Durham. The blade colours are red, royal blue and a white diagonal stripe; kit: red & royal blue.

== History ==
The club was founded as Chester-le-Street Rowing Club in 1888, initially rowing from a boathouse in a park that burnt down during the 1930s.

After a dormant period the club was started again by Bob Heywood during the 1980s and by 2001 had increased members to the point where more boats were needed. The club recorded 63 wins during 2001.

In recent years the club has produced several national champions, with the most recent being at the 2025 British Rowing Club Championships.

== Notable members ==
- Victoria Bryant
- Lauren Irwin

== Honours ==
=== National champions ===
Year	Winning crew/s
2014	Women J14 1x
2015	Open J14 1x
2018	Open J16 4+
2025	Women J14 1x

== See also ==
- List of rowing clubs on the River Wear
