= University of Leeds Boat Club =

British rowing club

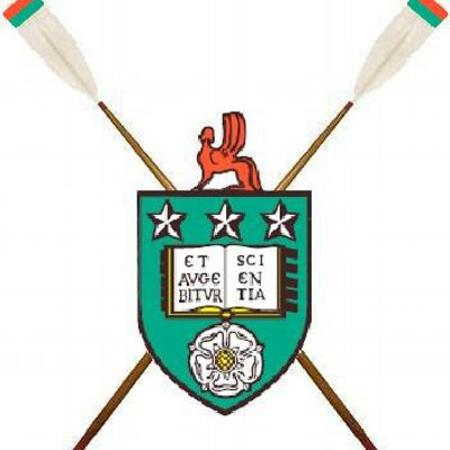

- Location: Leeds, West Yorkshire, England
- Home water: River Aire
- Founded: 1919
- Former names: Leeds University Union Boat Club
- University: University of Leeds
- Affiliations: British Rowing

The University of Leeds Boat Club (UOLBC) is the rowing club for students at the University of Leeds, West Yorkshire, England. The club races in green, burgundy and white colours representing those of the University of Leeds and is affiliated to British Rowing. The club owns and maintains a variety of different rowing and sculling boats of different classes.

== History ==
The club was founded in 1912 as the Leeds University Union Boat Club and had adopted its current title by 1919. Members were able to initially use the facilities of the Bradford Amateur Rowing Club.

During the 1920s and early 1930s the boathouse was located at Rodley on the bank of the Leeds and Liverpool Canal. Another boathouse which was built in 1921 in the village of Calverley was used by the students.

In 1937 the club moved to a new boathouse at Swillington, Woodlesford on the Aire.

Having occupied a variety of buildings throughout the area, the current water base is located in Leeds following the completion of a new boat house which opened in September 2014 next to Thwaite Mills in Stourton. Land training takes place in Leeds University's sport complex on the main campus in Leeds.

== Racing ==
The club competes at local and national events and has had a number of notable achievements from competing at BUCS, Head of The River and Henley Royal Regatta – reaching the second round of the Temple Challenge Cup in 2004 and 2007.

=== Results ===
BUCS Regatta 2019:

- Silver, Men's Championship 1x, Leeds (Brigham)
- Silver, Women's Beginner 4x, Leeds

Head of the River Race 2019:

- 56th place, Leeds University 'A'
- 179th place, Leeds University 'B'
- 176th place, Leeds University 'C'

Women's Eights Head of the River Race 2018:

- 85th place, Leeds University 'A'
- 218th place, Leeds University 'C'
- 221st place, Leeds University 'B'

Head of the River Race 2018:

- 81st place, Leeds University 'A'
- 256th place, Leeds University 'B'

Women's Eights Head of the River Race 2017:

- 130th place, Leeds University 'A'
- 267th place, Leeds University 'B'

Women's Eights Head of the River Race 2016:

- 89th place, Leeds University 'A'
- 273rd place, Leeds University 'B'

Head of the River Race 2016:

- 203rd place, Leeds University I
- 299th place, Leeds University II

Head of the River Race 2015:

- 140th place, Leeds University I
- 306th place, Leeds University II

Women's Eights Head of the River Race 2013:

- 145th place, Leeds University

Head of the River Race 2012:

- 114th place, Leeds University I, 00:19:24.90
- 181st place, Leeds University II, 00:19:51.88

Women's Eights Head of the River Race 2012:

- 110th place, Leeds University A, 00:22:42.57
- 271st place, Leeds University B, 00:25:38.58

BUCS Regatta 2012:

- 0 gold, 0 silver, 1 bronze
- 36 VL points

British and European Indoor Rowing Championship

- 1st – Women's Lwt – Emily Holt, 7:29.8

== See also ==
- University rowing (UK)
