= Rob Roy Boat Club =

British rowing club

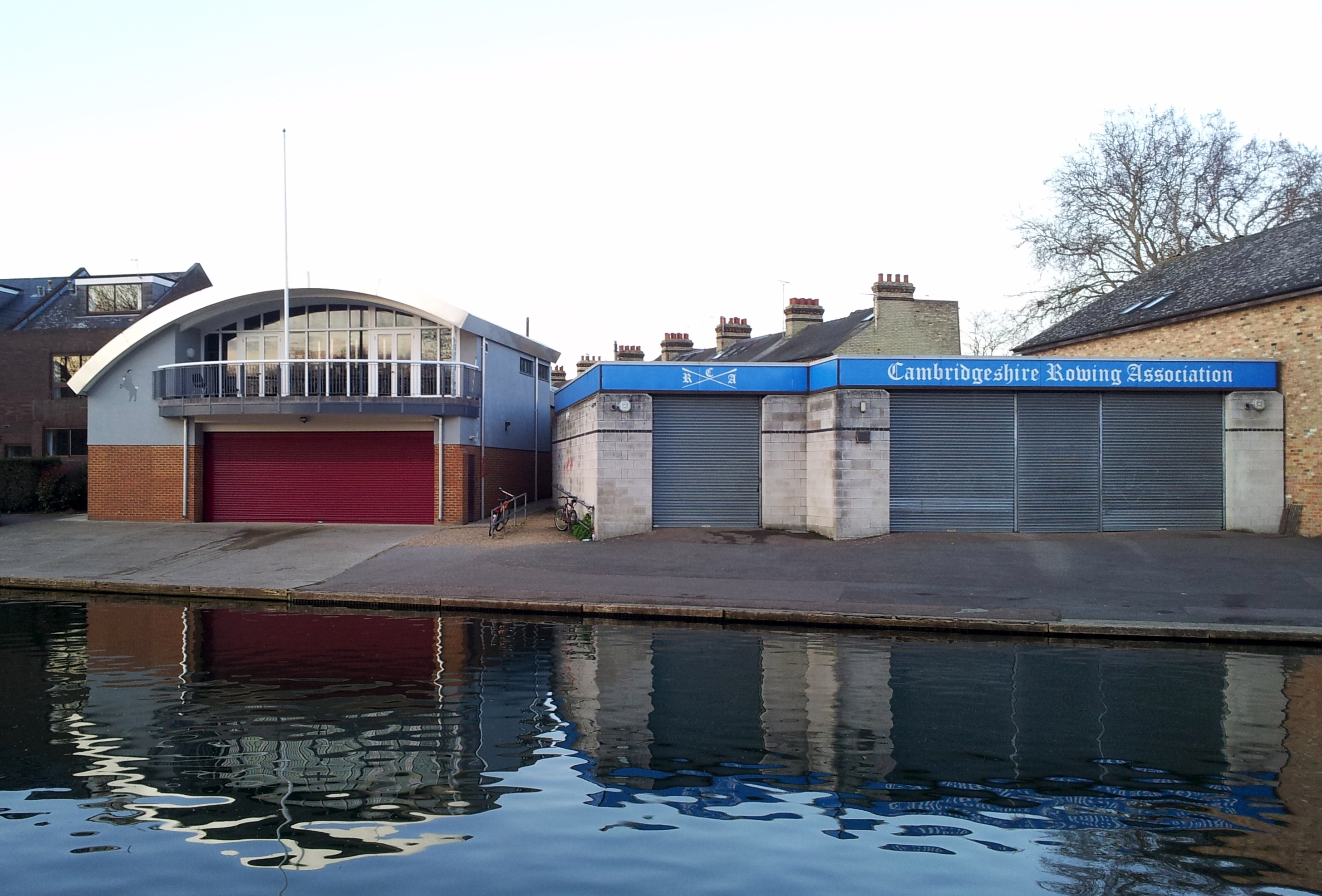

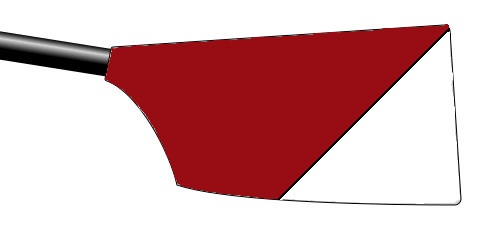
- Location: Cambridge, England
- Home water: River Cam
- Founded: 1880
- Affiliations: British Rowing boat code - ROB; Cambridgeshire Rowing Association
- Website: www.robroyboatclub.net

Events
- Cambridge Small Boats Head; Cambridge Autumn Head

Distinctions
- Cambridge Town Bumps Men's Headship (1998-2006)

Rob Roy Boat Club, or Robs, is a boat club based on the River Cam in Cambridge, England, which has traditionally focused on training and racing in small boats. The club has members at all levels, from national squad through seniors and veterans to juniors and novices.

The club colours, blades and kit are Royal Irish Maroon and white and the club is a member of the Cambridgeshire Rowing Association and shares the boathouse with them.

== Racing ==
Club members compete at head races and regattas ranging from local events on the River Cam, through to the major national events such as Henley Royal Regatta and the National Rowing Championships, to the World Cup Regattas and World Championships.

The club also competes in the Cambridge Town Bumps, which provides an enjoyable end to the summer regatta season. The first men's crew held the Headship from 1998 to 2006.

== Events ==
Rob Roy organises the Cambridge Small Boats Head which is held in early October each year (for coxed and coxless pairs, and single and double sculls), and the Cambridge Autumn Head which is held in mid October each year (for coxed and coxless fours and quads, and eights).

== History ==
The club was founded in 1880. On 5 June 1880 an item appeared in the Cambridge Chronicle as follows:

"A new boat club has been started by the Church Temperance Society of Cambridge and Chesterton under the name of 'Rob Roy' and it will be open to members of the various branches.

The following officers have been elected for the present season: The Rev. J. Martin, president; Captain P. Going, vice president; the Rev. G.H. Ling (Corpus), treasurer: Mr Percy Talbot, secretary; Mr C.V. Key, first captain; Mr J.W. Chandler, second captain; and the Rev. A.E. Meredith, Messrs. R. Meddings, W. Stearn, E. Tredgett, H. Gautrey, J.R. Newman and S. Clayton, committee.

Strict temperance is to be enforced to liquors and language. Pair-oared and four-oared races have been arranged and an eight is to be entered for the Town Races."

== Honours ==
=== British champions ===
Year	Winning crew/s
1977	Men J16 1x
1978	Men J18 4x
1984	Women J18 2x
1989	Men L4x
1991	Women L2x
1992	Men 2+, Women 1x, Women L1x
1995	Men 1x, Men L1x
1996	Men 1x, Women J18 2x
1997	Men J18 2x
1998	Men 4x
2003	Women L1x
2006	Women J18 1x, Women J16 1x
2007	Women J18 1x
2008	Women J18 8+
2018	Open J16 1x
2019	Open J18 1x, Women J16 4x
2025	Women J18 2x
