= Danesfield Challenge Cup =

Rowing event for women's quadruple sculls

- Venue: Henley Royal Regatta, River Thames
- Location: Henley-on-Thames, Oxfordshire
- Dates: 2026 – present

The Danesfield Challenge Cup is a rowing event for women's quadruple sculls at the annual Henley Royal Regatta on the River Thames at Henley-on-Thames in England. It is open to female crews from all eligible clubs (not university, college or school) and rowers who are not former or current internationals, and has similar qualifying rules to the Wargrave Challenge Cup.

== History ==
The introduction of three new events for women's quadruple sculls, in the Intermediate, Club and Student categories, was announced by the Stewards of Henley Royal Regatta on 9 December 2025.

On 26 March 2026 the names of these new events were announced as the Princess of Wales Challenge Trophy, the Danesfield Challenge Cup and the Queen Victoria Challenge Cup.

== Winners ==
Year	Winner	Runner Up	Ref
2026	Molesey Boat Club	Leander Club	
