= Henley Prize =

The Henley Prize is a title which has been used at the annual Henley Royal Regatta on the River Thames at Henley-on-Thames in England as a prize for new events which do not yet have their own trophies.

In 1968, it was used for an event for men's coxed fours. The following year this event was renamed the Britannia Challenge Cup following the donation of a trophy by Nottingham Britannia Rowing Club.

In 1990 and 1991, it was used for an event for student men's eights. The following year this event was renamed the Temple Challenge Cup.

In 2000 and 2001, it was used for an event for women's eights. The following year this event was renamed the Remenham Challenge Cup following the donation of a trophy by Remenham Club.
