= Henley Royal Regatta =

Recurring rowing event in Henley-on-Thames, England

Coordinates: 51°32′55″N 0°53′39″W

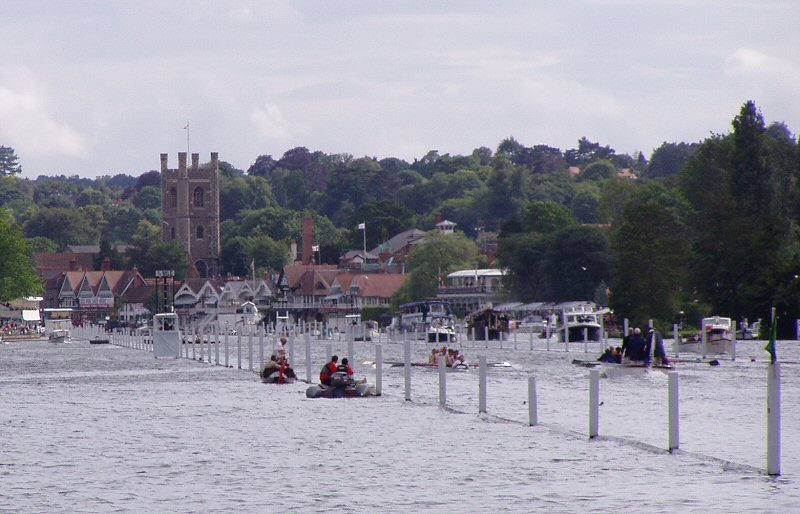
- A race taking place at the 2004 regatta
- Frequency: Annual
- Locations: Henley-on-Thames, England
- Organizer: The stewards of Henley Royal Regatta
- Website: hrr.co.uk

Henley Royal Regatta (or Henley Regatta, its original name pre-dating Royal patronage) is a British rowing event held annually on the River Thames by the Oxfordshire town of Henley-on-Thames. It was established on 26 March 1839. It differs from the three other regattas rowed over approximately the same course, Henley Women's Regatta, Henley Masters Regatta, and Henley Town and Visitors' Regatta, each of which is an entirely separate event.

The regatta lasts for six days (Tuesday to Sunday) ending on the first weekend in July. Events are head-to-head knock out competitions, raced upstream over a course of 1 mile and 550yds, or 2,112m. The regatta regularly attracts international crews to race. The most prestigious event at the regatta is the Grand Challenge Cup for men's Eights, which has been awarded since the regatta was first staged.

As the regatta pre-dates any national or international rowing organization, it has its own rules and organization, although it is recognized by both British Rowing (the governing body of rowing in England and Wales) and World Rowing. The regatta is organised by a self-perpetuating body of Stewards, who are largely former rowers themselves. One exception to this rule is that the Mayor of Henley-on Thames Council is an ex-officio Steward. Pierre de Coubertin modelled elements of the organisation of the International Olympic Committee on the Henley Stewards.

Despite its name, remarkably little of the Henley Royal Regatta actually takes place in Henley-on-Thames, or even Oxfordshire. The race's start and finish points, the regatta headquarters and most of the viewing enclosures are located within Remenham, a Berkshire village that flanks the entirety of the right bank of the river throughout the regatta course. Only a small section of the left bank, nearest the finish line, is in Oxfordshire, with the bulk being in Buckinghamshire. Traditionally the two banks are known as the Berkshire and Buckinghamshire banks.

The regatta is regarded as part of the British social season. As with other events in the season, certain enclosures at the regatta have strict dress codes.

== Format of competition ==
=== Qualifying ===
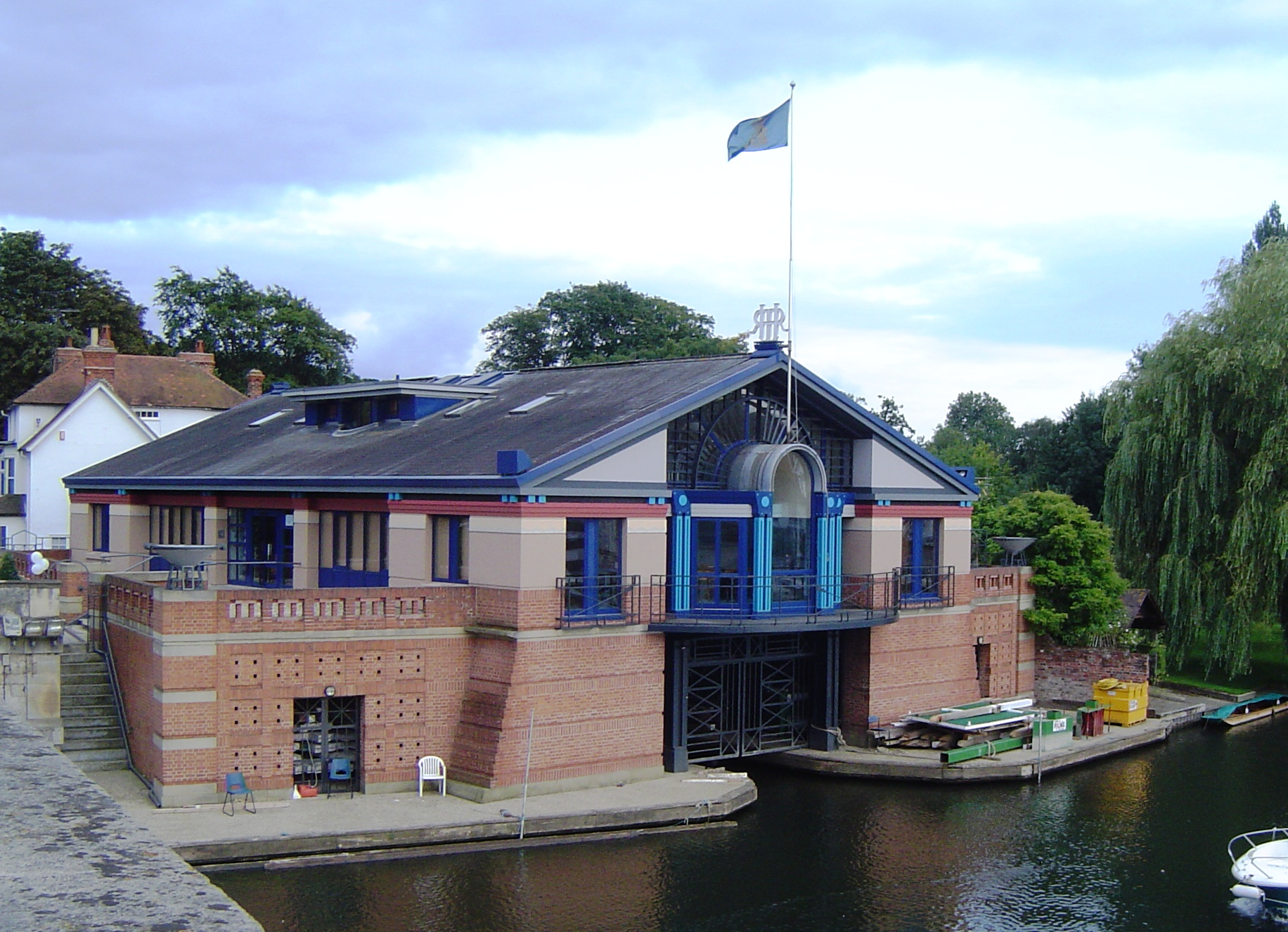
Henley Royal Regatta Headquarters by the Remenham end of Henley Bridge

Entries for the regatta close at 6 pm sixteen days before the Regatta. In order to encourage a high quality of racing, create a manageable race timetable and to ensure that most crews race only once a day, each event has a limited number of places. Qualifying races are held on the Friday before the regatta. The regatta's Committee of Management decides at its absolute discretion which crews are obliged to qualify; the Committee will examine the form and calibre of the entrants and may choose to pre-qualify some of them.

The qualifying races take the form of a timed processional race up the regatta course, with the fastest crews qualifying. Times are released for non-qualifying crews only. This does not stop an enthusiastic band of unofficial timers with synchronised watches working out how fast their first round opposition might be.

If it is apparent that there are a number of outstanding crews in an event, they may be 'selected' by the Stewards, to prevent them from meeting too early in the competition. The regatta insists that selection is not the same as seeding, the main difference being that there is no 'rank order' as is usually the case in, for example, a tennis tournament.

=== The Draw ===
The Draw is a public event that takes place in the Henley Town Hall, normally at 3 pm on the Saturday before the regatta. For each event the names of all selected crews are placed on pieces of paper which are then drawn at random from the Grand Challenge Cup. These crews are then placed on pre-determined positions on the draw chart, as far apart as possible. The remaining qualifying crews are then drawn from the cup, filling in from the top of the draw chart downwards, until all places have been filled.

=== Racing ===
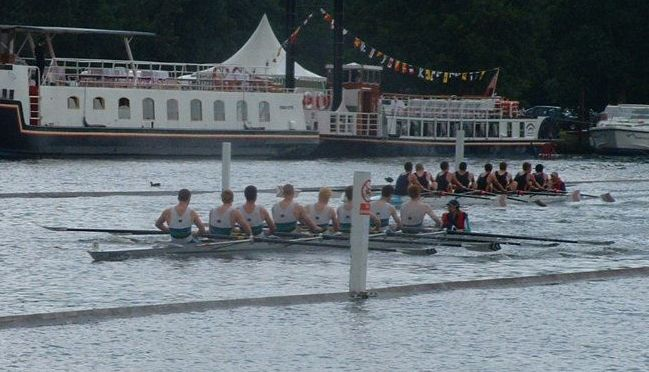
Two crews racing in the Temple Challenge Cup at Henley in 2003

Each event in the regatta takes the form of a knockout competition, with each race consisting of two crews racing side by side up the Henley course. The course is marked out by two lines of booms (wooden bars which float on the water, secured between vertical poles), which are placed along the river to form a straight course 2,112 meters long. The course is wide enough to allow two crews to race down with a few metres between them. As such it is not uncommon for inexperienced steersmen or coxswains to crash into the booms, possibly costing their crew the race, as happened with the University of Washington, in the final of the 2024 Grand Challenge Cup.

The race begins at the downstream end of Temple Island, where the crews attach to a pair of pontoons. The race umpire will then call out the names of the two crews and start them when they are both straight and ready. Each crew is assigned to row on either the 'Bucks' (Buckinghamshire) or 'Berks' (Berkshire) side of the race course. The coxswains or steersmen are expected to keep their crew on the allocated side of the course at all times during the race, else they risk disqualification. The only exception is when a crew leads by a sizeable margin and is not deemed by the umpire to be impeding the trailing crew.

There are several progress markers along the course. Intermediate times are recorded at two of them – "the Barrier" and "Fawley", in addition to the time to the finish. The regatta has official commentary, which is announced at these points along the course. The commentary is renowned for being unemotional and factual, with the commentator only allowed to announce the rate of striking, which crew is leading, the distance between the crews, and the progress marker which the crews are passing.

=== The course ===
Henley Royal Regatta has always been raced over a distance of 'about one mile and 550 yards' from Temple Island upstream towards Henley Bridge. However, four distinct courses have been used over the regatta's history, with smaller changes also being made incrementally. Changes to the course have all been aimed at improving the prospects for fair and safe racing.

==== The Old Course (1839–1885) ====
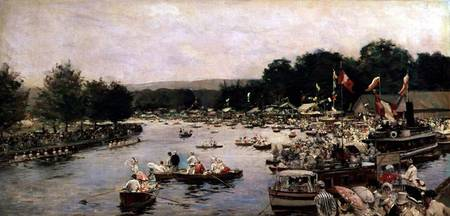
An 1877 painting by James Tissot showing the Old Course

This ran from a point just upstream of Temple Island. At the first regatta in 1839, the finish line was Henley Bridge itself, but it was presumably quickly realised that this had inherent problems. From 1840 onward the finish was moved downstream slightly; eventually a point opposite the lawn of the Red Lion Hotel became the standard finish line. A grandstand was erected for the Stewards and their guests outside the Red Lion. Other spectators could watch from the adjacent roadway (in front of the Little White Hart Hotel) while those with carriages surveyed the scene from a vantage point on Henley Bridge. There were three racing stations (Berkshire, Centre and Buckinghamshire). When only two crews raced, the Centre Station was not used.

The Old Course had a large lefthand bend in the last quarter-mile. This benefited the crew on the Berkshire side of the course not only because they raced a shorter distance but also because they avoided the worst of the river's current. Between 1866 and 1885, 57.7% all races were won by the crew on the Berkshire station, with the Buckinghamshire and Centre crews sharing 42.3%. The course was not boomed or piled, although between 1871 and 1873, poles were roped across the bay on the Berkshire side upstream of Poplar Point, in an attempt to minimise the advantage given to the crew on the Berkshire station.

==== The New Course (1886–1922) ====
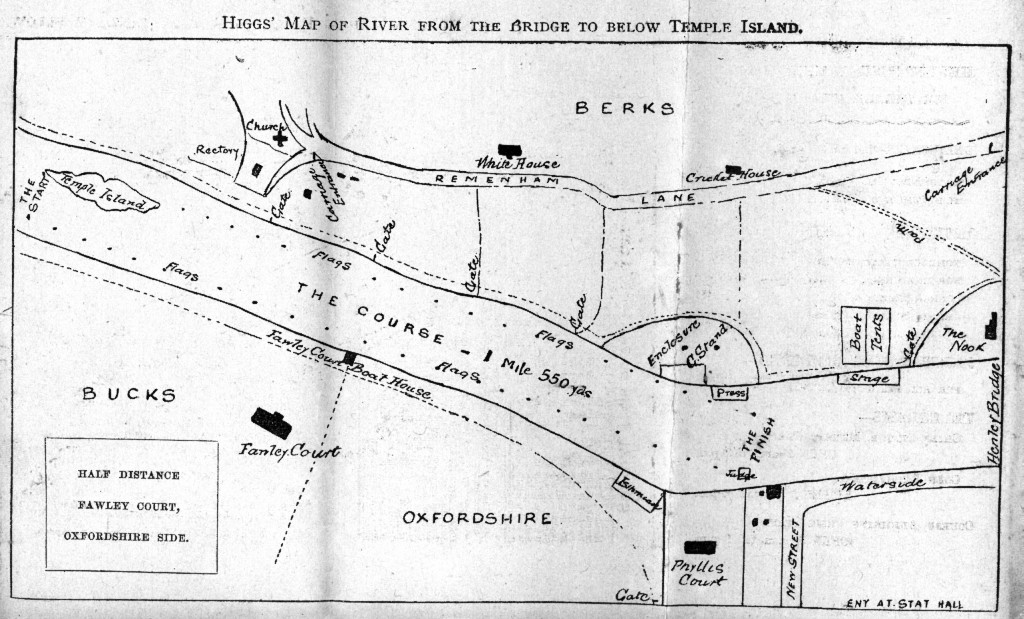
Map of the New Course from the 1893 programme

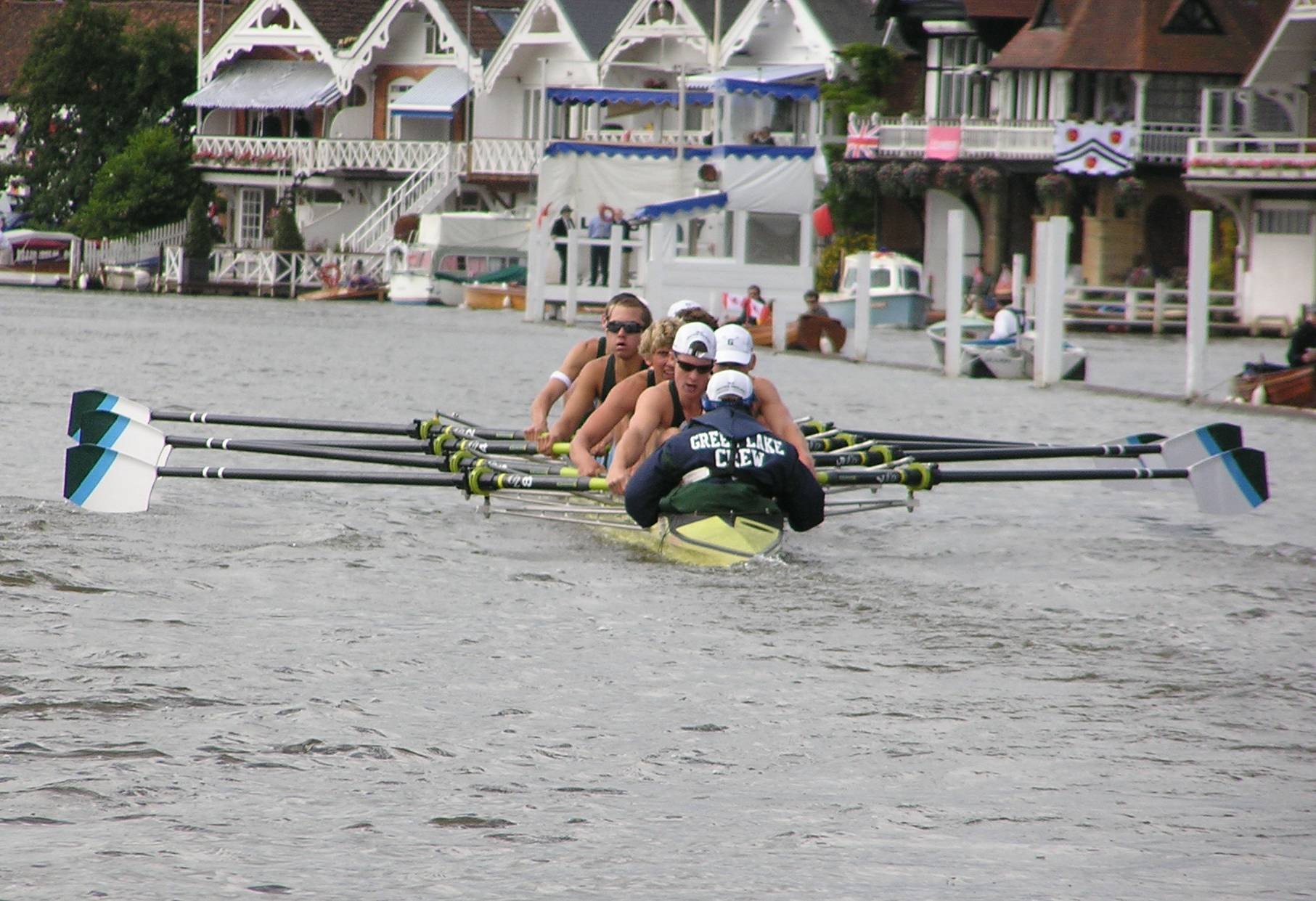
Green Lake Crew, USA racing, with the pilings and floating booms seen in the background

In 1884, a sub-committee of the regatta's Committee of Management discussed options for reducing the unfairness of the course. Their recommendation was to move the finish line downstream to Poplar Point (thus avoiding the bend) and the start to the bottom of Temple Island. This was not popular with spectators as it made previous viewing points obsolete. The sub-committee also recommending reducing the racing lanes from three to two and extending racing from two days to three. The Committee gained support from the Captains of competing Clubs and the changes were introduced for the 1886 Regatta.

The New Course started just downstream of Temple Island, on the Buckinghamshire side and finished opposite the upstream end of Phyllis Court, very close to the current finish line. There were two slight bends (at Remenham and just after Fawley) and a staggered start to compensate for them. The course was also piled for the first time, although not boomed. Unfortunately, it became apparent that in trying to eliminate the unfairness of the Old Course, a new problem had been introduced. Downstream of Fawley, bushes grew alongside the Buckinghamshire bank and provided shelter from the prevailing wind. The course now ran close to this bank and crew on the Buckinghamshire station gained the advantage of shelter whenever a 'Bushes Wind' was blowing. From 1886 to 1905, Bucks took 59% of wins against 41% on Berks.

To attempt to reduce the effect of the Bushes Wind, the course was narrowed and pushed further to the centre of the river. The width was 135 feet in 1887, in 120 feet in 1888 and then progressively until by 1914 it was down to 100 feet at the start tapering to 80 feet at the finish. In 1899, floating booms secured between the pilings which mark the course were also introduced along part of its length in an attempt to keep spectators from obstructing races.

==== The Experimental Course (1923) and the Straight Course (1924 onwards) ====
In around 1920, the Stewards carried out a survey canvassing the idea of a moving the start of the course to the Berkshire side of Temple Island. At the time this channel was a winding, shallow backwater and it would clearly not be possible to lay a course of the full Henley distance without significant alteration to the bank, the island and the riverbed.

For the 1923 regatta, the Stewards therefore decided to try a shorter experimental straight course which started at the top of the island. This produced 53.2% wins on Bucks and 46.8% on Berks, deemed enough of an improvement on the New Course to justify a permanent change. The consent of the landowners of the Berkshire bank and Temple island (Lord Hambleden and W.D. Mackenzie respectively) was obtained to widen and deepen the Berkshire channel; 10,000 cubic yards (7,600 m^{3}) of material were excavated. The Straight Course was now ready for use.

The Straight Course runs from the upstream end of Temple Island to a point opposite the upstream end of the Phyllis Court. It is 80 feet (24 m) wide. The Straight Course has generally addressed the problems of unfairness: for example, between 1975 and 1984, 50.52% of races were won on Bucks and 49.31% on Berks (with the remainder dead heats). However, when a strong stream is flowing, the Berks station enjoys considerable shelter from the stream, particularly in the last ¼ mile. Conversely, when there is a strong south-westerly wind it is better to be on the Bucks station because it is more sheltered from the wind. The course is now piled and boomed along its entire length, except for crossing points. The booms can present a hazard for the inexperienced coxswain or steersman.

==== Precise length of the course ====
When the start and finish positions of the Old Course had become established, the distance between them was found to be 1 mile 570 yds (2,131 metres). However, boats were aligned by their sterns at the start and judged by their bows at the finish. This meant that the course was slightly longer for shorter boats (such as single sculls) than for longer boats (such as eights). The length of an eight was assumed to be twenty yards and as such the course came to be described as "about 1 mile and 550 yards (2,112 metres)", which was the distance covered by an eight.

In 1967 the start of the Straight Course was relocated exactly 1 mile 550 yd from the finish. In the same year, moving pontoons were introduced at the start which allowed all boats, from singles to eights, to be aligned with their bows precisely on the start line. Since then all crews have raced a course of exactly one mile and 550 yards (2,112 metres).

=== Safety ===
During the whole regatta, during racing hours there are numerous safety boats provided by the Colwick Park Lifeguards to keep competitors safe. The regatta organisers arrange for a first aid provider to be present, who have an on site hospital-style area.

== History ==
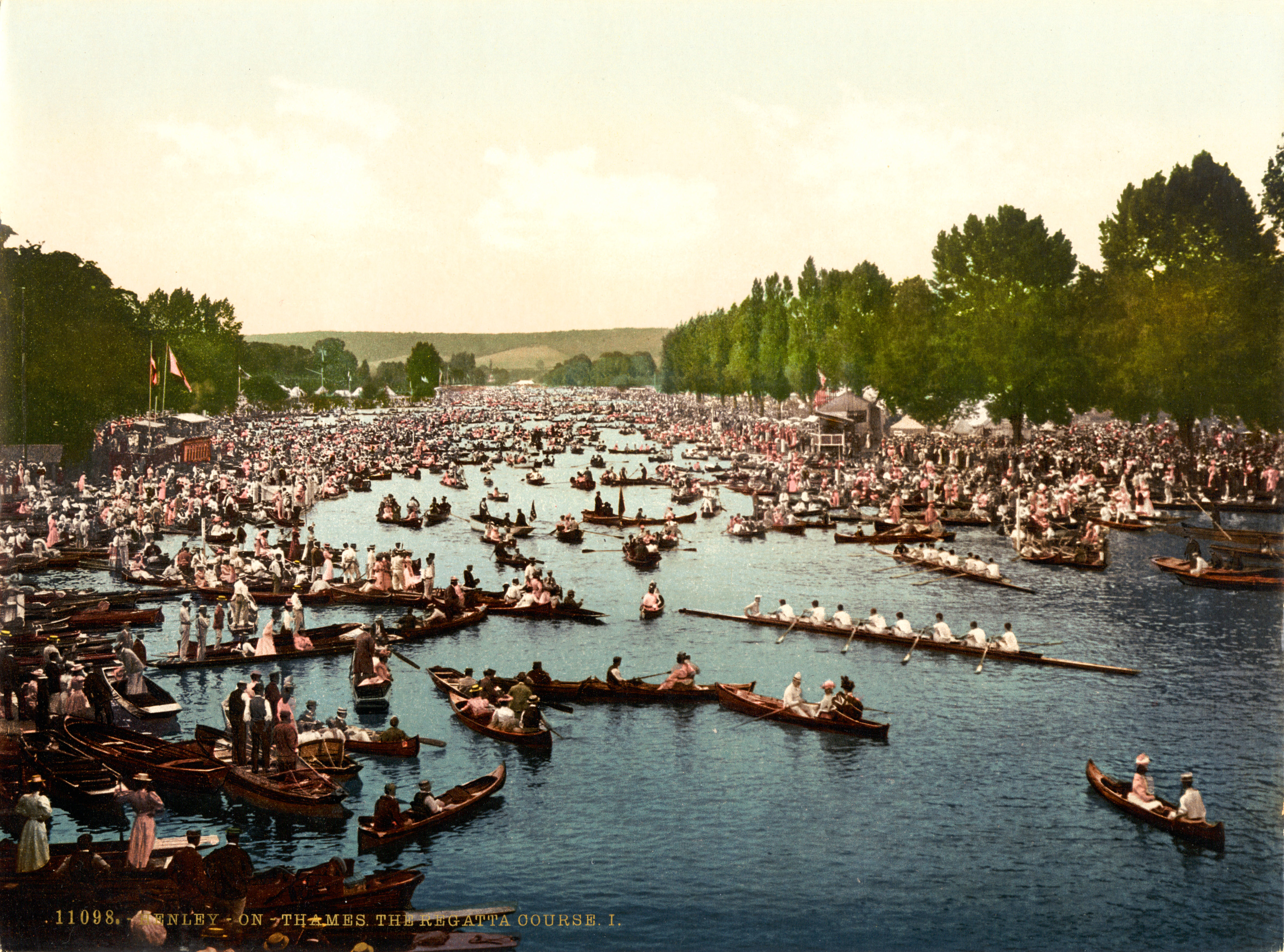
Regatta participants in the 1890s

At a public meeting in Henley town hall on 26 March 1839, Captain Edmund Gardiner proposed "that from the lively interest which had been manifested at the various boat races which have taken place on the Henley reach during the last few years, and the great influx of visitors on such occasions, this meeting is of the opinion that the establishing of an annual regatta, under judicious and respectable management, would not only be productive of the most beneficial results to the town of Henley, but from its peculiar attractions would also be a source of amusement and gratification to the neighbourhood, and the public in general."

The regatta was first staged in 1839, and proved so successful that it was expanded the next year from one day to two. As the regatta's popularity has grown it has further expanded: to three days in 1886, four days in 1906 and five days in 1986. The regatta has been known as Henley Royal Regatta since 1851, when Prince Albert became the first royal patron. Since his death, every reigning monarch has agreed to be the patron.

=== Amateurism and controversial exclusions ===
At the regatta's inception it was intended for amateur oarsmen rather than those who rowed professionally. In 1879 Henley produced its first formal definition of an amateur:

No person shall be considered an amateur oarsman or sculler, or coxswain:

1. Who has ever competed in any open competition for a stake, money, or entrance fee. (Not to apply to foreign crews.)
2. Who has ever competed with or against a professional for any prize.
3. Who has ever taught, pursued or assisted in the practice of athletic exercises of any kind as a means of gaining a livelihood.
4. Who has been employed in or about boats for money or wages.
5. Who is or has been by trade or employment for wages a mechanic, artisan or labourer.

— Henley Royal Regatta, 1879

In 1884, amateur status for overseas oarsmen was put on the same basis as for home oarsmen, thus ending the concession on racing for money prizes. By 1886 a phrase had also been added debarring any person "engaged in any menial activity".

These rules would become the cause of growing controversy as international entries to Henley increased; most foreign countries having a different definition of amateur. The adoption of Henley's definition of amateur by the Amateur Rowing Association of Great Britain would also cause a 66-year schism in British rowing, when in 1890 a rival National Amateur Rowing Association was set up, with a less restrictive definition of amateurism under which persons who worked in manual labour as their occupation could still be considered amateur rowers.

One well-known incident was the exclusion of future Olympic champion John B. Kelly Sr., who had served an apprenticeship as a bricklayer, from the 1920 regatta. According to the minutes of the regatta's Committee of Management, Kelly was excluded both because he was not eligible under the manual labour rules and because he was a member of Vesper Boat Club, which was banned in 1906 because members of its 1905 Henley crew had raised money to pay for their trip through public donations – making them professionals in the eyes of the Henley Stewards.

Kelly's exclusion was widely reported in newspapers in both the UK and USA, with many seeing it as an attempt to prevent an American from winning the Diamonds. Kelly's son John B. Kelly Jr. would dramatically win the 1947 Diamond Sculls, and his daughter would become the famous Academy Award-winning actress and Princess of Monaco Grace Kelly, keeping the incident in the public eye for decades afterwards.

In 1936, there was a further controversy when the Australian national eight, preparing for the Berlin Olympics, was excluded from the Grand Challenge Cup because the crew was composed of policemen, deemed to be 'manual workers'. The resulting embarrassment persuaded the Amateur Rowing Association and the Stewards of Henley Royal Regatta of the need for change. On 9 June 1937, the offending references to manual labourers, mechanics, artisans and menial duties were deleted from the ARA rules; Henley's rules were changed the following day, coming into effect from the 1938 regatta.

In September 1997, World Rowing (then FISA, a French acronym for "International Federation of Rowing Societies") removed all references to amateurism in its rules and in December 1998 Henley followed suit. The regatta is therefore now entirely open.

=== International participation ===
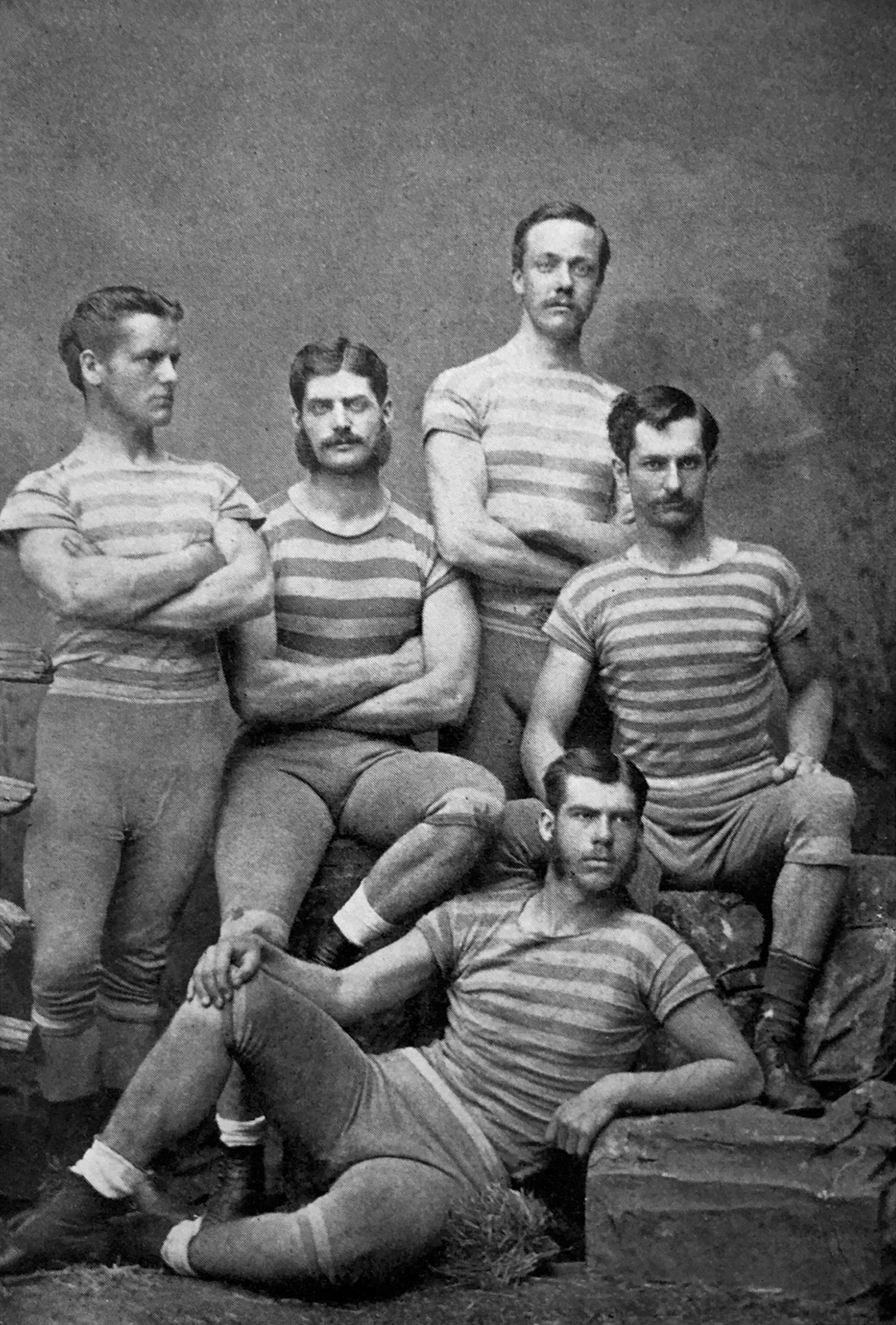
Columbia College, winners of the Visitors' Challenge Cup in 1878

The first 'overseas' entry to the regatta was in 1870 when Trinity College, Dublin entered the Grand, Ladies', Visitors' and Wyfold. As Dublin was at that time within the United Kingdom, this was not a foreign entry. TCD won the Visitors' and reached the final of the Ladies'.

The first international competitors came in 1878 when G.W. Lee of New Jersey and G. Lee of Boston entered the Diamonds, Shoe-wae-cae-mette BC of Monroe, Michigan, a crew of French Canadian watermen, entered the Stewards' and Columbia College entered the Stewards' and Visitors'.

Lee of Boston made little progress but Lee of New Jersey lost his heat in a very close race against Tom Edwards-Moss, the eventual winner. Shoe-wae-cae-mette, rowing with then-unusual swivel rowlocks, reached the final of the Stewards' but lost to London Rowing Club.

Columbia won the Visitors' Challenge Cup, becoming the first foreign winners of a Henley trophy.

Accusations that both G.W. Lee and the Shoe-wae-cae-mette crew were not amateurs, led to a new, tighter, definition of amateurism in 1879. Any entries from outside the United Kingdom had to be made on or before 1 March and had to be 'accompanied by a declaration made before Notary Public with regard to the profession of each member of the crew', which then had to be certified by the British Consul, the mayor, or the chief authority of the locality.

Under these new rules, Shoe-wae-cae-mette were refused entry in 1879 as were Hillsdale Boat Club of Michigan in 1882.

The Germania Ruder Club of Frankfurt became the first entry from continental Europe in 1880, losing in a heat of the Grand to London Rowing Club.

Foreign entries grew over the next twenty years, to the consternation of some who felt that the regatta should be restricted to domestic entries only. There were also a number of disputes over amateurism and the two issues were often bound up together, as in this letter to The Times from Edmond Warre, headmaster of Eton College in 1901:

I most earnestly desire that our amateur oarsmanship may be preserved from the deadly inroad of professionalism, which is already making a business of so much that ought only to be pleasure, and threatens to crush the life out of the sports of "merrie England". Let us restrict our Henley pots to the United Kingdom and set up a proper international regatta elsewhere, if that is thought desirable.

— Edmond Warre, The Times

W.H. Grenfell MP proposed a motion for a special meeting of the Stewards that:

This meeting…while fully prepared to promote the establishment of an international regatta upon a proper course and under suitable conditions, is of the opinion that Henley Regatta does not provide either a proper course or suitable conditions for international competitions.

— William Grenfell

He proposed amendments to the rules restricting entries to the United Kingdom, and for the Goblets and Diamonds to British subjects domiciled in the UK. Warre seconded his proposals. The Amateur Rowing Association canvassed its member clubs on the proposal and the results were decisive: all clubs opposed the proposals save for Oxford University Boat Club which supported them with the caveat 'Committee decide against foreign entries provided they can row other than Henley'.

At a special general meeting of the Stewards late in 1901, a motion moved by Colonel Makins 'that in the opinion of this meeting it is inexpedient that any alteration in the rules of the regatta be made at present' was carried by 19 votes to 5.

In 1906, Royal Club Nautique de Gand of Belgium became the first foreign crew to win the Grand Challenge Cup. A different Ghent Club, Sport Nautique de Gand took the Grand in 1907.

In advance of 1908, with the Olympic Regatta to be held on the Henley course in mid-July, the Stewards announced a temporary rule change excluding overseas entries from the 1908 regatta (which would take place two weeks before the Olympics). This led to criticism of the Stewards in the British and American press, particularly since it would not permit the Belgians to defend the Grand. The Stewards pointed out in a letter to The Times that the decision had been taken before the 1907 regatta and after consultation with the Belgians. A letter from Oscar Gregoire, President of the Belgian Rowing Federation was quoted:

In a year like 1908, which will see the Olympic Regatta take place at Henley…it is not reasonable to hold an international regatta 15 days previously…the Belgian holders of the Grand Challenge Cup would not have any object in going to defend it in 1908…

— Richard Burnell, Henley Royal Regatta: A celebration of 150 years

Overseas entries and wins at the regatta have continued to multiply. Since the 1960s, the open events in particular have almost exclusively become the province of national squad crews. Up to 2007, the Grand Challenge Cup had been won by overseas crews 46 times: 12 times by crews from Germany, 11 from the US, 9 from the USSR, 4 from Canada, 3 each from Belgium and Australia, 2 from the Netherlands, and 1 each from Switzerland, France, Bulgaria and Croatia.

Crews from the United States have also become frequent winners of the Ladies' Challenge Plate, Temple Challenge Cup and Princess Elizabeth Challenge Cup. In 1927, the Kent School Boat Club of Kent School in Connecticut was the first American secondary school to race at the Henley Royal Regatta.

=== Women ===
Women coxswains of male crews were permitted from 1975 and Christine Paul, cox of Furnivall Sculling Club in the Thames Challenge Cup, became the first female competitor in the regatta in that year.

There was much discussion about the introduction of events for women. The Stewards felt that they faced a dilemma: on the one hand it was argued that women's rowing would never flourish while there were no women's events at Britain's premier regatta; on the other it was clear that open women's events would be dominated by foreign competitors, while events closed to foreign competitors would not serve the desired purpose. Another difficulty was the length of the course. The standard distance for international women's races was at that time 1000 m. It was clear that races over the full Henley course (2112 m) would not be appealing to women's crews preparing for international championships.

Peter Coni, who was elected as chairman of the regatta's Committee of Management in 1978, was the first to allow women to race in exhibition races in 1983. However he deemed the experiment a failure and women were excluded until 1996 from the regatta. His ban caused a furore but he asserted that what he called the "women's squealing" was "more noisy, stupid and harmful to their cause than anything I can think of."

In 1978 Kingston Rowing Club sent in an entry for the Double Sculls Challenge Cup in the names of A.Hohl and P.Bird. The crew was in fact Great Britain internationals Astrid Ayling and Pauline Hart, who had made the entry under their maiden names. The regatta realised the subterfuge and Coni made a statement to the press in which he said that it was "sad that a long-established club should think it reasonable behaviour to make a deliberately false declaration". He added that the stewards had no fear of the Sex Discrimination Act.

==== Exhibition races ====
In 1979, the Committee announced that there would be exhibition events for women in 1981, with entries by invitation only:

The Stewards announced in December 1979 that they were considering the possibility of adding certain Events for Women to the Regatta programme. As a preliminary step two invitation events are being held this year, with racing from the Barrier start used for the Special Race for Schools. These events will enable the Stewards to assess the feasibility of including races over the shorter Course during the normal Regatta programme, and the desirability of the considerable extension to the hours of racing which any full Events for Women would necessarily involve.

— 1981 Henley Royal Regatta programme

The entries were limited to four in each event (Coxed Fours and Double Sculls); two from abroad and two from the UK. The standard was good, but it was reckoned that the course from the Barrier start (over 600 m longer than the international standard 1000 m) contributed to there being no close verdicts.

In 1982, a Single Sculls Event was added and the start was moved to Fawley so that the course was closer to 1000 m. As the intermediate start installations were required for the shorter distance, the races had to take place during intervals in the normal racing programme (the lunch or tea breaks) which meant that only the dedicated stayed to watch. This was a pity, since the final of the Women's Invitation Single was a highlight of the regatta, with Beryl Mitchell of Thames Tradesmen's Rowing Club (World Silver medallist in 1981) beating Stephanie Foster of Waiariki Rowing Club, New Zealand (World Bronze medallist in 1982) by one length. Astrid Ayling was also able to race legitimately, winning the Invitation Double Sculls event with Rosie Clugston. The time taken to install the start equipment at Fawley combined with the relative lack of crowd interest meant that the Stewards took the decision not to repeat the experiment in 1983.

==== Introduction of current events ====
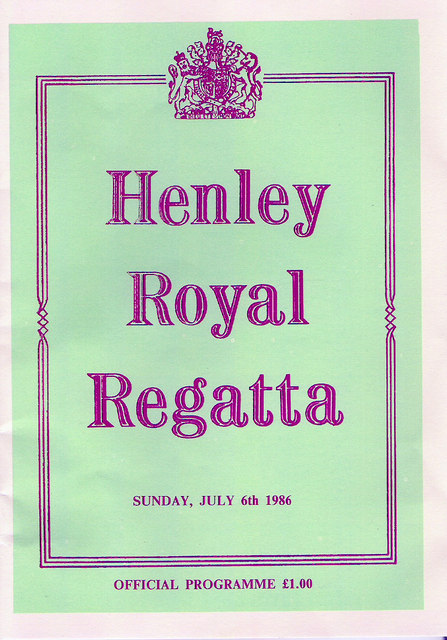
A programme of events from the 1986 regatta

The change of the international distance to 2000 m and the addition of a fifth day to the regatta in 1986 allowed the Committee of Management to revisit the decision. In 1993 the regatta introduced an open Women's Single Sculls event and from 1993 to 1996 this counted as a round of the FISA World Cup. The first winner was Maria Brandin of Sweden and she subsequently won a further four times. Fittingly, the prizegiver in 1993 was Peter Coni. In 1996, the Stewards purchased a silver cup as a challenge trophy and named it the Princess Royal Challenge Cup; it was presented for the first time in 1997.

An invitation event for women's eights was added in 1998. In 2000, this was replaced by an open women's eights event under the same rules as the Grand Challenge Cup. In 2002, the Remenham Challenge Cup was donated by Remenham Club as the trophy for this event. At the 2001 Regatta, an open event for Women's Quadruple Sculls was introduced. In 2003, this event became known as the Princess Grace Challenge Cup in memory of Princess Grace of Monaco. Her father, John B. Kelly Sr., had been controversially excluded from the Diamond Sculls in 1920 because of the regattas rules on amateurism; her brother, John B. Kelly Jr. had won the Diamonds Sculls in 1947 and in 1949. Princess Grace was the Regatta prizegiver in 1981.

At the Stewards' meeting in December 2016, it was agreed to equalise the number of events for Men and Women in the Open category, leading to the creation of three new events: the Women's Fours (Town Challenge Cup), the Women's Pairs (Hambleden Pairs Challenge Cup) and the Women's Double Sculls (Stonor Challenge Trophy). These were raced for the first time at the 2017 Regatta. In December 2019 the stewards announced the Island Challenge Cup (Student Women's Eight's). With a further two events for junior women's and club women's eights announced to run in the 2021 regatta.

=== Other regattas ===
==== 1908 Olympic Regatta ====
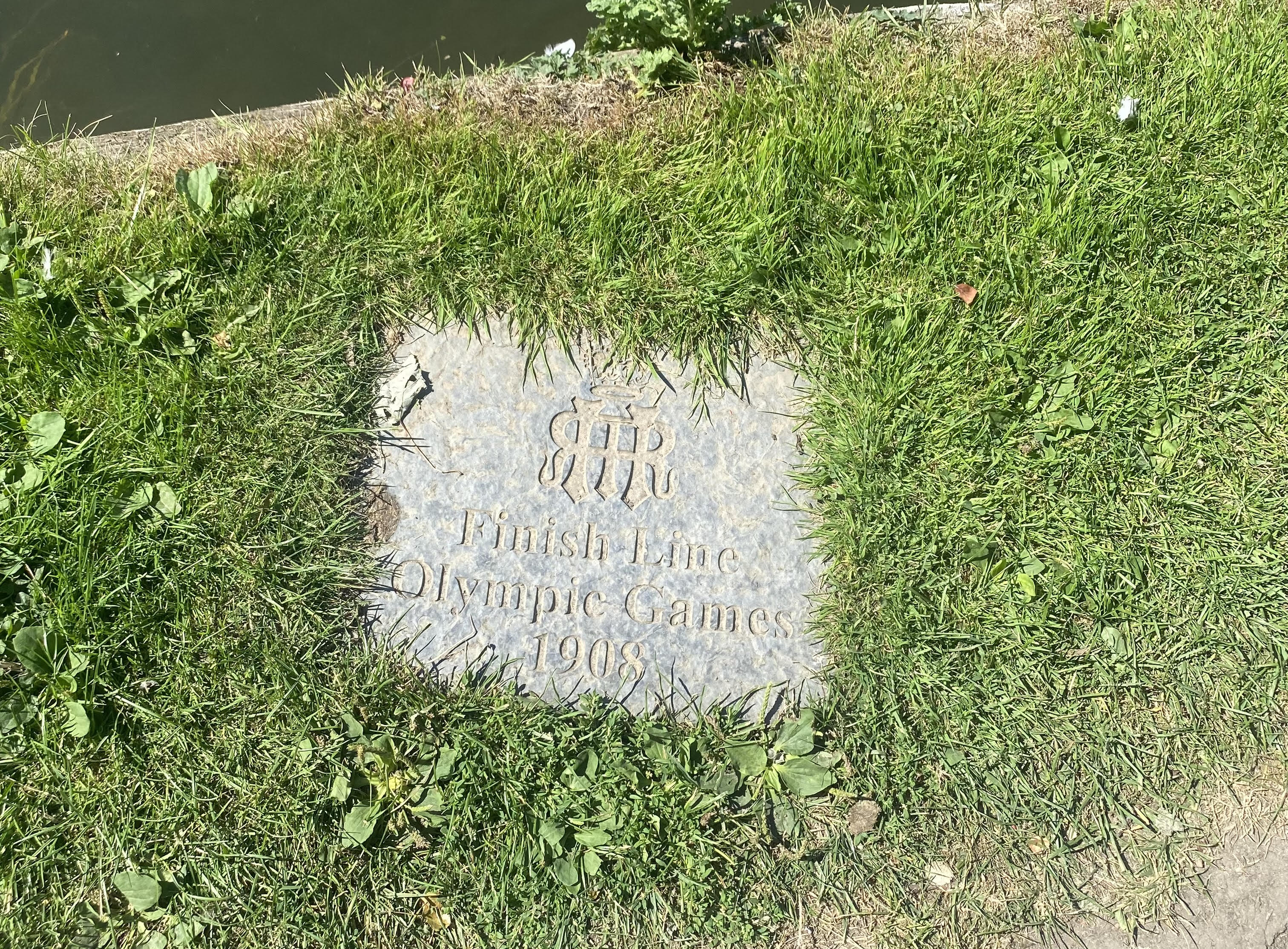
A plaque noting the 1908 Olympic rowing finish line

Henley hosted the rowing events of the London Olympic Games in mid-July 1908, two weeks after the Royal Regatta. The course was extended 270 yards (250 m) downstream and 60 yards (55 m) upstream, making it 1-mile (1.6 km) and 880 yards (800 m). Events for single sculls, coxless pairs, coxless fours and eights were offered but only the eights produced an international final.

==== 1919 Peace Regatta ====
A meeting arranged by Leander Club in January 1919 concluded that it was too soon to revive the regatta but asked the Stewards to arrange a "Peace Regatta" and a four-day regatta was duly staged. Competition was not for the usual Henley trophies but for different cups and some events were restricted to 'armed services' crews. King George V presented a Cup to the victors of eight-oared event for servicemen crews. The Australian first AIF crew won the final against a crew of Oxford university alumni servicemen. In time, and in spite of dogged resistance from the Australian War Memorial, the Victorian Rowing Association petitioned the King to express his intention for the Cup, and at his command the King's Cup became the perennial trophy to be presented to the Australian winning state representative men's eight at the annual Australian Rowing Championships.

==== 1945 Royal Henley Regatta ====
A two-day 'Royal Henley Regatta' (as opposed to Henley Royal Regatta) was staged between VE Day and VJ Day. Crews rowed three-abreast over a shortened course beginning at the Remenham Barrier. As in 1919, different trophies to the usual regatta prizes were on offer.

==== 1948 Olympic Regatta ====
The canoeing and rowing events for the 1948 London Olympic Games were contested in early August, a month after the Royal Regatta. The course was widened to accommodate three lanes and shortened to start at the top of Temple Island: the distance was approximately 1980 metres – 20 metres short of the standard international distance. Twenty seven nations competed and events for single sculls, double sculls, coxless pairs, coxed pairs, coxless fours, coxed fours and eights were offered.

The Olympic races in 2012 were held at Dorney Lake.

== Spectators ==
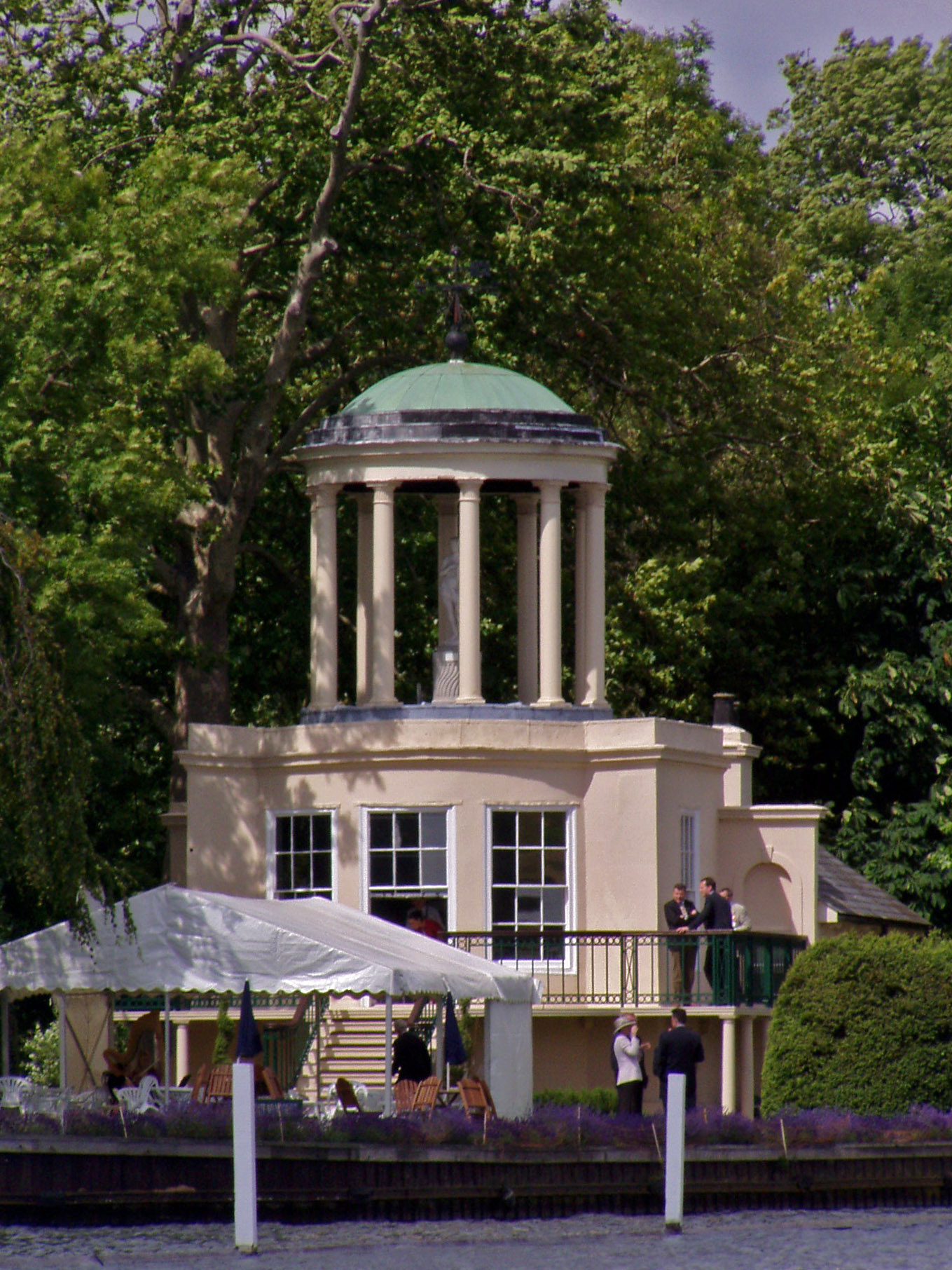
Temple Island – the start of the regatta course

The racing can be viewed from a number of locations along both banks of the Thames. Areas open to the general public are generally on the Berkshire (towpath) side of the river. Viewing opportunities on the other side of the river (Buckinghamshire) side are limited to the Phyllis Court club, private residences and areas for corporate entertainment. A channel of the river remains open throughout the regatta, hence racing can also be viewed from boats although mooring is tightly restricted.

=== Stewards' Enclosure ===
The enclosure situated on the Berkshire side, adjacent to the last part of the course and the finish line. It comprises two covered grandstands, a restaurant marquee, several bars, a bandstand and so on – all set in immaculately prepared lawns. It is only open to the Stewards of the Regatta, members of the Stewards' Enclosure and their guests. Overseas competitors are also given the opportunity to purchase tickets.

The Stewards' Enclosure as understood today, an enclosure open to members (elected by the Committee of Management of the Regatta) and their guests, came into being in 1919 with a membership of 300. This grew to 704 in 1939 and 1,500 in 1956. In 1980 the Stewards set a ceiling of 5,000. The waiting list for membership of the Stewards Enclosure is now several years long, although preference is given to people who have previously competed at the regatta. The waiting list has grown rapidly since the 1970s, when membership could be applied for and granted on the same day.

The Stewards' Enclosure is also known for a strict enforcement of its dress code. Men are required to wear a "lounge suit, blazer and flannels, or evening dress, and a tie". In the past, women were required to wear a dress or skirt that covers their knees, and are "encouraged to wear a hat" (although women wearing hats is often frowned upon in higher rowing circles). Anyone not suitably dressed can be refused entry, no matter their prestige in rowing or elsewhere. Talking on mobile phones is also prohibited, though their use for emails, texts, and photography is allowed. In 2021, following a petition by University of Oxford rower Georgia Grant that gained over 1500 signatures, Henley Royal Regatta changed the dress code in the Stewards' Enclosure, which was begun in the late 1970s, to allow women to wear jackets or blazers with trousers, or trouser suits.

The regatta prizegiving takes place in the Stewards' Enclosure after the conclusion of racing on Sunday.

=== Regatta Enclosure ===
The Regatta Enclosure is situated immediately downstream of the Stewards Enclosure and further away from the finish. This enclosure is open to all on payment of the admission fee. Competitors gain free access to this area. There is no dress code.

=== Remenham Club ===
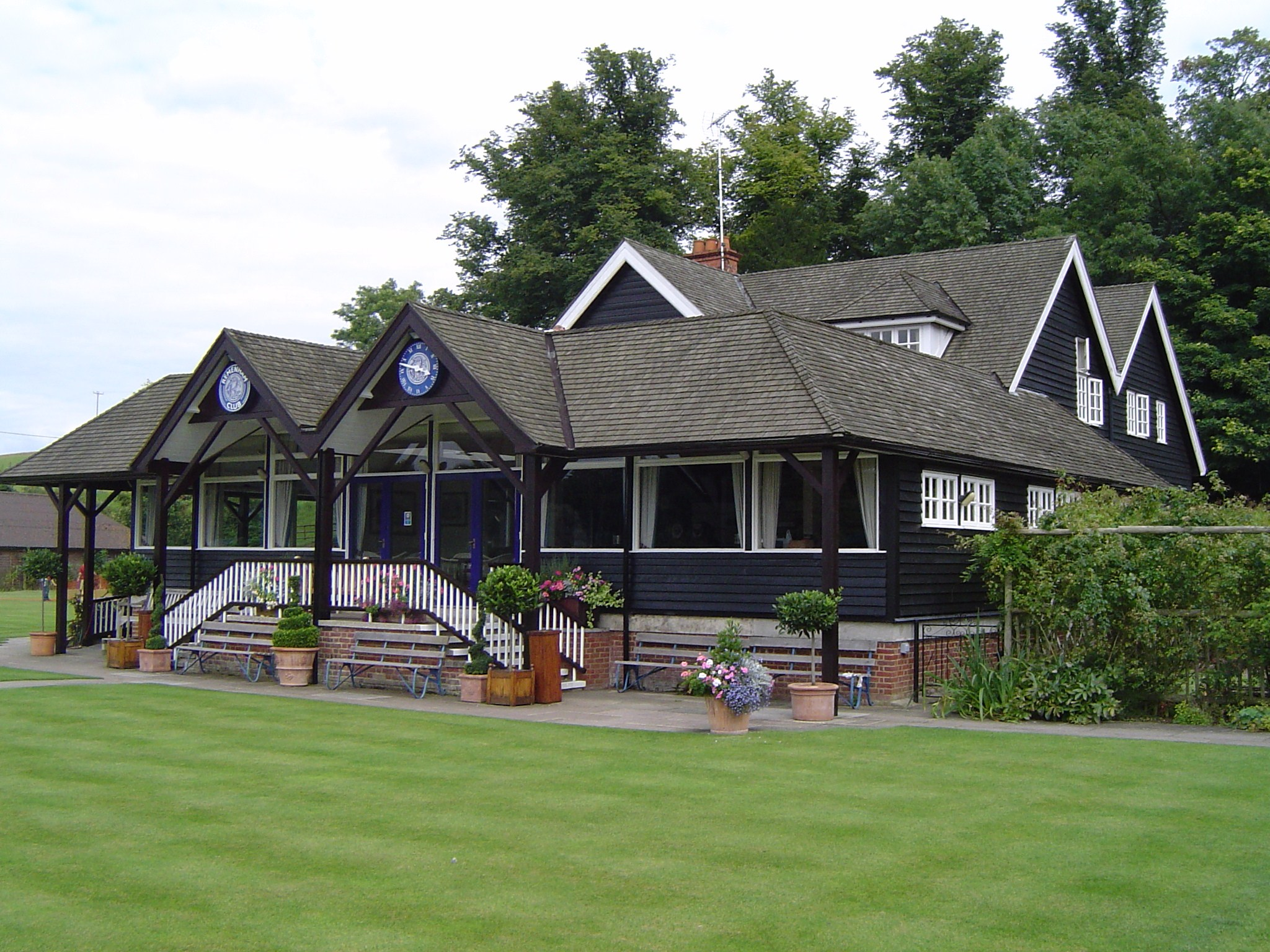
Remenham Club

Remenham Club is situated a little over halfway along the course on the Berkshire side of the river. It is a social club run by and for members of seven rowing clubs on the Thames (the "Founding Clubs"): Kingston Rowing Club, London Rowing Club, Molesey Boat Club, Staines Boat Club, Thames Rowing Club, Twickenham Rowing Club and Vesta Rowing Club. Remenham Club is open only to its members and guests. It has a similar dresscode to the Stewards Enclosure, though the rules on women's outfits are less restrictive.

=== Upper Thames Rowing Club ===
The clubhouse and frontage of the Upper Thames Rowing Club is on the Berkshire side of the river, immediately downstream of Remenham Club. It has historically had an informal atmosphere and no dresscode. It is only open to its members and their guests. In 2011, UTRC initiated the Upper Thames Enclosure to include a fairly relaxed dress code. UTRC lease the land downstream of their clubhouse to retailers, food vendors and bars.

=== Remenham Farm ===
Remenham Farm spans the riverside on the Berkshire side of the Thames from opposite the Fawley box to a point just upstream of the Barrier (approximately the 1100 m – 700 m points on the regatta course). It is owned by The Copas Partnership.

During the Regatta it runs hospitality enclosures at The Temple Island Enclosure and The Pavilion Enclosure, and bars including the Barn Bar. Remenham Farm is open to the public, however entrance fees apply for certain enclosures; boat moorings and camping pitches are also available.

=== Leander Club ===
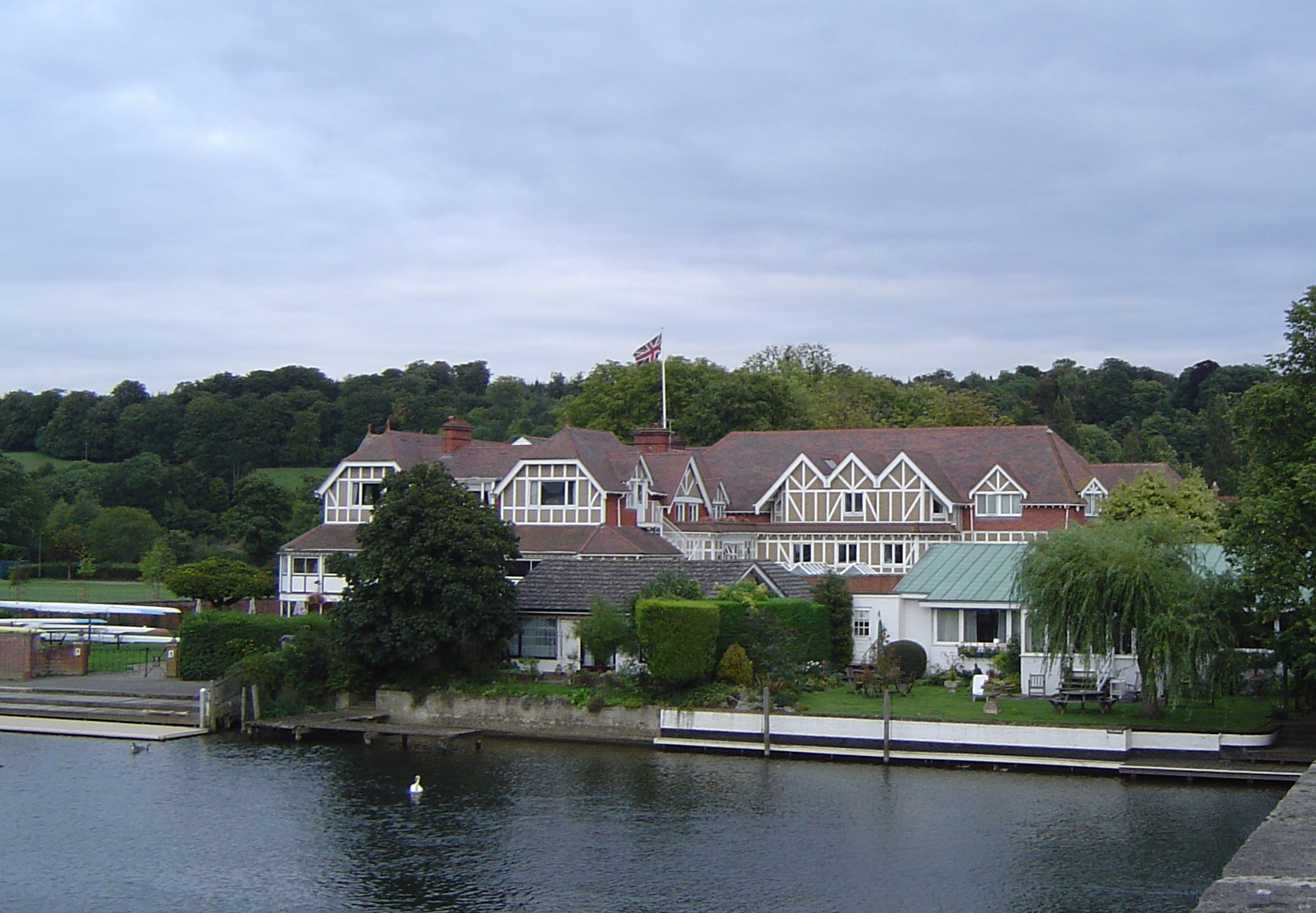
Leander Club

The clubhouse and grounds of Leander Club is situated on the Berkshire side of the river beyond the finish line of the regatta course, between the boat tents and Henley Bridge. Leander Club has a large marquee constructed for the regatta week and holds a large function on the Saturday night of the Regatta. It is open only to its members and their guests and has a formal dress code.

=== Phyllis Court ===
The Phyllis Court Club is situated on the Buckinghamshire side of the river, opposite the finish line. It is open only to its members and their guests. Although it has an excellent view of the finish line, it is not generally frequented by rowers, being principally a lawn sports club.

== Events ==
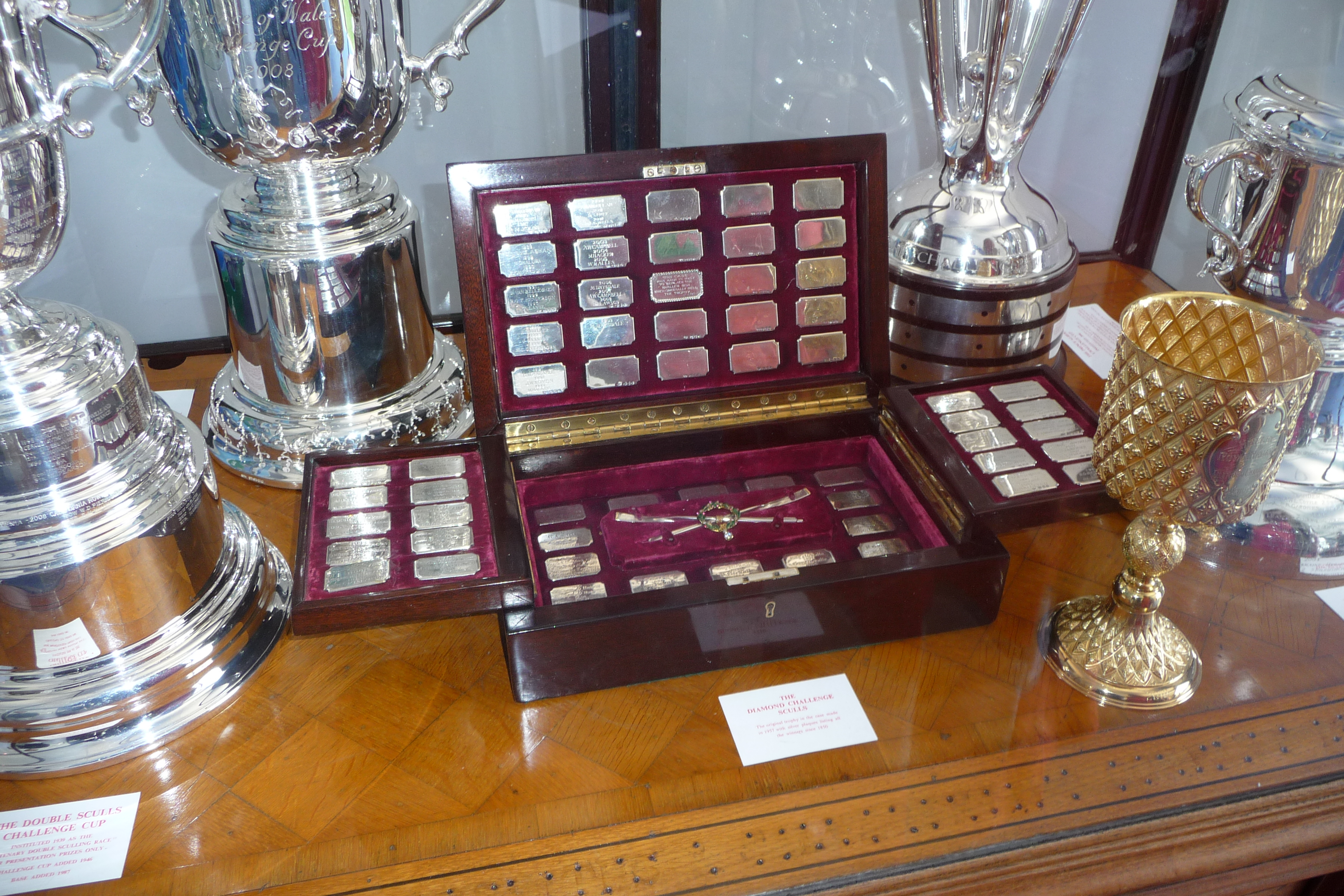
The Diamond Challenge Sculls Trophy

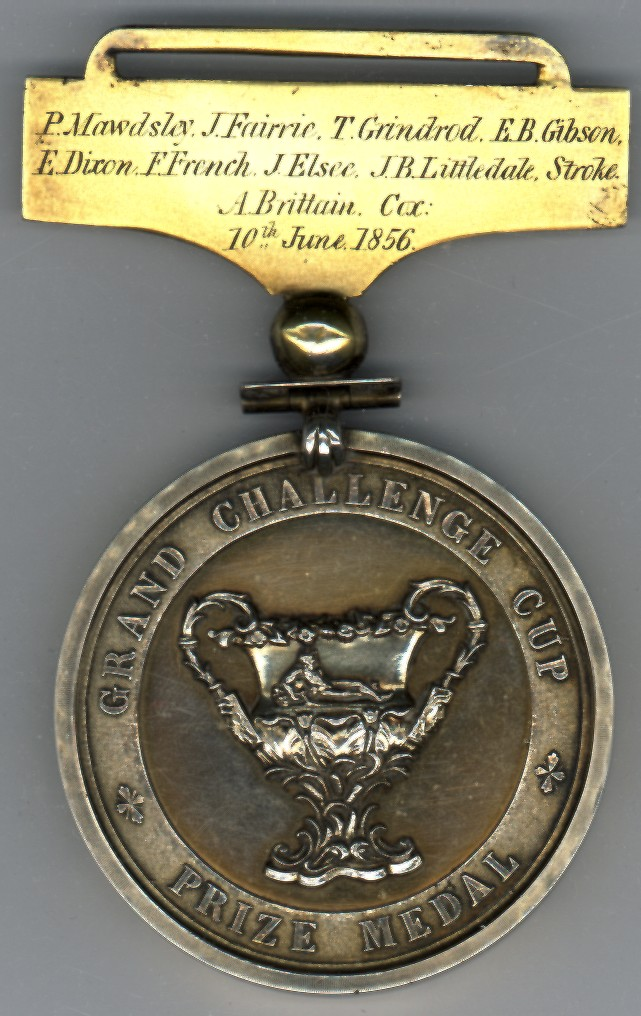
The Grand Challenge Cup medal from 1856

=== Current events ===
- Open Men
  - Grand Challenge Cup (8+) (since 1839)
  - Stewards' Challenge Cup (4-) (since 1841)
  - Queen Mother Challenge Cup (4x) (since 1981)
  - Silver Goblets & Nickalls' Challenge Cup (2-) (since 1845)
  - Double Sculls Challenge Cup (2x) (since 1946)
  - Diamond Challenge Sculls (1x) (since 1844)
- Intermediate Men
  - Ladies' Challenge Plate (8+) (since 1845)
  - Visitors' Challenge Cup (4-) (since 1847)
  - Prince of Wales Challenge Cup (formerly the Men's Quadruple Sculls) (4x) (since 2008)
- Club Men
  - Thames Challenge Cup (8+) (since 1868)
  - Wyfold Challenge Cup (4-) (since 1855)
  - Britannia Challenge Cup (formerly the Henley Prize) (4+) (since 1968)
- Student Men
  - Temple Challenge Cup (formerly the Henley Prize) (8+) (since 1990)
  - Prince Albert Challenge Cup (formerly the Men's Student Coxed Fours) (4+) (since 2004)
- Junior Men
  - Princess Elizabeth Challenge Cup (8+) (since 1946)
  - Fawley Challenge Cup (4x) (since 1992)
- Open Women
  - Remenham Challenge Cup (formerly the Henley Prize) (8+) (since 1998)
  - Princess Grace Challenge Cup (formerly the Women's Quadruple Sculls) (4x) (since 2001)
  - Princess Royal Challenge Cup (1x) (since 1982)
  - Town Challenge Cup (formerly the Women's Fours) (4-) (since 2017)
  - Hambleden Pairs Challenge Cup (formerly the Women's Pairs) (2-) (since 2017)
  - Stonor Challenge Trophy (formerly the Women's Double Sculls) (2x) (since 2017)
- Intermediate Women
  - Bridge Challenge Plate (8+) (since 2025)
  - Princess of Wales Challenge Trophy (4x) (since 2026)
- Club Women
  - Wargrave Challenge Cup (8+) (since 2021)
  - Danesfield Challenge Cup (4x) (since 2026)
- Student Women
  - Island Challenge Cup (8+) (since 2021)
  - Queen Victoria Challenge Cup (4x) (since 2026)
- Junior Women
  - Prince Philip Challenge Trophy (8+) (since 2021)
  - Diamond Jubilee Challenge Cup (formerly the Junior Women's Quadruple Sculls) (4x) (since 2012)

=== Discontinued events ===
- Town Challenge Cup (men), 1839–1883 (4+)
- District Challenge Cup for Fours, 1840–1847 (4+)
- Silver Wherry for local amateur scullers, 1846–1857 (1x)
- District Goblets for Pair Oars, 1858–1867 (2-)
- Presentation Cup for Fours Without Coxswain, 1869–1872 (4-)
- Public Schools Challenge Cup for Fours, 1879–1884 (4+)
- Special Race for Schools, 1974–1989 (8+)
- Prince Philip Challenge Cup, 1963–2003 (4+)
- Women's Invitation Coxed Fours, 1981–1982 (4+)
- Women's Invitation Double Sculls, 1981–1982 (2x)
- Women's Invitation Single Sculls, 1982 (1x)
- Women's Invitation Eights, 1998–1999 (8+)

== See also ==
- Disher Challenge Cup
- Henley Boat Races
- Henley-on-Todd Regatta
- Leander Club
- Remenham Club
- Rowing on the River Thames
- Royal Canadian Henley Regatta
