= Queen Victoria Challenge Cup =

Rowing event for women's quadruple sculls

- Venue: Henley Royal Regatta, River Thames
- Location: Henley-on-Thames, Oxfordshire
- Dates: 2026 – present

The Queen Victoria Challenge Cup is a rowing event for women's quadruple sculls at the annual Henley Royal Regatta on the River Thames at Henley-on-Thames in England. It is open to female members of a boat club of any university or college. Combined entries may only be made by no more than two college boat clubs of any one university. It has similar qualifying rules to the Island Challenge Cup.

== History ==
The introduction of three new events for women's quadruple sculls, in the Intermediate, Club and Student categories, was announced by the Stewards of Henley Royal Regatta on 9 December 2025.

On 26 March 2026 the names of these new events were announced as the Princess of Wales Challenge Trophy, the Danesfield Challenge Cup and the Queen Victoria Challenge Cup.

== Winners ==
Year	Winner	Runner Up	Ref
2026	Reading University 'A'	Algemene Amsterdamse Studenten Roeivereniging Skøll, NED	
