= Boustead Cup =

- The Boustead Cup
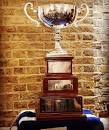
- Contested by
LRC	TRC
First Race	8 March 1947
Annual event since	1947
Current Champion	London (2026)
Course	The Championship Course; River Thames, London
Course length	4.2 miles (6.8 km)
Trophy	The Boustead Cup
- Number of wins
London	Thames
34	33
- There has been a ‘No Race’ in 13 of the years since 1947.

The Boustead Cup is an annual challenge of the Men's First Eight of London Rowing Club and Thames Rowing Club.

Taking place between February and March, upon a formal challenge from the previous years loser. The race is held over the Championship Course in London, England.

== History ==
The Boustead Cup was founded in 1947 by Guy Boustead as an Annual Race between London Rowing Club and Thames Rowing Club. Guy Boustead was the son of J M Boustead, who rowed for Oxford in the University Boat Races of 1875, 1876 and 1877 (the year of the famous “dead heat”).

== Course ==
Nearly all the 60 plus races to date have been raced on the ebb tide between Mortlake and Putney (the reverse of the University Boat Race course). The exceptions were in 2000, 2004, 2005 2010 and 2017 when the race was rowed between Putney and Mortlake.

== Results ==
67 Races Rowed

London - 34 Thames - 33

Results 1947 to 2026 Inclusive

Year	Date	Winner	Verdict
1947	08-Mar	LRC	3 lengths
1948	06-Mar	TRC	3 lengths
1949	19-Mar	LRC	¾ lengths
1950	18-Mar	TRC	Easily
1951	03-Mar	LRC	2 ½ lengths
1952	29-Mar	TRC	¾ lengths
1953	13-Dec	TRC	2 ½ lengths
1954	12-Dec	TRC	Easily
1955	No Race		
1956	December	LRC	
1957	December	LRC	
1958	08-Mar	TRC	4 ½ lengths
1959	15-Feb	TRC	
1960	No Race		
1961	12-Mar	TRC	“Comfortably”
1962	07-Apr	TRC	*Shortened Course
1963-67	No Race		
1968	09-Mar	LRC	2¼ lengths
1969	23 and 29 March	TRC	Decided on HORR results
1970	No Race		
1971	06-Mar	LRC	18 Secs
1972	No Date Recorded	TRC	
1973	17-Mar	LRC	
1974	17-Mar	LRC	
1975	02-Mar	LRC	
1976	07-Mar	LRC	
1977	13-Mar	LRC	
1978	05-Mar	LRC	
1979	04-Mar	LRC	
1980	24-Feb	LRC	
1981	01-Mar	TRC	
1982	No Race		
1983	20-Feb	LRC	
1984	19-Feb	TRC	“Wide margin”
1985	03-Mar	TRC	
1986	No Race		
1987	08-Mar	TRC	
1988	21-Feb	LRC	
1989	05-Mar	TRC	
1990	04-Mar	LRC	
1991	10-Mar	TRC	
1992	01-Mar	LRC	
1993	07-Mar	TRC	Easily
1994	06-Mar	LRC	
1995	26-Feb	LRC	
1996	10-Mar	LRC	
1997	09-Mar	LRC	50 seconds
1998	08-Mar	TRC	Not Rowed Out
1999	14-Mar	LRC	28 seconds
2000	05-Mar	TRC	LRC disqualified
2001	No Race		
2002	03-Mar	TRC	Canvas
2003	09-Mar	TRC	½ length
2004	22-Feb	LRC	1 m. 2 secs.
2005	27-Feb	LRC	20 seconds
2006	25-Feb	TRC	½ length (shortened course)
2007	11-Feb	LRC	30 seconds
2008	03-Feb	LRC	14 seconds (shortened course)
2009	01-Mar	LRC	1 lengths (to TRC flagpole)
2010	28-Feb	TRC	2½ lengths (shortened course)
2011	06-Mar	LRC	LRC Rowed Over
2012	18-Feb	LRC	TRC Disqualified
2013	17-Feb	LRC	5 lengths
2014	12-Apr	TRC	50 seconds
2015	15-Feb	TRC	48 seconds
2016	14-Feb	TRC	20 seconds
2017	25-Feb	TRC	23 seconds (shortened course)
2018	10-Feb	TRC	
2019	17-Feb	TRC	
2020-21	No Race		
2022	06-Mar	TRC	Easily
2023	11-Feb	TRC	2 Seats
2024	28-Jan	LRC	1¼ lengths
2025	09-Feb	TRC	¼ Length
2026	22-Mar	LRC	3½ Lengths

== Women's Cup ==
The Boustead Cup is also supplemented by The Rayner Cup, which was introduced in 2019 a challenge between the women's crews.
