= Thames Rowing Club =

Rowing club in London

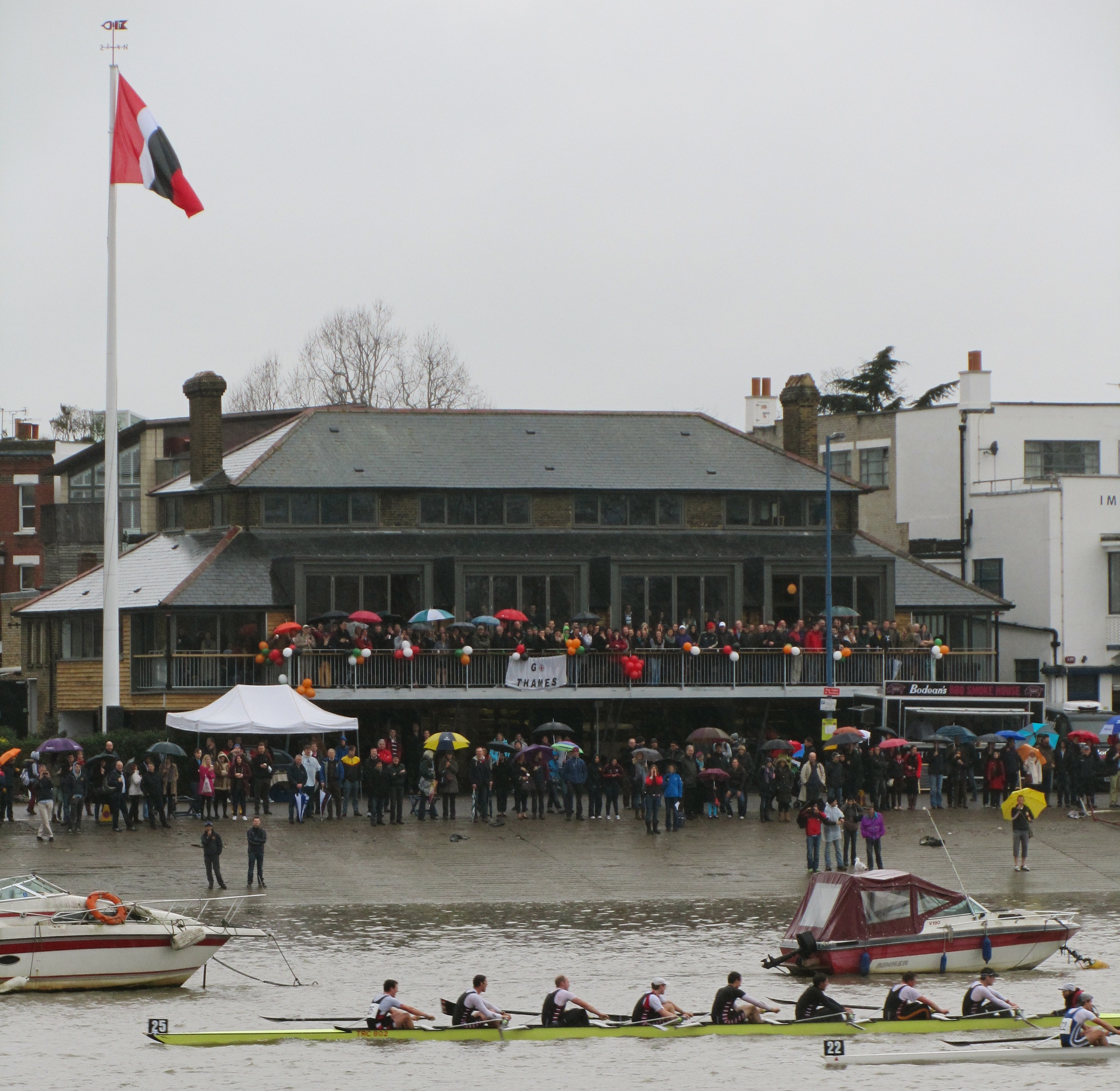

- Location: Putney, United Kingdom
- Coordinates: 51°28′11.3″N 0°13′14.7″W
- Home water: Tideway
- Founded: 1860
- Affiliations: British Rowing boat code TRC; Thames Regional Rowing Council, Remenham Club
- Website: thamesrc.co.uk

Events
- Boustead Cup (private match against London Rowing Club) (Feb/March)

Notable members
- Guin Batten; Miriam Batten; Jack Beresford; Julius Beresford; Stanley Bruce; Steve Fairbairn; Rupert Guinness; Jamie Hamilton; Elise Laverick; Reginald McKenna; Stanley Muttlebury; Dick Southwood

The Thames Rowing Club (Thames RC, TRC or, informally within the rowing community, Thames) is a rowing club based on the tidal Thames as it flows through the western suburbs of London. The TRC clubhouse stands on Putney Embankment. The club was founded in 1860.

As of July 2026, Thames had won events at Henley Royal Regatta 98 times.

Thames is one of the founding clubs of Remenham Club; a social club for rowers, with a clubhouse and grounds on the Henley Royal Regatta course. Thames hosts Cambridge University Women's Boat Club for their winter Tideway training ahead of the Women's Boat Race, and on race day itself. Thames also houses the Boat Race's media centre and administrative office.

The club colours are red, white and black in stripes, the white stripe lying between the red and black and being of half their width.

== History ==
=== Foundation ===
Thames Rowing Club was founded under the name City of London Rowing Club and according to its first rules, its objects were 'organised pleasure or exercise rowing'. The earliest surviving minutes of a club meeting are dated January 1861 but are headed 'City of London Rowing Club. Established 1860', and 1860 is commonly accepted as the year of foundation.

The initial members were chiefly clerks and salesmen working in London's textiles trade around Fore Street and St Paul's Churchyard. The early meetings are known to have taken place in the Lord Raglan public house in St Martin's-le-Grand. The club had boats at Simmons Boathouse (the building currently occupied by Chas Newens Marine) and a room at the Red Lion Hotel at the foot of Putney High Street. There were very few members at first, but the numbers rapidly increased, and in 1862, when club races were first started, the club numbered nearly 150.

In 1862, the club sought and gained the permission of Frank Playford, the only traceable member of "The Thames Club" which had rowed on the Tideway in the 1840s, to rename itself "The Thames Rowing Club".

=== Early successes ===
By 1864 a growing interest in competition led to the club's first recorded win, in a four-oared race against the Excelsior Boat Club of Greenwich. The club also put on a crew for the Metropolitan Junior Eights, started in 1865, and followed this up the next year by securing the Challenge Cup for Junior Eights at the first Metropolitan Regatta.

In 1870 the Club won at Henley Royal Regatta for the first time, taking the Wyfold Challenge Cup from the Oscillators Club of Surbiton and the Oxford Etonians in a race that, according to the Rowing Almanack, was ‘a pretty hollow affair, the Thames crew winning as they pleased from first to last.’

Over the next twenty years, Thames had its first great flowering, with 22 wins at Henley by 1890, including four victories in the most prestigious event, the Grand Challenge Cup for eights.

In 1877 the Thames Boathouse Company (Limited) was formed for the purpose of providing a boat and club house for the club. Money was raised by means of shares, the club and the company being kept quite distinct. The construction of the present Thames boathouse on a site about 300 yards above that of London Rowing Club followed and the building was completed in 1879 at a cost of over £3000.

Thames, under its captain James Hastie, was now established as a mainstay of amateur rowing in London, and as a rival to its Putney neighbour London Rowing Club. In 1879 Thames, like London, was one of the founder clubs of the Metropolitan Rowing Association which later became the Amateur Rowing Association (ARA). As a result, Thames was one of five clubs which had the right until 2012 to appoint representatives to the Council of the ARA and its successor British Rowing. The others were Leander Club, London Rowing Club, Oxford University Boat Club and Cambridge University Boat Club.

This early period was the time of the great Victorian amateur. Many Thames members were keen on all sports and the club itself also had an influence beyond rowing:

In December 1867, Thames organised a two and a half mile handicap steeplechase or paperchase similar to a cross-country race around Wimbledon Common as part of the oarsmen's winter training. These are generally accepted as the first open cross-country events to have taken place in Britain. One eventual result was the foundation of the Thames Hare and Hounds in October 1868, the first cross-country club, which would itself go on to an illustrious history.

Another addition to rowing training was boxing, with a ring frequently set up in the hall at the clubhouse. George Vize, a member of five winning crews at Henley, became amateur heavyweight champion of Britain in 1878 and a founder member of the Amateur Boxing Association. Boxing finally disappeared after the First World War, when the coach Steve Fairbairn ended it because of the damage caused to oarsmen's hands.

=== From the 20th Century to the present day ===
From the late 1890s into the first decade of the 20th century, Thames suffered a decline but recovered as the decade wore on, notably through the efforts of Julius Beresford and Karl Vernon.

After the First World War, Thames came under the influence of the coach Steve Fairbairn. Fairbairn was an Australian graduate of Cambridge, with boundless charisma and innovative (and highly controversial) views on training and technique. He was one of the major influences on the club and on the sport in general, becoming generally accepted as the father of modern rowing. Under his tutelage in the 1920s, and that of Julius Beresford, Thames reached new heights. Fairbairn left the club for London Rowing Club in 1925. The precise reasons are unclear but undoubtedly a clash with Julius Beresford was partly at the root: the two coaches, despite holding similar views on technique, were unable to get on. Under Beresford, Thames won four events at Henley in both 1927 and 1928, something which no club replicated in the 20th century.

At the same time, Thames was home to Britain's greatest ever single sculler. Jack Beresford (son of Julius) took Silver at the 1920 Amsterdam Olympics in an epic race with Jack Kelly, before going one better with Gold at Paris in 1924. He won the Diamond Sculls at Henley four times and the Wingfield Sculls for the Amateur championship of Great Britain a record seven times. Then, with Thames crews, he took three further Olympic medals: Silver in the eight in Antwerp, 1928, Gold in the coxless four in Los Angeles, 1932 and Gold in the double scull in Berlin, 1936. It would be 60 years before Steve Redgrave bettered his record.

Although never again reaching the heights of the late 1920s, Thames continued to be successful through the thirties and then, after the Second World War, into the forties and fifties. However, in the early sixties the club began to experience a marked decline in membership and standards. By the early seventies Thames had very few active members and came close to bankruptcy. The club went for 47 years from 1956 without a win by a men's crew at Henley Royal Regatta.

In 1972, Thames became one of the first British rowing clubs to admit women and rapidly became the powerhouse of women's rowing, a position it retains to this day. Thames women represented Great Britain at every Olympic Games between Los Angeles and Beijing. Sisters Guin Batten and Miriam Batten won Silver in the quadruple scull at the Sydney Olympics. Elise Laverick won Bronze in the double scull at the Athens Olympics in 2004 and in the Beijing Olympics in 2008. Since the founding of Henley Women's Regatta in 1987, the club has won there 55 times with the most recent wins being the aspirational club eights and club fours in 2025.

In 2003, Thames achieved an emphatic win in the Wyfold Challenge Cup ending 47 years without a men's win at Henley.

In 2005, Thames crews reached the finals of the Wyfold Challenge Cup, the Britannia Challenge Cup, the Princess Grace Challenge Cup (for women's quadruple sculls) and the Remenham Challenge Cup (for women's eights). The club won the last of these – the first win by a solely Thames women's crew at Henley Royal Regatta.

In 2006 came another win in the Wyfold Challenge Cup.

There then followed a period where, despite coming close, there were no Henley wins. However, in 2015 Thames won the Thames Challenge Cup for club eights, the first time the club had done so since 1934. This was followed in 2016 by a win in the Visitors' Challenge Cup for intermediate coxless fours – the first win for Thames in this event.

In 2017, there was an unprecedented achievement: two Thames crews reached the final of the Thames Challenge Cup, with Thames A beating Thames B by 5 lengths.

The following year, Thames retained the Thames Challenge Cup, and won the Britannia Challenge Cup for the first time in its history, setting a course record in the process.

There were no wins in 2019, and in 2020 the regatta did not take place owing to the COVID-19 pandemic.

In 2021, Thames reached four Henley finals for the first time since 2005: the Thames Challenge Cup, the Wyfold Challenge Cup, the Princess Grace Challenge Cup and the new Wargrave Challenge Cup for club women's eights, going on to win the Thames and the Wyfold (the latter for the first time since 2006).

At the 2022 regatta, Thames again reached four finals – this time of the Wargrave Challenge Cup, Thames Challenge Cup, Wyfold Challenge Cup and Britannia Challenge Cup. There were wins in all but the Thames, to give the club its most successful Henley Royal Regatta since 1928. In the final of the Wargrave, the Thames crew set new records to all of the timing markers.

At Henley Royal Regatta 2025 Thames won the inaugural Bridge Challenge Plate for intermediate women, establishing Fawley and finish records and equalling the Barrier record set by Leander Club earlier in the regatta.

In 2026, Thames again reached four Henley Royal Regatta finals, winning the Thames Challenge Cup, Wargrave Challenge Cup and Wyfold Challenge Cup. In an echo of 2017, the finalists in the Wargrave were Thames RC A and Thames RC B..

Rowing by older oarsmen (and more recently oarswomen) has been a part of the club's activities throughout its history, but has increased since the 1970s in line with more national and FISA (international) Masters Competition now on offer. A group of casual and veteran men came into existence in the 1970s; separate groups of masters oarsmen and women of different ages have since arisen from time to time.

== Clubhouse ==
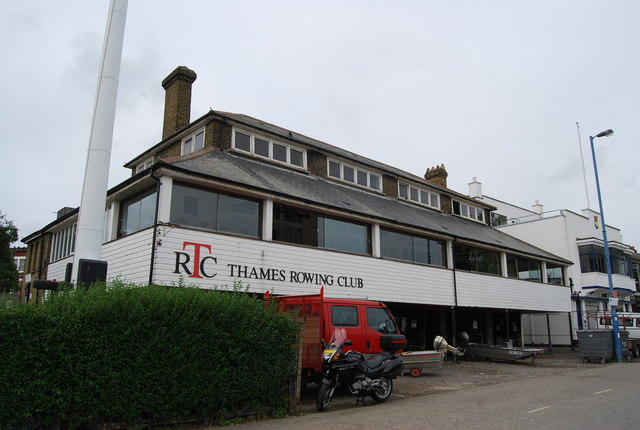
Clubhouse before 2011 renovations

The clubhouse itself was constructed in 1879 with several later additions. In 2005, the club opened a new building behind the clubhouse, named in memory of former club president and benefactor Alan Burrough, providing additional training facilities and boat storage. In May 2011, work began on substantial alterations and improvements to the clubhouse. The clubhouse is an approved venue for wedding and civil partnership ceremonies.

== Results ==
=== Summary of Wins at Henley Royal Regatta ===
Event	Event level	Boat type	Thames Wins	Composite Wins with Thames athletes	Total Wins	First win	Most recent win
Grand Challenge Cup	Premier Men's	Eights	8	0	8	1876	1948
Women's Invitation Eights	Premier Women's	Eights	0	1	1	1999	1999
Remenham Challenge Cup	Premier Women's	Eights	1	3	4	2004	2009
Bridge Challenge Plate	Intermediate Women's	Eights	1	0	1	2025	2025
Thames Challenge Cup	Club Men's	Eights	17	0	17	1872	2026
Wargrave Challenge Cup	Club Women's	Eights	4	0	4	2022	2026
Stewards' Challenge Cup	Premier Men's	Coxless Fours	17	0	17	1880	1956
Visitors' Challenge Cup	Intermediate Men's	Coxless Fours	1	2	3	2016	2026
Wyfold Challenge Cup	Club Men's	Coxless Fours	21	0	21	1870	2026
Women's Quadruple Sculls	Premier Women's	Quadruple Sculls	0	1	1	2002	2002
Britannia Challenge Cup	Club Men's	Coxed Fours	5	0	5	2018	2025
Silver Goblets & Nickalls' Challenge Cup	Premier Men's	Pair-oars	9	0	9	1877	1949
Centenary Double Sculls	Premier Men's	Double Sculls	1	0	1	1939	1939
Diamond Challenge Sculls	Premier Men's	Single Sculls	5	0	5	1899	1926
All Events			90	7	97	1870	2026

=== Full List of Wins at Henley Royal Regatta ===
(Composites marked with an asterisk)

Wins
Year	Event
1870	Wyfold Challenge Cup
1871	Wyfold Challenge Cup
1872	Thames Challenge Cup
1872	Wyfold Challenge Cup
1873	Thames Challenge Cup
1874	Thames Challenge Cup
1875	Wyfold Challenge Cup
1876	Grand Challenge Cup
1877	Silver Goblets
1878	Grand Challenge Cup
1880	Silver Goblets
1880	Stewards' Challenge Cup
1881	Silver Goblets
1883	Stewards' Challenge Cup
1884	Wyfold Challenge Cup
1886	Stewards' Challenge Cup
1886	Wyfold Challenge Cup
1888	Grand Challenge Cup
1888	Wyfold Challenge Cup
1889	Grand Challenge Cup
1889	Stewards' Challenge Cup
1890	Thames Challenge Cup
1891	Stewards' Challenge Cup
1893	Thames Challenge Cup
1894	Stewards' Challenge Cup
1894	Wyfold Challenge Cup
1898	Silver Goblets & Nickalls' Challenge Cup
1899	Diamond Challenge Sculls
1905	Thames Challenge Cup
1908	Wyfold Challenge Cup
1909	Stewards' Challenge Cup
1911	Silver Goblets & Nickalls' Challenge Cup
1911	Stewards' Challenge Cup
1912	Silver Goblets & Nickalls' Challenge Cup
1919	Fawley Cup
1920	Diamond Challenge Sculls
1920	Thames Challenge Cup
1920	Wyfold Challenge Cup
1922	Wyfold Challenge Cup
1923	Grand Challenge Cup
1924	Diamond Challenge Sculls
1925	Diamond Challenge Sculls
1925	Wyfold Challenge Cup
1926	Diamond Challenge Sculls
1926	Stewards' Challenge Cup
1927	Grand Challenge Cup
1927	Stewards' Challenge Cup
1927	Thames Challenge Cup
1927	Wyfold Challenge Cup
1928	Grand Challenge Cup
1928	Silver Goblets & Nickalls' Challenge Cup
1928	Stewards' Challenge Cup
1928	Thames Challenge Cup
1929	Silver Goblets & Nickalls' Challenge Cup
1929	Wyfold Challenge Cup
1931	Wyfold Challenge Cup
1932	Stewards' Challenge Cup
1934	Thames Challenge Cup
1939	Centenary Double Sculls
1947	Stewards' Challenge Cup
1948	Grand Challenge Cup
1948	Stewards' Challenge Cup
1949	Silver Goblets & Nickalls' Challenge Cup
1951	Stewards' Challenge Cup
1952	Stewards' Challenge Cup
1955	Wyfold Challenge Cup
1956	Stewards' Challenge Cup
1999	Women's Invitation Eights *
2002	Women's Quadruple Sculls *
2003	Wyfold Challenge Cup
2004	Remenham Challenge Cup *
2005	Remenham Challenge Cup
2006	Wyfold Challenge Cup
2008	Remenham Challenge Cup *
2009	Remenham Challenge Cup *
2015	Thames Challenge Cup
2016	Visitors' Challenge Cup
2017	Thames Challenge Cup
2018	Thames Challenge Cup
2018	Britannia Challenge Cup
2021	Thames Challenge Cup
2021	Wyfold Challenge Cup
2022	Wargrave Challenge Cup
2022	Britannia Challenge Cup
2022	Wyfold Challenge Cup
2023	Thames Challenge Cup
2023	Wargrave Challenge Cup
2023	Britannia Challenge Cup
2024	Thames Challenge Cup
2024	Wargrave Challenge Cup
2024	Britannia Challenge Cup
2025	Visitors' Challenge Cup *
2025	Bridge Challenge Plate
2025	Britannia Challenge Cup
2026	Thames Challenge Cup
2026	Wargrave Challenge Cup
2026	Wyfold Challenge Cup
2026	Visitors' Challenge Cup *

=== Wins at Henley Women's Regatta ===
Wins
Year	Event
1988	Open Eight (rowing as GB squad) *
1988	Open Coxless Pair (rowing as GB squad)
1989	Club Eight
1990	Open Eight *
1990	Open Coxless Four *
1990	Lightweight Coxless Four *
1990	Lightweight Double Scull *
1990	Club Eight
1991	Invitation Coxless Four (rowing as GB squad) *
1991	Open Coxless Pair (rowing as GB squad) *
1992	Club Eight
1993	Open Coxless Four *
1993	Open Coxless Pair *
1994	Open Coxless Four *
1994	Club Eight
1995	Open Eight (rowing as Nautilus) *
1995	Open Coxed Four
1995	Lightweight Coxless Pair *
1995	Club Eight
1996	Open Coxless Four
1996	Lightweight Quadruple Scull *
1997	Open Eight *
1997	Open Coxless Four
1997	Lightweight Quadruple Scull
1997	Lightweight Coxless Pair
1997	Club Eight
1998	Open Coxed Four
1998	Open Quadruple Scull
1999	Club Eight
2000	Open Coxless Pair *
2001	Open Coxed Four
2001	Open Double Scull *
2001	Open Single Scull
2001	Lightweight Double Scull
2002	Open Eight *
2002	Open Single Scull
2002	Lightweight Double Scull
2002	Club Eight
2003	Open Double Scull
2004	Open Eight
2005	Lightweight Quadruple Scull
2005	Intermediate Eight
2006	Elite Single Scull
2006	Elite Lightweight Quadruple Scull
2007	Intermediate Club Eight
2008	Elite Eight *
2009	Elite Coxless Four *
2010	Elite Single Scull
2010	Intermediate Club Eight
2013	Senior Double Scull
2013	Club Coxed Four
2014	Intermediate Club Eight
2015	Senior Coxless Four
2017	Elite Lightweight Coxless Pair
2017	Senior Lightweight Single Scull
2019	Aspirational Club Eight
2022	Aspirational Club Eight
2023	Aspirational Club Eight
2024	Championship Double Scull *
2024	Aspirational Club Eight
2025	Aspirational Club Eight
2025	Aspirational Club Coxless Four

=== Recent wins at British Rowing Championships ===
(Composites marked with an asterisk)

Wins
Year	Event
2000	Women 8+*, Women L4x
2001	Women 4+, Women 8+, Women L2x
2002	Women 8+*, Women L2-,
2004	Women 2-*, Women 4+, Women 8+
2005	Women 4+, Women L4x
2006	Women 1x, Women 4+, Women L1x, Women L4x
2007	Women 4+
2008	Women 8+, Open L1x
2010	Women J18 4x*
2024	Op 4-, W 4-, Mixed 8+
2025	Mixed 8+

== See also ==
- Imperial College Boat Club – British university rowing club
- Leander Club – British rowing club
- London Rowing Club – British rowing club
- Rowing on the River Thames
