= Remenham Club =

Private club in Berkshire, England

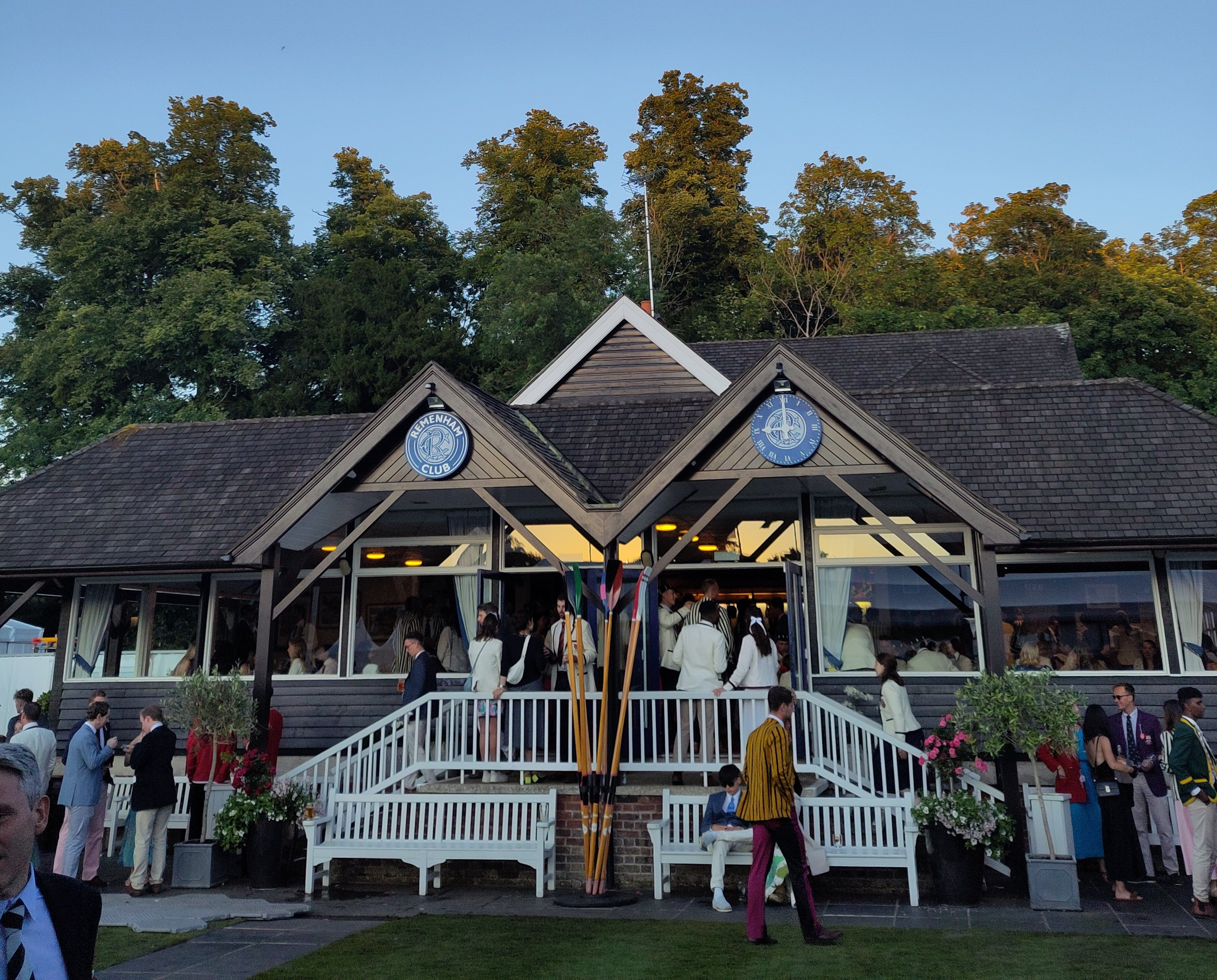
Remenham Club on Saturday of Henley Royal Regatta in 2024.

The Remenham Club is a private members club near the village of Remenham on the Berkshire bank of the River Thames near Henley-on-Thames, on the reach of the river that plays host to the annual Henley Royal Regatta. Up to 2,000 members and visitors attend annually to watch the regatta.

It was formed in 1909 by members of six amateur rowing clubs (known as the "founding clubs") on the River Thames:

- Kingston Rowing Club
- London Rowing Club
- Molesey Boat Club
- Staines Boat Club
- Thames Rowing Club
- Twickenham Rowing Club

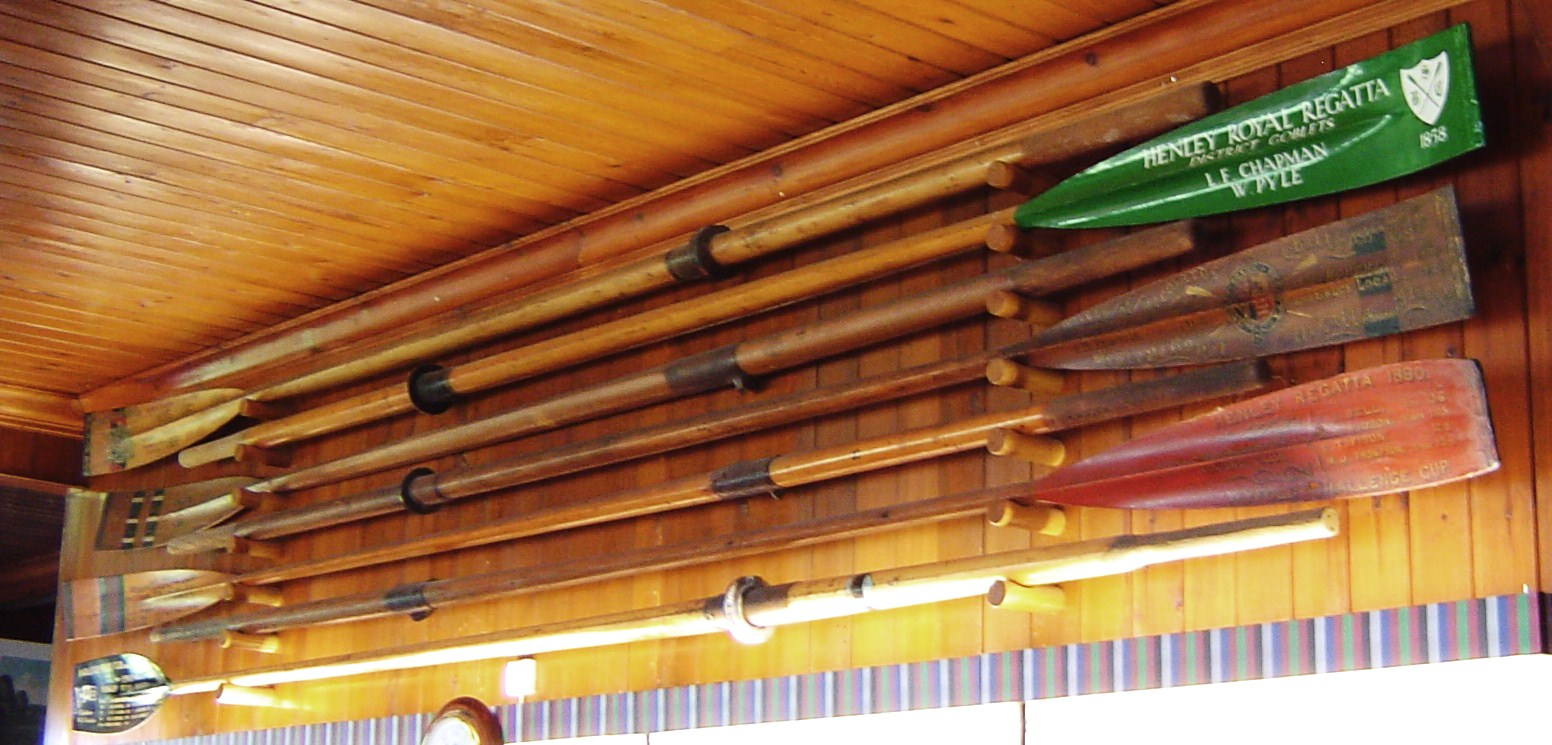
Trophy oars of the seven clubs displayed above the bar.

The seventh founding club, Vesta Rowing Club, was invited to join shortly after the second World War. Although originally open to any past or present member of a rowing club affiliated to the Amateur Rowing Association, in 1947 membership was restricted to members of the founding clubs. Currently, those wishing to join must have raced competitively for a period of years with their founding club, won enough status points, and displayed sufficient proficiency in oarsmanship to qualify.

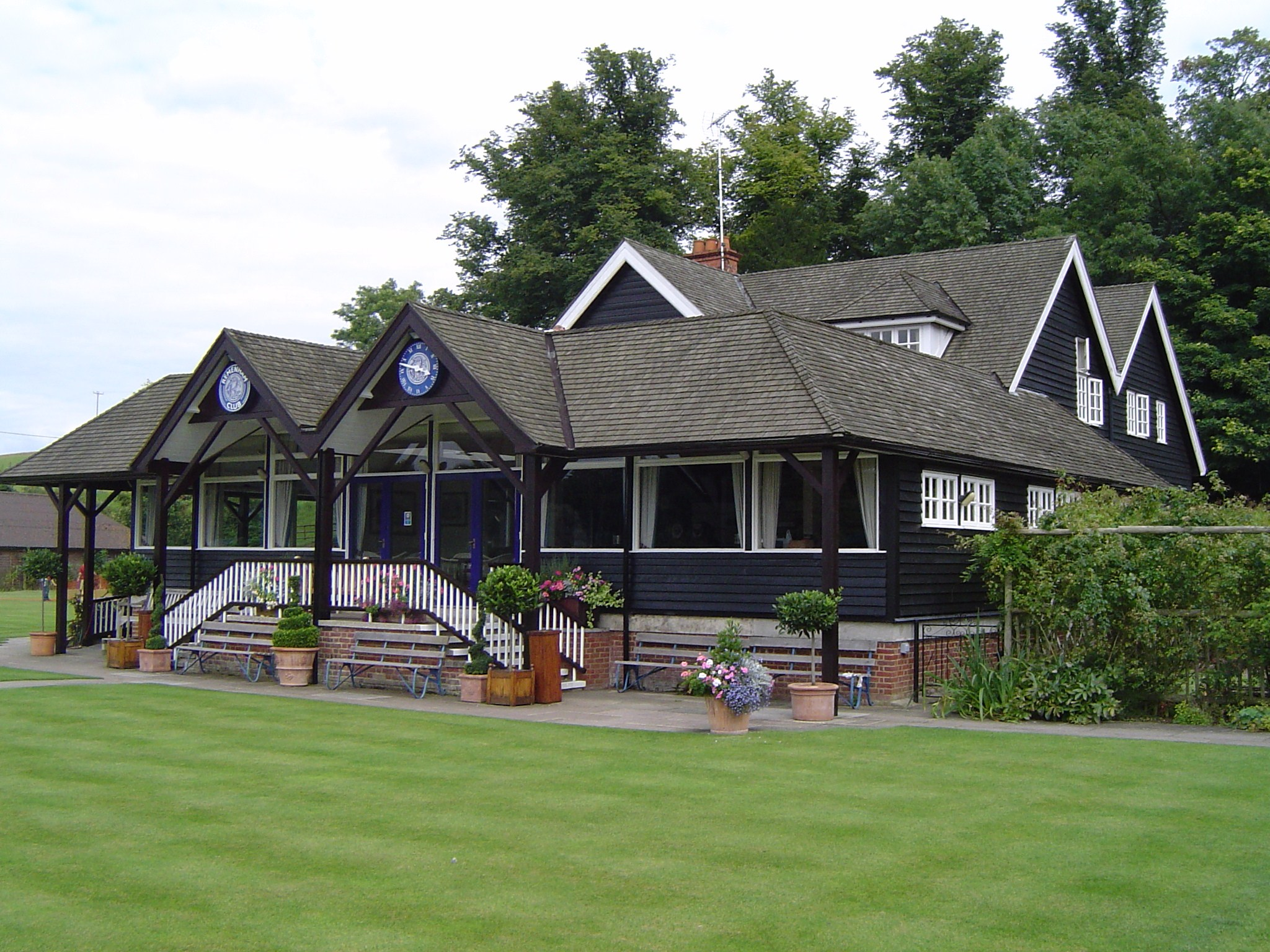
Remenham Club in 2008

Remenham Club is a social club only as members are not allowed to race under the club's name. However, it does host the annual Remenham Challenge, a head race reserved for members of the founding clubs and close associates.

Situated approximately halfway down the Henley Royal Regatta course, attendees can watch the regatta from a marquee installed on "the mound". During the regatta, the club also offers a bar, food and, in recent years, a DJ. The bar is staffed by members of Wadham College Boat Club who are in turn considered guests of the club and may attend in future years.

The club acts as the finish line for the Henley Women's Regatta.

== See also ==
- Rowing on the River Thames
