= Wargrave Challenge Cup =

Rowing event for women's eights

- Venue: Henley Royal Regatta, River Thames
- Location: Henley-on-Thames, Oxfordshire
- Dates: 2021 – present

The Wargrave Challenge Cup is a rowing event for women's eights at the annual Henley Royal Regatta on the River Thames at Henley-on-Thames in England. It is open to female crews from all eligible clubs (not university, college or school) and rowers who are not former or current internationals.

== History ==
The introduction of a new event for club women's eights was announced by the Stewards of Henley Royal Regatta on 10 December 2019, along with the plan for it to be raced for the first time at the 2021 Regatta, making use of the extra space in the racing schedule given by extending the regatta to six days. A year later it was announced that the new event would be named the Wargrave Challenge Cup.

== Past winners ==
| Year | Winner | Runner Up | Ref |
|---|---|---|---|
| 2021 | Leander Club | Thames Rowing Club 'A' | |
| 2022 | Thames Rowing Club 'A' | Leander Club | |
| 2023 | Thames Rowing Club 'A' | Leander Club | |
| 2024 | Thames Rowing Club 'A' | London Rowing Club 'A' | |
| 2025 | Molesey Boat Club 'A' | Leander Club | |
| 2026 | Thames Rowing Club 'A' | Thames Rowing Club 'B' | |
