= Bridge Challenge Plate =

Rowing competition

- Venue: Henley Royal Regatta, River Thames
- Location: Henley-on-Thames, Oxfordshire
- Dates: 2025 – present

The Bridge Challenge Plate is one of the events at Henley Royal Regatta on the River Thames at Henley-on-Thames in England. Crews of women's eight-oared boats below the standard of the Remenham Challenge Cup can enter, although international standard heavyweight crews are not permitted to row in the Bridge Challenge Plate.

== History ==
The introduction of the Bridge Challenge Plate was announced by the Stewards of Henley Royal Regatta on 10 December 2024.

== Winners ==
Year	Winner	Runner-up	ref
2025	Thames Rowing Club 'A'	Oxford Brookes University	
2026	Molesey Boat Club & University of London	Thames Rowing Club	
