= Academic scarf =

Academic dress

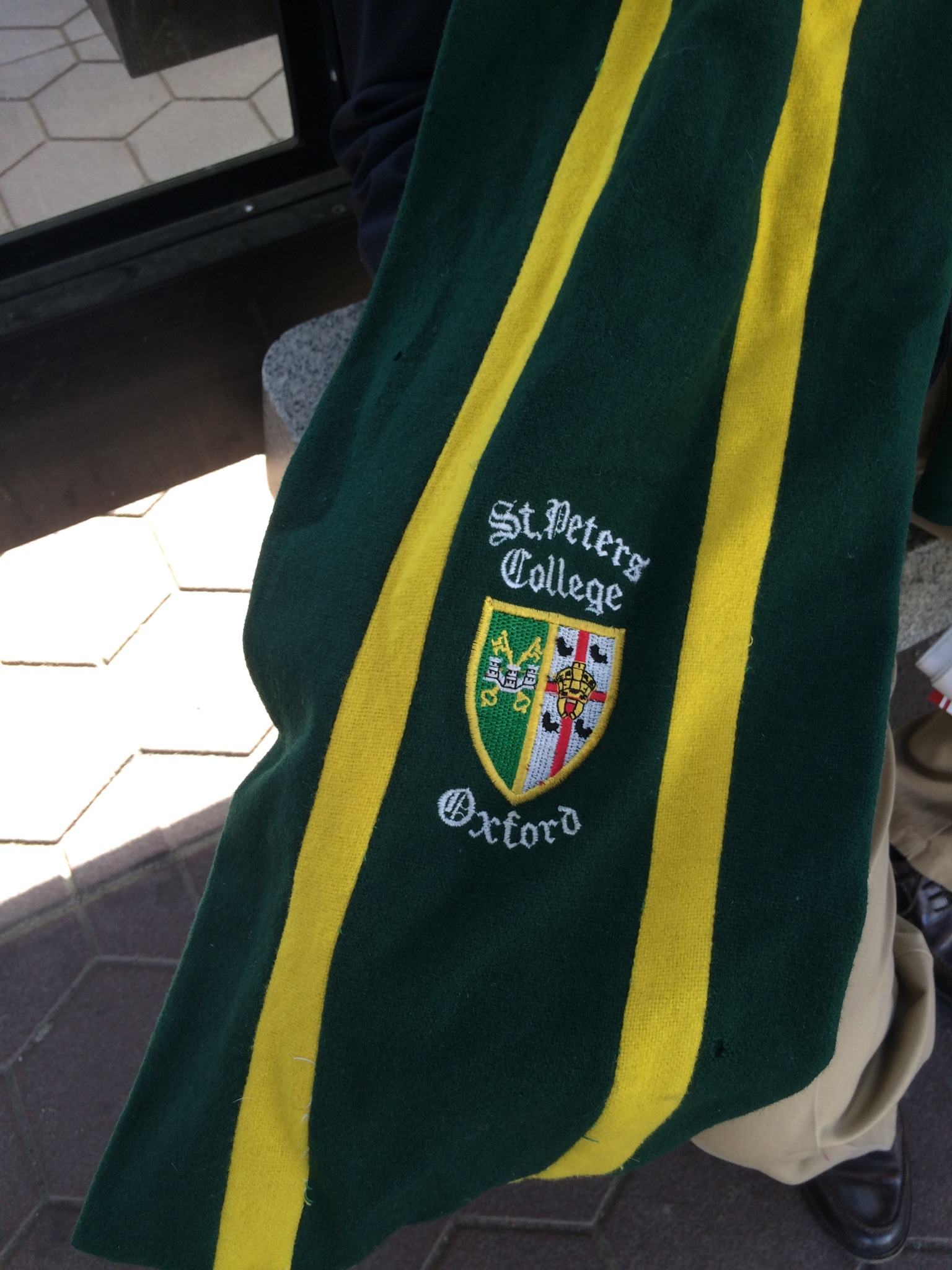
Academic scarf from St Peter's College, Oxford.

The wearing of academic scarves is a tradition found at many colleges and universities in English-speaking countries, and particularly in the United Kingdom and Ireland. Sets of two or more coloured stripes have traditionally been used as part of the distinctive visual identity of these institutions. The scarves are usually made of Saxony wool and traditionally 6 feet (c. 2 m) long. The traditional vertical stripes were (according to one source) adopted first at the University of Cambridge during the Second World War when material scarcity created scarves made of strips of wool sewn together rather than woven into the fabric.

The colours are often derived from the colours of the official coat of arms and/or the varsity colours, and are used in clothing and symbols of all kinds, from ties to trophies, but notably in the long woollen winter scarves that students and alumni wear to show their pride in their institutions. Some universities have different scarves for different faculties and even for undergraduates and postgraduates. Some may even have a 'combination scarf' where one side is in the university's colours and the other the faculty, etc. colours. Traditionally, academic scarves would not have further embroidery on them, such as arms or logos, as the stripes are sufficient to identify the scarf's origins and affiliation; however, at some universities such as Cambridge it has become usual for scarves to be embroidered with the college arms. Furthermore, universities might change their design and colours from time to time, usually during re-branding exercises, or if there is not an 'official' version that has been widely used. For example, the University of Manchester was created in 2004 by merging two previous institutions, and adopted the new colours of purple and gold, along with changing scarf colours.

At some universities, in addition to collegiate scarves, there are also several non-collegiate scarves which have a well-established meaning. For example, those representing the university in sport may be entitled to wear a particular scarf, depending on their level of achievement, or a university department or club may have its own scarf. In addition, some colleges and universities have (for example) separate scarves for senior clubs such as their Boat Clubs.^{[b]}

Academic scarves are to be distinguished from other types of scarves that are officially sold by the institution themselves which often use different colours and are embroidered with logos and other emblem, or designed/made differently to traditional academic scarves.

== Australia ==
=== La Trobe University ===
La Trobe University

=== University of Adelaide ===
Aquinas College	Kathleen Lumley College	Lincoln College
St Ann's College	St. Mark's College

=== University of Melbourne ===
Trinity College	Janet Clarke Hall	Medley Hall
Ormond College	Queen's College	St Hilda's College

=== University of New England ===
Austin College	Drummond and Smith College	Earle Page College

=== University of New South Wales ===
Colombo House	Fig Tree Hall	Goldstein College
New College	Philip Baxter College	University of New South Wales Hall

=== University of Queensland ===
Cromwell College	Duchesne College	Emmanuel College
Grace College	Gatton Halls of Residence	International House
King's College	St John's College	St Leo's College
Union College	The Women's College

=== University of Sydney ===
Sancta Sophia College	St Andrew's College	St John's College
St Paul's College	Wesley College	The Women's College

=== University of Tasmania ===
Christ College	Jane Franklin Hall	St. John Fisher College

== Canada ==
St. Michael's College	Trinity College

== Ireland ==
=== University of Dublin ===
University Sporting Pink	Trinity College	Trinity College Dublin Association and Trust (Alumni)
Dublin University Boat Club	Dublin University Bicycle Club	Dublin University Cricket Club
Dublin University Croquet Club (incorrect)	Dublin University Equestrian Club	Dublin University Football Club (Rugby Union)
Dublin University Hockey Club	Dublin University Ladies' Boat Club	Dublin University Lawn Tennis Club
Dublin University Rifle Club	Dublin University Swimming Club	Central Societies Committee
University Biological Association ('The Bi') (Medical)	University Philosophical Society ('The Phil')	University of Dublin Choral Society
Dublin University Geographical Society	Dublin University Speech and Language Pathology Society	Dublin University Physiotherapy Society
Dublin University History Society	Dublin University Engineering Society	Dublin University Law Society
Dublin University Pharmaceutical Society	College Theological Society ('The Theo') (incorrect)	College Historical Society ('The Hist') (incorrect)

=== National University of Ireland ===
==== University College Dublin ====
University College Dublin
University College Dublin, Colours
Sailing and Swimming Clubs	Rugby Club	Boat Club
Agricultural Science	Arts	Chemical Engineering
Civil and Environmental Engineering	Commerce	Electronic, Electrical, or Mechanical Engineering
Law	Medicine	Radiography
Science	Social Science	Veterinary Medicine

==== Other NUI Constituent Universities ====
Maynooth University	University of Galway	University College Cork

=== University of Limerick ===
University of Limerick

=== Dublin City University ===
Dublin City University

== New Zealand ==
=== University of Otago ===
Arana College	Aquinas College	Cumberland College
Knox College	Salmond College	Selwyn College
St Margaret's College

The term scarfies is often used in and around Dunedin, the site of the University of Otago, as a slang term for university students.

== United Kingdom ==
=== University of Birmingham ===
	University of Birmingham
College of Arts and Law	College of Social Sciences	College of Life and Environmental Sciences
College of Engineering and Physical Sciences	College of Medical and Dental Sciences	Faculty of Science

=== University of Bristol ===
Arts	Engineering	Law
Medicine	Sciences	Social sciences
Union

=== University of Cambridge ===
University of Cambridge ^{[b]}
	Scarf colours: three equal stripes of Cambridge blue and navy, with navy in the middle on one side of the scarf, and Cambridge blue in the middle on the other
Christ's College	Churchill College	Clare College
Scarf colours: brown, with two equally-spaced narrow white stripes	Scarf colours: black, with two equally-spaced narrow stripes of brown edged with pink	Scarf colours: black, with two equally-spaced narrow yellow stripes
Clare Hall	Corpus Christi College	Darwin College
Scarf colours: black, with two equally-spaced narrow stripes of red edged with yellow	Scarf colours: cherry pink, with two equally-spaced narrow white stripes	Scarf colours: blue, with two equally-spaced narrow sets of three adjacent red, Cambridge blue and yellow stripes, with the red stripes closest to the edge of the scarf, and the yellow stripes closest to the centre
Downing College	Emmanuel College	Fitzwilliam College
Scarf colours: black, with three narrow magenta stripes	Scarf colours: navy, with two equally-spaced narrow rose pink stripes	Scarf colours: maroon, with two equally-spaced narrow grey stripes
Girton College	Gonville and Caius College	Homerton College
Scarf colours: green, with two equally-spaced narrow stripes of red edged with white	Scarf colours: four equal stripes alternating black and Cambridge blue	Scarf colours: navy, with two equally-spaced narrow white stripes
Hughes Hall	Jesus College	King's College
Scarf colours: light blue with three equally-spaced narrow stripes, the outer stripes of Cambridge blue and wider, the central stripe of white and narrower	Scarf colours: three equal stripes of red and black, with red in the middle on one side of the scarf, and black in the middle on the other	Scarf colours: royal purple, with two equally-spaced narrow white stripes
Lucy Cavendish College	Magdalene College	Murray Edwards College
Scarf colours: eight alternating stripes of black and blue of varying width, with wide black and narrow blue stripes transitioning towards narrow black and wide blue stripes across the face of the scarf	Scarf colours: navy, with two equally-spaced narrow lavender stripes	Scarf colours: three equally-spaced narrow stripes separating two black areas towards the edge and two blue areas in the middle, the outer stripes of yellow and the central stripe of red
Newnham College	Pembroke College	Peterhouse
Scarf colours: grey, with a central broad band of navy, itself divided in two by a narrow gold stripe	Scarf colours: dark blue, with two equally-spaced narrow Cambridge blue stripes	Scarf colours: four equal stripes alternating white and blue
Queens' College	Robinson College	St Catharine's College
Scarf colours: dark green, with two equally-spaced narrow white stripes	Scarf colours: from one edge of the scarf to the other, the first third grey, then three equal stripes of blue, gold and grey, and then the final third blue	Scarf colours: burgundy, with narrow pearl pink stripes
St Edmund's College	St John's College	Selwyn College
Scarf colours: blue, with two equally-spaced narrow stripes of Cambridge blue edged with white	Scarf colours: navy, with two equally-spaced narrow stripes of Cambridge blue edged with red	Scarf colours: maroon, with three narrow gold stripes through the middle, the central stripe slightly narrower than others
Sidney Sussex College	Trinity College	Trinity Hall
Scarf colours: two equal halves of dark-red and navy	Scarf colours: navy, with three equally-spaced narrow stripes, the outer stripes of yellow and slightly narrower, the central stripe of red and slightly wider	Scarf colours: black, with two equally-spaced narrow white stripes
Wolfson College	Postdocs of Cambridge (PdOC)
Scarf colours: red, with two equally-spaced narrow golden stripes edged with white	Scarf colours: five equal stripes of Cambridge blue, royal purple, white, royal purple again, and Cambridge blue again

==== Sports colours ====
Full Blue	Half Blue	Roos
Tadpoles	Riding team	Rifle team
Hawks' Club	CUTwC	CU Bowmen
CURPC	CUGCR

=== Durham University ===
Durham University	Full Palatinate	Half Palatinate
Collingwood College	Cranmer Hall	Grey College
Hatfield College	John Snow College	St Aidan's College
St Chad's College	St Cuthbert's Society	College of St Hild and St Bede
St John's College	St Mary's College	Trevelyan College
University College	Van Mildert College	Durham Law School
Stephenson College

=== University of Glasgow ===
University of Glasgow
Arts	Dentistry	Divinity
Engineering	Law	Medicine
Nursing	Science	Social Sciences
Veterinary Medicine

=== Imperial College London ===
Imperial College London
Royal College of Science	City & Guilds College	Royal School of Mines
	Imperial College School of Medicine

=== Lancaster University ===
Lancaster University
The County College	Pendle College	Fylde College
Lonsdale College	Bowland College	Grizedale College
Furness College	Cartmel College	Graduate College

=== University of London ===
University of London
Birkbeck, University of London	King's College London	Guy's Hospital Medical School
St Thomas' Hospital Medical School	London Business School	London School of Economics
Queen Mary University of London	Royal Holloway, University of London	Royal Veterinary College
University College London	University College Hospital Medical School	Goldsmiths, University of London
Barts and The London School of Medicine and Dentistry	School of Oriental and African Studies	Heythrop College

=== University of Manchester ===
University of Manchester
Manchester School of Architecture	Hulme Hall	St. Anselm Hall

==== Victoria University of Manchester and UMIST (former) ====
Victoria University of Manchester	UMIST

=== Newcastle University ===
Newcastle University
Faculty of Humanities and Social Sciences (HASS)	Newcastle University Medical School	Faculty of Science, Agriculture and Engineering (SAGE)

=== University of Oxford ===
All Souls College	Balliol College	Blackfriars	Brasenose College
	Scarf colours: navy, with two equally spaced triple-stripes of white, purple and white again		Scarf colours: black, with two narrow yellow stripes a fifth of a scarf-width in from either edge
	Campion Hall	Christ Church	Corpus Christi College
		Scarf colours: navy, with two sets of narrow triple stripes a quarter scarf-width in from either edge, each set of triple stripes of red, white and brown from left to right	Scarf colours: five equal stripes alternating navy and dark red, with navy at the edges and in the centre
	Exeter College	Green Templeton College	Harris Manchester College
	Scarf colours: black, with two purple stripes each a quarter of the scarf wide, separated from one another by a central black area itself a quarter of the scarf wide	Scarf colours: navy, with a wide central stripe of green, and a narrow yellow stripe through each of the navy areas to either side	Scarf colours: navy, with a wide central stripe of red, and a narrow yellow stripe through each of the navy areas to either side
	Hertford College	Jesus College	Keble College
	Scarf colours: burgundy, with two narrow stripes of red lined with white a quarter scarf in from either edge	Scarf colours: green, with a central narrow white stripe, and two slightly thinner white stripes one fifth of a scarf-width in from either edge.	Scarf colours: navy, with two red stripes a fifth of a scarf-width in from either edge, each stripe divided by a white pinstripe
	Kellogg College	Lady Margaret Hall	Linacre College
	Scarf colours: navy, with two equally-spaced stripes of medium-blue edged with white	Scarf colours: navy, with two equally-spaced stripes of yellow, each edged with a thinner stripe of white on the left-hand side only	Scarf colours: two equally-spaced thin yellow stripes separating the outer two-thirds of black and the central third of grey
	Lincoln College	Magdalen College	Mansfield College
	Scarf colours: dark blue, with two pairs of sky-blue tramline stripes one quarter of a scarf-width in from either edge	Scarf colours: black, with two equally-spaced wide bands of white	Scarf colours: navy, with two equally-spaced pairs of thin tramline stripes, the left pinstripes in each pair of yellow and the right of red
	Merton College	New College	Nuffield College
	Scarf colours: purple, with two narrow white stripes a quarter of a scarf-width in from either edge	Scarf colours: brown, with two equally-spaced narrow white stripes	Scarf colours: black, with two equally-spaced stripes of dark-red edged with yellow
	Oriel College	Reuben College	Pembroke College
	Scarf colours: dark blue, with two equally-spaced pairs of narrow white tramlines		Scarf colours: navy, with two equally-spaced stripes of grey edged with pearl-pink
	The Queen's College	Regent's Park College	St Anne's College
	Scarf colours: navy, with a wide band of white through the centre, and a white pinstripe through each of the two remaining navy areas		Scarf colours: navy, with two equally-spaced stripes of red edged with grey
	St Antony's College	St Benet's Hall	St Catherine's College
	Scarf colours: navy, with two equally-spaced wide bands of yellow, and a thin red stripe through each yellow band		Scarf colours: maroon, with two equally-spaced narrow stripes of purple edged with sky-blue
	St Cross College	St Edmund Hall	St Hilda's College
	Scarf colours: navy, with two narrow double-stripes a quarter of a scarf-width in from either edge, the left of each double-stripe of white and the right of purple	Scarf colours: maroon, with two equally-spaced mustard pinstripes	Scarf colours: navy, with three equally-spaced stripes of white
	St Hugh's College	St John's College	St Peter's College
	Scarf colours: Two narrow double-stripes a fifth of a scarf-width in from either edge, the left of each double-stripe of white and the right of yellow, with the background areas to the left of each double-stripe of blue, and to the right of black, such that a black and a blue area meet in the centre of the scarf.	Scarf colours: black, with three equally-spaced thin stripes, the central stripe of red and the outer stripes of yellow	Scarf colours: green, with two narrow yellow stripes a quarter of a scarf-width in from either edge
	St Stephen's House	Somerville College	Trinity College
		Scarf colours: red, with two equally-spaced narrow black stripes	Scarf colours: navy, with two narrow white stripes a quarter of a scarf-width in from either edge
	University College	Wadham College	Wolfson College
	Scarf colours: navy, with two narrow yellow stripes a quarter of a scarf-width in from either edge	Scarf colours: black, with two grey-blue stripes a quarter of a scarf-width in from either edge, each stripe edged with a yellow pinstripe on the right-hand side only	Scarf colours: navy, with two equally-spaced stripes of red edged with yellow
	Worcester College	Wycliffe Hall
	Scarf colours: black, with two equally-spaced pearl-pink stripes

==== Sports colours ====
Full Blue	Half Blue	Vincent's Club

=== Queen's University Belfast ===
Queen's University Belfast
Graduate	University colours	Queen's University Belfast Boat Club
Faculty of Engineering and Physical Sciences	School of Law	School of Medicine and Dentistry

=== University of St Andrews ===
University of St Andrews
St Mary's College	Bute Medical School	The United College (Graduate)
St Leonard's College (Postgraduate)

=== University of Wales ===
University of Wales
Aberystwyth University	Bangor University
University of Wales, Newport	Cardiff Metropolitan University	Swansea University

=== University of York ===
University of York
Alcuin College	Constantine College	Derwent College
Goodricke College	Goodricke College (old)	Halifax College
James College	Langwith College	Vanbrugh College
Wentworth College

=== Scarf colours of other UK universities ===
University of the Arts London	Aston University	University of Bradford
Cardiff University	Cranfield University	University of Central Lancashire
University of Dundee	University of East Anglia	University of Edinburgh
University of Exeter	University of Greenwich	University of Hertfordshire
University of Hull	University of Kent	University of Leeds
University of Leicester	University of Liverpool	Liverpool Hope University
Loughborough University	Manchester Metropolitan University	University of Nottingham
Open University	University of Plymouth	University of Reading
Richmond University	University of Salford	University of Sheffield
Sheffield Hallam University	University of Warwick	University of Westminster

== United States ==
=== Harvard University ===
Harvard University
Adams House	Cabot House	Currier House
Dunster House	Dudley House	Eliot House
Kirkland House	Leverett House	Lowell House
Mather House	Pforzheimer House	Quincy House
Winthrop House

=== Yale University ===
Yale University^{[a]}
School of Art^{[a]}	Graduate School of Arts and Sciences^{[a]}	School of Nursing^{[a]}
School of Drama^{[a]}	Divinity School^{[a]}	Berkeley College^{[a]}
Branford College	Hopper College^{[a]}	Davenport College^{[a]}
Ezra Stiles College^{[a]}	Jonathan Edwards College^{[a]}	Pierson College^{[a]}
Silliman College^{[a]}	Timothy Dwight College^{[a]}	Trumbull College^{[a]}
	Morse College

=== Academic scarves of other American universities ===
Bates College	Brown University	Cornell University
Colby College	Colgate University	The College of William and Mary
Columbia University	Dartmouth College	MIT
Northwestern University	Pratt Institute	Princeton University
Sweet Briar College	State University of New York at Buffalo	University of California (all campuses)
University of Pennsylvania	Vassar College	Wesleyan University
University of Maryland (not a college scarf by the definition of the introduction)	University of Illinois	Williams College
‍‍‍‍‍‍‍
	University of Chicago

=== Scarf colors of US High Schools ===
Phillips Academy

== See also ==
- List of rowing blades – School and university
- University rowing in the United Kingdom
