= List of rowing blades used by schools and universities =

List of school and university rowing blades

This is a list of rowing blades used by schools and universities. The blade refers to the portion of an oar that enters the water and provides the bulk of propulsion. The designs are typically not trademarked, although some institutions may assert design rights to prevent imitation. As with other academic sports teams the blades used tend to draw as their inspiration heraldry of their academic institutions. On rare occasions, a colour difference between the blades of male and female rowing teams is found in academic settings, as in the case of Worcester College, Oxford.

== Asia ==
Blade	Club	Description
	The University of Hong Kong Rowing Club	Green and White

== Australia ==
Blade	Club	Description
	Adelaide University Boat Club	Black blade
	Brighton Grammar School	Red/Maroon blade
	Carey Baptist Grammar School	White blades with two black strips separated by a gold/yellow stripe
	Caulfield Grammar School	Deep blue oars with two white strips
	The Geelong College	Dark green oars with a white end band
	Geelong Grammar School	Eton blue
	Firbank Grammar School	White oar with green and gold stripes
	Haileybury	Dark purple oars
	Loreto Normanhurst	Gold, white and blue
	Melbourne Grammar School	Deep blue oars
	Melbourne High School	White oars with the school logo
	Prince Alfred College	Maroon blade
	St Peter's College Boat Club	Royal blue blades with two white stripes
	St Catherine's School, Toorak	White oar with a black strip and light blue end band
	St Kevin's College	Dark green oars with gold/yellow end bands
	Scotch College	Red blades with a blue strip and gold/yellow end band
	Wesley College	Purple oars with yellow/gold end bands
	Xavier College	White oars with red and black stripes

== Canada ==
Blade	Club	Description
	McGill University	McGill Red and White - Red with two white triangles on the edge forming a sideways 'M'
	Queen's University at Kingston	The Queen's Tricolour - Blue, gold, and red
	University of Montreal	University of Montreal Blue - Blue and white

== England ==
For blade colours of universities and university colleges, see university rowing.

Blade	Club	Description
	Abingdon School Boat Club	Cerise with a white tip
	Bedford Girls' School Rowing Club	Purple with 1 blue and 2 white stripes
	Bedford School Boat Club	Royal blue with two vertical white stripes
	Bedford Modern School Boat Club	Black with two vertical red stripes
	Bradford Grammar School Boat Club	Diagonally split blade of white and maroon
	Canford School Boat Club	Light blue
	Claires Court School Boat Club	White with gold and green diagonal stripe
	Dulwich College Boat Club	Sky blue and black separated by a white chevron
	Durham School Boat Club	White with the Cross of St Cuthbert and green edging
	Emanuel School Boat Club	Dark blue with a yellow chevron
	Eton College Boat Club	Eton blue
	Grange School Rowing Club	Green, white and black diagonals
	Great Marlow School Boat Club	Black with red triangle
	Hampton School Boat Club	Yellow with black on the reverse
	Headington School Oxford Boat Club	White with light blue tip
	King's College School Boat Club	Blue with Red tips
	Kingston Grammar School Boat Club	Red with a thick white stripe
	The King's School Canterbury Boat Club	White with navy chevrons
	The King's School Chester Rowing Club	White blades with thin green and blue chevrons. The stripes on the reverse of the blade are vertical
	King's Ely Boat Club	light blue with 5 navy squares
	The King's School Worcester Boat Club	White blades
	Lady Eleanor Holles School Boat Club	White with a red triangle
	Latymer Upper School Boat Club	Light blue
	London Oratory School Boat Club	Black on reverse
	Monkton Combe School Boat Club	White fleur-de-lis on the school blue
	Norwich School Boat Club	Blue with yellow and red stripes
	Oratory School Boat Club	Grey with college colours
	Pangbourne College Boat Club	White with college colours
	Queen Elizabeth High School Rowing Club	White with green diagonal
	Radley College Boat Club	Red and white
	Reading Blue Coat School Boat Club	White with 2 blue & 1 yellow stripe
	Royal Grammar School High Wycombe Boat Club	White with two green, red and blue stripes either side
	Royal Grammar School Worcester Boat Club	Dark blue with yellow crown
	Royal Shrewsbury School Boat Club	Dark blue with the Maltese Cross
	St Edward's School Boat Club	Cornflower blue with a gold chevron
	St Leonard's School Boat Club Durham	White with two green chevrons
	St George's College Boat Club	Red with a white triangle
	St Paul's School Boat Club	White with black tip and loom continuation - black with white tip on reverse
	St Peter's School Boat Club	White with a brown stripe
	Shiplake College Boat Club	Black, red split by yellow diagonal
	Sir William Borlase's Grammar School Boat Club	Dark blue with single red chevron
	Tiffin School Boat Club	Blue with two red vertical stripes
	Westminster School Boat Club	Pink Blades
	Winchester College Boat Club	Dark blue with a dark red chevron
	Windsor Boys' School Boat Club	Green and yellow halves
	Wycliffe College Boat Club	Dark purple with light purple chevron

== Ireland ==
Blade	Club	Description
	Dublin University Boat Club	White with three black chevrons
	Dublin University Ladies Boat Club	White with three chevrons of black, pink and black

== Netherlands ==
Blade	Club	Description
	G.S.R. Aegir, Groningen	White with a red star
	HSRV Amphitrite, Haarlem	
	W.S.R. Argo, Wageningen	White with 2 green bands
	Asopos de Vliet, Leiden	Red and purple divided by a diagonal white stripe
	D.R.V. Euros, Enschede	White with red chevron
	A.G.S.R. Gyas, Groningen	
	D.S.R.V Laga, Delft	Red
	A.S.R. Nereus, Amsterdam	Maroon with 2 white bands
	K.S.R.V. Njord, Leiden	White with aqua band
	R.S.V.U. Okeanos, Amsterdam	White with green and red stripes
	Orca Rowing Club (A.U.S.R. ORCA), Utrecht	Gray with red band
	H.S.R.V. Pelargos, The Hague	Dark blue with orange
	N.S.R.V. Phocas, Nijmegen	Yellow
	DSR Proteus-Eretes, Delft	White with orange band
	M.S.R.V. Saurus, Maastricht	Red with white star
	Skadi Rowing Club (ARSR Skadi), Rotterdam	
	A.A.S.R. Skøll, Amsterdam	Red and white
	E.S.R. Thêta, Eindhoven	White with orange and brown stripes at the tip
	U.S.R. Triton, Utrecht	Dark blue with a white stripe
	T.S.R. Vidar, Tilburg	Grey and bordeaux

== New Zealand ==
Blade	Club	Description
	Otago University Rowing Club	Eton blue

== Scotland ==
For blade colours of universities and university colleges, see university rowing.

Blade	Club	Description
	Aberdeen Schools Rowing Association (ASRA)	White with 3 black chevrons
	George Heriots School Rowing Club	White
	George Watsons College Rowing Club	White with maroon tip
	Glasgow Academy Boat Club	White with crest
	Glasgow Schools Rowing Club	White with crest

== South Africa ==
Blade	Club	Description
	University of Kwazulu-Natal Boat Club	Segmented white, blue and green.

== United States ==
Blade	Club	Description
Bates College	Bates College	Maroon with diagonal black band and white tip
Bowdoin College	Bowdoin College	White and black check pattern
	Brown University Men's Rowing	White with diagonally-cut brown top
Colby College	Colby College	Split blade of white and blue with gray chevron
	Columbia University	Diagonally-split blade of Columbia blue and white
	Catholic University Rowing	Red with white cross
	Colgate University Rowing Club	Maroon with two diagonal white bands
	Cornell University Boat Club	White blade with red tip
	Dartmouth College Boat Club	Green with diagonal white tip
	Duke University Men's Crew	Blue with White Chevron
	Georgetown University Boat Club	Cadet gray with Prussian blue chevron
	Harvard University Men's Crew	Crimson and white
	Harvard University (formerly Radcliffe College) Women's Crew	Black and white
	Harvard Kennedy School	Alternating red and white stripes like the school's shield and the American flag
	Illini Rowing, University of Illinois	Orange with navy blue block I.
	Lewis & Clark College	Black blade with orange chevron.
	Marist University, Red Foxes Crew	White blade with red chevron.
	Massachusetts Institute of Technology	Red "Tech" letter T. The T is vertical for heavyweights, and horizontal for lightweights (as seen).
	University of Michigan Men's Rowing Team	Blue blade with yellow chevron.
	Pacific Lutheran University	Bisected yellow and white blade with black chevron
	College Boat Club, University of Pennsylvania	Red and blue
	Princeton University	Split blade of orange and black
	Rochester Institute of Technology	Black blade with orange chevron and white trim
	Syracuse University Boat Club	Syracuse orange with navy chevron
	University of California	Blue with gold chevron
	University of Kansas Crew	Crimson and Blue
	University of Nebraska-Lincoln	Red
	University of Southern California	Golden yellow with two cardinal chevrons
	University of Washington	White
	Washington College	White with two vertical maroon stripes
	Washington and Lee University	White blade with a navy blue corner
	Wheaton College (Illinois)	Navy blade with orange cross
	Willamette University	Cardinal blade with gold at the tip
	Williams College	Blade of purple with gold stripes on white
	Wisconsin Badgers Crew, University of Wisconsin–Madison	Red
	Yale University	Split blade of Yale Blue and white

== Wales ==
Blade	Club	Description
	Monmouth School	Brown with gold blaze
	Monmouth School for Girls Rowing Club	Red and white quarters with blue blaze

== See also ==
- Academic scarf
