= DUBC =

DUBC is an acronym that may refer to:

- Darjah Utama Bakti Cemerlang, the Singapore Distinguished Service Order uses the post-nominal letters DUBC
- Dublin University Boat Club the rowing club of Dublin University, Ireland
- Durham University Boat Club the rowing club of Durham University, England
- WC (rapper), pronounced Dub-C
