= University of New South Wales Revues =

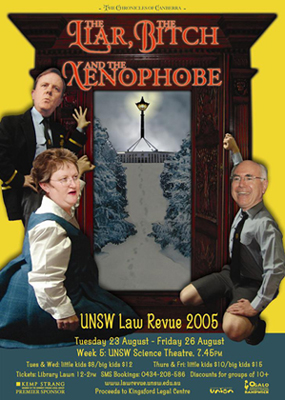
Poster for UNSW Law Revue's 2005 show, The Chronicles of Canberra: The Liar, The Bitch & The Xenophobe.

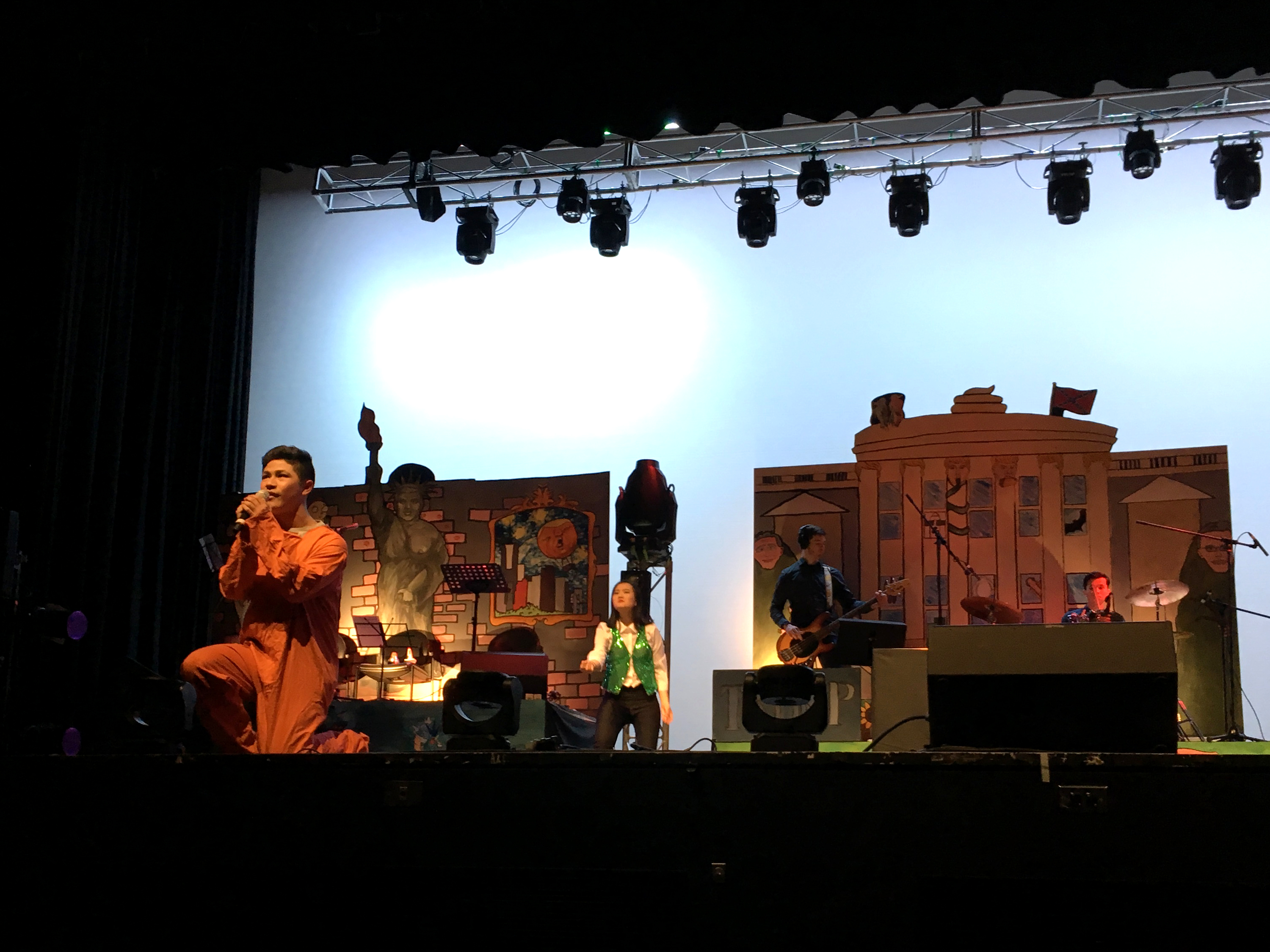
Isaac Dela Torre performing at the 2017 Law Revue show, Lady and the Trump.

Students produce a number of comedy revues at the University of New South Wales in Sydney, Australia each year. Written and performed by students, the shows comment satirically on current affairs, pop culture, dating and university life. They feature song parodies, short sketches, video segments and dance numbers. The first revue at the university, entitled Low Notes, was organised by the Students' Union in 1956. The first revue by the UNSW Medical Society Revue, held in 1975, was entitled Rumpleforeskin and was quickly followed by the UNSW Law Revue Society's The Assault and Battery Operated Show.

Shows are typically named with a pun on a then-current pop culture reference: usually a movie but computer games, political slogans, television shows and books have also featured.

Since 1975, revues from the Law, Built Environment and Arts faculties, the School of Computer Science, and the university's Jewish community, have all been held. Notably, the UNSW Law Revue Society's 2020 and the Terrible, Horrible, No Good, Very Bad Law and Justice Revue was the first video revue and the only revue to be held in 2020 due to disruption caused by the COVID-19 pandemic.

Operationally, each of the three largest revues (Med, Law and CSE) is a club affiliated to UNSW Arc and subject to the latter's oversight. Revues retain their institutional memory through 'old revuers', participants who come back year after year. Former directors are often invited back to perform voice-overs and critique shows before they go to stage.

== Past shows ==
=== Medical Revue ===
UNSW Medical Revues
1975	Rumpleforeskin	1976	Pandemonia, or Thanks for the Mammary!	1977	It's Epidemic!	1978	Gross Encounters of the Turd Kind	1979	The Sound of Mucus	1980	My Brilliant Diahorrea
1981	A Wet Summer Night's Dream	1982	Merry Maladies: What's up Doc?	1983	ET: The Extra Testicle	1984	Doctopussy	1985	All Crotches Great & Small	1986	Twilight Moan
1987	Dark Side Of The Toast	1988	Gastro Boy	1989	The Satanic Nurses	1990	Zen Cabbage	1991	Presumed Impotent	1992	Herniator 2
1993	Missing In Traction	1994	All the President's Phlegm	1995	The Symptoms	1996	Glitter	1997	12 Junkies	1998	South Cark
1999	Pre-Millennium Tension	2000	American Booty	2001	Medicator	2002	Stool Wards Episode Poo: Attack Of The Colons	2003	8 Inch	2004	The Cat With The Fat
2005	Mary's Poppin	2006	Thrush Hour	2007	Kill Bulk Bill	2008	Happy Foetus	2009	Pirates of Cardiology: Dead Man's Chest	2010	Procrastinator Infection
2011	Surgery Street	2012	PokéMed: Gotta Cure Ém All	2013	Cirque du Surgery	2014	Peter Pandemic	2015	Super Cardio Bros	2016	Doctor Flu
2017	Booty and the Beast	2018	The Incredipills	2019	The Golden Probe Awards	2021	Breaking Bones	2022	Alice in Rabidland	2023	The Medic of Oz

=== Law Revue ===
UNSW Law Revues
1976	The Assault and Battery Operated Show	1977	As Crime Goes Bi	1978	Don't Give me the Writz	1979	Justice You Like It	1980	Evicta: featuring "Don't Lie for me on Subpoena"	1981	A Penny for your Torts
1982	If They Could Sue Me Now	1983	Commission Impossible	1984	Rebel without a Clause	1985	Gone With the Briese	1986	The Good, The Bad and The Unsworth	1987	Police State Your Business or Rollover Trimbole
1988	Witless for the Prosecution	1989	Simply Inadmissible	1990	Sex, Bribes and Magistrates	1991	QC Hammer: U Can't Judge This!	1992	Republic Enemy	1993	Juristic Perk
1994	Faheywatch	1995	Bombe Perignon	1996	Coalition: Impossible	1997	So Sue Me Street	1998	Godzillaw	1999	The Last Judgment
2000	Bored of the Rings	2001	Dude, Where's Bob Carr?	2002	Illegally Bombed featuring Detention Island	2003	Midget John's Diary	2004	Iraqi Horror Picture Show	2005	The Chronicles of Canberra: The Liar, The Bitch & The Xenophobe
2006	Hostile Powers: International Plan for Misery	2007	Poll Fiction	2008	Bar Wars Episode QC: Revenge of the Silks	2009	Harried Prosecutor and the Prisoner in Afghanistan	2010	Abbott In Blunderland	2011	Law Story
2012	The Lying King	2013	Lexis Case Law Massacre	2014	The Abbott: The Desolation of Aus	2015	The Blunder Games: Catching Liars	2016	21 Judge Street	2017	Lady and the Trump
2018	The Bachelawyer	2019	Chilling Adventures of Subpoena	2020	2020 & The Terrible, Horrible, No Good, Very Bad, Law & Justice Revue	2022	No Crime to Lie	2023	Barbie: Life in the Jailhouse	2024	Kung Fu Memoranda

=== CSE (Computer Science and Engineering) Revue ===
UNSW CSE (Computer Science & Engineering) Revues
2002	Minority Revue	2003	Revue Reloaded	2004	Star Key and Hash	2005	Sin CSE	2006	The teXt Files: Close Encounters of the Nerd Kind	2007	Sand Theft Auto: Agrabah City
2008	CSE++ // Revue goes large	2009	Gossip Geek	2010	Pacman: The Dark Byte	2011	Hack to the Future	2012	Codebusters	2013	The Infringers
2014	Game of Codes	2015	The Lego Revue	2016	ST*R WARS: The Source Awakens	2017	Avatar: The Last MacBook Airbender	2018	Mycrosoft Shrexcel	2019	Aladdin: Arraybian bytes[]
2022	Pirates of the Blue Screen: Deadlocked Chest	2024	Mean gURLS	2025	ScriptBob SquareBrackets	2026	How To Train your PseudoSerpent (HTTPS)

=== AUJS Revue ===
AUJS Revues
1984	Broadway Funny Nose	1985	Katz	1986	The Challah Purple	1987	Little Shop of Schnorrers	1988	Three Men and a Bagel	1989	Licence to Spiel / 21 Flood St
1990	Teenage Mutant Ninja Rabbis	1991	Spartuchus	1992	Hook	1993	Miss Shugina	1994	Foreskins and a Funeral	1995	A Fish Called Gefillte
1996	Mishna Impossible	1997	Shema Wars	1998	The Full Montefiore	1999	Austin Payos - The Spy who Schtupped Me	2000	X-Mensch	2001	Revue Live: Off Broadway
2002	Debbie Does Double Bay	2003	8 Moyel	2006	Diaspora Housewives	2007	Harry Pottervich and the Order of the Seder	2011	The Lambshank Redemption	2012	Curb Your Judaism
2013	Jew Fast, Jew Furious	2014	Torah the Explorer	2015	Sabathday night fever	2016	Mad Max Brenner

=== Arts & Social Sciences Revue ===
An Arts & Social Sciences Revue was held in 2006, entitled It's Time. Arts Revue returned in 2013 and again in 2014, entitled 10 Things I Hate About Arts Revue

=== Engineering Revue ===
An engineering revue was held in 1991 entitled Gorillas On The Piss.

== Other shows ==
"Best of" revues typically combine selected material from previous shows, sometimes updated or adapted to take into account the intervening period of time. A "Best of" show, featuring material from both Med Revues and Law Revues from the years 1984–1989, was held in the Bondi Pavilion in 1990. The show was called A Fabulous Set of Steak Knives. A "Best of" called Heart Rate High: the Bex Years of Our Lives was held at the Figtree Theatre in 1996, but covered material from Med Revues only from 1990 to 1995. In 1998, a show was put on by revuers off-campus called Dead Fish are Fun, which featured some material from past Law and Med Revues, as well as original material. In 2001, a "Best of" show called Comedy for the Chemical Generation was held at the Figtree theatre covering material from Med Revues 1996–2000.

In 2006, Law & Orderlies, a "Best of" show covering both Med and Law Revue, was held at the Figtree Theatre. The bulk of material was drawn from Revues from 2000 to 2005, however the show also featured sketches from Med Revue 1975, Law Revue 1989, and Law Revue 1998.

In 2011, another "Best of" show was staged, again in the Fig Tree Theatre. The title of the show was "Deja Revue", and featured content mostly from 2006 - 2010 Med & Law Revues. The show had a 4 night run, and sold out every single seat for every single night, before the curtain had even opened on the first night.

In 2012, CSE Revue held their first "Best of" show, featuring the best sketches from the previous 10 shows.

Other revues at the university are held from time to time: students from New College, the Faculty of the Built Environment and the university's Buddhist club organise smaller-scale shows. Sketch comedy shows have also been hosted by the New South Wales University Theatrical Society (NUTS), the UNSW comedy club Studio Four, and other groups.

A medical-student-only production called UNSW Medshow (or sometimes Med Show) was established in 2000 by former Med Revuer Neil Jeyasingam, after the Med Revue stopped donating proceeds to charity, and due to the onerous rehearsal schedule that made it difficult for medical students to participate. Med Show has been held annually since.

== UNSW Revue alumni ==
- Andrew Dyer, cast member and writer for the Seven Network's Big Bite
- Tristan Jepson, cast member and writer for the Seven Network's Big Bite
- Andrew Jones, film and TV writer, and co-creator of Seven Network's Big Bite
- Rick Kalowski, film and TV writer; co-creator of Big Bite and Double Take
- The Hon. Justice Lucy McCallum, Chief Justice of the Australian Capital Territory and former judge of the Supreme Court of New South Wales
- Matthew "Aiyiah" Lee, co-host on ABC2's Good Game
- Garry Charny, film producer Jindabyne, and Guarding Charlie, Chairman April Films and Centuria Capital

== See also ==
Revues are also held at:

- Australian National University
- Macquarie University
- University of Sydney
