= Colombo House, University of New South Wales =

Residential college at the University of New South Wales

Colombo House
- University of New South Wales
- Location: UNSW campus, Kensington
- Full name: Colombo House
- Established: 2014
- Named for: The Colombo Plan
- Sister colleges: Basser College, Philip Baxter College, Goldstein College, Fig Tree Hall and UNSW Hall.
- Head: Isabelle Creagh
- Dean: Michael Patoka
- Website: https://accommodation.unsw.edu.au/colleges/colombo-house

Colombo House is a residential college at the University of New South Wales' Kensington campus. Colombo House admitted its first residents in 2014, following a redevelopment of the university's Kensington Colleges.

== History ==
Colombo House is named in honor of the University of New South Wales' involvement in the Colombo Plan, with the university having its first intake of Colombo Plan students in 1952. Born out of a Commonwealth Conference of Foreign Ministers, held in Colombo, Sri Lanka, in 1950, The Colombo Plan provided South East Asian students with opportunities to study at international universities in fields of study as yet unavailable to them in their home countries. Graduates of the Colombo Plan went on to be some of the region's top level political leaders and captains of industry, including Former Prime Minister of Nepal, Dr. Baburam Bhattarai and Singapore's current Minister for National Development Khaw Boon Wan.

A history of the Colombo Plan by Daniel Oakman, called Facing Asia: A History of the Colombo Plan is now available online.

== Intercollege Cup (ICC) ==
Colombo House won the first Intercollege Cup held between Fig Tree College, UNSW Hall and Colombo House in October 2014.

== Accommodation ==
Colombo House will cater for 242 students in single occupancy, dormitory style rooms, all with private en suites. The College will have expansive common and study areas as well as a rooftop garden with views across the Randwick Racecourse to the Sydney skyline. Landscaped garden spaces will be shared with Basser, Philip Baxter, Goldstein College and Fig Tree Hall.

Colombo House is a self-catered residence with communal kitchens on floors three to six, and a large catering size kitchen on the ground floor. Accommodation packages include free WIFI and electricity. There are also laundry facilities on the ground floor.
