= Goldstein College, University of New South Wales =

College in Sydney, Australia

Goldstein College
- University of New South Wales
- Location: UNSW campus, Kensington
- Full name: Goldstein College
- Established: 1964
- Named for: Phillip Godfrey Goldstein
- Sister colleges: Basser College; Philip Baxter College, Fig Tree Hall, Colombo House and UNSW Hall.
- Head: Isabelle Creagh
- Dean: Gillian Turner
- Website: The Kensington Colleges

Goldstein College, University of New South Wales is one of the three original Kensington Colleges along with Phillip Baxter and Basser College, located in Australia. In 2012 and 2013, Goldstein residents resided in Baxter College during the University of New South Wales (UNSW) major student accommodation redevelopment project.

== History ==
Goldstein College is the smallest of the three Kensington Colleges at the University of New South Wales. The newly completed Goldstein College building houses 150 residents. The residents of the college are of local, rural and international students.

The original Goldstein College was opened on 30 June 1964, along with the Goldstein Dining Hall which is shared by all residents of The Kensington Colleges. The college was designed by Government Architect, Ted Farmer, and a member of his staff, Peter Hall, who later succeeded Jørn Utzon as supervising architect of the Sydney Opera House. The Goldstein Dining Hall won the Sir John Sulman Medal for architecture in 1966.

Goldstein College was named after Phillip Godfrey Goldstein (1895—1963), who arrived in Australia in 1911 from England. In 1959 he donated £40,000 (Australian) towards the construction of the Dining Hall and College. The College initially housed women and postgraduate students, being the first college accommodation for women on the UNSW campus.

== House Committee ==
Goldstein College is governed by a student run House Committee under the supervision of the Dean of College.

== 2014 redevelopment ==
The redeveloped Goldstein College opened in Semester 1, 2014. It accommodates 150 students in a mixture of rooms with either en suites or shared bathroom facilities. The College shares landscaped garden spaces with Basser, Philip Baxter and the newly established residences; Fig Tree Hall and Colombo House. Residents are provided with three meals per day (during session) at the Goldstein Dining Hall, which is shared with the other Kensington Colleges; Basser, Philip Baxter and Fig Tree Hall. The Dining Hall has undergone a major refurbishment while retaining the design features and fixtures of the original interior.
