= Basser College, University of New South Wales =

Residential college at University of New South Wales

Basser College
- University of New South Wales
- Coordinates: 33.91655°S 151.23167°E
- Nickname: Wildcats
- Motto: Scientia
- Motto in English: Knowledge
- Established: 1959
- Named for: Sir Adolph Basser
- Colours
- Sister colleges: Philip Baxter College, Goldstein College, Fig Tree Hall, Colombo House and UNSW Hall
- Website: The Kensington Colleges

Basser College, University of New South Wales is a residential college at the University of New South Wales in Sydney. Basser College and its two neighbouring Colleges, Goldstein and Phillip Baxter, are collectively known as the Kensington Colleges.

== History ==
Basser College was founded in 1959, ten years after the opening of the University of New South Wales (UNSW), making it the oldest residential college at the university. It was built to accommodate students from rural areas, enabling them access to the same education as local, metropolitan students. The college is named after Sir Adolph Basser (1887–1965), a Polish entrepreneur and philanthropist who contributed significantly to the cost of the college's construction.

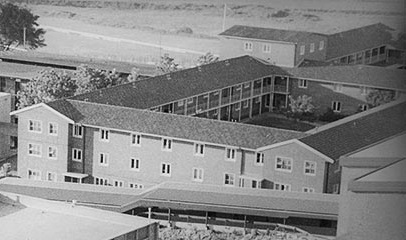
Basser College viewed from the top of the Civil Engineering Building, partly obscured by the Central Lecture Block and the Basser stairs; 1968

The college's foundational structure was designed around two central courtyards with a small one to the north, and a larger one to the south, with a balcony running around the inside of the alcoves. In the first few years, when the college was all male, the smaller quadrangle was known as the Senior Quad and the other, the Junior quad. When girls were first admitted in 1965, they occupied a section of the smaller quadrangle, hence the quads became known as the Girls' Quad and the Boys' Quad. The names echo the separate living arrangements in the college at that time; a practice which has since been discontinued.

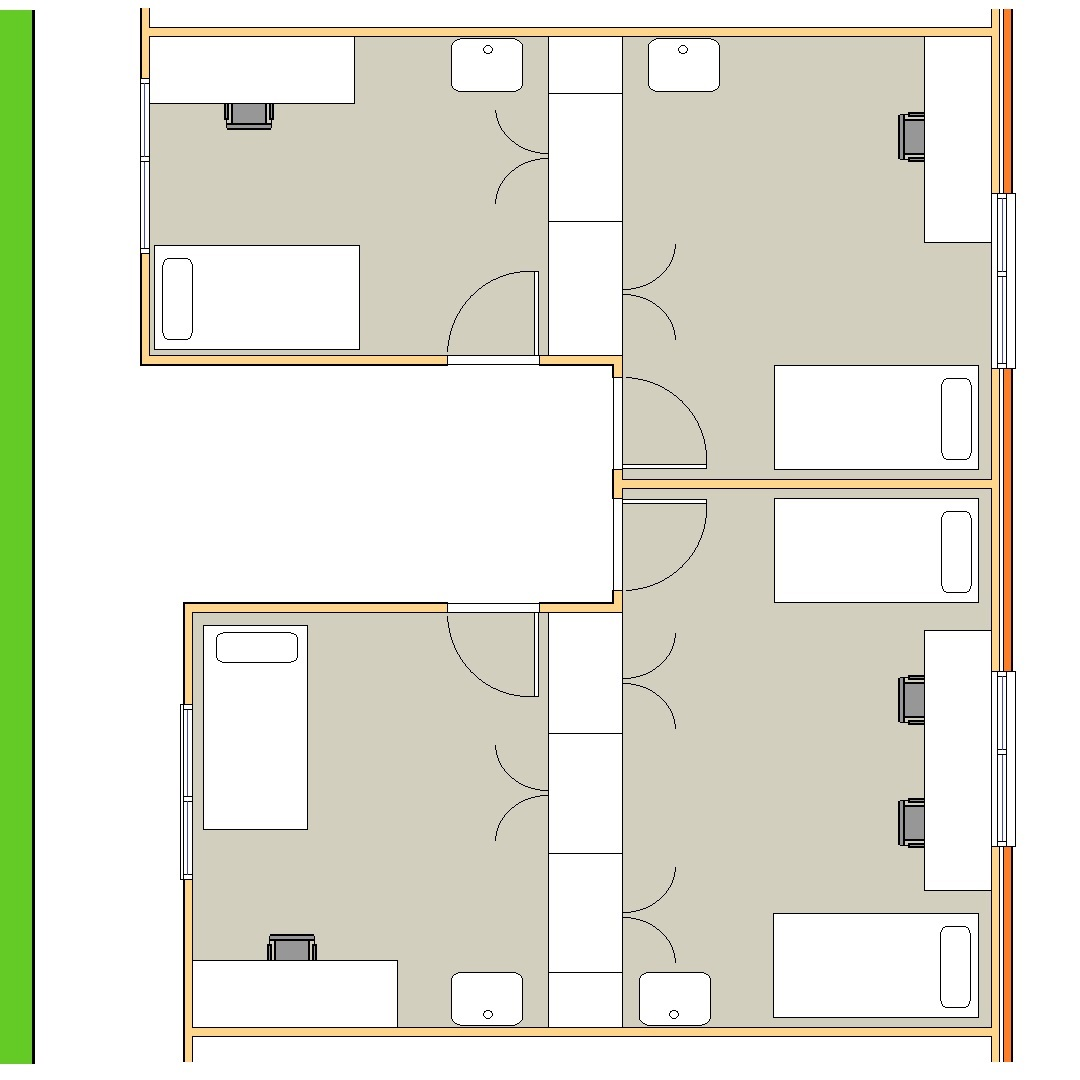
Sketch showing the balcony and the four rooms around an alcove off it.

The majority of the rooms were divided into alcoves of four rooms, with two inner rooms and two outer rooms. Originally the large outer rooms were occupied by two freshers and the smaller outer room would have a more senior student. The inner rooms were normally reserved for sophomores and seniors. Once the girls were distributed evenly throughout the whole college, these alcoves were thus affectionately dubbed 'alcove families', with two males and two females constituting each group.

The beds in Basser College were narrow (2 feet 6 inches, 762 mm wide) and had a very hard mattress.

Basser College's original building was the only college on the Kensington Campus in which every room had the convenience of a wash basin. But there was only one power-point. So if one wanted to have a heater or jug and some music, then it meant using a double adaptor/piggy-back plug or two, or a home-made patch board. Also there were no phones in the rooms. The secretary downstairs had a switch-board with 2 incoming lines. If there was a call for a student during office hours, then she would call their name on the PA system and transfer the call to one of the 2 phones that were adjacent to the stairs on level 1. At 5pm the secretary switched the incoming lines to the phones upstairs. A roster of freshers was organized. It was the duty of the nominated fresher to stay in the small common room adjacent to the phones and answer the phones and then fetch whichever student was required.

Residents generally stayed in Basser for two or three years before ending their college tenure. A student had to remain at College for two and a half years, to be named Honorary College Valedictorian.

Basser College celebrated its 50th anniversary with a 'Back to Basser' day at the college in August 2009. The original building was last used in the 2011 Academic year and was handed over to a construction company in December 2011 to be demolished and replaced as part of UNSW's major student accommodation redevelopment.

== Student life ==
Basser College offers a range of sporting, cultural and social activities planned and co-ordinated by a student leadership team. The leadership team, known as the 'House Committee,' consists of:

- The Social Director in charge of weekly events and parties.
- Male and Female Sports Directors, who organise Inter-College Sports Association competitions.
- The Cultural Director who facilitate the annual play, musical groups, exhibitions and excursions to cultural venues in Sydney.
- The Arc@UNSW and Communities Director, who co-ordinates and promotes charitable activities as well as functions as the chief external liaison to the UNSW Student Union and Alumni of Basser College.
- The Operations and Communications Director, who is charged with the dissemination of college information and maintenance of Student Club operated amenities.

Each individual Director is charged with the operation and management of a succinct portfolio of Officers of the House. Each Officer is appointed to complete a specific role within the college, i.e. the organisation of the annual Basser College Ball. In 2021, the Basser Ball will be organised by officers Emilie Hughes and Adam Coppel. Rumour has it that Basser Ball 2021 was one of the most extraordinary nights of the year. Despite COVID Restrictions, the two phenomenal organisational whizzes were able to build the hype and unleash onto the residents a true night of nights. T-30 Days. Get Keen.

The House Committee is in turn overseen and directed by the Basser student executive, consisting of a treasurer, secretary and president. The executive works with the dean of college to ensure that the rules of the college and the responsibilities of each resident are upheld and maintained respectively. The current dean of Basser College is Gillian Turner.

Basser College also hosts an annual 'Parent's Weekend' where parents are invited to experience the students' College activities.

Academic support is available to every resident in college by UNSW support staff. Senior college residents can also earn the title of 'Academic Mentor' on the basis of exemplary academic performance. Academic Mentors are charged with the responsibility of assisting their faculty peers.

Three meals per day are provided during session at the nearby Goldstein Dining Hall, which is shared with the other Kensington Colleges – Philip Baxter, Goldstein and Fig Tree Hall.

In the early years of the college, the rooms were cleaned and the beds were made every weekday by a team of older women, with each maid being given a section of the college to look after. Now accommodation packages include only fortnightly cleaning and WiFi.

Basser College promotes an "open door policy", where residents keep their door open during the day to promote comradery among students living there.

== Early traditions ==
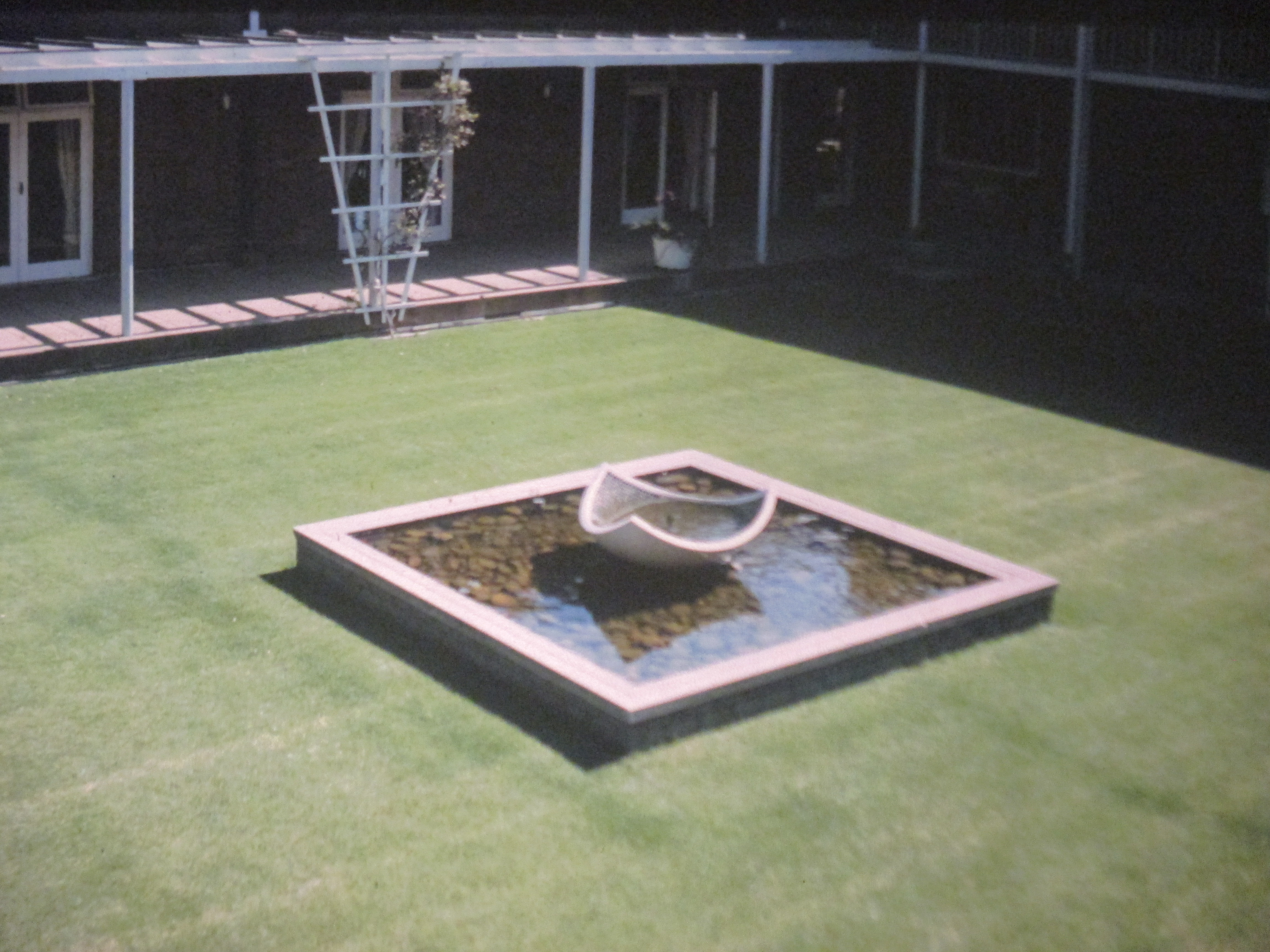
Basser College fountain in the smaller quadrangle, 1967

The freshers were requested to arrive in college at the start of orientation week, during which time they were required to wear a 300 mm-square (12 in) piece of cardboard on their chest. On it was written their name, room number and their course. This enabled every one to get to know each other.

There were numerous things organized during orientation week, including: a lecture about the College and the University; a fire drill; a tour of the college amenities ("Note; you must learn where the various room numbers are!!"); day trip to Audley in the Royal National Park or Clark Island; and a scavenger hunt around Sydney.

At the beginning of first term, the freshers were purchased by groups of sophomores/seniors at an auction. These freshers would then join their group for coffee/tea during the study-break between 10am to 11am each evening.

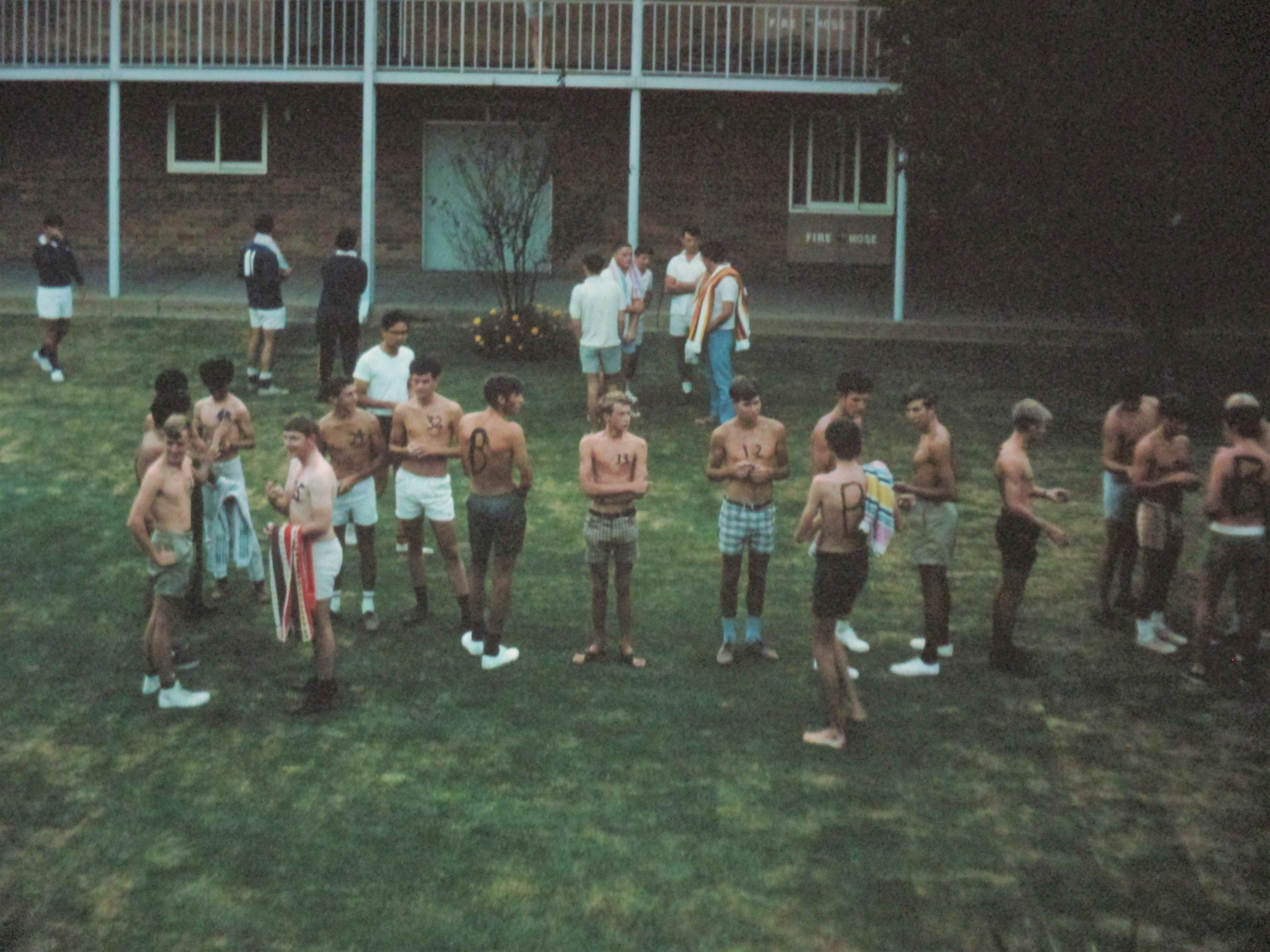
Basser College freshmen ready for the run to Coogee Beach, Sydney 1968

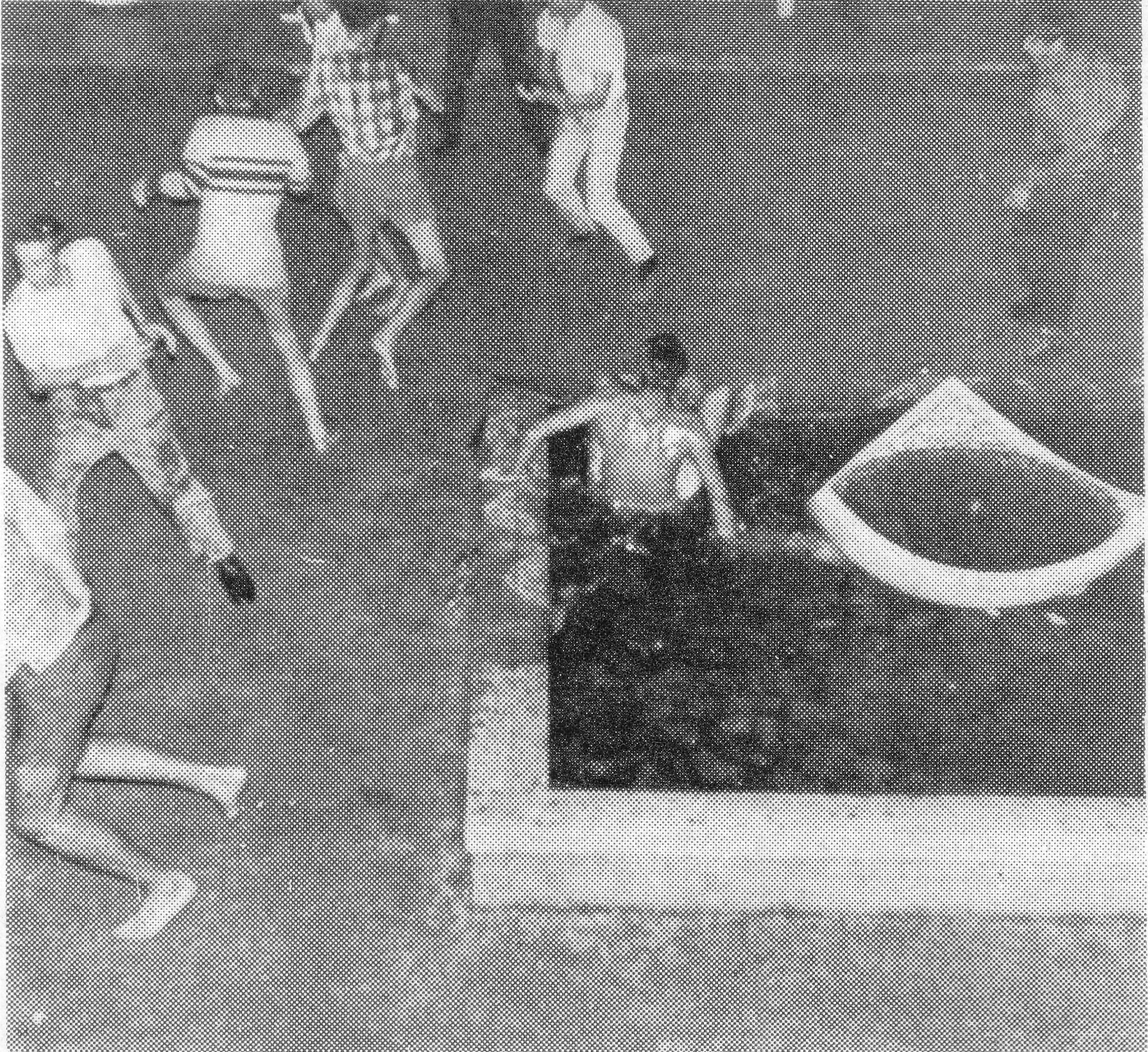
Dunking of a student into the fountain on his birthday, 4 July 1967

Early in first term, the freshmen were forced to run from the college to Coogee Beach. Note the big letter B in black shoe-polish on the back of the boys, and their number in polish on their chest. Based on their results in this run, they were given a handicap in a later cross-country run in Centennial Park.

Each year the freshers produced a concert for the entertainment of the whole college.

Originally there was a fountain in the smaller quadrangle. If you allowed your birthday to be known, then you could find yourself dumped into this fountain by your friends. The fountain was also used to dump the valedictorians after their farewell dinner.

== Redevelopment ==
The redeveloped Basser College opened in Semester 1, 2014, accommodating 160 students in a mixture of rooms with either en suite or shared bathroom facilities. The building includes common and study areas as well as a rooftop garden. The college shares landscaped garden spaces with the other two Kensington Colleges - Philip Baxter College and Goldstein College - and colleges established following the Kensington Colleges' redevelopment, Fig Tree Hall and Colombo House.
