= Otago University Rowing Club =

New Zealand rowing club

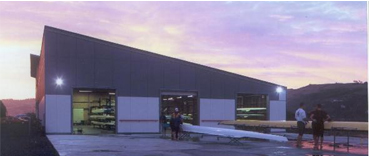

- Motto: Audeamus
- Motto in English: We will Dare
- Location: Dunedin, New Zealand
- Home water: Otago Harbour
- Founded: 16 April 1929
- Affiliations: Rowing New Zealand, Otago Rowing Association
- Website: www.ourc.org.nz

Events
- New Zealand National Rowing Championships New Zealand University Rowing Championships

Otago University Rowing Club is a rowing club affiliated with the University of Otago, New Zealand and was formed in 1929 to provide students of the university the opportunity to compete against other universities in New Zealand. This remains the main aim of the club, although limited membership is now available for persons not studying at the University of Otago.

== History ==
Otago University Rowing Club was established on 16 April 1929. The first President, Professor D W Carmalt Jones, continued until 1944. Carmalt Jones had rowed for Corpus Christi College, Oxford University, and captained the College Eight in 1898. He loved rowing and believed the combination of disciplined exercise and teamwork was invaluable to the developing young man. His sonnet, Summer Eights, celebrates rowing.

The Club started rowing from the Otago Rowing Club's Kitchener St shed, which in 2014 still stands. In 1931 the Club moved to the North End Boating Club which is on the Harbour-side a short walk from the University, and has since built a new location on the North End of Magnet St, purpose built through OUSA (Otago University Students Association) funding for sole use by university rowers. The Club colours, a Cambridge Blue singlet with a 4-inch gold band were adopted in 1931.

The Club had 60 members in the mid 1930s. The strong relationship with North End was seen in the joint membership of coaches, Glengarry, Eggers and Rennick. The first Club Eight, purchased in 1939, was named Carmalt Jones to honour the Club President. In this boat Otago won the Hebberley Shield, awarded to the winners of the New Zealand University Men's Open Eight on Easter Saturday 1939 on the Otago Harbour. At the Tournament Ball Carmalt Jones presented the Shield, the first time it had been competed for. The Hebberley Shield is now the most desired prize in New Zealand University Rowing.

== Notable members ==
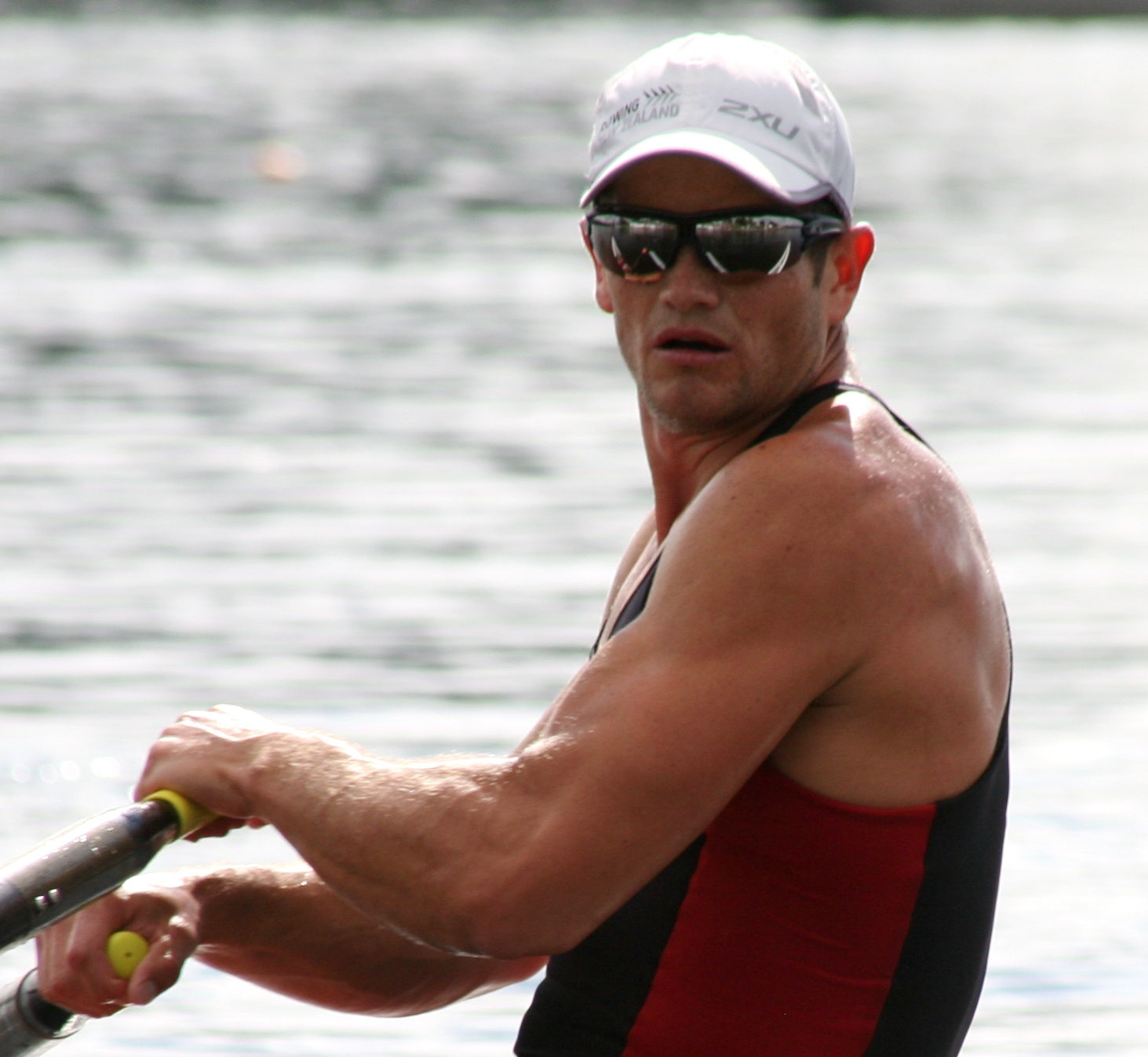
Nathan Cohen

Members of the Club represent New Zealand at many levels, including Under 23, Elite and New Zealand University. In 2009, an Eight competed in China.

Scullers, Elyse Fraser and Fergus Fauvel competed at the World University Rowing Championships in August 2010. Fauvel was placed fifth in the men's Sculls. This year Bryce Abernethy (Former NZU21 rower) and Lisa Owen (Former NZU23 rower) are competing in the World University Rowing Championships.

The Club Coach in 2010, Grant Craies, is a former Cambridge University coach.

Nathan Cohen is a two-time world champion and Olympic champion rower. Current members Alistar Bond and Fiona Bourke are part of the New Zealand Elite Team Competing in the World Rowing Championships in Amsterdam. Alumni Rowers Rebecca Scown and Louise Trappitt are also competing.

== Facilities ==
Today the Club is housed in the Otago University Students Association (OUSA) Aquatic Centre, which is at the end of Magnet Street Dunedin. The Centre has a large boat bay for the Club's fleet of boats and an indoor rowing tank – the only one of its kind in New Zealand, as well as 24 Concept II and 4 row-perfect ergometers, 4 spin bikes and also boasts a large function centre which is used for both functions and as a training space.

== Awards ==
The Club held the Hebberley Shield from 2002 to 2009, a record setting run, and now again in 2013–2014.
