= New College, University of New South Wales =

Residential college of the University of New South Wales

New College
- University of New South Wales
- Location: Anzac Parade, Kensington, Sydney
- Full name: New College
- Motto: Initium Sapientiae Timor Domini (Latin)
- Motto in English: The Fear of the Lord is the Beginning of Wisdom
- Established: 1969
- Named for: New College, Oxford
- Master: Bill Peirson
- Undergraduates: 247
- Postgraduates: 315
- Website: newcollege.unsw.edu.au

New College, University of New South Wales is a residential college, located in the UNSW campus in Sydney. The college is organised around on Anglican principles. About 250 undergraduate students, both local and international and of a variety of backgrounds, live in the original college building, and 315 graduate students are housed in the nearby New College Village. New College is also home to the Centre for Christian Apologetics, Scholarship and Education (CASE) which specialises in Christian apologetics.

== History ==
New College was founded in 1969 as part of the work of the New University Colleges' Council, who instigated a no alcohol policy.

The college has two quadrangles similar to that of Basser College which was built 10 years earlier, in 1959.

The first Master was Reverend Noel A. Pollard, who filled that role until 1973, when he was succeeded by Dr Stuart Barton Babbage. In 1983 Rev Dr Bruce Kaye became master, and he held the position until 1994, when the task was taken up by Dr Allan Beavis. Trevor Cairney was named Master in 2002, and Bill Pierson has been the current Master since his appointment in 2017.

New College celebrated its 50th anniversary in 2019.

== Leadership and direction ==
The college is governed by a Board who appoints a Master of the college. The current Master of the college is Adjunct Professor Bill Pierson, and the Dean of Residents is Jonathan Billingham. To maintain a strong academic focus, the college provides eight student residential advisors and eleven academic tutors. The original New College building enforces a strict no alcohol policy while in College itself.

== Student body and activities ==
To be accepted into New College, students interact with Academic Referees, present characters referees and are given interviews with the Dean of Residents to determine their suitability.

In the undergraduate community, the student body is represented by the New College Student Association (NCSA), which facilitates and develops community involvement, both within the college and externally.

New College's student committees organise and run many events with the college, including an annual college ski trip, a wine and cheese tasting weekend and service trip working with children in the remote community of Bourke. Annual events include an Orientation week, the NCSA Winter Ball, Night in White, Band Night and the Fresher vs Oldies sporting events.

New College hosts a formal dinner every four to six weeks, with a well-known guest speaker from politics, science, business, sport or entertainment. Previous guests include former Prime Ministers Kevin Rudd and John Howard, long-term Governor of New South Wales Marie Bashir, former NSW Premier Bob Carr, Host of at the Movies Margaret Pomeranz and former Wallabies Captain, now Investment Banker Nick Farr-Jones. Students are given the opportunity to meet and speak to the guests after the dinner.

New College students stage a play or musical and a revue on campus each year. The New College Revue is the longest-running annual revue on campus at UNSW.

== Village ==
In August 2006, New College began construction of a 315-bed postgraduate residential village called New College Village, on a site diagonally opposite New College on UNSW western campus. This project was overseen by the college Master, Trevor Cairney. The site opened in early 2009, and houses about 315 students, primarily international postgraduate students from over 50 nations. Like the original New College, it provides academic tutors and pastoral care. In 2020 the Dean of New College Village is Susan Bazzana. New College Village consists of a mixture of studio apartments and 5–6 bedroom shared apartments.

== Centre for Christian Apologetics, Scholarship and Education (CASE) ==
Formerly known as Centre for Apologetic Scholarship and Education, the Centre for Christian Apologetics, Scholarship and Education was established in 2002 by Trevor Cairney as an activity of New College. Its first was director was Greg J Clarke. The aim of the centre is to explore Christianity in the context of mainstream university study and research, and educate the community on the place of the Christian worldview. CASE regularly holds seminars, conferences and courses, it runs a scholars program for current PhD students, and it produces the quarterly magazine, Case.

== See also ==
- Anglican Diocese of Sydney
- University of New South Wales
