= Tristan Jepson =

Australian law graduate and writer

Tristan Jepson (1978 – 28 October 2004) was an Australian law graduate, writer, and comedic actor. He suffered from depression throughout his student years, and took his own life in the year following his graduation from the University of New South Wales.

After his death, his parents set up the Tristan Jepson Memorial Foundation (TJMF), which from 2018 has been run by Mind Count, a volunteer-run charitable organisation. The foundation, in collaboration with the university initially, has hosted a series of lectures since 2006. Initially called the Tristan Jepson Memorial Lecture, its name was changed in 2018 to Minds Count Foundation Annual Lecture, or simply Minds Count Lecture.

== Early life and education ==
Tristan Jepson was born in late September or 1 October 1978. His father, George, was a public hospital administrator, and his mother, Marie, a special education teacher. They were Christians.

educated at Trinity Grammar School, where he was a prefect, and the University of New South Wales. He graduated in 2003.

== Comedy ==
While still an undergraduate law student, he began to write and perform comedy as director of the University of New South Wales' Law Revue.

After graduating in 2003, he joined the cast of the AFI Award nominated sketch comedy TV programme Big Bite, where he was perhaps best known for impersonations of Tom Gleisner in parody sketches of The Panel.

== Death and legacy ==
Jepson had been diagnosed with clinical depression in 1998, and suffered bouts during his university years. He was on medication some of the time, which affected his self-esteem as it caused him to put on a lot of weight, and to lose hair. For some months before his death, he worked briefly as a researcher for a barrister and worked for legal aid, but struggled to get permanent employment.

On 28 October 2004 he suicided by drug overdose, four weeks after his 26th birthday.

Andrea Durbach, an associate professor at the University of NSW, adapted her fourth-year-law course to include a seminar on mental illness after discussions with George and Marie Jepson.

The Tristan Jepson Memorial Foundation (TJMF), named in his honour, is an organisation which works to foreground issues of mental illness in the law, including law students, graduates, practising lawyers, and judges. After the Jepson family stepped down from the board in 2018, the foundation continued operating as the Minds Count Foundation. Minds Count is an independent, volunteer-run, charitable organisation.

=== Lecture series ===
In 2006 the University of New South Wales inaugurated an annual Tristan Jepson Memorial Lecture.

The inaugural lecture was held on 7 September 2006, delivered by psychiatrist Mamta Gautam and senior counsel Craig Leggat.

The second in the series was delivered by Ian Hickie, executive director of the Brain and Mind Research Institute at the University of Sydney, who said that around a third of solicitors suffered from depression.

In 2014, the lecture was delivered by High Court of Australia justice Virginia Bell.

From 2018, the lecture series has been named the Minds Count Foundation Annual Lecture, or simply Minds Count Lecture.

In 2025, there were two keynote speakers, Elizabeth Morris, Chief Judge of the Local Court of the Northern Territory, and Michael Allen, Chief Magistrate of the Local Court of New South Wales.
