= Philip Baxter College, University of New South Wales =

University residential college in Sydney, New South Wales

Philip Baxter College
- University of New South Wales
- Location: UNSW campus, Kensington
- Full name: Philip Baxter College
- Established: 1966
- Named for: Sir Philip Baxter
- Sister colleges: Goldstein College, Basser College, Fig Tree Hall, Colombo House, UNSW Hall.
- Head of Colleges: Leah Hill
- President: Zoe Macintosh
- Dean: Lauren Ryznar
- Residents: 215
- Website: The Kensington Colleges

Philip Baxter College, University of New South Wales is a residential college at the University of New South Wales in Kensington, Sydney, Australia. Phillip Baxter College and its two neighbouring Colleges, Goldstein and Basser, are collectively known as the Kensington Colleges. Philip Baxter college is the largest of The Kensington Colleges. Residents generally stay in Baxter for two or three years before ending their college tenure. A student had to remain at College for two and a half years, to be named Honorary College Valedictorian. Residents are provided with three meals per day during session at the nearby Goldstein Dining Hall, which is shared with residents of the other Kensington Colleges - Basser, Goldstein and Fig Tree Hall.

== History ==
Along with Basser and Goldstein Colleges, Philip Baxter College forms part of the original Kensington Colleges, which have been owned and operated by the University of New South Wales since they were founded in 1959.

The original college was constructed over two years from 1964 to 1966, and opened in 1966. It was the third residential college on the university campus to open.

Named after Sir John Philip Baxter, a former Vice-Chancellor at UNSW and Chairman of the Sydney Opera House Trust, Baxter College took its first residents in 1966.

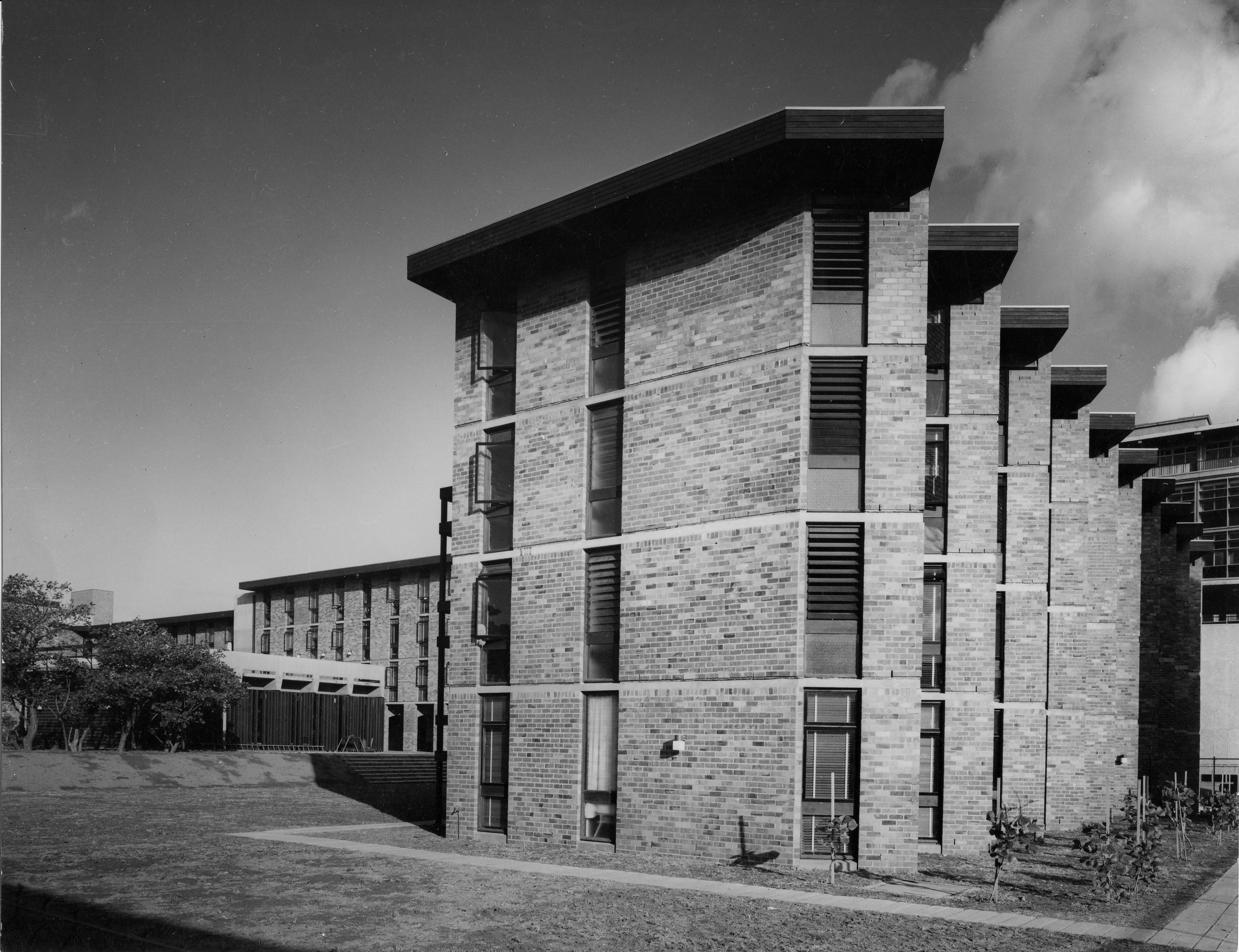
The original Philip Baxter College Building (D14/D18) in 1966

=== 1985 Conflict with College Master ===
In 1985, a conflict arose between college students and "Master" Peter O'Brien, the head of multiple colleges, over allegations of "overuse of authority." This led to the formation of the Students Submission Committee, which aimed to remove O'Brien from his position. The committee was composed of students from Baxter, Basser, and Goldstein colleges and was led by Paul Elton, the president of the 1986 Baxter College House Committee. The committee petitioned the University Council to investigate O'Brien's plans to make Baxter a first-year student only college, the removal of Valedictory dinners, the misuse of house funds, the reinstatement of expelled students, and the fairness of disciplinary actions. On May 12, 1986, the University Council established an ad hoc committee to investigate the matter. O'Brien resigned on July 11, 1986, and was replaced by Dr. Bruce Avis, who discontinued the title of "Master." The events and investigation by the Kensington Colleges Inquiry were reported by the UNSW student newspaper Tharunka, with O'Brien threatening legal action against the publication in 1985 for publishing "allegedly defamatory letters".

=== Redevelopment ===
During 2012 and 2013 Baxter College also housed residents from sister colleges Basser and Goldstein during a major redevelopment of UNSW's student accommodation facility. The $110 million redevelopment that saw The Kensington Colleges completely re-developed and three new colleges added to the portfolio: Fig Tree Hall, Colombo House and UNSW Hall.

The redeveloped Philip Baxter College opened in Semester 1, 2014. It accommodates 201 students in a mixture of rooms with either en suite or shared bathroom facilities. Philip Baxter College has expansive common and study areas as well as a rooftop garden. The College shares landscaped garden areas with Basser, Goldstein and the newly established residences; Fig Tree Hall and Colombo House.

== Student Life ==
The College engages in a variety of social and sporting events annually, including the inter-college competition known as The Ruth Wheen Cup, along with off-campus activities in Coogee, Randwick, and Sydney CBD. Residents, fondly referred to as "ressies," take part in weekly coffee nights where the House Committee introduces new activities, events, and updates to the broader college community.

All student activities are coordinated by the student elected House Committee and overseen by the Dean of College. Recurring activities include harbour cruises on Sydney Harbour, with sister colleges attending; the "Baxter Ball"; "REXTAB" - where ex-residents ("exressies") are invited to attend and "Baxyard Blitz" where an entire floor of the college themes and decorates their living spaces to be judged by the Dean of College. Valedictory dinners are served at the conclusion of each teaching period, often with speeches from notable guest speakers, the dean and House Committee president

Residents at Baxter are also encouraged to produce new traditions and enterprises. A notable example is the "J&D" coffee cart which is run by students and services all of the Kensington Colleges. The profits from the cart are donated to a charitable cause.
