= UNSW Hall, University of New South Wales =

UNSW Hall
- University of New South Wales
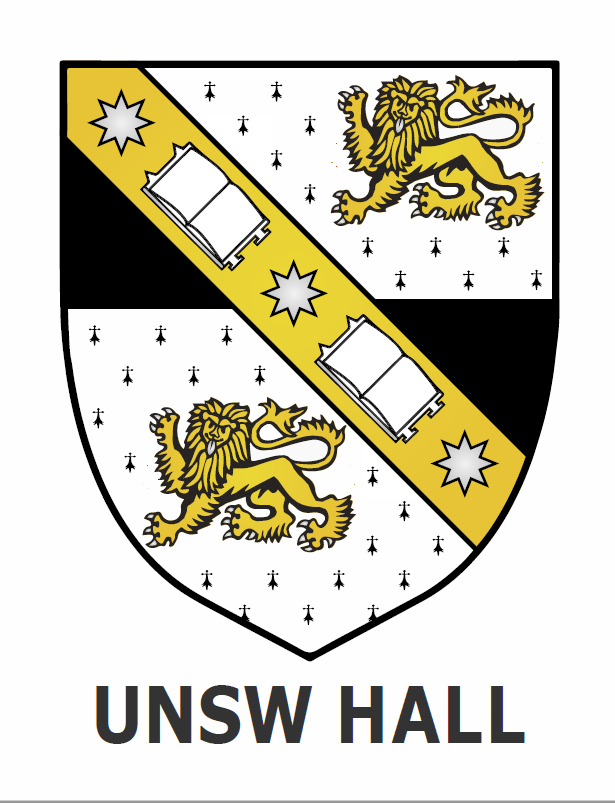
- Location: UNSW campus, Kensington
- Coordinates: 33.916098°S 151.230343°E
- Full name: UNSW Hall
- Established: 2014
- Sister colleges: Basser College, Philip Baxter College, Goldstein College, Fig Tree Hall, Colombo House.
- Dean: Isabelle Creagh
- Website: accommodation.unsw.edu.au/colleges/unsw-hall

UNSW Hall is a residential college that is a part of University of New South Wales' student accommodation portfolio, founded in 2014.

== History ==
At its founding, UNSW Hall occupied a facility built in 1959 that previously hosted Phillip Baxter College, then all three Kensington colleges during their redevelopment. In 2018, this facility was identified by the university as end of life, threatening UNSW Hall with closure. Following a "Save UNSW Hall" campaign by residents against this, the college relocated to its current site on the north side of the University of New South Wales' Kensington campus in 2019, occupying one tower in the UNSW Village complex.

== Accommodation ==
UNSW Hall is a fully-catered facility, offering students three meals per day at the Goldstein dining hall during session. The accommodation has shared bathrooms and single rooms.

== House Committee ==
The House Committee is composed of student leaders elected annually by residents in various portfolios aimed at offering residents opportunities to be involved in extra-curricular activities. The House Committee includes an executive group of a president, secretary and treasurer and administers a budget each year across areas such as cultural, sport, social and communications.
