= Austin College, University of New England (Australia) =

Australian college

Austin College
- University of New England
- Coordinates: 30.4975°S 151.6410°E
- Motto: Through Living We Learn
- Established: 1972
- Named for: Dr R. B. Austin
- Head: Ms Andrea Gledhill, BFA GDipEd
- Residents: 288 undergraduates annually (rooms)
- Website: www.une.edu.au/austin/

Austin College is a college at the University of New England, Armidale, NSW, Australia. It is the second youngest of the established colleges, opening as an all girls college in 1972 . It proceeded to change to a co-ed tertiary residential college, which it remains to this day.

It has the capacity to house 288 students at any one time during the year. It caters for both internal and external students and serves as residency for many travelling university and school sporting teams.

Austin has a range of facilities including a common room and kitchenette on every floor, a licensed bar, music room, exercise room, a large common room, bike shed, laundries and a large dining hall. All rooms are centrally heated and have Ethernet, NBN, phone and TV aerial connections.

== History ==
Austin College celebrated its 40th anniversary and has provided a home for more than 8000 students since its opening in 1972. The college was named to honour the service to the University of Dr R.B. Austin, who was the government medical officer in Armidale at the time of the college’s establishment.

Austin is the second youngest of the eight residential colleges at the University of New England and offers accommodation for 288 residents. The first master, Dr Brian Seppelt, remained in the position until 1977 when Dr Alan McKenzie took over. Dr McKenzie remained in the position for 31 years until he retired in 2009 and the position went to David Ward.

In 2010, Austin College gained its current head, Ms Andrea Gledhill.

In 2014 Austin began fundraising sponsorship for the Westpac Rescue Helicopter Service, sponsoring the WRHS and Camp Quality in 2015.

== Student positions ==
=== Resident fellows ===
These are a group of senior students who are responsible for the general well-being of the college and its residents. They are also responsible for fire, security and medical emergencies.

=== Academic mentors ===
These senior students provide academic assistance to the residents of Austin College. The mentors are also responsible for disseminating information about the other programs offered by the Academic Skills Office and encouraging the first year students to avail themselves of these services.

=== Club committee ===
This group of students are elected by the residents of Austin College to provide social activities for the college including sport, drama and performance, media and communications as well as social events. As part of Austin's sporting culture it participates in PT (President's Trophy) & MB (Mary Bagnall Trophy), which are UNE Intercollegiate competitions which range from Soccer to Badminton to Swimming. Similarly, Austin also partakes in the UNE SFK Intercollegiate cultural competitions, which include musical ensembles to arts & craft. slay

Austin College has held the PT trophy in 1992, 2001 2010, 2013, 2014 & 2015 and the MB trophy in 1973, 1974, 1977, 1994, 1995, 2010, 2013, 2014, 2015 & 2023.
