= Hebberley Shield =

New Zealand sport trophy

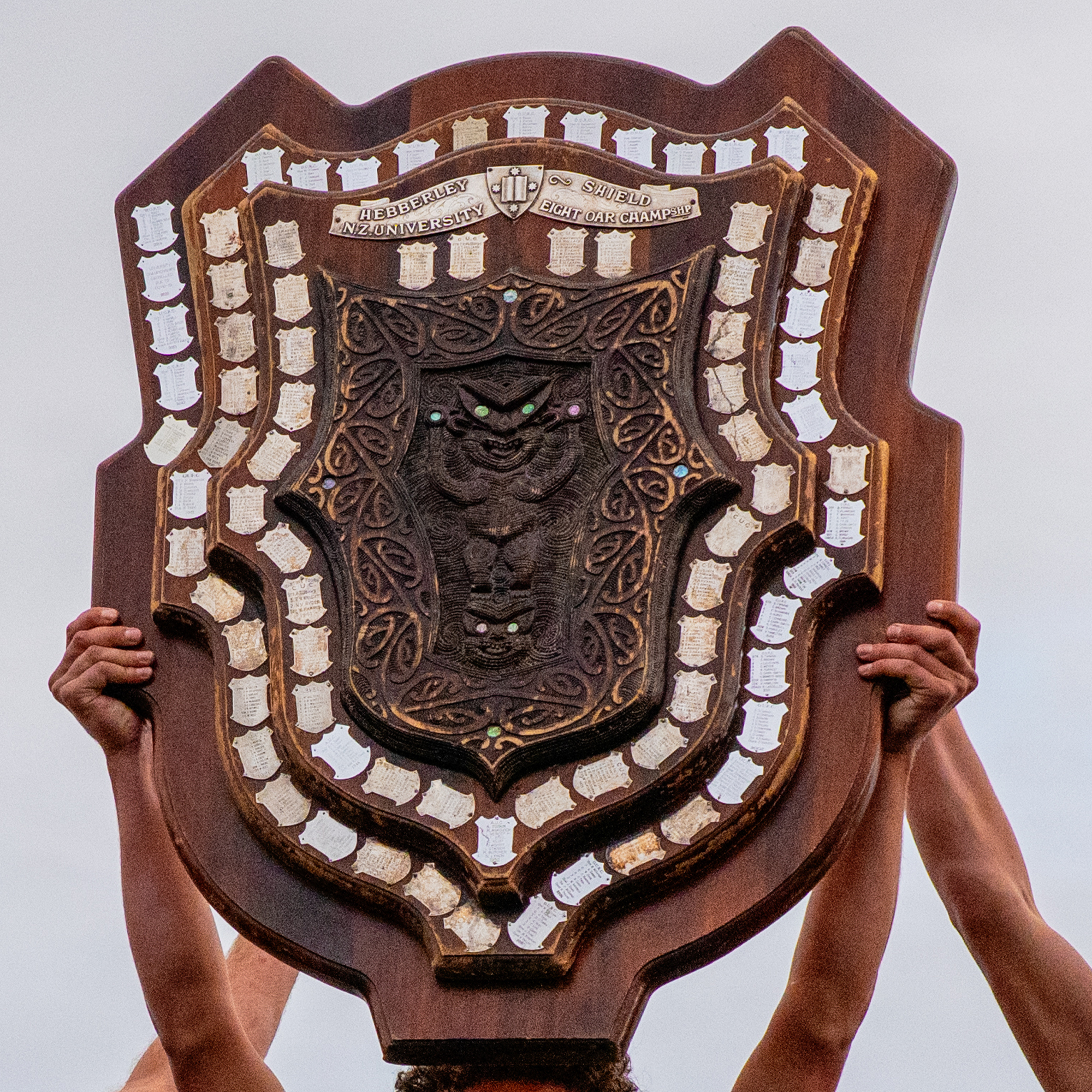
- Hebberley Shield in 2025
- Sport: Rowing (sport)
- Type: Inter-University Trophy
- Event: New Zealand University Games
- First contested: 1929
- Last contested: 2026
- Current Champions: University of Canterbury

The Hebberley Shield, awarded annually to the winning Men's Championship Eight crew at the New Zealand University Rowing Championships, is the oldest and most prestigious men's rowing trophy in New Zealand University Sport.

First contested in 1928 or 1929, Thomas Henry Heberley was the craftsman who carved the shield. The race for the shield is held over a 3.2 km (2.0 mi) course, which is longer than the standard 2 km (1.2 mi) rowing course. This distinction symbolises excellence and tradition in the inter-university rowing competition.

Being the most sought-after title in New Zealand university rowing, it holds a reputation similar to the Oxford–Cambridge Boat Race in the United Kingdom, though within a national context. Many crews that have won the Hebberley Shield have gone on to produce national representatives and Olympians.

== History ==
=== Origins ===
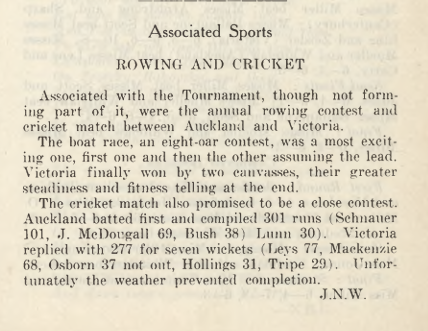
First Race in 1928 - Craccum (26 April 1928)

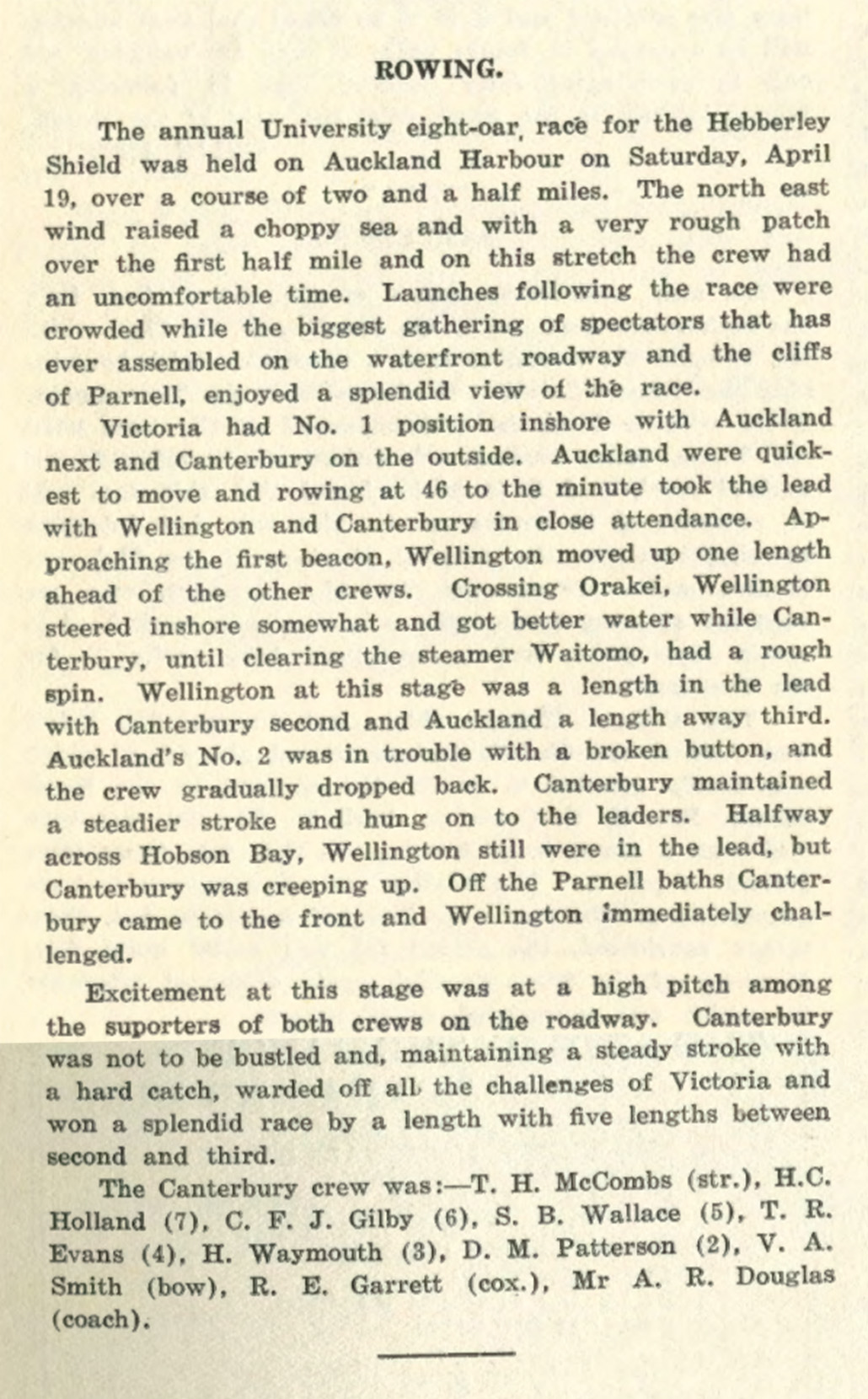
Canterbury's First Win of the Shield – Canta (3 May 1930)

The concept of an inter‑university rowing championship in New Zealand emerged in 1927, sparked when the Brooker brothers (rowing for Victoria and Waitematā clubs) discussed aboard the TSS Tamahine the idea of an inter-college eight after attending regatta in Picton. Within just four weeks they organised a match between Auckland and Victoria universities in an four-oar event held over Easter Saturday, effectively launching university competition in the New Zealand rowing scene.

Over the ensuing two years, inter‑university rowing gradually formalised into part of the New Zealand University Games, with regattas staged at venues including Auckland, Lyttelton and Otago harbours. To elevate the profile of the competition, the Hebberley Shield was commissioned and carved in 1928.

The first inter-university eight-oar race took place on Easter Saturday in 1928. It was a match between Victoria University and Auckland University. In 1929 the race was formally incorporated into the New Zealand University Games and designated as the "Men’s Championship Eight" event. This event immediately became the centerpiece of the university rowing competition, with crews representing major universities vying for the prestigious prize.

=== Shield ===
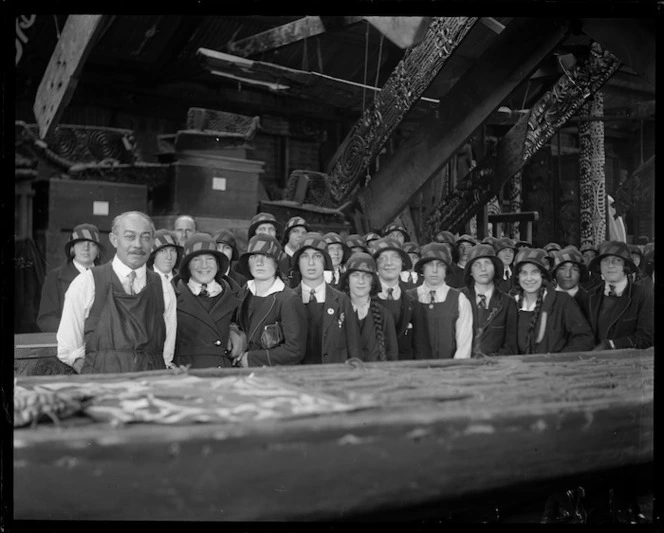
Thomas Henry Heberley (1932)

The shield was carved in 1928 by Thomas Henry Heberley, a renowned master carver of Māori descent affiliated with Te Āti Awa. Hebberley worked at the Dominion Museum in Wellington (now part of Te Papa Tongarewa), where he became one of the first Māori carvers to be formally employed in a national cultural institution.

Trained in both traditional Māori carving and European techniques, Hebberley played a key role in bridging indigenous and colonial art traditions during the early 20th century. His craftsmanship was highly sought after, and he was commissioned to create the shield as a prestigious and symbolic trophy for the emerging New Zealand university rowing scene. The result was a richly detailed piece incorporating both beautiful Māori design and fine workmanship.

=== Legacy ===
Early competitions were dominated by Victoria University, who won the inaugural race and remained a strong force into the 1930s and 1960s. However, from the mid-20th century onward, Canterbury rose to prominence, establishing one of the most formidable records in the competition’s history. With 36 total titles spanning from 1930 to 2026, Canterbury has enjoyed long periods of dominance, including title runs across the 1960s, 1970s, and a strong resurgence in the 2010s and 2020s.

Otago, with 32 wins, is the second most successful university and defined the modern era of the Hebberley Shield. The university produced one of the competition's most remarkable dynasties between 2002 and 2009, winning eight consecutive titles, a record unmatched to date. Otago's strong rowing culture and athlete development programme have helped produce Olympic champions and national representatives, making it a powerhouse in university rowing. Auckland also maintained strong showings throughout the mid-20th century, reaching a total of 12 titles, while Waikato, a newer force, broke through in 2011 and won 4 titles through the 2010s.

Though smaller in number, other universities have had notable moments. Lincoln University captured their sole victory in 1972, while Victoria, despite not winning since 1968, remains historically significant for their early success.

== Participating Universities ==
University	Abbrv.	Location	Ranking	Wins	First win	Last win
University of Canterbury Rowing Club	UCRC	Christchurch, Canterbury	1	36	1930	2026
Otago University Rowing Club	OURC	Dunedin, Otago	2	32	1939	2024
Auckland University Boat Club	AUBC	Auckland Central, Auckland	3	10	1934	2012
Victoria University Rowing Club	VURC	Wellington, Greater Wellington	4	8	1928*	1968
University of Waikato Rowing	UOWR	Hamilton, Waikato	5	3	2011	2018
Lincoln University Rowing Club	LURC	Lincoln, Canterbury	6	1	1972	1972
Massey University Rowing Club	MURC	Palmerston North, Manawatu-Whanganui	7=	0	–	–
Auckland University of Technology	AUT	Auckland Central, Auckland	7=	0	–	–

== Past Winning Crews ==
Year	Winner	Crew	Coach(es)
1928*	Victoria	F. H. Mullins (stroke), K. F. Crease, F. M. Bell, A. Taylor, C. Steele, S. G. Rees, G. Thomas, R. Moffat, T. Kearns (cox) *Hebberley was not yet presented for competition	E. Diehl
1929	Victoria	F. M. Bell (stroke), F. H. Mullins, C. Steele, A. Gibbons, R. Moffat, S. G. Rees, R. McGavin, N. H. Russell (bow)	
1930	Canterbury	T. H. McCombs (stroke), H. C. Holland, C. F. J. Gilby, S. B. Wallace, T. R. Evans, H. Waymouth, D. M. Patterson, V. A. Smith, R. E. Garrett (cox)	A. R. Douglas
1931	Victoria	F. M. Bell (stroke), D. F. Gane, W. J. Kemp, C. Dixon, W. Steward, D. G. Steele, W. K. McGavin, R. Grant (bow)	F. H. Mullins
1932	Canterbury	H. Waymouth (stroke), S. B. Wallace, M. Hunter, H. R. Watts, T. R. Evans, R. M. Simmers, D. M. Patterson, L. L. Hosking, E. H. Carew (cox)	F. H. Brown
1933	Canterbury	L. L. Hosking (stroke), H. R. Watts, M. Hunter, R. M. Simmers, T. R. Evans, H. D. Nelson, T. H. McCombs, D. M. Patterson, E. H. Carew (cox)	F. H. Brown
1934	Auckland	O. J. C. Mason (stroke), J. C. McComish, S. B. Sheath, H. T. Lee, P. Shirley, J. A. Parsons, J. P. Hooper, D. Robinson, E. Henderson (cox)	T Marshall
1935	Auckland	O. J. C. Mason (stroke), H. T. Lee, J. P. Hooper, G. C. Dalton, P. F. Shirley, E. H. Sealy, H. T. Jellie, J. A. Parsons, E. Henderson (cox)	V. Smith
1936	Canterbury	H. A. Eaton, S. M. Gray, M. T. Hunter, H. Millard, R. W. K. White, W. M. Graham, J. O. Renaut, J. M. Steeds, A. J. Nicholson (cox)	
1937	Victoria	K. W. Barnes (stroke), F. G. Bowling, R. P. Hansen, J. B. Bullock, N. M. Rose, R. J. McElroy, G. C. Broad, A. R. Burge, F. Stafford (cox)	E. J. Barnes
1938	Victoria	G. C. Broad (stroke), R. P. Hansen, N. M. Rose, J. B. Bullock, R. E. Hermans, T. S. Mahood, G. T. Ryan, A. R. Bridge, F. D. Stafford (cox)	
1939	Otago	A. N. White, F. J. Cairns, R, B, G, Cook, M. G. O’Callaghan, F. J. Gruar, E. L. Gillies, S. White, J. N. Ramsay, B. H. R. Hill (cox)	J. P. Vallis
1940	Canterbury	L. G. Bell (stroke), J. M. Steeds, W. W. Young, P. H. Tovey, E. W. Wright, A. G. Hunter, W. Harris, M. L. Newman, A. H. H. Martin (cox)	M. Hunter
1941	Canterbury	A. T. Johns (stroke), E. W. Wright, N. V. Ryder, W. Harris (WARTIME FOURS)	
1942	No competition due to World War II		
1943	No competition due to World War II		
1944	No competition due to World War II		
1945	Canterbury	J. W. Wilson (stroke), G. A. Drummond, E. K. Millett, B. J. Walker, K. G. Knight, A. V. Hatrick, H. G. Caplen, K. Douglass, J. C. Muir (cox)	
1946	Otago	M. Walters (stroke), G. N. Wimsett, E. T. MacDonald, D. J. Dobson, H. Culter, N. A. Woods, L. S. James, H. K. Watt, H. B. F. Harris (cox)	
1947	Canterbury	?	
1948	Auckland	A. W. Grant (stroke), D. G. Croot, K. Ashby, M. B. Antonievich, D. Kronfeld, K. S. James, D. P. Walls, J. J. Molloy, Miss N. S. T. Croot (cox)	
1949	Auckland	M. B. Antonievich, J. Goulding, A. W. Grant, E. J. Lowden. S. J. Molloy, R. M. Tomkins, R. M. Tonkin, K. Watt	
1950	Canterbury	N. M. West (stroke), N. W. Glasgow, F. J. Connell, R. F. Moginie, P. J. A. Page, J. G. Samuel, R. D. Beckwith, K. M. Newberry, E. Gardner (cox)	
1951	Auckland	R. Tonkin (stroke), D. Bodley, I. Mercep, V. Blaskovich, R. Mlicich, R. T. Sheil, R. Anderson, P. Harpham, N. Lynch (cox)	
1952	Auckland	R. Tonkin (stroke), V. Blaskovich, I. Mercep, R. T. Sheil, J. Kemp, K. Ashby, I. Stanich, P. Butcher, N. Lynch (cox)	
1953	Auckland	R. Anderson (stroke), V. Blaskovich, I. Mercep, R. Sheil, C. Martin, P. Irvine, R. Stanich, M. Worseldine, N. Lynch (cox)	
1954	Auckland	?	
1955	Otago	D. MacDonald (stroke), J. van der Leigh, K. McCredie, M. Irwin, J. Sinclair, R. Moginie, I. Hannon, J. McLaurin	
1956	Canterbury	F. Harland (stroke), W. Jones, B. Jones, R. Barrett, E. McCalam, J. Sewell, P. Spooner, M. Worseldine, B. Armstrong (cox)	
1957	Otago	M Gill (stroke), W Warden, D MacDonald, M Irwin, J Makim, D Calder, J Braithwaite, J Scott, D Prowse (cox)	G Thorn
1958	Otago	J Sinclair (stroke), W Warden, C Hurring, M Irwin, D Davidson, D Calder, J Scott, C Harper	G Thorn
1959	Otago	M Gill (stroke), C Harper, D Davidson, D Calder, D Rae, P Parkinson, W Tongue, J Scott	G Thorn
1960	Canterbury	K. H. B. McKinnon (stroke), D. McDonnell, C. J. H. O. Tobin, F. J. Grant, H. J. Cranfield, W. A. Warden, D. T. Riley, R. B. McCorkindale	
1961	Auckland	N. Paton (stroke), T. Wallace, R. Brown, J. Potter, G. Cave, A. Wilson, M. Walker, D. Arcus	K. Ashby
1962	Canterbury	Tim Dobbie (stroke), Don Holden, Dave Dearsley, Tom Just, Brian Walford, Barry Hill, Tony Hinkley, Owen Burton, Chris Timms (Cox)	Norm West
1963	Canterbury	?	
1964	Canterbury	T. Dobbie (stroke), W. Taylor, T. Just, J. Hunter, N. Smith, B. Walford, W. Mills, I. Riley	
1965	Canterbury	?	
1966	Victoria	P. G. MacCauley, J. G. Gibbons, O. R. Gilbert, R. G. Trott, J. R. Pope, S. J. Dawson, R. J. M. Bailey, W.H. Noakes, B.A.Jones (cox)	B.A.Jones
1967	Victoria	R. J. Joyce (stroke), P. G. MacCauley, P. W. Wear, J. G. Gibbons, O. R. Gilbert, R. G. Trott, J. R. Pope, B. J. Brown, B.A.Jones (cox)	B.A.Jones
1968	Victoria	?	
1969	Canterbury	D. Jack (stroke), A. Winwood, D. Lindstrom, R. Pickrill, G. Smith, D. Rawson, I. Brownlee, R. Cornes, J. Harding (cox)	
1970	Canterbury	D. Jack (stroke), A. Winwood, G. Smith, R. Warren, T. Coker, R. Pickrill, A. Hughes-Johnson, D. Rawson, J. Harding (cox)	
1971	Canterbury	P. McVinnie (stroke), R. Pickrill, T. Coker, P. Walker, B. Rowe, V. Allen, P. O’Connor, D. Rawson, J. Harding (cox)	
1972	Lincoln	D. Nicholls (stroke), G. Wright, J. Glenn, E. Tye, A. Craw, P. Hodges, R. Phillips, P. Young, M. Middleton (cox)	
1973	Canterbury	B. Allen (stroke), B. Rowe, T. Coker, A. Bowker, G. Pearce, D. Littlejohn, C. Mayhew, S. Mossman, W. Glassey (cox)	
1974	Canterbury	B. Allen, B. Rowe, G. Pierce, C. Hannah, C. Thorsen, G. Loe, A. Stewart, S. Mossman, R. McCall (cox)	W. H. Barker
1975	Otago	G. Hill, M. Holloway, J. Sutherland, M. Matich, B. Allen, A. Brook, C. Morgan, A. Kriechbaum, B. Cameron (cox)	
1976	Otago	M. Holloway (stroke), M. Matich, J. Sutherland, A. Brook, J. Gee, B. Allen, L. Eade, A. Kriechbaum, M. Metzger (cox)	
1977	Canterbury	B. C. Allen (stroke), A. B. Brook, C. R. Thorsen, A. J. Stewart, C. J. Mayhew, D. R. Manning, C. C. Duncan, M. J. Meates, P. E. Gamble (cox)	
1978	?	?	
1979	Otago	P. Tong (stroke), A. Morris, P. Cossens, A. Speed, B. Cooper, N. Gilchrist, M. Gimlett, M. Seeley, M. Rees (cox)	
1980	Otago	P. Tong (stroke), R. Bruce, P. Cossens, A. Speed, B. Cooper, M. Gimlett, P. Morrison, A. Morris, M. Rees (cox)	
1981	Otago	P. Morrison (stroke), R. Bruce, P. Cossens, M. Gimblett, B. Cooper, A. Speed, S. Beck, A. Morris, M. Rees (cox)	
1982	Auckland	M. Eliassen, A. Bruce, E. Verdonk, S. Ashby, T. Lawton, R. Williams, D. Craig, P. Frederickson, A. Bowman (cox)	
1983	Otago	S. Beck, A. Rowe, T. Signal, M. Bamford, B. Cooper, M. Gimblett, B. Smith, S. Borlase, S. Stables (cox)	
1984	Otago	B. Smith, I. McVicar, T. Signal, M. Tamis, A. Mahon, W. Gilbertson, T. Hurring, D. Caughey, M. Rees (cox)	
1985	Canterbury	A. Skelton, M. Buckeridge, S. Borlase, M. Tamis, A. McCrorie, C. Langedale, R. Boswell, A. Burns, M. Rees (cox)	
1986	Canterbury	K. Meates, R. Coorey, S. Borlase, M. Tamis, A. Parkyn, K. Eden, A. Skelton, A. Burns, M. Rees (cox)	
1987	Canterbury	A. Skelton, A. Armstrong, S. Borlase, G. Lannen, J. Meates, S. Brownlee, G. Perry, M. Buckeridge, T. Brinkman (cox)	
1988	Canterbury	G. Perry, K. Calvert, A. Parkyn, S. Borlase, A. Skelton, I. Jones, A. Blake, G. Strang, D. McPherson (cox)	D. Burrowes
1989	Canterbury	S. Borlase, I. Jones, A. Blake, G. Strang, J. Wilkinson, A. Taylor, G. Lannam, D. Rutherford, B. King (cox)	D. Burrowes
1990	Canterbury	G. Perry, N. McGowan, S. Brownlee, R. Pritchard, A. Berry, P. Peoples, R. Syme, A. Brown, M. Levy (cox)	
1991	Otago	Michael Lightbourne, Michael Thompson, Warren Campbell, Alex Berry, Brett Smith, Brice Williams, Marcel Grey, Richard Lascelles, Alexandra Dodd (cox)	
1992	No competition due to Meningitis scare		
1993	Otago	M. Hindmarsh, A. Matheson, B. Sowman, M. Talbot, G. Stewart, R. Thomson, C. Vincent, A. Murdoch, H. Graham (cox)	
1994	Auckland	I. McAlley, D. Gierra, L. Clemment, A. McKenzie, S. Lockhart, S. Dunlop, R. Boyes, B. Erskine, J. Kingston (cox)	
1995	Otago	G. Stewart, B. Sowman, M. Straker, P. Warwick, T. Hinds, D. Foggo, G. Sinclair, G. Garthwaite, B. Wilson (cox)	F. Strachan
1996	Otago	B. Sowman, G. Stewart, M. Straker, D. Foggo, T. Hinds, N. Twaddle, G. Sinclair, A. Cotter, B. Wilson (cox)	
1997	Otago	Gary Stewart, Anton Cotter, Matt Straker, Dan Foggo, John Turnbull, Nathan Twaddle, Glen Sinclair, Richard Hollebon, George Grove (cox)	Dave Hanan
1998	Canterbury	Ben Forrest, Chris Flanagan, Foss Shanahan, Aaron Hurst, Harvey Tyler, David Carr-Smith, Christian Lehndorf, Chris Brown, Emily Worsp (cox)	Charlie Flanagan
1999	Canterbury	Ben Forrest, Aaron Hurst, James Reid, Foss Shanahan, Simon Hoadley, David Carr-Smith, Christian Lehndorf, Chris Brown, Ginny Hamilton (cox)	Charlie Flanagan
2000	Canterbury	Glen Twining (stroke), Chris Brown, Foss Shanahan, Aaron Hurst, Christian Lehndorf, David Carr-Smith, Heath Turnbull, Simon Hoadley, Virginia Hamilton (cox)	
2001	Canterbury	Glen Twining (stroke), Chris Brown, James Lucas, Carl Meyer, Ben Forrest, David Carr-Smith, Henry Giesen, Ben Hannifin, Virginia Hamilton (cox)	Richard Le Seles and Ben Forrest
2002	Otago	Grant Carroll (stroke), Andrew Crosland, Bruce Magee, Nick Barton, Paul Willets, Sam Cooper, Fraser Overwheel, Rob Creasy, Annie Robinson(cox)	Glen Sinclair
2003	Otago	Andrew Crosland (stroke), Nick Barton, Bruce Magee, Andre Sintmaartensdyk, Howie Ross, Richard Wing, Rob Creasy, Brooke Ebbett, Annie Robinson (cox)	Glen Sinclair
2004	Otago	Grant Carroll (stroke), Scott Gundesen, Hamish Bond, Sam Morrison, Peter Benny, Andrew Crosland, Kirk Archibald, Hamish Rowlands, Paul McGimpsey (cox)	Nick Phillips
2005	Otago	Brooke Ebbett (stroke), Adam Garden, Andrew Crosland, Nathan Cohen, Matt Archibald, Hamish Rowlands, Matt McGovern, Miles Bowker, Paul McGimpsey (cox)	Nick Phillips
2006	Otago	Matt McGovern (stroke), Adam Garden, Will Joyce, Sam Morrison, Jamie Twigg, Nathan Cohen, Matt Archibald, Justin Evans, Paul McGimpsey (cox)	Nick Phillips
2007	Otago	Matt McGovern (Stroke), Adam Garden, Jamie Twigg, Sam O'Connor, Elliot Riley, Campbell Lowe, Brooke Ebbett, Justin Evans, Michael Dessoulavy (cox)	Nick Phillips
2008	Otago	Jamie Orsbourn (Stroke), Matthew Adam, Matt McGovern, Campbell Lowe, Brad Ross, Dougal MacDuff, Richard Sharp, Todd Hale, Michael Dessoulavy (cox)	Nick Phillips
2009	Otago	Mark O'Connor, Alistair Bond, Jamie Orsbourn, Scott van den Bosch, William Shaw, Campbell Lowe, Matthew Adam, Todd Hale, Michael Dessoulavy (cox)	Nick Phillips
2010	Canterbury	Andrew King, Andrew O'Connor, Armin Svoboda, Ben Wooding, David Hatton, Hamish Borowczyk, Todd Petherick, Will Meates, Isabel McLernon (cox)	Dale Maher
2011	Waikato	Shaun Kirkham, Andrew Myers, Giacomo Thomas, Will Meates, Logan Roger, Chris Morrison, Matthew Glenn, Finian Scott, Lindsay McCowan (cox)	Mike Gilbert
2012	Auckland	Jefferson Haldane, Louis van Velthooven, Isaac Grainger, Johnathan Tait, Joseph Nihotte, Craig Little, Chris Rolls, Jordan Stanley, Corina Chilibeck (cox)	Sam Heveldt
2013	Otago	Scott Green (stroke), Andrew Potter, Corey McAffery, Liam Kettle, Adrian Riepen, Bryce Abernethy, Ryan Kelleher, Andrew Annear, Sachin Arulambalam (cox)	Justin Evans and Matt Smaill
2014	Otago	Bryce Abernethy (stroke), Corey McCaffrey, Andrew Potter, Ryan Kelleher, Mark Alm, Adrian Riepen, Scott Barnsdale, Elliot Harvey, Sachin Arulambalam (cox)	Glen Sinclair
2015	Waikato	Cameron Bartley (stroke), Charles Rogerson, Logan Rodger, Richard Power, Elliot Rhodes, Peter Byllemos, Martyn O'Leary, Joshua Earl, Caitlin Lawry (cox)	Matt Cameron
2016	Otago	Phillip Wilson (stroke), Andrew Potter, Tom Clyma, Hugo Elworthy, Sean Ducray, Sam Johnston, Simon Early, Bryce Abernethy, Sachin Arulambalam (cox)	Scott Gullery
2017	Otago	Scott Bezett (stroke), Sam Wilkins, Simon Early, Tom Cummack, Riley Bruce, Ari Palsson, Caleb Dallow, Corey Lewis, Kate Bolland (cox)	Scott Gullery and Nick Phillips
2018	Waikato	Drikus Conradie (stroke), Thomas Bedford, James Hall, Joshua Earl, Fergus McSwiney, James Brott, Joel Engelke, Daniel Tomlinson, Sarah Best (cox)	Richard Power
2019	Waikato	Jack Ready (stroke), Charlie Rogerson, Josh Toa, Tracie McLaren-Taplin, Joel Engelke, Martyn O'Leary, Jordon Gasson, Daniel Tomlinson, Ben Tyson (cox)	Laura Jefferies
2020	No competition due to the COVID-19 pandemic		
2021	Canterbury	Nathan Luff (stroke), Hamish Maxwell, George Howat, Jostien Leota-Butler, Murphy Waters, Hunter Pethers-Boak, Niko Kumarich, Will Johnston, Blake Campbell (cox)	
2022	Canterbury	Ned Botherway (stroke), Oli Welch, Flynn Watson, Zack Rumble, Hunter Pethers-Boak, Jack Chapman, George Johnson, Nathan Luff, Annabelle Scott (cox)	
2023	Otago	Fred Vavasour (stroke), Toby Robinson, Connor Bacchus, Tom Tothill, Ted Mayne, Jack Pearson, Ged Wall, Henry Clatworthy, Kaelin Reinsfield-Bree (cox)	Glen Sinclair
2024	Otago	Oscar Clatworthy (stroke), Jack Pearson, Fred Vavasour, Fynn Allison, Cody Johnson, Connor Bacchus, Ted Mayne, Henry Clatworthy, Kaelin Reinsfield-Bree (cox)	Glen Sinclair
2025	Canterbury	Will Mackintosh (stroke), Josh Syme, Fergus Johnston, Harry Galvan, Lewis Meates, Charlie Poulter, Jonty Mackintosh, Sam Wilson, Annabel Wynn-Williams (cox)	Hunter Pethers-Boak
2026	Canterbury	Fergus Johnston (stroke), Harry Galvan, William Mackintosh, Josh Syme, Jake Burrowes, Zachary Jenkins, Lewis Meates, Sam Wilson, Annabel Wynn-Williams (cox)	Hunter Pethers-Boak
