= Asopos de Vliet =

Student rowing club in the Netherlands

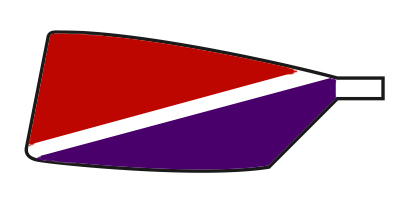
- Location: Leiderdorp, Netherlands
- Home water: Dwarswatering
- Founded: Asopos: October 1, 1962. De Vliet: 1905. Merger of Asopos and De Vliet in 1974
- University: Leiden University, University of Applied Sciences Leiden
- Colours: purple, red and white
- Website: https://asopos.nl/
- Acronym: AV

Asopos de Vliet is a student rowing club based in Leiderdorp, Netherlands. It takes its membership primarily from Leiden University.

The female-only rowing club De Vliet was founded in 1905, taking its name after one of the waters in Leiden. In 1974 it merged with the male-only rowing club Asopos, named after the Greek river god Asopos). Asopos had been founded in 1962 by discontent members of the club Njord, nowadays a daughter association of Leiden's traditional fraternity/sorority (corps) Minerva.

== Trivia ==
Princess Beatrix of the Netherlands was a member of De Vliet when she studied in Leiden (1956 - 1961).
