= Dublin University Ladies Boat Club =

Irish rowing club

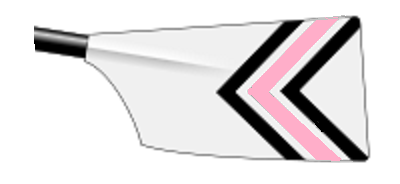
- Location: Islandbridge, Dublin, Ireland
- Coordinates: 53.345863°N 6.314757°W
- Home water: River Liffey
- Founded: 1975-76
- Affiliations: Rowing Ireland
- Website: www.dulbc.ie

Events
- Trinity Regatta Regatta

Dublin University Ladies Boat Club (DULBC) is a Competitive rowing sports club in Dublin, Ireland. It is the Ladies' Rowing club of Trinity College Dublin, often informally called "Trinity Ladies" rowing club. The club colours are black and pink with white 'TRINITY' lettering and a shield bearing the arms of Trinity College.

DULBC is affiliated with Rowing Ireland and is the sister club of Dublin University Boat Club (DUBC). DULBC share DUBC's Islandbridge Boathouse. Many experienced joiners have learned their trade at local clubs such as Commercial and Neptune.

The Ladies Boat Club uses the Trinity Boat House to store equipment and for training. This Boat House dates back to the beginning of the 20th century and is located just inside the surrounds of War Memorial Park at Islandbridge.

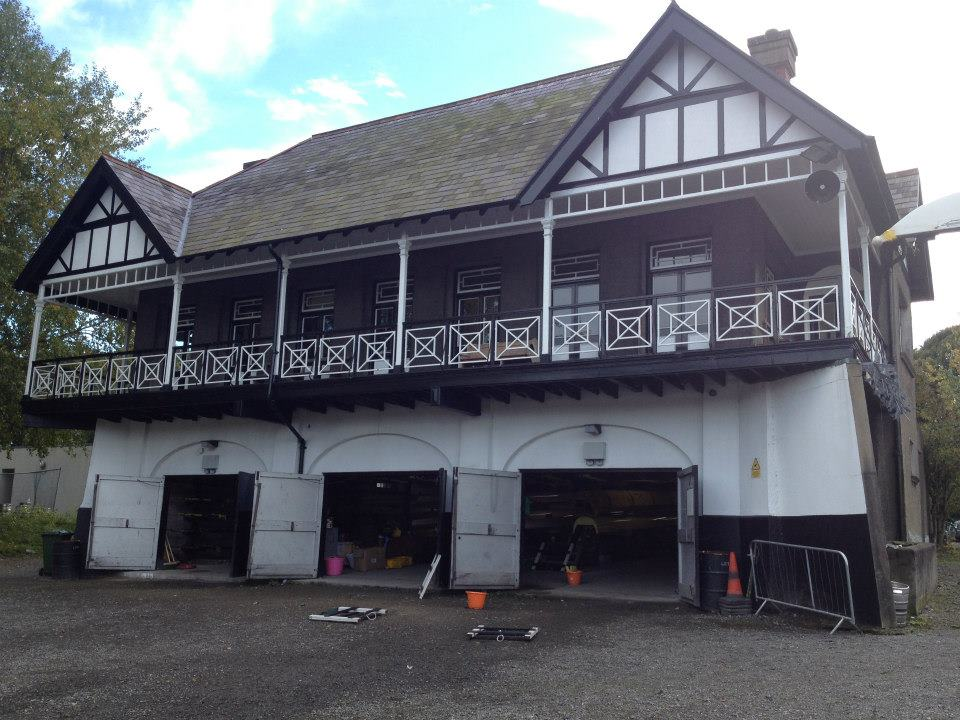
DUBC Boathouse in Islandbridge, Dublin

== History ==
In 1930, a group of undergraduate female rowers in Trinity requested permission to set up a rowing club. A supportive TCD news editorial at the time stated that rowing was an excellent sport and in every way suited to woman's physique. Unfortunately, they were unsuccessful and many joined outside clubs instead. A TCD women's rowing team did not appear until the 1960s. But it wasn't until 1975 that a formal decision was taken to "allow" women to row competitively for Trinity. David Sanfey was Captain of DUBC at the time and in 1976, the Dublin University Ladies Boat Club (DULBC) was formally established. The club's formation was driven by Jane Williams, who became the new Club’s first Captain.

The seventies and early eighties was an era when there was still some resistance to women's rowing within established clubs.

The first 'Colours Rowing Challenge' between UCD Women's Boat Club and DULBC took place in 1980. The so-called Corcoran Cup has taken place every year since.

== Achievements ==
By 1979, the club was competing internationally in coxed fours.

Several members of the club have represented Ireland at the very top level by competing in the World Championships including Nicole Ryan, Christine Caffey, Debbie Stack, Ailis Holohan and Ruth Doyle. Others, including Lorna Siggins, Shirley Roycroft, Anne Blaney, Mary O'Connor, Kate McCullough, Luise Ronayne, Nicola Fitz-Simon, Nessa Ronayne and Claire Magee, have competed for Ireland at the Homes International Regatta and the Coupe de la Jeunesse.

Trinity Ladies won the inaugural race of the Corcoran Cup 1980. By 2014, DULBC had won the Corcoran Cup 13 times.
