= Drummond and Smith College =

- University of New England
- Coordinates: 30.4998°S 151.6418°E
- Motto: Per Concordiam Animi Robur (Latin)
- Motto in English: Strength Through Unity
- Established: 1997
- Principal: Dr Edwina Ridgway OAM
- Undergraduates: ca. 200
- Postgraduates: ca. 5
- Website: www.une.edu.au/drummond-smith/

Drummond and Smith College, a residential college within the University of New England (Australia), is currently closed to new residents.

== History ==
Drummond and Smith College, a combination of the original Drummond College and SH Smith House, has had a long association with education in Armidale. When the Armidale Teachers’ College (ATC) was established in 1928 there was a need to provide accommodation for the women students and this was met by using Girrahween a building opposite Central Park, which had originally been constructed as a private boarding school for girls. In 1930 the residence was renamed after the then Director of Education in New South Wales, Stephen Henry Smith. S H Smith House remained as a residence for ATC until 1972, then continued as a residence for Armidale College of Advanced Education students until amalgamation with the university in 1989. When Smith House became co-ed in 1974 it housed 233 students in a complex of buildings.

During the period following amalgamation, the College Finance Officer was Ms Allison Rocks and the Head of Residence was Dr AW (Sandy) Scott. Drummond College was established as a College of the university in 1969 with 109 females and 44 males, with Dr Richard Bawden appointed as the first permanent head of the college in 1970. Drummond College operated throughout the 1970s until 1979 when the university withdrew it from student accommodation and used it primarily for conferences, also giving office space to the Financial Management Research Centre and The Regional Centre for Music and Drama.

Drummond is named after the late Hon. David Henry Drummond, a prominent State and Federal parliamentarian, and for almost 14 years, NSW Minister for Education. D H Drummond played a vital role in the establishment of the University of New England in the mid to late 1930s and is often referred to as the Father of the University of New England. The college was restored and reopened as a fully operational college in 1990. During most of this period from 1990 to 1996 Mrs Wallis Lenehan was the Secretary and Mr Mike Knowling was appointed the Principal.

Following a downturn in students requiring residential accommodation, the university decided in late 1996 to consolidate the residential colleges on the main campus and to generally reduce the number of beds in the residential system for 1997. One result of this decision was the amalgamation of Drummond College and S H Smith House to form the new entity Drummond and Smith College. This was located in the Drummond College buildings with Dr AW (Sandy) Scott as Principal.

== Crest and Motto ==
The S H Smith House crest has been in place above the front foyer of Girrahween since it was built in 1889. Why John Bliss, the builder, used the St Andrews Cross on a curved raised surface set on scroll-like background is not known. However, the origin of the motto is: in 1992 Maurice Kelly, a retired UNE classics scholar was asked to write a Latin phrase to encapsulate the ideas of good living, health, and learning. Salubritati et litteris studemus literally meaning “health and letters are our concern”, was his response. By way of contrast, Drummond College had its crest and motto devised by students in 1970. The motto Cognoscimus quo vivamus literally means “learning to live”, the idea coming from Isabelle Davidson.

The crest is based on a design by John Tilly. Briefly, the two Tudor roses of the Drummond College crest represent the two sexes in the college (it was a relatively new concept to have co-ed colleges in 1970); the red wavy lines are symbols from the Drummond family; and the book signifies learning and scholarship. Both the original College shields, carrying the crest and motto, were donated by final year students. They now hang in the college dining room.

== Some more recent events ==
Following a downturn in students requiring residential accommodation, the university decided in late 1996 to consolidate the residential colleges on the main campus and to generally reduce the number of beds in the residential system for 1997. One result of this decision was the amalgamation of Drummond College and S H Smith House to form the new entity Drummond and Smith College. This was located in the Drummond College buildings with Dr AW (Sandy) Scott as Principal and Ms Allison Rocks as Finance Officer. The shield for Drummond and Smith College was officially unveiled by Professor Michael Stoddart (DVC Academic) on 25 October 1997 following a design competition amongst students early in 1997. The wording for the motto was suggested as "through unity is strength" and was translated by Maurice Kelly, a retired UNE classics professor. He presented the college with the Latin Per concordiam animi robur literally meaning "through hearts in unison mind like the strength of oak" : Strength Through Unity. Many of the valued traditions and practices from the original Colleges are in action.

The links with the Drummond family and the annual D H Drummond Dinner continue, the Drummond Address in 1999 being given by the Director of the Australian Museum, Michael Archer. In 1997 both the Drummond Senior Common Room and the Fellows of S H Smith House combined and reconstituted themselves as The Fellows of Drummond and Smith College. In July 1999 Dr. Sandy Scott retired as head of Drummond and Smith College. Allison Rocks took on as The Acting Head until July, 2000 when the university appointed Edwina Ridgway as Principal of both Drummond & Smith and Duval Colleges. With a review of the total operation of both Colleges the new administrative entity in 2001 was moved to offer, through outsourced caterers, Eurest Australia, a combined 'Cafeteria' to provide supplementary food services under the direction of The Principal and a 'one-line' budget has been prepared to enable both Colleges to flourish in the future.

== List of College Principals ==
- 1997-1999 Dr A.W. (Sandy) Scott
- 1999-2000 Ms Allison Rocks (acting)
- 2000-2015 Dr Edwina Ridgway OAM
