= Kathleen Lumley College =

Coordinates: 34°54′36″S 138°36′18″E

- University of Adelaide
- Location: North Adelaide
- Motto: Strive to attain (Latin)
- Established: 1965
- Closed: 2022
- Gender: co-residential
- Residents: approx 80
- Website: Archived kathleenlumleycollege.com.au

Kathleen Lumley College was a co-residential college located in Lower North Adelaide, South Australia, and affiliated with the University of Adelaide. It provided accommodation for postgraduate students from any of the Institutions of higher learning in South Australia, as well as visiting academics and visitors to the State's cultural and research institutions. It closed in January 2022, as a result of the impact of the COVID-19 pandemic on the higher education sector.

== Facilities and History ==
The college had guest rooms with ensuite, sets (bedroom and study), as well as a number of two-room flats. The college was located a 15-minute walk from Adelaide's city centre, with a number of university playing fields outside its gates and within easy walking distance of shopping and dining spots. Each room was fully furnished, and the college provided a linen service for visitors. There were common entertainment, kitchen and laundry facilities (free-of-charge for residents and visitors). Breakfast and dinner were provided 6 days each week. Mondays through Thursdays, the menu was à la carte, with a wide range of dishes (including vegetarian fare). Formal dinners were held a number of times a year, and these were included in the residential costs, if the resident is on a six-month (24-week) or year-long (48-week) contract.

The college was founded in 1968 with funds donated by Kathleen Lumley. The RAIA Award-winning main building was designed in conjunction with the Union Building at the University of Adelaide by Neil Platten and Robert Dickson. The college was popular with international students, many of whom have gone on to prominent careers in teaching, diplomacy, public service and the private sector in their home countries. Country and interstate students were another prominent group in the college's community. Kathleen Lumley College has a number of elected Honorary and Research Fellows, as well as Research Associates, as part of its life. There were a limited number of Scholarships, Bursaries and other forms of financial support that long-term members of the college can apply for. The most recent of these has been the Cowan Grant Bursary, which emphasises support for students from the country.

== College Masters ==
Period	Details
1968 – 1979	John H. Coates
1980 – 2008	David L. Clements
2008 – 2018	Felix Patrikeeff
2018 – 2022	Lesa Scholl

== See also ==
- South Australian Association of University College Clubs

== 2024 - (Current) ==
As of 2024, the Kathleen Lumley College property continues to operate independently under new ownership. Staying true to the original Kathleen Lumley College guest room concept, the facility has continued to provide accommodation facilities primarily for but not limited to students, post graduates and academic visitors.
