= Dublin University Boat Club =

Irish rowing club

- Location: Islandbridge, Dublin, Ireland
- Coordinates: 53.345863°N 6.314757°W
- Home water: River Liffey
- Founded: 1836 (Pembroke Club); 1898 (Dublin University Boat Club)
- Affiliations: Rowing Ireland
- Website: www.duboatclub.com

Events
- Trinity Regatta

Dublin University Boat Club (DUBC) is the Rowing club of Trinity College Dublin. The club operates from its boat house at the Irish National War Memorial Gardens, Islandbridge, on the South Bank of the River Liffey. The club colours are black and white with a royal blue shield bearing the arms of Trinity College. The current Captain is Pearce Mooney.

== History ==
Dublin University Boat Club's beginnings can be found in the formation of the Pembroke Club in 1836. It was formed by University men and was primarily concerned with the rowing of small boats at Ringsend. In 1847, it was decided that the club membership be restricted to those with ties to the college; in doing so they amalgamated with the fledgling University Rowing Club to become the Dublin University Rowing Club. This club was the first Irish club to field a crew at Henley Royal Regatta. For the next 43 years, it was by far the most successful Irish rowing club.

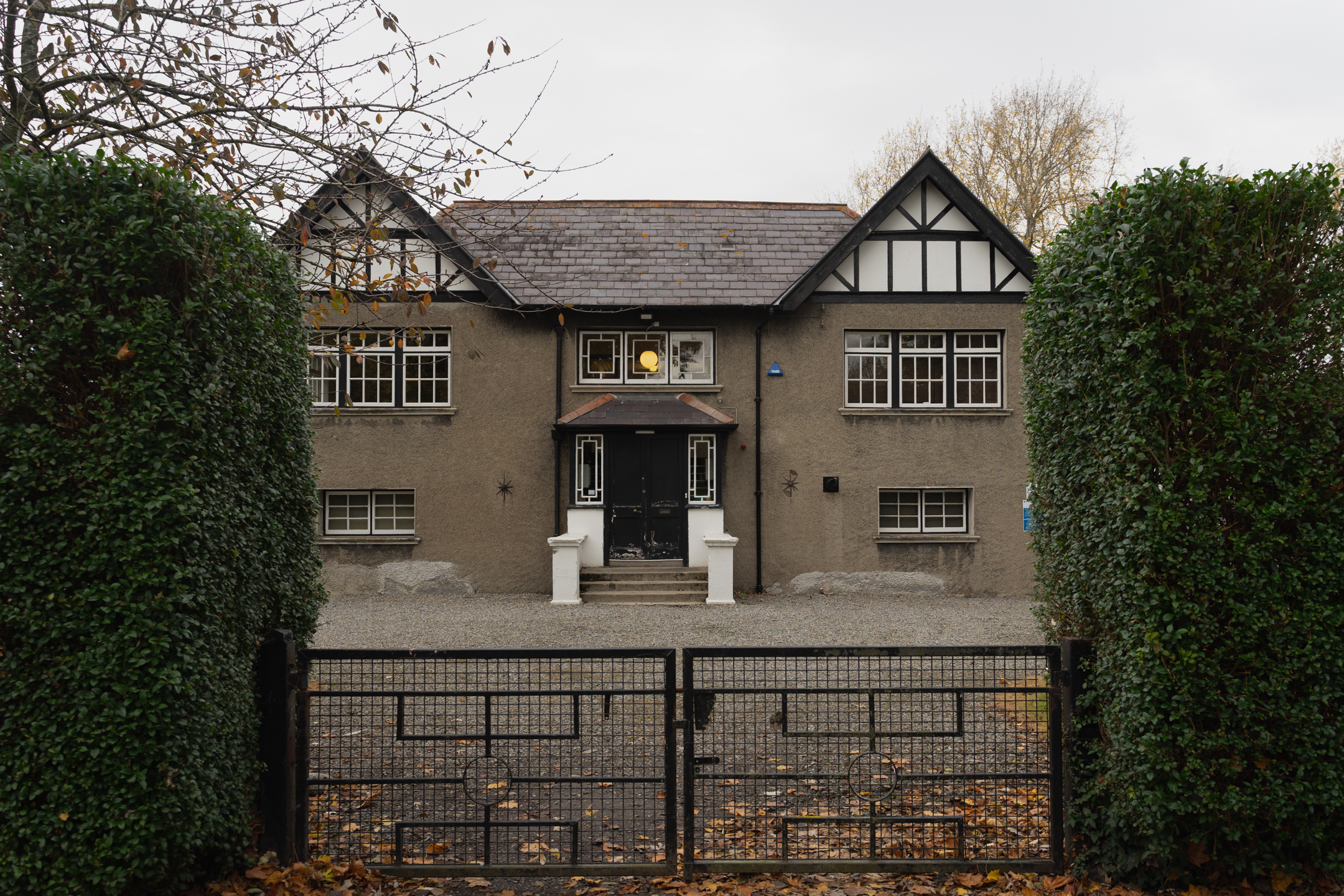
Exterior of the University's Boat Clubhouse.

1866 saw a split in the DURC and the formation of the Dublin University Boat Club. The next 32 years saw both win at Henley, and the majority of important Irish rowing trophies being shared between these two clubs. In 1898 old differences were put aside and the two clubs amalgamated under the name of the Boat Club. The familiar black and white hoops of the Trinity zephyr were retained from the boat club and adopted as the colours for the new club.

Since 1975, women's rowing at Trinity has been facilitated by DUBC's sister club, Dublin University Ladies Boat Club.

== Achievements ==
Since 1881, DUBC has won several titles, including seven wins at the Henley Royal Regatta; three Visitors Challenge Cups, the Ladies' Challenge Plate twice, the Wyfold Challenge Cup and the Thames Challenge Cup. Many of these victories were recorded in the 19th century. The most recent Henley victory for DUBC was in 1977. On the domestic scene, DUBC are surpassed by Neptune RC and others in terms of championship wins, however, with 25 victories in the IARU Senior Eight's Championships, the club holds more wins than any other. DUBC also has 28 victories in the Wylie Cup, the Irish University Championship. In the annual Gannon Cup match against University College Dublin Boat Club (UCDBC), the record is DUBC 36 wins to UCD's 30. DUBC also holds an 8-3 advantage over Queen's University Belfast, in the more recently established Lagan Construction Boat Race.

In 2015, DUBC became National Champions in the Men's Senior and Intermediate 8's, and holders of the Gannon Cup, Wylie Cup, Leander Trophy, and the Overseas Entrant Trophy for the London Head of the River.

== Trinity Access Programme Collaboration ==
In 2019, the Trinity Access Programme Rowing Summer Camp was established by Dublin University Boat Club (DUBC) and Dublin University Ladies Boat Club (DULBC) in collaboration with the Trinity Access Programme (TAP). This programme introduces 4th and 5th-year students to the academic and sporting life at Trinity College Dublin by teaching them to row at the historic Islandbridge Boathouse.

The camp runs throughout June, with each week-long session accommodating 10 students. The small group size ensures focused one-on-one training and a meaningful mentoring experience. Annually, around 50 students participate in the camps.

The programme begins at the Trinity Sport Centre, where students are introduced to rowing and informed about the support systems available at Trinity, including the TAP foundation course, HEAR, DARE, and SUSI. The camp then moves to the Islandbridge Boathouse for on-water training.

The camp is named in honour of Trinity alumnus Rob Van Mesdag, a former Olympic rower and bronze medalist at the European Championships. Van Mesdag provided initial funding for the TAP Rowing Camps and was a strong supporter of Trinity’s rowing and sports initiatives until his passing in 2018. His legacy lives on through the students who benefit from the camp named in his honour.

== Honours ==
=== Henley Royal Regatta ===
Year	Races won
1870	Visitors' Challenge Cup
1873	Visitors' Challenge Cup
1874	Visitors' Challenge Cup
1875	Ladies' Challenge Plate
1881	Wyfold Challenge Cup
1903	Thames Challenge Cup
1977	Ladies' Challenge Plate

== See Also ==
- Dublin University Ladies Boat Club
