= Sister college =

System of associating colleges in different countries with one another

In some countries, certain universities have a formal tradition of pairing their residential colleges or houses with one another. Colleges that are paired are referred to as sister colleges, and have an academic, ceremonial, and symbolic relation to each other. Some notable pairs include:

- Harvard University and Yale University
- University of Oxford, University of Cambridge, and University of Dublin
- University of York and Durham University

Students belonging to one college can often find accommodation and hospitality at their sister college should they be visiting the other university; this is especially relevant to Harvard and Yale students during the annual Harvard-Yale football rivalry. The universities of Oxford, Cambridge, and Dublin have similarly maintained an academic relationship for several centuries.

== Ireland ==
Secondary schools in Ireland which are run by the same religious order are often referred to as "sister colleges" and enjoy a privileged relationship with one another. For example, the Jesuit Belvedere College and Clongowes Wood College are sister colleges, as are the Spiritan Blackrock College and St. Michael's College, Dublin.

== See also ==
- Harvard-Yale sister colleges
- List of Oxbridge sister colleges
- Seven Sisters (colleges), a group of American women's colleges
- List of coordinate colleges
