= National Association of Australian University Colleges =

National Association of Australian University Colleges (NAAUC)
- Location: Various
- Full name: The National Association of Australian University Colleges
- Established: 1967
- President: Kiona Fry

The National Association of Australian University Colleges Inc (NAAUC) is the peak representative body for students living on Australian tertiary campuses. As a non-profit association, NAAUC aims to coordinate communication between a network of residences on a national scale, foster goodwill amongst association members, and liaise with college heads and administration in order to provide the best possible advice and referral to Australian colleges, residential halls of residences and student villages.

== History ==
NAAUC was founded during a small gathering of College Club Presidents and Senior Students at an Intercollegiate Conference held in Canberra in 1967. The goal was to provide a forum for tertiary leaders living on campus, and the cause didn't stop there.

== Aims ==
The aims of the Association were established in 1968:

- To co-ordinate, on a national scale, a network of communications between members of the Association
- To implement a system of liaison with heads of college in order to further the interests of member colleges and halls
- To foster goodwill and understanding between members of the Association
- To promote the efficient administration of college, hall and residential associations throughout the country
- To provide colleges with information regarding pertinent issues
- To develop and enable professionalism within college student bodies
- To lead the development of colleges

== The Executive ==
An executive of nine members are chosen by member residences each year to co-ordinate the activities and provide direction to the association for the following year.

The positions are President, Vice-President (Development), Vice-President (Engagement), Treasurer, Secretary, Academic Director, Creative Director, Conference Directors and Immediate Past Executive. A team of State Representatives and Working Party also supports the Executive Committee.

The Current (2026) Executive is:

- President: Kiona Fry (University Hall, University of Western Australia)
- Vice-President (Development): Lucy Crockett
- Vice-President (Engagement): Sharon Anthony (St Hilda's College, University of Melbourne)
- Secretary: Chelsea White (St Thomas More College, University of Western Australia)
- Treasurer: Zoe Price (Sancta Sophia College, University of Sydney)
- Academic Director: Matthew Callaghan (John XXIII College, Australian National University)
- Creative Director: Cate Atkinson (Grace College, University of Queensland)
- Conference Director: Jed Hera-Singh (Emmanuel College, University of Queensland)
- Immediate Past President: Abbey Miller (St Hilda's College, University of Melbourne)

== Annual Conference ==
The association holds an annual conference for its members and involves a program of various activities all with relevance to on-campus residential living. At each year's Conference, several colleges present bids in competition to host the conference in their city the following year. The program typically includes;

=== Workshops ===
- Conflict Resolution
- Event Planning
- Effective Changeover and Strategic Planning
- Addiction, Drugs and Alcohol
- Mental Wellness on Res
- Cultivating Communities
- Residential Relationships
- Responsibilities of an Office Bearer

=== Role Development Seminars ===
The NAAUC Conference has a vast alumnus of veteran college leaders to encourage and aid future leaders. The Role Development Seminars are a key tool in passing information to prospective office seekers and in sharing lessons learned - the hard way - from other colleges. These sessions outline what prospective student leaders should do in preparation for appointment, what sort of commitment various positions involve and issues they should consider upon successful appointment. Seminars are presented in the areas of student club President and Vice-President, Secretary, Treasurer, Social Officer and Residential Advisor.

=== Community service ===
One of the more recent additions to the conference program has been a community service outing. These outings have included day-long trips to areas outside host cities to survey and work on damaged land and vegetation. In 2005 the conference delegation planted more than 2000 tube stock native plants at a 93-hectare site in the Galada Tamboore Reserve in outer Melbourne.

=== Parliamentary Debating ===
The model debate gives delegates the opportunity to argue positions on contentious college issues in an educational format. The debate is usually held at the host city's parliament house.

=== Social Events ===
The annual conference features a structured social program comprising recurring events—such as the Merch-Swap, Charity Auction, Opening Dinner, and Welcome to Country—alongside newer additions like the NAAUC Runway and Charity Fair. Program offerings are designed around college inclusiveness and engagement, complemented by off-site excursions to city landmarks and regional attractions, historical sites, and sporting events. The schedule concludes with in-house functions and a formal black-tie ball at the end of the conference week.

== State associations ==
=== South Australia ===
The South Australian Association of University College Clubs (SAAUCC) is an association of the five undergraduate residential colleges located in Adelaide, South Australia. The college clubs involved are Aquinas College, Flinders University Hall, Lincoln College, St. Ann's College and St. Mark's College. Its primary function is to organise and stage sporting contests between the five colleges, especially for the Douglas Irving Cup, as well as inter-college social events. It is also responsible for intercollege-relations and discipline.

The independent Lutheran Seminary is not currently a member of SAAUCC.

The representative body for SAAUCC is the SAAUCC committee. Each individual college committee's President and two Sports Secretaries are automatically elected to the SAAUCC committee. In addition, each college may elect a further member from their community (not necessarily from their College Club Committee).

== Past Presidents ==
- 2025 - Abbey Miller (St Hilda's College)
- 2024 - Lilli Anderson (Women's College)
- 2023 - Evelyn Unwin Tew (Christ College)
- 2022 - Jack Agnew (Lincoln College)
- 2021 - Georgia Hayward (Women's College)
- 2020 - Adrian Oats (St Hilda's College)
- 2019 - Jonty Boshier (Robert Menzies College)
- 2018 - Joshua Carter (Basser College)
- 2017 - Lachlan Power (Cromwell College)
- 2016 - Alice Draffin (Mannix College)

== Past conferences ==
- 2025 - The Women's College, The University of Queensland (Brisbane).
- 2024 - Dunmore Lang College, Macquarie University (Sydney).
- 2023 - Ormond College, The University of Melbourne (Melbourne).
- 2022 - St John's College, University of Queensland (Brisbane).
- 2021 - Ormond College, The University of Melbourne (Melbourne) and Grace College, University of Queensland (Brisbane).
- 2020 - St Hilda's College, University of Melbourne (Melbourne) and King's College, University of Queensland (Brisbane).
- 2019 - International House, The University of Melbourne (Melbourne).
- 2018 - Cromwell College, University of Queensland (Brisbane).
- 2017 - Mannix College, Monash University (Melbourne).
- 2016 - Dunmore Lang College and Robert Menzies College, Macquarie University (Sydney).
- 2015 - King's College and St John's College, University of Queensland (Brisbane).
- 2014 - Ormond College, Queens College and St Hilda's College, The University of Melbourne (Melbourne).
- 2013 - The Women's College and St Leo's College, University of Queensland (Brisbane).
- 2012 - Dunmore Lang College, Macquarie University (Sydney).
- 2011 - Colleges of the University of Melbourne (Melbourne).
- 2010 - Colleges of the University of Queensland (Brisbane).
- 2009 - St Andrews's College, University of Sydney (Sydney).
- 2008 - Trinity College, the University of Western Australia (Perth)
- 2007 - Mannix College, Monash University (Melbourne)
- 2006 - King's College & Emmanuel College, The University of Queensland (Brisbane)
- 2005 - Ormond College & Queen's College, The University of Melbourne (Melbourne)
- 2004 - Trinity, the University of Western Australia (Perth)
- 2003 - Mannix College, Monash University (Melbourne)
- 2002 - John XXIII College & Burgmann College, Australian National University (Canberra)
- 2001 – Ormond, Queens and St Hilda's College, The University of Melbourne (Melbourne)
- 2000 – St Columba and St Thomas More College, University of Western Australia (Perth)
- 1999 – Deakin University Residences, Deakin University (Geelong)
- 1998 - Gatton College, University of Queensland (Gatton)
- 1997 - Kensington College, University of New South Wales (Sydney)
- 1996 - The Terraces, La Trobe University (Bendigo)
- 1995 - Christ College, University of Tasmania (Hobart)
- 1994 - Earle Page College, University of New England (Armidale)
- 1993 - Currie Hall, University of Western Australia (Perth)
- 1992 - Queen's College, The University of Melbourne (Melbourne)
- 1991 - Emmanuel College, University of Queensland (Brisbane)
- 1990 - Jane Franklin Hall, University of Tasmania (Hobart)
- 1989 - St. Mark's College, James Cook University (Townsville)
- 1988 - St. Mark's College, University of Adelaide (Adelaide)
- 1987 - St. John's College, University of Sydney (Sydney)
- 1986 - The Women's College, University of Sydney (Sydney)
- 1985 - St. Columba College, University of Western Australia (Perth)
- 1984 - International House, The University of Melbourne (Melbourne)

== COVID-19 ==
During the COVID-19 crisis, the NAAUC team has strived to provide resources and support for communities that have taken heavy hits to their social and financial activities. In April 2020, the organisation published a handbook to assist student leaders in the continuation of community activities whilst under government restrictions and physical distancing measures.
