= Robert H. Parker =

Robert H. Parker may refer to:

- R. Hunt Parker (1892–1969), American jurist
- Robert Henry Parker (1932–2016), British accounting scholar
