= St Ann's College =

College in North Adelaide, South Australia

Coordinates: 34°54′36″S 138°36′03″E

- University of Adelaide
- Location: North Adelaide
- Full name: St Ann's College Inc.
- Motto: Per Litteras Lumen (Latin)
- Motto in English: Illumination through Learning
- Established: 1947
- Named for: Ann Wilcox
- Gender: Co-residential
- Principal: Wendy Fleming
- Website: stannscollege.edu.au

St Ann's College is a co-residential college in North Adelaide, South Australia. In its early decades, the college had only female boarders, but later took students of either gender. Members of the college attend three universities in South Australia, University of Adelaide, the University of South Australia, and Flinders University. St Ann's College is privately owned and run as a not-for-profit, and is not funded by government, church or university.

== History ==
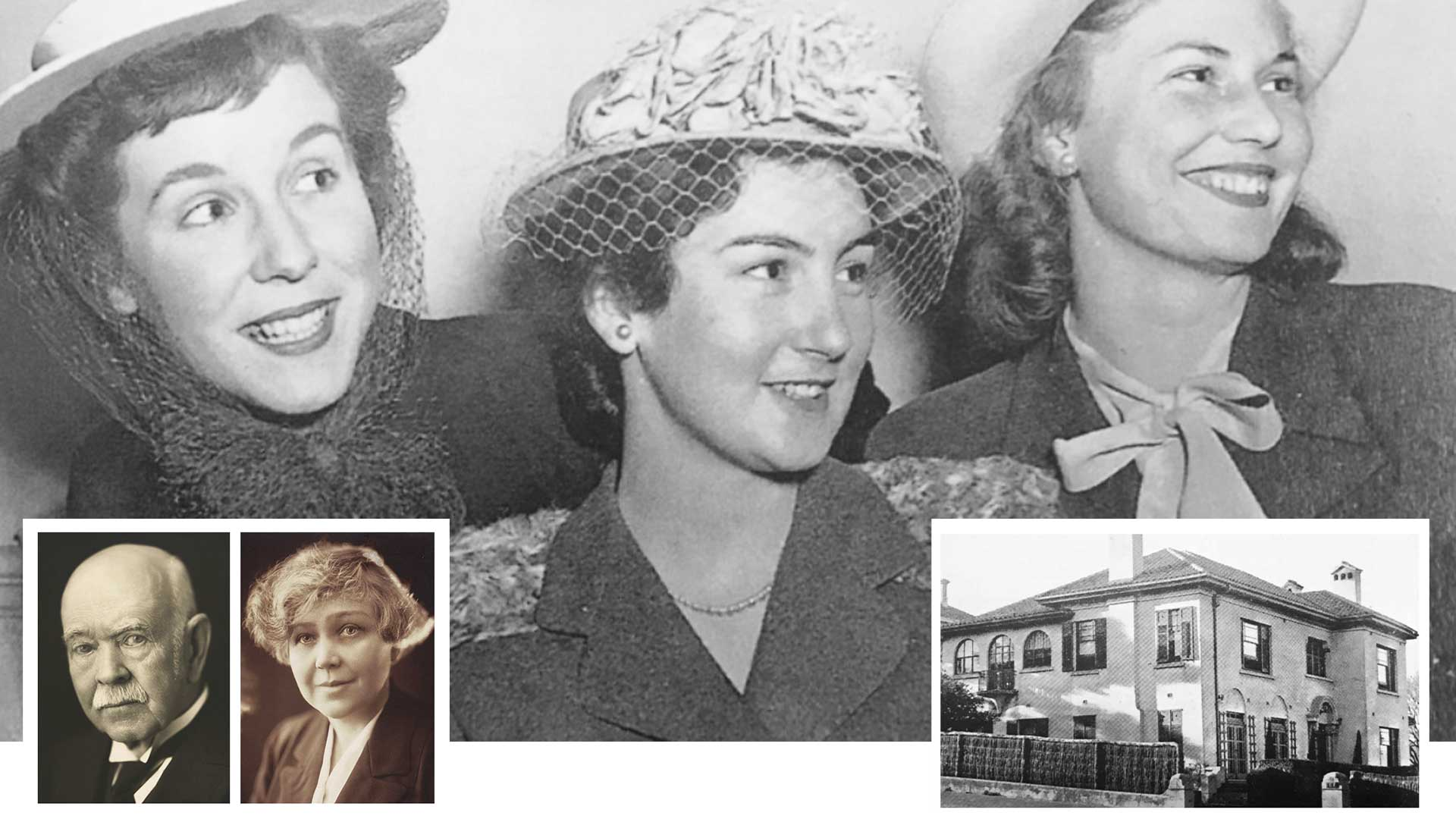
St Ann's College, Adelaide, founded in 1947. Sidney Wilcox (1866–1942) bequeathed his house on Brougham Place, North Adelaide, (seen lower far right) to the university for residential accommodation for female students

In 1924, lawyer and politician Sir Josiah Symon suggested South Australia should have a women’s college to ensure women who have been admitted to the University of Adelaide are given somewhere to live. By the 1930s a group of women graduates of the University of Adelaide, notably Violet Plummer, Helen Mayo, Constance Finlayson, and Pauline Grenfell Price, began lobbying for an equivalent of the male-only residential St Mark's College to accommodate female students from the country and interstate. They approached Sidney Wilcox (1866–1942) of the woolbroking firm Wilcox, Mofflin, who donated £5000 and bequeathed his house on Brougham Place, North Adelaide, to the university for such a facility.

St. Ann's College was officially opened with 16 residential students in 1947, much of the delay being attributable to World War II. It was named for Ann Wilcox, mother of Sidney Wilcox, donor of the first building.

As of 2007 the college housed 197 tertiary students, both sexes, in single rooms. Rooms in the new buildings have ensuites, and all rooms have air conditioning. Residents at St Ann's College have a diverse background with most coming from either rural Australia or overseas.

== Governance and description ==
The college council, along with the executive and finance committee, form the governing body. There is a chair, 13 governors and two ex officio members.

As of 2024 the principal and CEO is Wendy Fleming.

The Latin motto is Per Litteras Lumen, meaning "light through letters" or "Illumination through Learning".

== Tutors ==
=== Residential advisors ===
St Ann's has twelve residential advisors, each in charge of a corridor consisting of approximately 18 students. The RAs provide academic and social leadership, and pastoral care. Each year a senior residential advisor is appointed, usually a RA from the previous year who has re-applied to be a residential advisor. They coordinate the RA group and take a leadership role within the college.

=== Academic tutors ===
Each year senior students are selected into various academic positions for the purpose of tutoring lower year levels in any difficulty they are having.

== College Club ==
The college social and sporting events are organised by the St Ann's College Club, which consists of members elected exclusively by college students. The college club consists of the following positions:

- President
- Vice-President
- Treasurer
- Secretary
- SAAUCC Representative
- Social Secretary
- Sport Secretary (two are elected, usually 1 male and 1 female)
- General Representatives (two are elected)
- Technology Representative
- First Year Representative

== College sport ==
St Ann's College competes against Aquinas College, Lincoln College, Flinders University Hall and St. Mark's College for the Douglas Irving Cup (known to the students as the High Table Cup). Sports that count for cup points include:

- Tennis
- Swimming
- Basketball
- Debating
- Football (Australian Rules)
- Netball
- Football (Soccer)
- Table tennis
- Hockey
- Volleyball
- Athletics

The college also competes in a Battle of the Bands competition which does not contribute to High Table Cup points. Furthermore, St Ann's College also competes against Aquinas College in cricket.
