= St. Mark's College (University of Adelaide) =

Co-residential college of the University of Adelaide, South Australia

St Mark's College
- The University of Adelaide
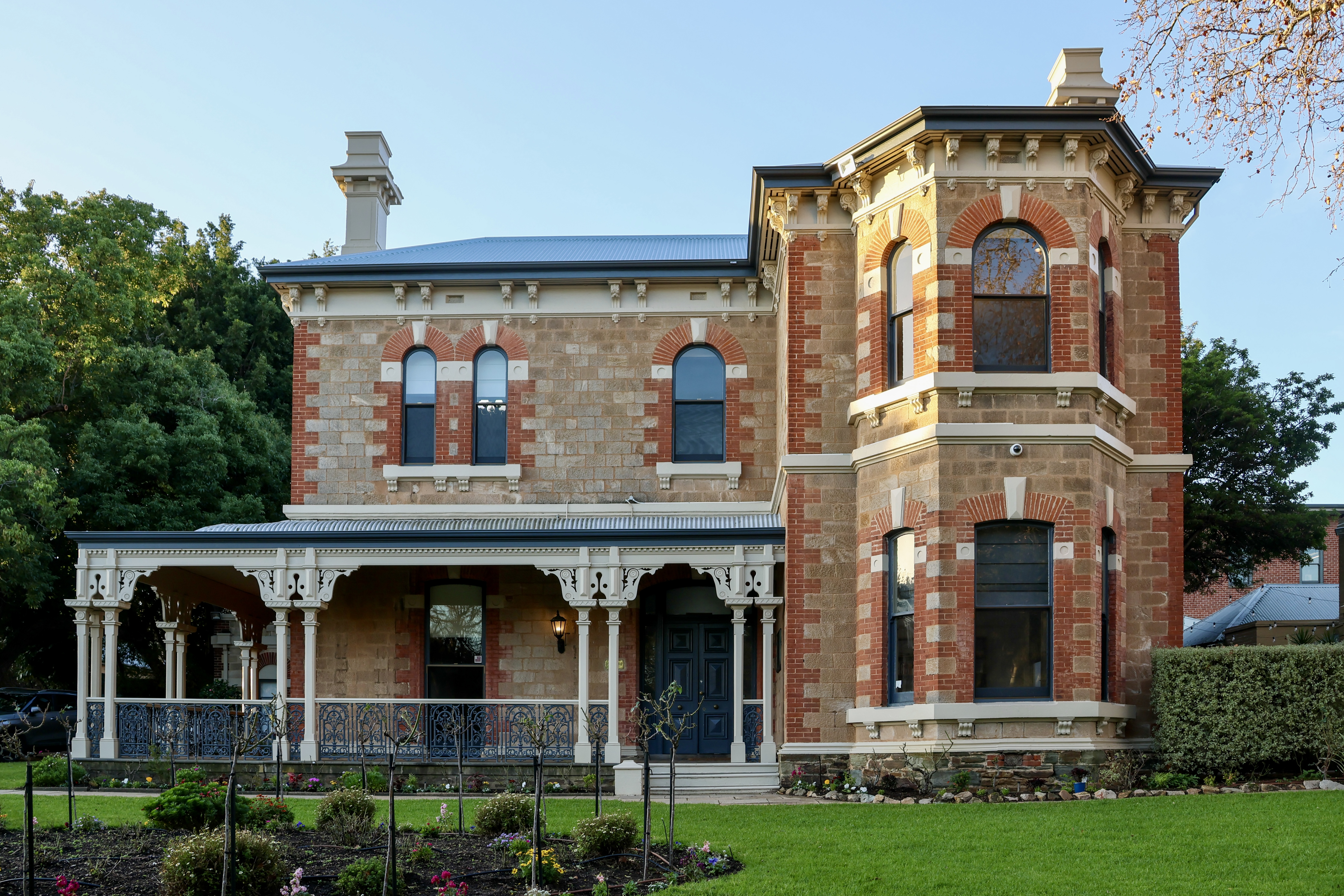
- The college as seen from Pennington Terrace
- Location: North Adelaide
- Coordinates: 34°54′46″S 138°35′52″E
- Motto: Spernit Virtus Humum (Latin)
- Motto in English: Excellence Reaches for the Stars (lit. Excellence spurns the dry earth)
- Established: 1925
- Named for: Mark the Evangelist
- Gender: Co-educational since 1982
- Head: Donald Markwell
- Residents: 245
- Website: stmarkscollege.com.au

St Mark's College is an Australian university co-residential college in North Adelaide, South Australia. Founded in 1925, it is affiliated with the Anglican Church of Australia. It is the oldest residential college in South Australia and is associated with the University of Adelaide, the University of South Australia and Flinders University. Located next to St Peter's Cathedral on Pennington Terrace, the college houses 245 tertiary students in both dormitory and apartment accommodation.

== History ==
=== Foundation and opening ===
The foundation of St Mark's College was driven by the demand for student accommodation, which the University of Adelaide did not provide at the time. The founders of the university believed that learning thrives best on 'haggis in a hovel', and that consequently there was no necessity for the provision of residence or its official control. It was thought that students should receive no tutorial assistance but rather sink or swim on a few lectures from their professors each week. The Reverend Julian Bickersteth led the drive to establish a residential college, with the Anglican Synod of the Diocese of Adelaide appointing a committee to that end in September 1920.

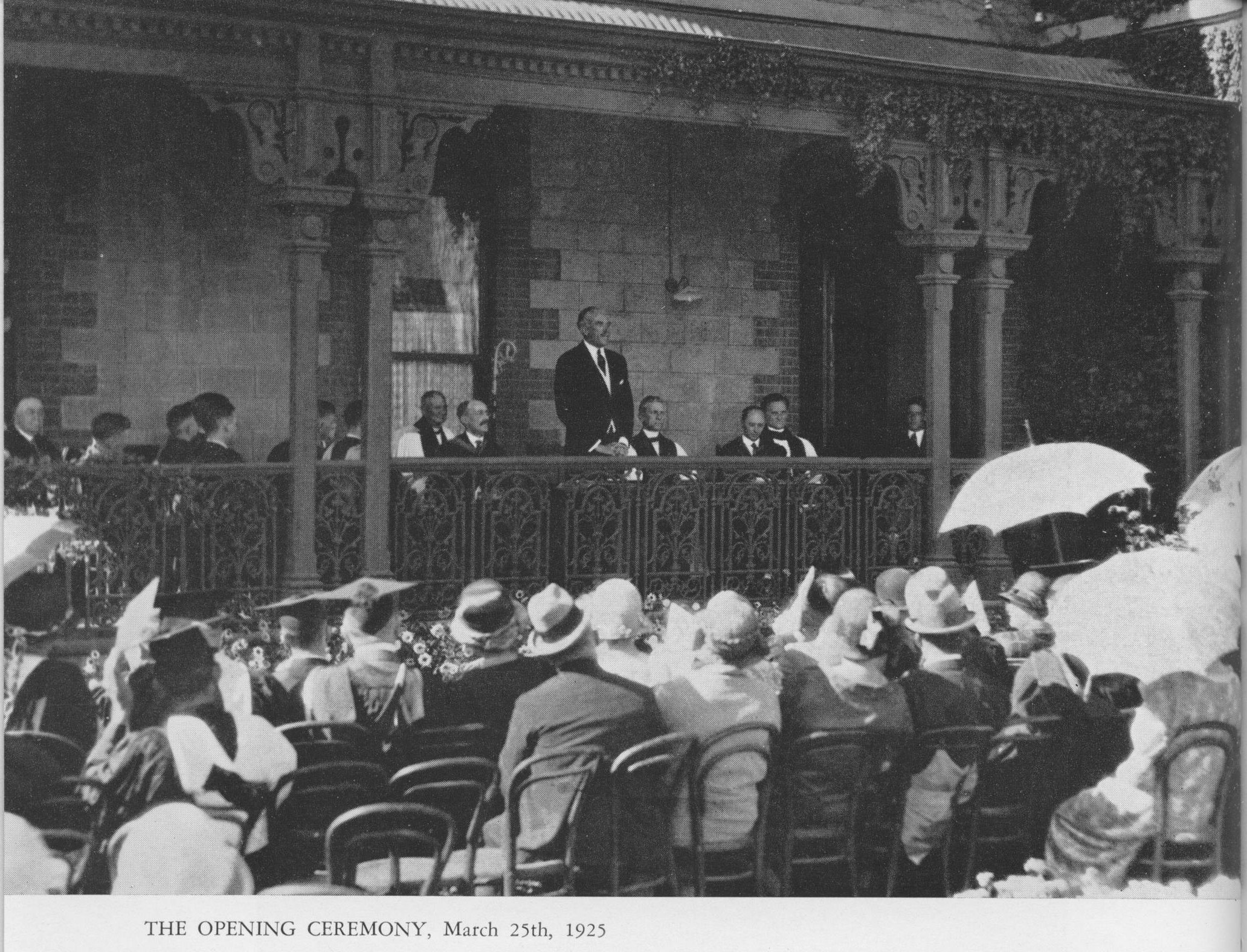
St Mark's opening ceremony, 25 March 1925

Early in December 1921, a meeting of the provisional committee was held at St Peter's College. Negotiation for a site for the college began in 1922. By the end of the year, H. W. Hodgetts secured options to purchase, for about £10,000, the historic residence of Sir John Downer at Pennington Terrace, North Adelaide, together with the adjoining land on Kermode Street, a horse paddock and some old cottages. This, with the subsequent purchase of neighbouring houses and land, gave room for a college of up to 150 students. While the proposed constitution fully safeguarded the Anglican character of the institution, it admitted a number of non-Anglicans to the council and opened the college freely to men of all faiths.

Progress was very slow during 1923 and 1924. The funds which had purchased the property would not also suffice to open the college. Realising that the small funds available prohibited any building, the council instructed the architect, Walter Bagot, to adapt the Downer House to accommodate a single, or temporarily detached married Master; twelve tutors and students; a cook-housekeeper garlanded with the title of Matron, and two or three maids. In December the committee considered some forty Australian and New Zealand applications for the Mastership, together with some forty English names forwarded to them by Sir Francis Wylie of the Rhodes Trust. They announced the mastership of St Mark's was to be Sir Grenfell Price on 17 December.

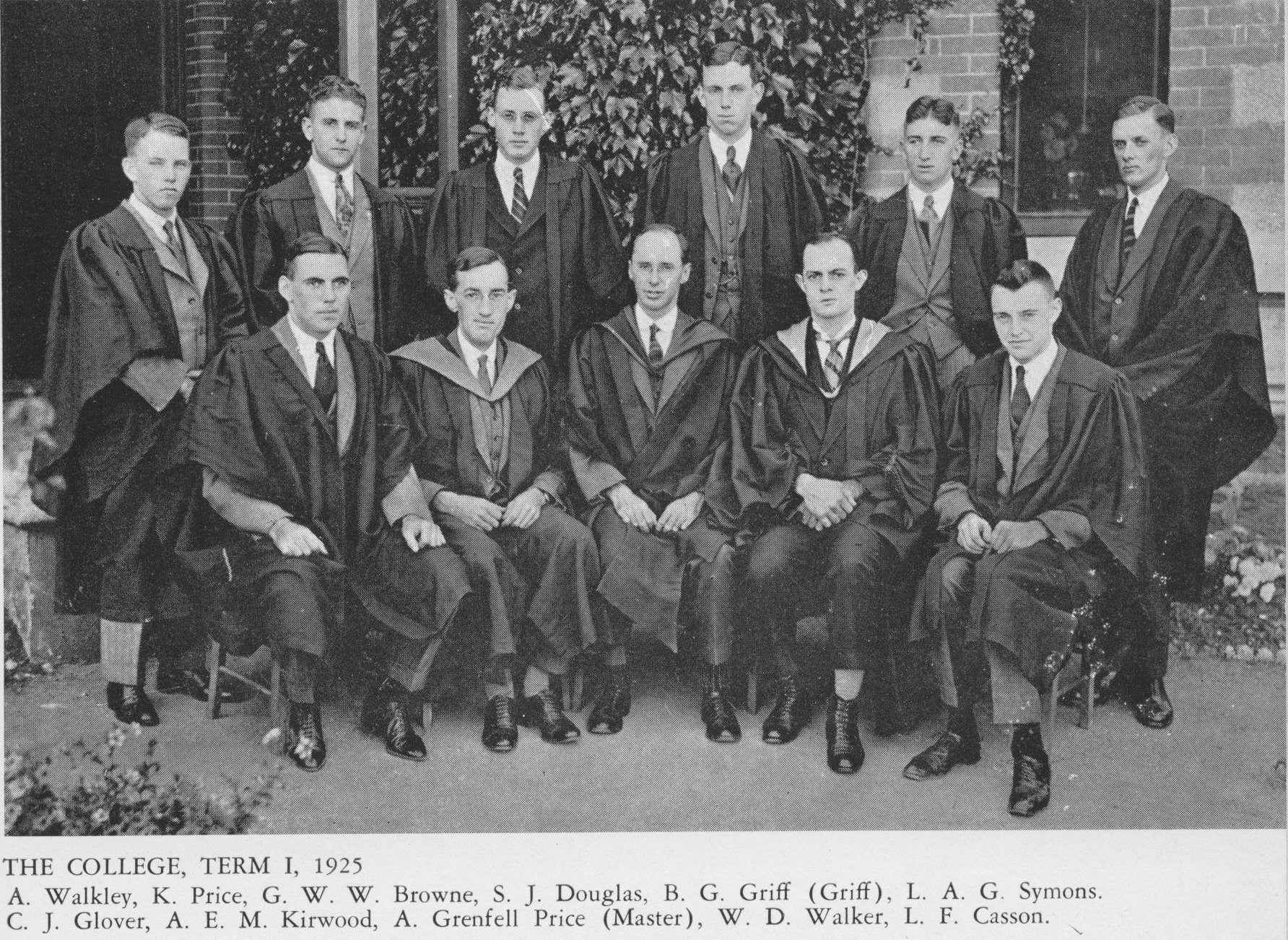
St Mark's College, Term 1, 1925

The name of the college was the subject of some debate. Initially it was to be called Christ's College, but a movement soon developed for the name to be changed to King's. A compromise was reached to name the college St Mark's, after the saint on whose day the ANZAC landing at Gallipoli took place. The university council approved the affiliation of St Mark's, the first college of the university, on 31 October 1924.

Decision were made about the drinking of alcohol at the college. The founders wished the college to avoid the occasional drinking orgies which they had seen in Oxford and Cambridge and asked the bishop to support a compromise which would make the college damp rather than either wet or dry. Under this arrangement the council would grant the students access to beer and light wines in regulated quantities, but spirits were rigidly excluded.

Early in March 1925, the first council was elected a few days before the college opened. By 25 March the founders had entries from a resident tutor, A. E. M. Kirwood, a university lecturer in English, and nine students, L. A. G. Symons, A. Walkley, Kells Price, S. J. Douglas, B. Griff, L. F. Casson, W. D. Walker, C. J. Glover and G. W. W. Browne. The college was opened by the governor, Lieutenant-General Sir Tom Bridges, and blessed by Bishop Nutter Thomas. The college's coat of arms and colours also date from the first year.

=== Establishment ===
During the initial years accommodation and equipment were severely lacking due to shortage of funds and labour costs being extremely high before the depression. This brought on a continuous growth policy by piecemeal extensions, where the purchase of land and development of buildings was initiated when the college could afford it. The first stage of "New Wing" (Newland Building) was opened in 1926, and a second in 1927.

From the outset the council placed a great emphasis on building up a resident and non-resident tutorial system; this emphasis has created a framework which is still in practice today. Scholarships and bursaries were also initiated early on to aid clever or needy students. The college also developed its societies and sporting culture early on. As early as 1928 a college "Wranglers' Club" was established to conduct debates and entertain distinguished guests. The college, as well as competing in the university games and societies of the time, also held internal games and sports as Intra-College sport did not exist. In 1934, St Mark's hosted the first inter-collegiate football match in South Australia, defeating Trinity College, Melbourne.

In 1939 the college seemed set for a period of steady if unspectacular advance in service to the community and more immediately to the university, when the Second World War intervened and was followed by an almost complete revaluation and reorganization of University life.

=== War, recovery and growth ===
In December 1940, the college was leased to the RAAF for the duration of the war. The remaining students were relocated to a lodging house in Kermode Street. During their tenancy, the RAAF made several improvements to the buildings which were subsequently purchased by the college.

Following the conclusion of the war, the college re-opened on 10 March 1946. A steady growth in numbers necessitated the purchase and rental of additional properties. In 1949, "North House" in Kermode Street was purchased, and "Montefiore" (which later became Aquinas College) was rented. The first stage of "Memorial Building", the second of the college's dormitory buildings, was completed in 1952. A new dining hall and library was built in 1961, two cottages on the western boundary (nicknamed Cain and Abel) were purchased in 1962, and couple of row houses on the east were purchased in 1963. An anonymous donation allowed the college to purchase the heritage listed Hawker House in 1970, completing the college's present extent.

=== 1980–present ===
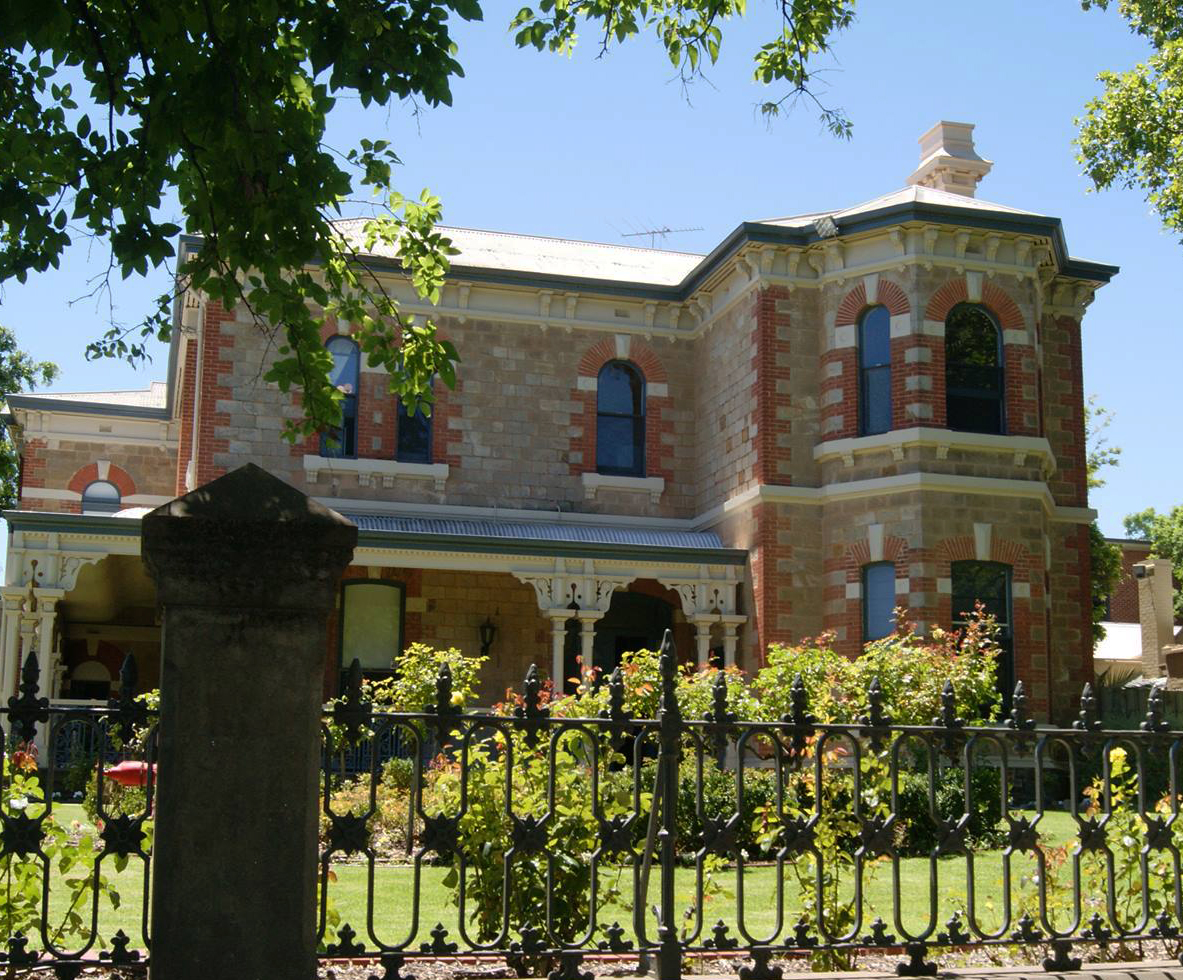
St Mark's College, 2017.

Women were first admitted to the college in 1982.

St Mark's spent the closing years of the 20th century moving towards the completion of its strategic building masterplan, aiming to eventually house a maximum of 250 students. In 1984, the Creswell Flats were renovated. In 1988, a computer room was established and in 1989, the "Hawker annexe" was renovated to provide additional accommodation. In 1996, a block of flat-style accommodation was erected on the northwestern corner of the college, named New Cain. The old cottages Cain and Abel were demolished in 2001 to make way for the New Abel extension, which opened in 2002. This complex was extended in 2007 to encompass the Lewis Building, and two new wings named the Mathieson and Wall buildings. In 2004 the Allister McLeod Sports Pavilion, a 24-hour gym, was built on the eastern side of the tennis courts. In 2015 this was incorporated into the East Wing Building, which also included two floors of student accommodation, an academic centre, and a new multi-level resident car park.

In 2018, multiple media networks reported allegations of hazing, involving sexual misconduct, at the college as part of a nation-wide investigation into university residential college culture. In response, St Mark's launched an internal investigation, and subsequently implemented an "Action Plan for Cultural Renewal"., which has included significant reform of governance and accountability structures within the college, and the establishment, or significant strengthening, of educational and training programs for student leaders.

In 2020 a member of St Mark's College, James Muecke, who was in residence from 1982 to 1987, was bestowed with the honour of Australian of the Year for 2020. Owing to the generosity of honorary fellow Ian Wall and Pamela Wall, the college also commenced work to add an extra two levels to the college carpark. Due to be completed in September 2020, this will increase the total number of parking spaces from 98 to 158.

== College master and leadership ==
Appointed	Retired	Name
1925	1956	Sir Archibald Grenfell Price
1957	1967	Robert Brook Lewis
1968	1978	The Reverend Malcolm McKenzie
1978	1982	Peter Geoffrey Edwards
1983	1990	The Reverend Peter Thomson
1991	1999	Robin Ashwin
2000	2007	The Honourable John Charles Bannon
2008	2019	Rose Alwyn
2019		Donald Markwell

The college has three administrative bodies; they are the board, the staff and the student leadership team. The board of St Mark's is made up of professionals who are responsible for overseeing the college’s strategic direction, plans, and performance. The current chair of the board is Linda Matthews. St Mark’s is led by the head of college, currently Donald Markwell, who is the academic and executive head of the college. The head of college works closely with the dean, currently Peter Tregear, director of learning, currently Rachel Buxton, and professional staff to ensure the smooth day-to-day running of the college.

The student leadership team consists of three teams: the Residential Advisor team, the Academic Team, and the College Club Committee. These students leaders help support their peers and promote a safe, respectful and inclusive values-based culture. Each team has different responsibilities within the college, but they work together in close consultation with staff. The Residential Advisor team is led by the Assistant Deans. Within the college each accommodation floor as well as Hawker House and the Flats have a designated Residential Advisor. This is a senior student who receives further training to act as a key support person and mentor for all students on the floor. This team is accountable to the dean. Members of this team are appointed by the college. The Academic Team is led by the senior academic tutors and consists of eight academic coordinators, who are responsible for supporting students in their faculty and coordinating the 45+ academic tutors employed by the college. The Academic Team is accountable to the director of learning. Members of this team are appointed by the college. The College Club Committee is an elected student representative body and is responsible for organising a wide range of sporting, arts, cultural, environmental, charitable and social events throughout the year, as well as coordinating inter-college events with other college clubs in Adelaide and around Australia. All undergraduate residents of the college are members of the College Club (or "Junior Common Room"). The College Club Committee work with college staff and other student leaders to promote a positive campus culture.

== Campus ==
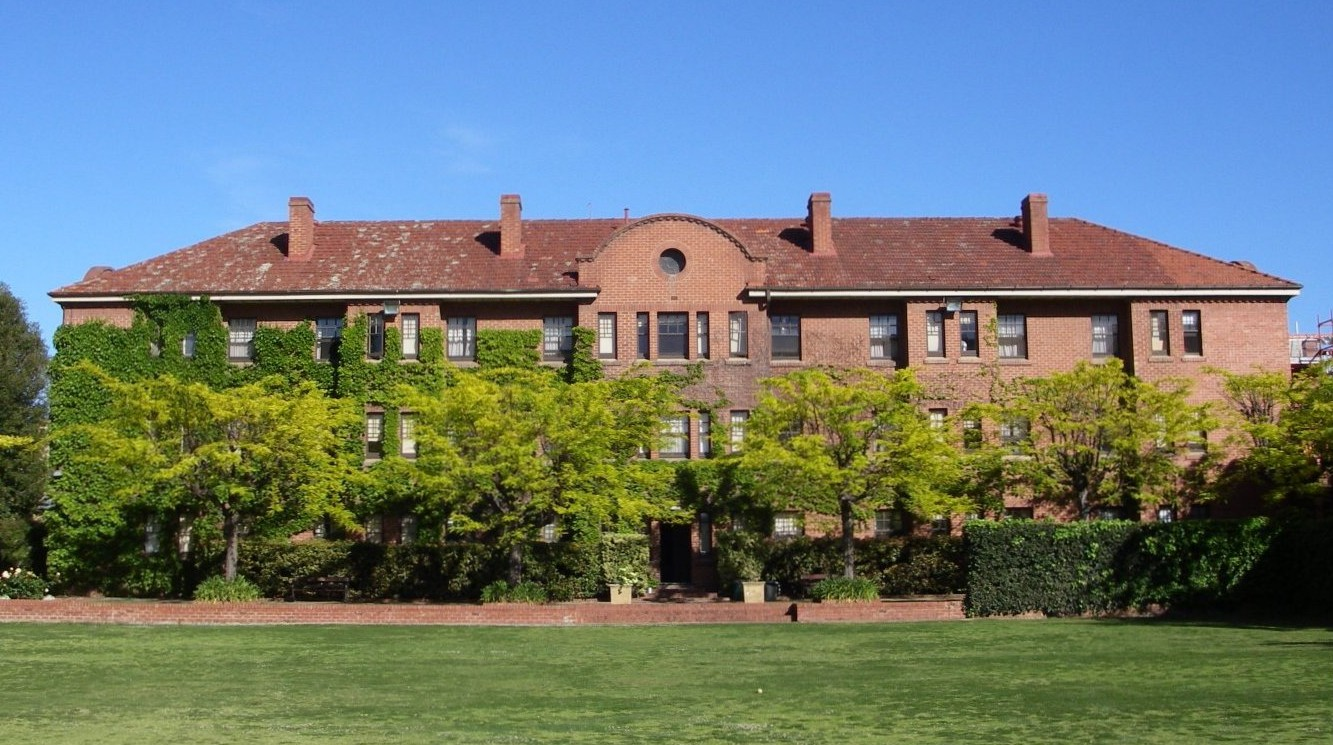
Newland Building is typical of the architecture at St. Mark's.

First year students are allocated single rooms in one of the three co-residential dormitory buildings on campus: Newland (3 floors), Downer House (3 floors) and East Wing (top 2 floors). Individual rooms are provided with Internet and phone connections, and there are shared laundry and bathroom facilities on each floor. All rooms and external doors are accessed by individual smart card locks. More senior students may apply for specific rooms within the dormitory buildings, the much sought-after Hawker House mansion, or one of the many apartments with self-contained kitchen, lounge and bathroom facilities. Each floor (or building in the case of Hawker House and the flats) has a designated Residential Advisor who provides wellbeing support to students living on the floor.

Downer House
This residence (designed by Rowland Rees for Sir John Downer in 1877) was the first building to be acquired by the college. It now houses college administration, the Junior and Senior Common Rooms, an academic tutor's apartment and computing and printing facilities. A draft of Australia's Constitution was prepared in the building's ballroom in 1897.

Newland Building
This was the first of the college's dedicated dormitory accommodation, completed in six stages from 1926 to 1964. The architect Walter Bagot drew inspiration from precedents in Oxford and Cambridge, as was the norm for Australian colleges at this time.

Memorial Building
Also completed in stages, "Memorial" (named for the students who fell in World War II) was intended to include a dining hall and eventually enclose the tennis courts completely, forming an Oxford-style quadrangle. However, the "quadrangle" plan was partially abandoned with the construction of the new dining hall on the southern edge of the tennis courts.

Grenfell Price Dining Hall
The centrally located dining hall was built in 1961 to accommodate growing numbers of students. It has seating for up to 250 people.

East Wing
This new building complex was opened on 1 March 2015 and comprises two floors of student accommodation, as well as an academic centre and basement gymnasium, alongside a multi-story carpark. The construction of East Wing helped complete the vision of an Oxford-style quadrangle.

The Ian and Pamela Wall Academic Centre
The Academic Centre on the ground floor of the East Wing houses some of the college's vast book collection, including the rare book collection. Three Simpson Tutorial Rooms are also available for students and are the location for the college's extensive academic tutorial program.

The Learning Commons
The Learning Commons, which opened in 2019, is a modern, open space located above the Grenfell Price Dining Hall comprising four tutorial rooms, a balcony overlooking the tennis courts, an open space for training activities, functions and events, and a kitchenette.

Allister McLeod Sports Pavilion
This modern gym, completed in 2015, is open to all students and access is inclusive within the residency fees. In addition to weight machines and free weights, there are a number of exercise machines, including treadmills, a rowing machine and a stairmaster.

Tennis Courts
Bounded by the above four buildings are four grass tennis courts that provide a versatile recreation space in the centre of the college.

Hawker House
A Victorian mansion was acquired by the college in 1970 through an anonymous donation, and named for South Australian politician Charles Hawker. It is also available for student accommodation, and is usually populated by senior students. A bungalow-style extension was later added for fresher accommodation, known as Hawker Annexe.

New Cain / New Abel / Matheson / Lewis / Wall
Awkwardly named for the buildings that were incrementally demolished or enveloped as the new structure grew, these three-bedroom apartments are each equipped with laundry, kitchen and lounge facilities. The newest extension, opened in 2007 and incorporating the Matheson, Lewis and Wall buildings, mirrors Memorial Building to the east. The newest apartments vary in floor plan and are occupied mostly by senior students.

"The Pond"
This small quadrangle is the central meeting place of the college. The cruciform pond features a sculpture of St Mark.

Chapel
The old Downer property stables were converted to a small chapel in the 1970s by a student at the college.

Walkley Cottage
Built in 1839, Walkley cottage is the oldest brick building still standing in the state of South Australia. It now houses the Dean of the college.

== Sport ==
St Mark's College competes in an inter-college sporting competition against Aquinas College, Flinders University Hall, Lincoln College and St Ann's College for the Douglas Irving Cup (formerly, and still usually referred to as, the High Table Cup). Competition takes place throughout the academic year in the following sports: tennis, swimming, cricket, debating, basketball, Australian rules football, soccer, netball, hockey, table tennis, volleyball, and athletics.

== Notable alumni ==
With an Old Collegian's network of over 3500, St. Mark's College has been the home of many notable members of the community. These include:

- Robin Ashwin, Rhodes Scholar, former Australian ambassador to the USSR and former Master of the college.
- John Bannon, Premier of South Australia 1982–1992 and former Master of the College
- Richard Blackburn, Rhodes Scholar, former Chief Justice of the ACT
- BM Debelle QC, Justice of the Supreme Court of South Australia.
- Julian Disney, Rhodes Scholar and founder of the Global Governance Group.
- Don Dunston AC QC, Social reformer and Premier of South Australia between June 1967 and April 1968, and again between June 1970 and February 1979.
- John Finnis, Rhodes Scholar, one of the world's leading authorities on legal philosophy and jurisprudence.
- Robert Hill, Chancellor of the University of Adelaide, former Australian Minister for Defence and Ambassador to the United Nations.
- Gillon McLachlan. Chief Executive Officer of the Australian Football League (AFL).
- Trevor McDougall AC FRS FAA FAGU FInstP FRSN, – physical oceanographer and climate researcher
- Tony McMichael, member of the Intergovernmental Panel on Climate Change, director of the Australian Centre for Epidemiology and Population Health.
- Justice RG Matheson QC, former judge of the Supreme Court of South Australia.
- Chief Justice Robin Rhodes Millhouse QC, Chief Justice of Kiribati, former judge of the Supreme Court of South Australia, former Attorney General for South Australia and first Australian Democrats parliamentarian.
- Dr James Muecke AM, ophthalmologist and Australian of the Year for 2020.
- Sally Sara, TV and radio journalist with the Australian Broadcasting Corporation.
- Ivan Shearer, member of the United Nations Human Rights Committee, former Dean of Adelaide and Sydney University Law Schools.
- Mike Smith, former Australian Ambassador for Counter-Terrorism to the United Nations

== Notes ==
=== Sources ===
- Jensen E & R (1980), Colonial Architecture in South Australia, Adelaide: Rigby, ISBN 0-7270-1404-8
- Kerr C (1983). Archie, the Biography of Sir Archibald Grenfell Price, Melbourne: Macmillan, ISBN 0-333-35624-1
- La Nauze J A (1972), The making of the Australian constitution, Melbourne: Melbourne University Press, ISBN 0-522-84016-7
- Price, A G (1968). A History of St. Mark's College, University of Adelaide, and the Foundation of the Residential College Movement, Netley: The Council of St. Mark's College
- Walkley, G (1985). St. Mark's College: The Buildings and Grounds, Adelaide: Lutheran Publishing House, ISBN 0-9588813-0-8
