= Brougham Place, North Adelaide =

Street in Adelaide, South Australia

Coordinates: 34.90986°S 138.59910°E

Brougham Place South Australia
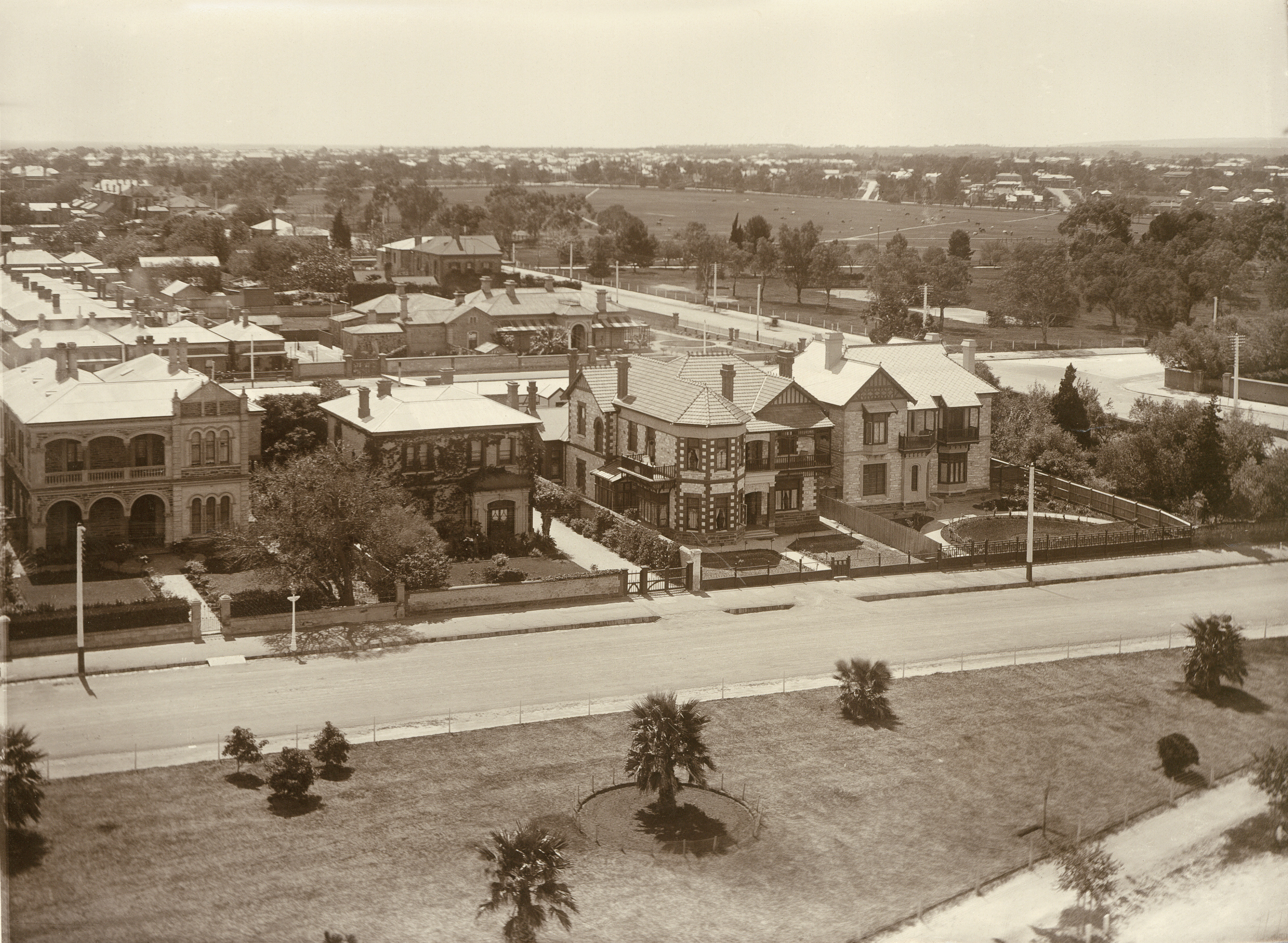
- Eastern end in 1910

General information
- Type: Street
- Location: North Adelaide
- Length: 1.7 km (1.1 mi)
- Maintained by: City of Adelaide
- Ring road around: Brougham Gardens

Location(s)
- LGA(s): City of Adelaide

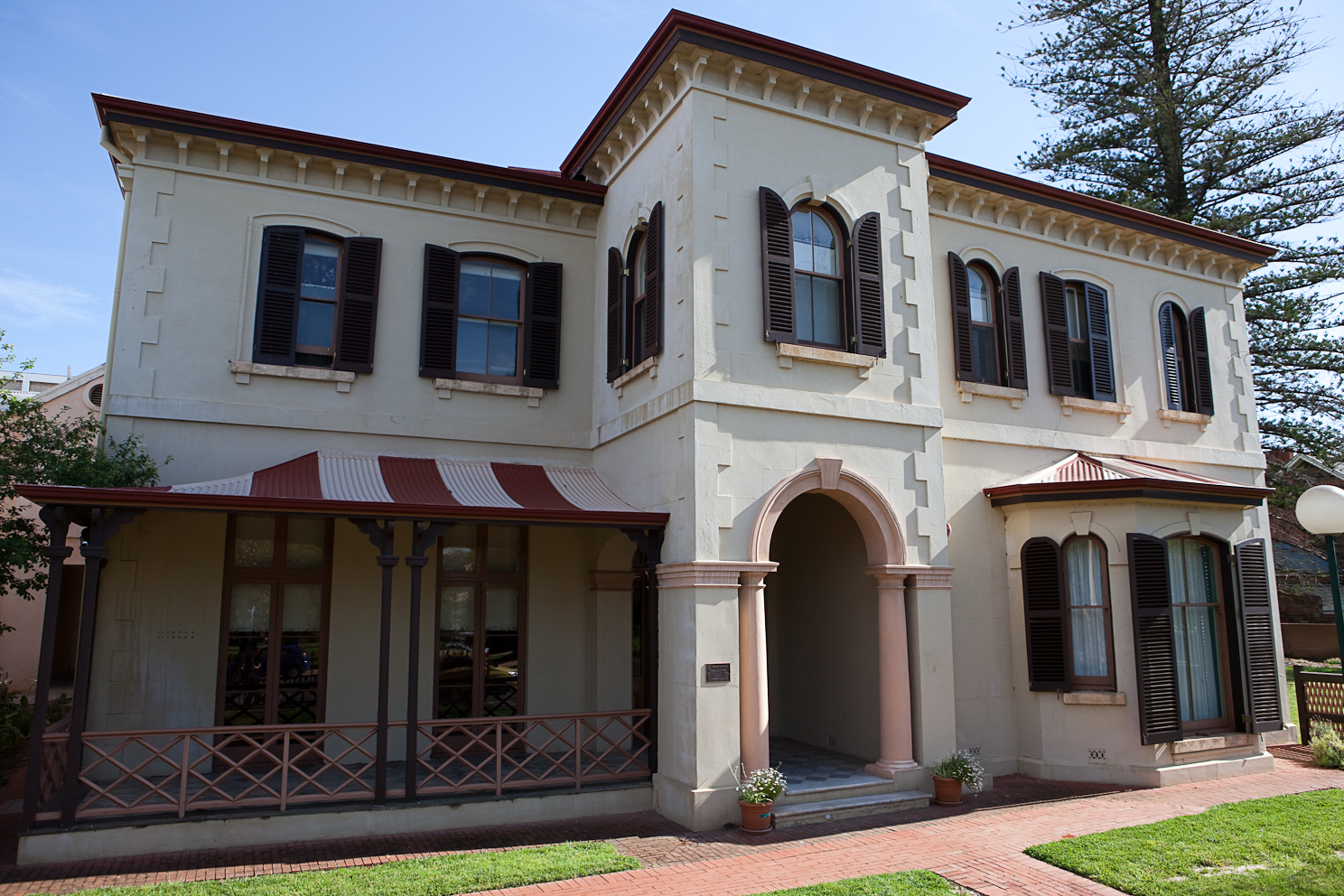
32 Brougham Place

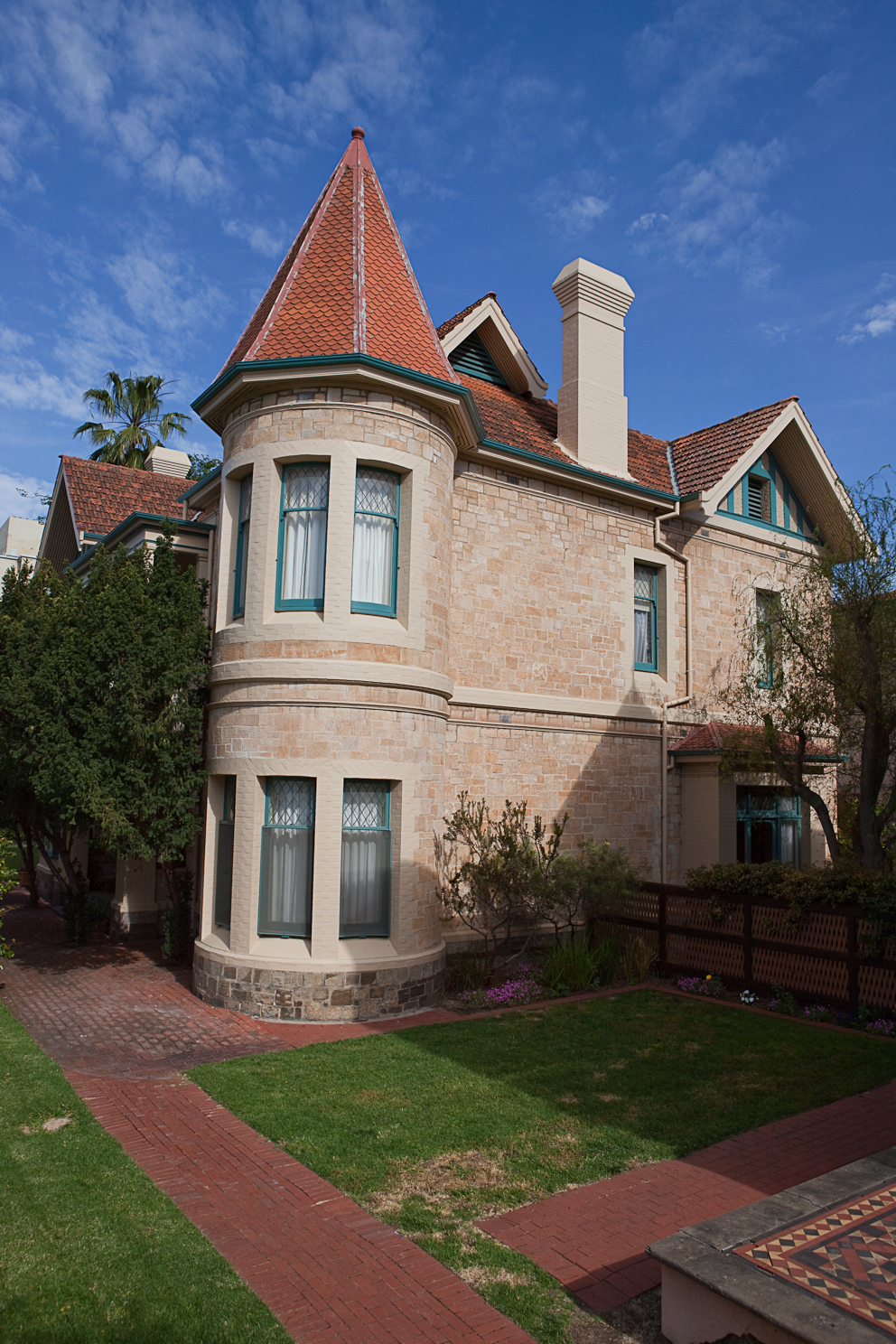
39 Brougham Place

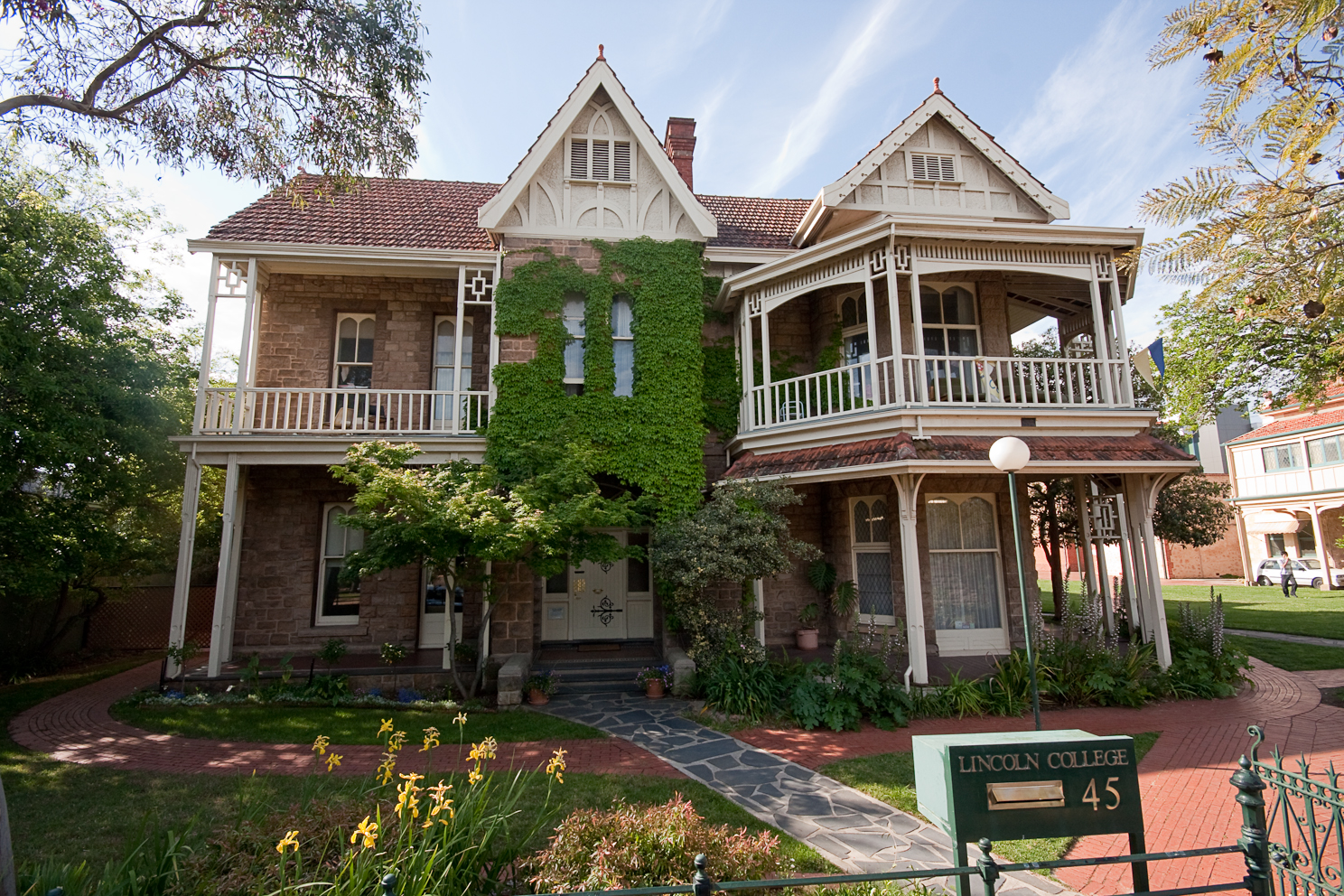
45 Brougham Place

Brougham Place is a street lined with large mansions set in landscaped grounds in the Adelaide suburb of North Adelaide, South Australia. It surrounds Brougham Gardens, (Park 29 of the Adelaide Park Lands), that joins the three grids that comprise North Adelaide. On 23 May 1837 it was named as Brougham Place along with other Adelaide and North Adelaide streets at a meeting at the Colonial Secretary. The street is named after Henry Brougham, 1st Baron Brougham and Vaux. He was a staunch supporter of the Reform Act 1832 (2 & 3 Will. 4. c. 45) and the passing of this act led to the third and successful attempt to found a colony in SA in 1834.

Brougham Place starts and finishes at its intersection with LeFevre Terrace and Stanley Street and runs anti-clockwise around Brougham Gardens. Like other streets in the City of Adelaide with properties only along one side, numbering is sequential from 1 to 228.

Institutions and heritage listed buildings along Brougham Place include

| Number | Name | Heritage listing | Notes |
|---|---|---|---|
LeFevre Terrace
| 1 | | | |
| 5-7 | Private dwelling. Built in 1907 for Sir Charles Henry Goode | State - File No. 13537 | |
| 9 | Taylor House (private dwelling) | State - File No.15536 | |
| 24 | St. Margarets | National | |
| 32 | Former Baker family dwelling, now the Federation House of Lincoln College | State | |
| 35-37 | Former dwelling now part of Lincoln College | State | |
| 39 | Former Rymill family dwelling now the Whitehead Building of Lincoln College | State - File No.13611 | |
| 45 | Former Milne family dwelling now the Administration Building of Lincoln College | State - File No.13610 | |
| 49 | Brougham House (private dwelling) | State | |
| 58 | | | |
King William Road / O'Connell Street
| 62 | Site of the former Hotel Australia | | |
| 71-74 | Belmont, former Masonic Hall | National | |
| 75-78 | Kingsmead House (private dwelling) | National | |
| 80 | South Australian office of the Australian Medical Association | | |
Palmer Place
| 82 | | | |
| 126 | | | |
King William Road
| 137-160 | Women's and Children's Hospital | | |
Sir Edwin Smith Avenue / Melbourne Street
| 187-191 | Lordello, then Moulden Court till 1947, then St. Ann's College | Local | |
| 196-208 | Brougham Place Uniting Church, formerly North Adelaide Congregational Church | National | |
| 210 | Former hall of North Adelaide Congregational Church (private dwelling) | State | |
| 222 | Private dwelling | National | |
| 225 | Private dwelling | State | |

== Brougham Court ==
Brougham Court (formerly Bower Street) is located off Brougham Place between 95 and 96. It contains the national heritage Ebenezer Baptist Chapel, built in 1843 at 21-29, now a private dwelling
