= North Adelaide =

- Suburb
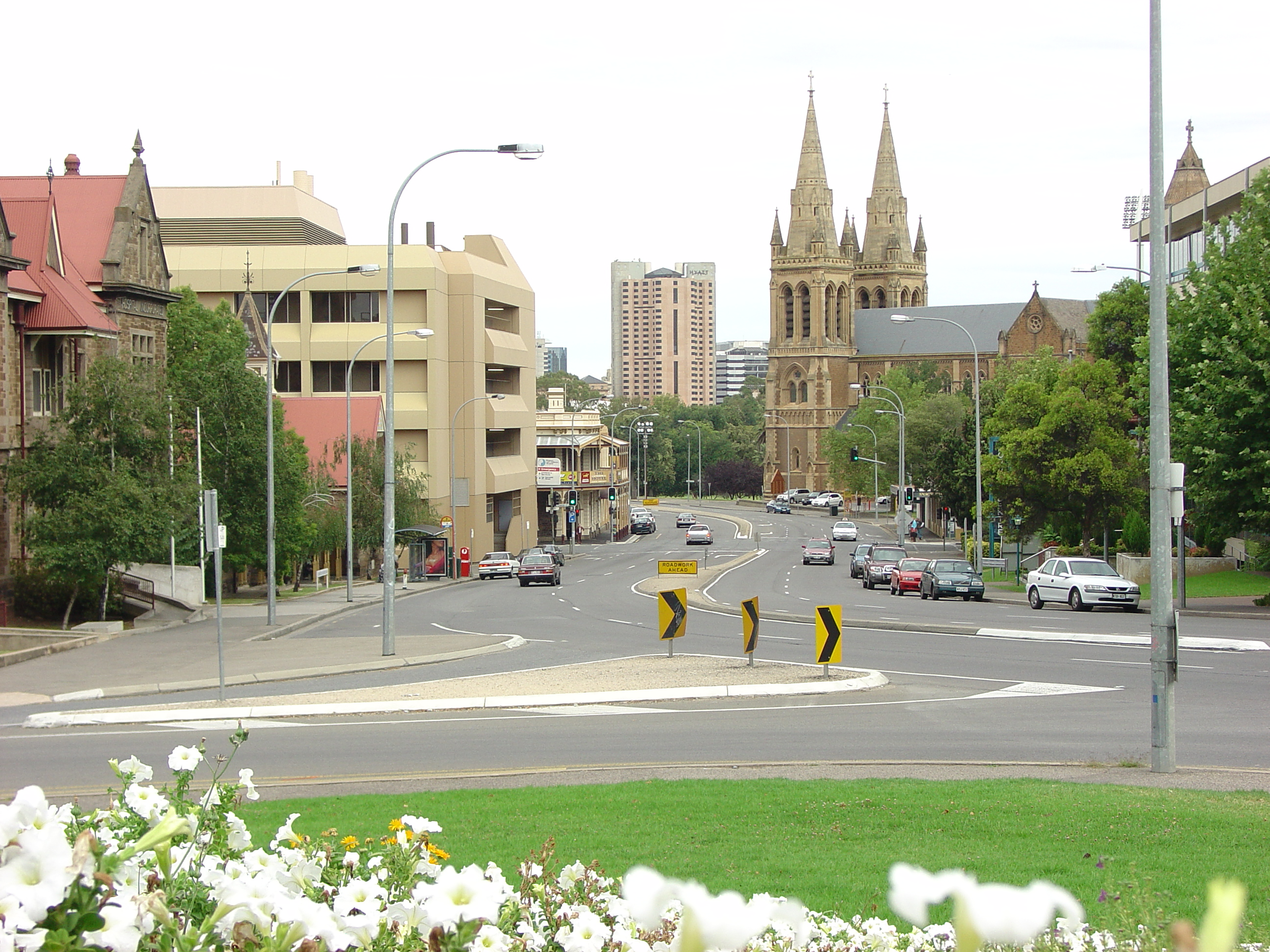
- North Adelaide looking south down King William Road to St Peter's Cathedral and the City

- Interactive map of North Adelaide
- Coordinates: 34°54′22″S 138°35′38″E
- Country: Australia
- State: South Australia
- City: Adelaide
- LGA: City of Adelaide
- Established: 1837

Government
  - State electorate: Adelaide
  - Federal division: Adelaide

Population
  - Total: 6,823 (SAL 2021)
- Postcode: 5006
- Mean max temp: 22.1 °C (71.8 °F)
- Mean min temp: 12.1 °C (53.8 °F)
- Annual rainfall: 558.1 mm (21.97 in)
Suburbs around North Adelaide
Bowden	Prospect	Medindie
Southwark	North Adelaide	Gilberton
Southwark; Adelaide	Adelaide	Hackney

North Adelaide is a predominantly residential precinct and suburb of the City of Adelaide in South Australia, situated north of the River Torrens and within the Adelaide Park Lands. Laid out in a grid plan in three sections by Colonel William Light in 1837, the suburb contains many grand old mansions.

== History ==
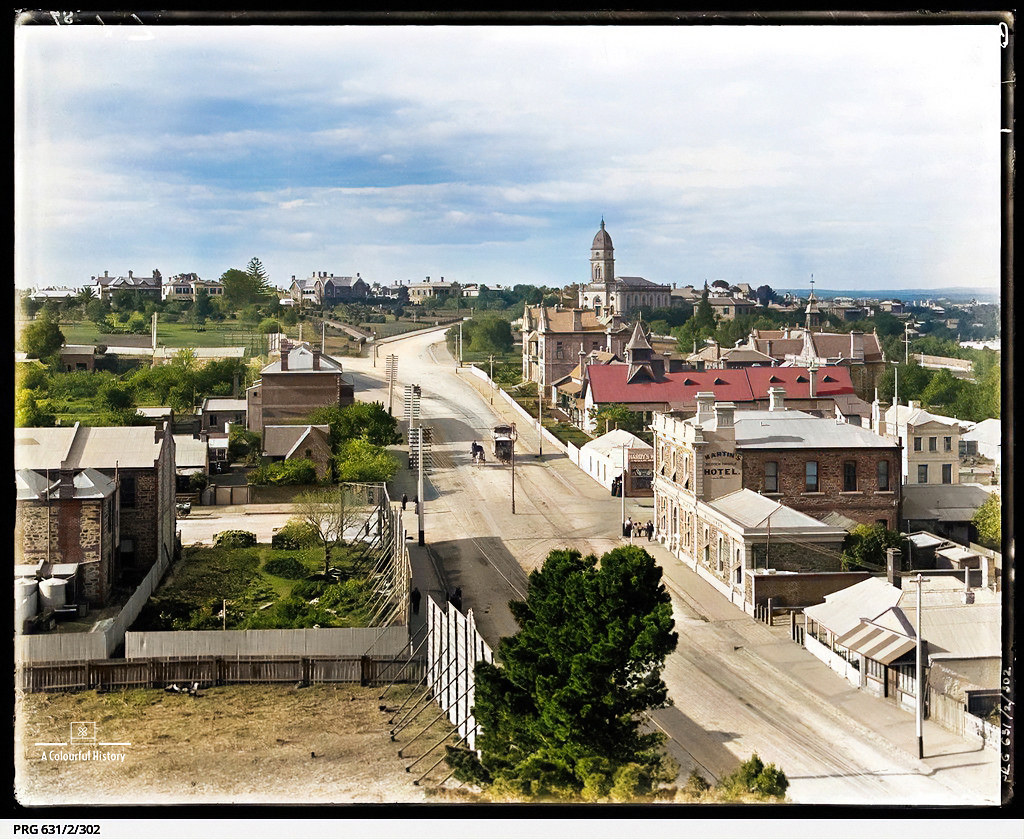
Looking northeast from St Peter's Cathedral, 1902

Surveyor-General Colonel William Light of the colony of South Australia completed the survey for the capital city of Adelaide by 10 March 1837. The survey included 1,042 acres (4.22 km^{2}), including 342 acres (1.38 km^{2}) north of the River Torrens. This surveyed land north of the river became North Adelaide.

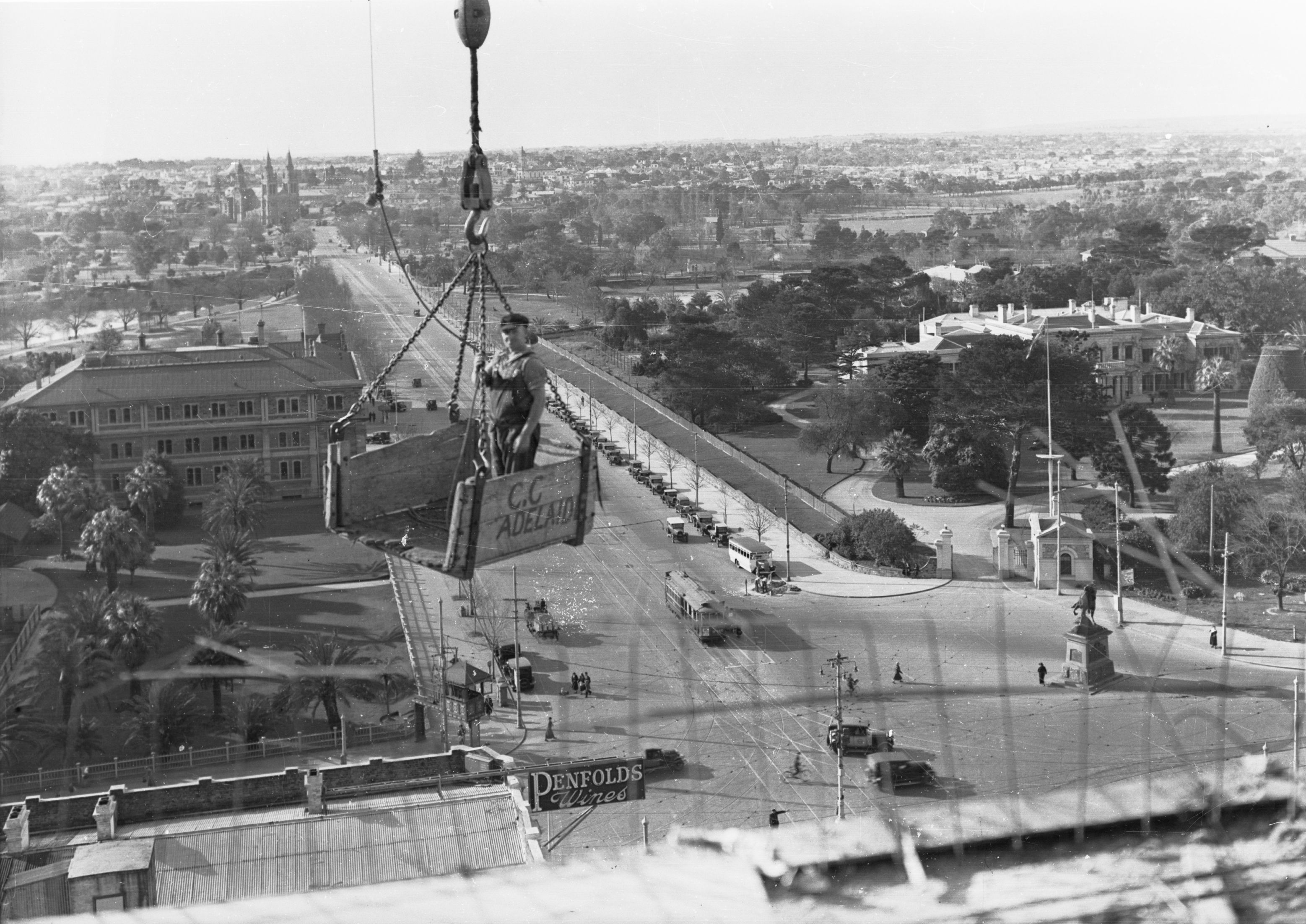
Looking northwards from North Terrace, Adelaide, c.1935

North Adelaide was the birthplace of William Lawrence Bragg (1890–1971), co-recipient of the Nobel Prize for Physics in 1915, and Emily Dorothea Pavy (1885–1967), a teacher, sociologist, researcher, and lawyer.

=== Kumanka ===
The Kumanka Boys' Hostel, located at 206 Childers Terrace, was operated by the South Australian Government between 1946 and 1980. In 1948, there were 23 boys aged between 13 and 18 years resident at the hostel. It was designed to accommodate state wards, as well as those for whom there was no other suitable accommodation after serving time at the government-run Magill Boys' Reformatory. H. A. Lyndon was appointed as superintendent, with his wife as matron. The aim of the hostel was to help the boys acquire skills for living in the wider community. They were free to come and go, subject to the superintendent's approval. They paid for their board, with the amount adjusted according to their wages, and were obliged to bank some of their income. They were expected to attend church, and encouraged to do other activities, take classes, and undertake voluntary work. There was a workshop, a piano, sporting equipment, and a library. Notable residents included Kaurna elder Uncle Lewis O'Brien, who had fond memories of his stay there, and wrote in his memoir that the Lyndons were "excellent people", who helped him attain his education.

By 1966 the average number of residents was 18. Kumanka was one of several institutions which had allegations of abuse aired during the Children in State Care Commission of Inquiry which was run by Ted Mullighan QC from 2004 to 2008, with most of the incidents reported to have occurred in the 1960s and 1970s.

The house, a double-storey bluestone residence built in 1870, still stands, and was registered on the South Australian Heritage Register in 2001.

=== Heritage listings ===
The suburb contains many other heritage-listed buildings, including:

- North Adelaide Post Office
- "Sunnyside", at 229 Stanley Street, designed by owner-architect F. Kenneth Milne in 1936; won the inaugural South Australian Institute of Architects Merit Award for Domestic Architecture in 1944

== Design ==
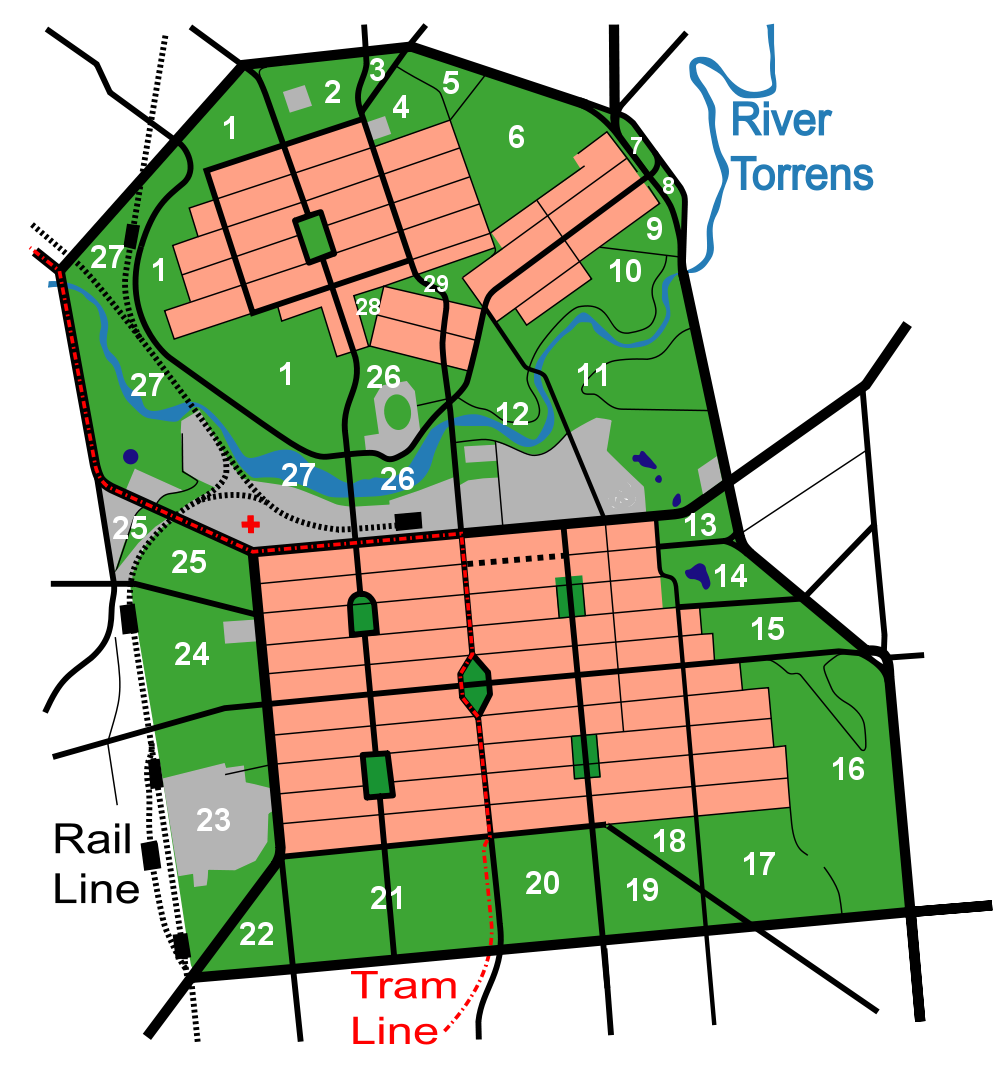
North Adelaide (north of the River Torrens), in relation to the Adelaide CBD (2010)

North Adelaide consists of three grids of varying dimension to suit the geography. North Adelaide is surrounded by parklands, with public gardens between the grids. The North Adelaide park lands (the Adelaide Park Lands north of the River Torrens) contain gardens, many sports fields (including the Adelaide Oval), a golf course, horse agistment paddocks and some areas sympathetic with the native environment.

The northernmost (and largest) grid has Wellington Square at its centre, and O'Connell Street (named after Daniel O'Connell) as its main commercial street. O'Connell Street is the continuation of King William Road, and links the main street of Adelaide City with Main North Road. A tram used to run up O'Connell Street and Melbourne street; the government is investigating extending the Glenelg tram along King William Road to terminate at Brougham Place. O'Connell Street has many cafes, restaurants, burger bars, shops and six pubs. Lincoln College (University of Adelaide) and Aquinas College (a residential college run by the Marists for the Archdiocese of Adelaide, for students at any Adelaide university), are also situated in this grid. Tynte Street is another commercial street in the largest grid running between Wellington Square and the east parklands. It contains the North Adelaide Primary School, a public library, a civic hall, a post office and a pub. Also on Tynte Street are the studios of radio stations Cruise 1323 and KIIS 102.3.

The southernmost (and smallest) grid is bordered by Brougham Place to the north, Pennington Road to the south, Sir Edwin Smith Avenue to the east and Palmer Place with adjoining Palmer Gardens/Pangki Pangki to the west (these two named after Lt Col George Palmer (1799-1883), a South Australian Colonisation Commissioner). This area contains the Women's and Children's Hospital, the Memorial Hospital, St Peter's Cathedral, St. Mark's College, the Cathedral Hotel (popular with cricket fans due its proximity to the Adelaide Oval), and the Queen's Head hotel (the oldest Adelaide pub, renovated in 2003).

The remaining (western) grid is termed Lower North Adelaide. It is nearest the Torrens floodplain. It contains Brougham Place Uniting Church, St. Ann's College, and four pubs. Melbourne Street, with cafes, restaurants, galleries, shops and two pubs, is its commercial street.

== Places of interest ==
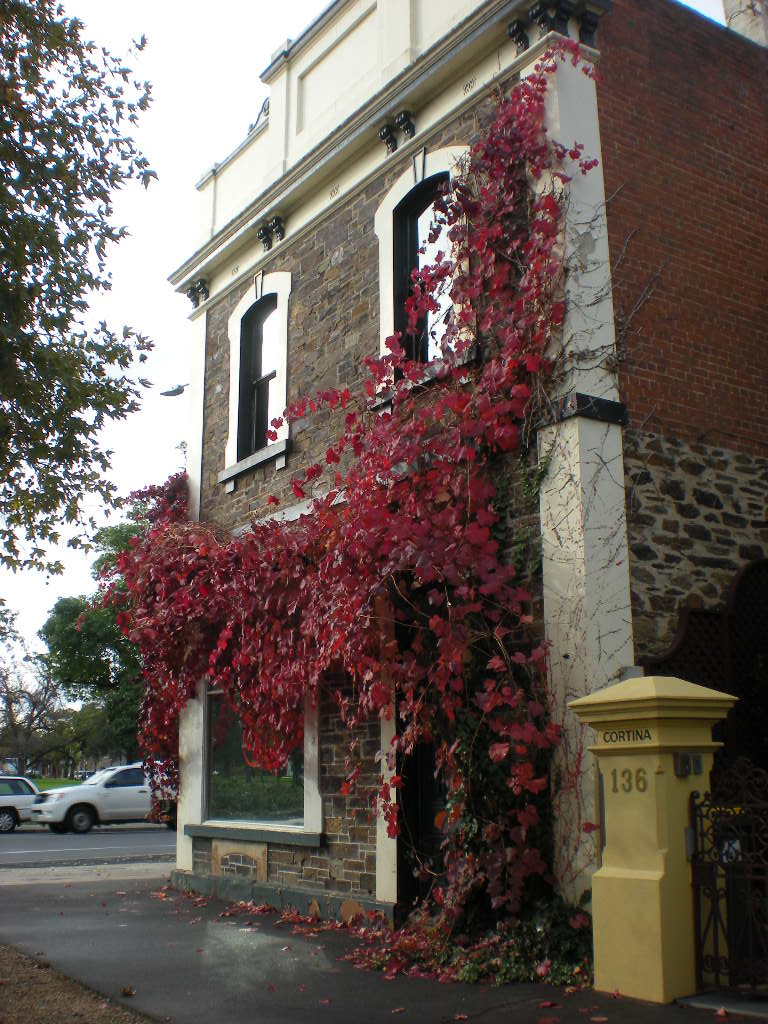
A former wine shop on Wellington Square

=== Dining and pubs ===
O'Connell Street and Melbourne Street are known for their many restaurants.

Many of the North Adelaide pubs and hotels are heritage-listed. As of 2021 there are 11 pubs operational in the suburb: five in (most on O'Connell Street):

=== Piccadilly Cinema ===
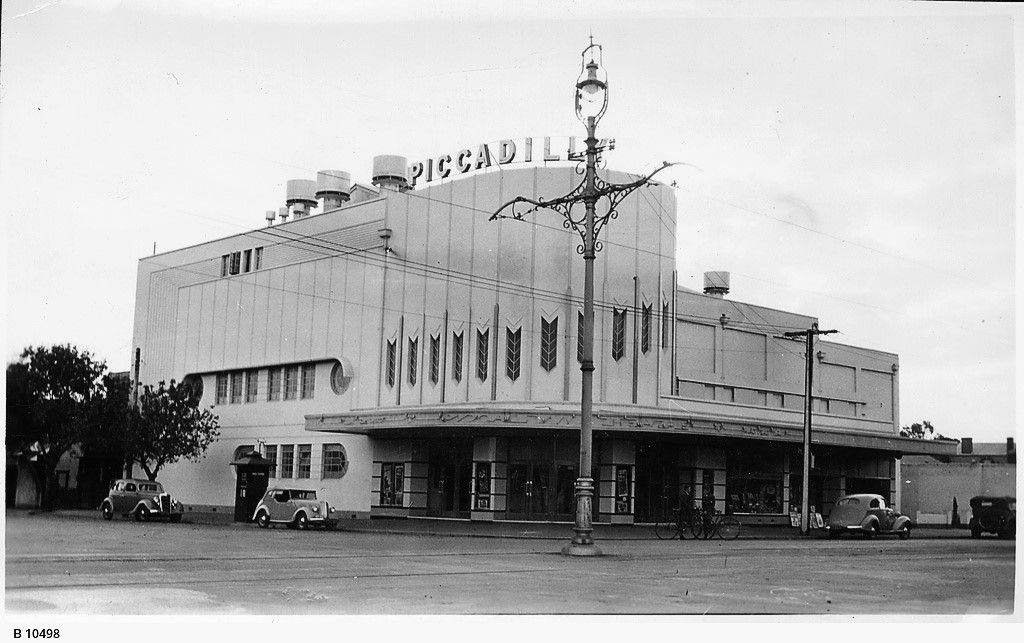
Piccadilly Theatre, North Adelaide, 1941

The Piccadilly, also known as Piccadilly Cinema(s), and formerly Piccadilly Theatre and The Forum, is a cinema located on the corner of O'Connell Street and Childers Street.

It was built for D. Clifford Theatres Ltd. as the Piccadilly Theatre in 1940, in art deco / moderne style. It is heritage-listed on both the South Australian Heritage Register and the Register of the National Estate. Dan Clifford chose the name due to his association with the town of Piccadilly in the Adelaide Hills as well as the famous Piccadilly Circus in London.

After Clifford's death in 1942, his theatres were bought by Greater Union in 1947, who renamed the Piccadilly as The Forum. In 1983 Wallis Cinemas bought the building in order to save it from being demolished, and reverted to its former name. During the 1990s Wallis converted the old picture palace into a multiplex with three screens.

After an 18-month closure to allow for a major renovation costing A$2 million, the cinema is set to reopen on 15 December 2022. Apart from the interior refit of the theatres, installation of a lift and other features, a new licensed food and drinks lounge space have replaced the shopfronts O'Connell Street, where the original candy bar was situated.

=== Churches ===
The Catholic churches in the suburb is dedicated to Saint Laurence and to St Mary.

== Education ==
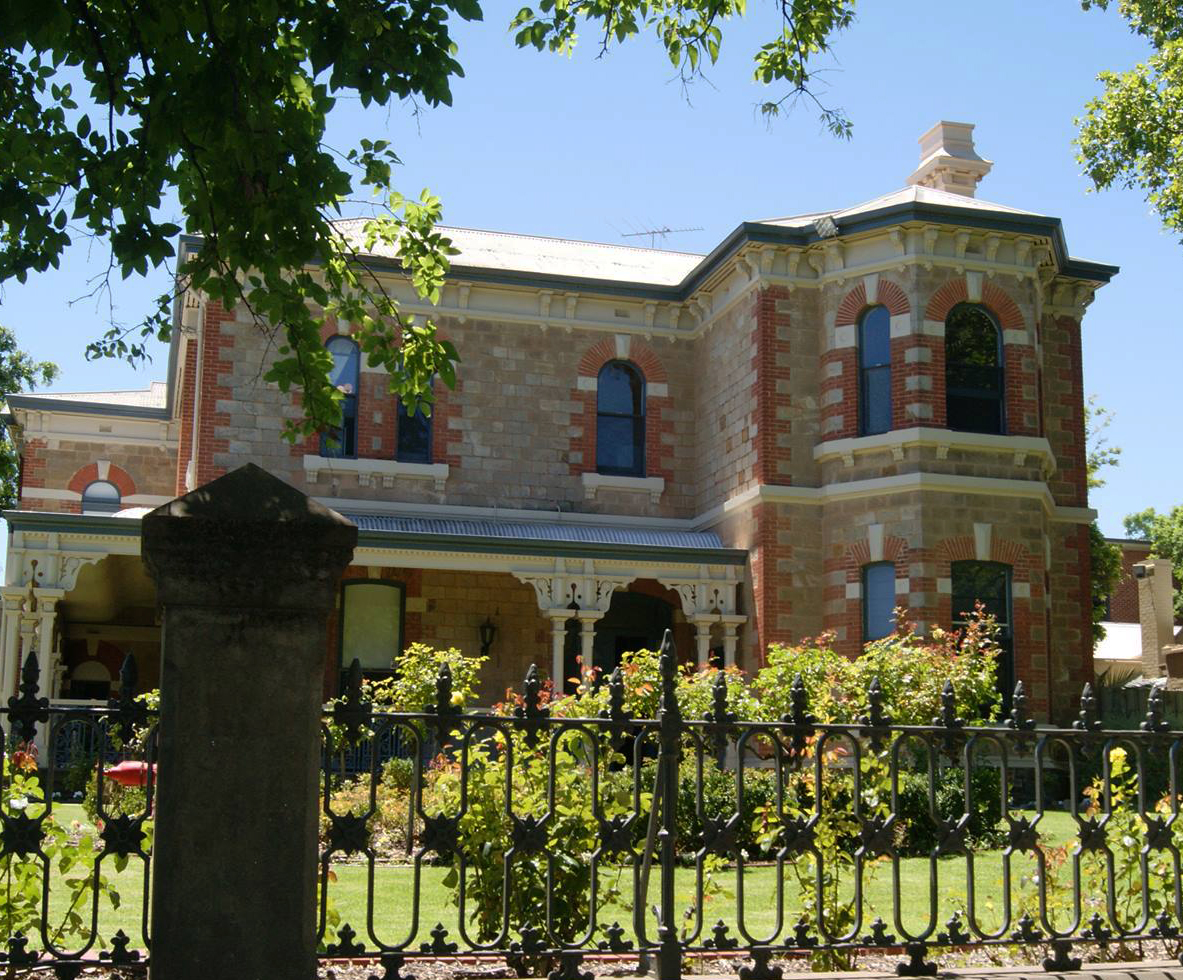
St Mark's College

The North Adelaide Primary School on Tynte Street was established in 1877 and is one of the oldest schools in South Australia. At 2007 its enrolment from reception to year seven was 250. The school's motto recorded on its World War One honour board is Esse quam videri, "To be, rather than to seem" and the school colours are red and blue.

Queen's College (1885–1949) on Barton Terrace was the longest lasting proprietary (i.e. privately owned and run) boys' college in Australia. Another private school of historical interest was North Adelaide Grammar School (aka. Whinham College).

Many residential colleges affiliated with the University of Adelaide are in North Adelaide, including Aquinas College, Lincoln College, St. Ann's College, St. Mark's College, Kathleen Lumley College (Postgraduate) and Australian Lutheran College, a Lutheran tertiary institution and seminary.

== Transport ==
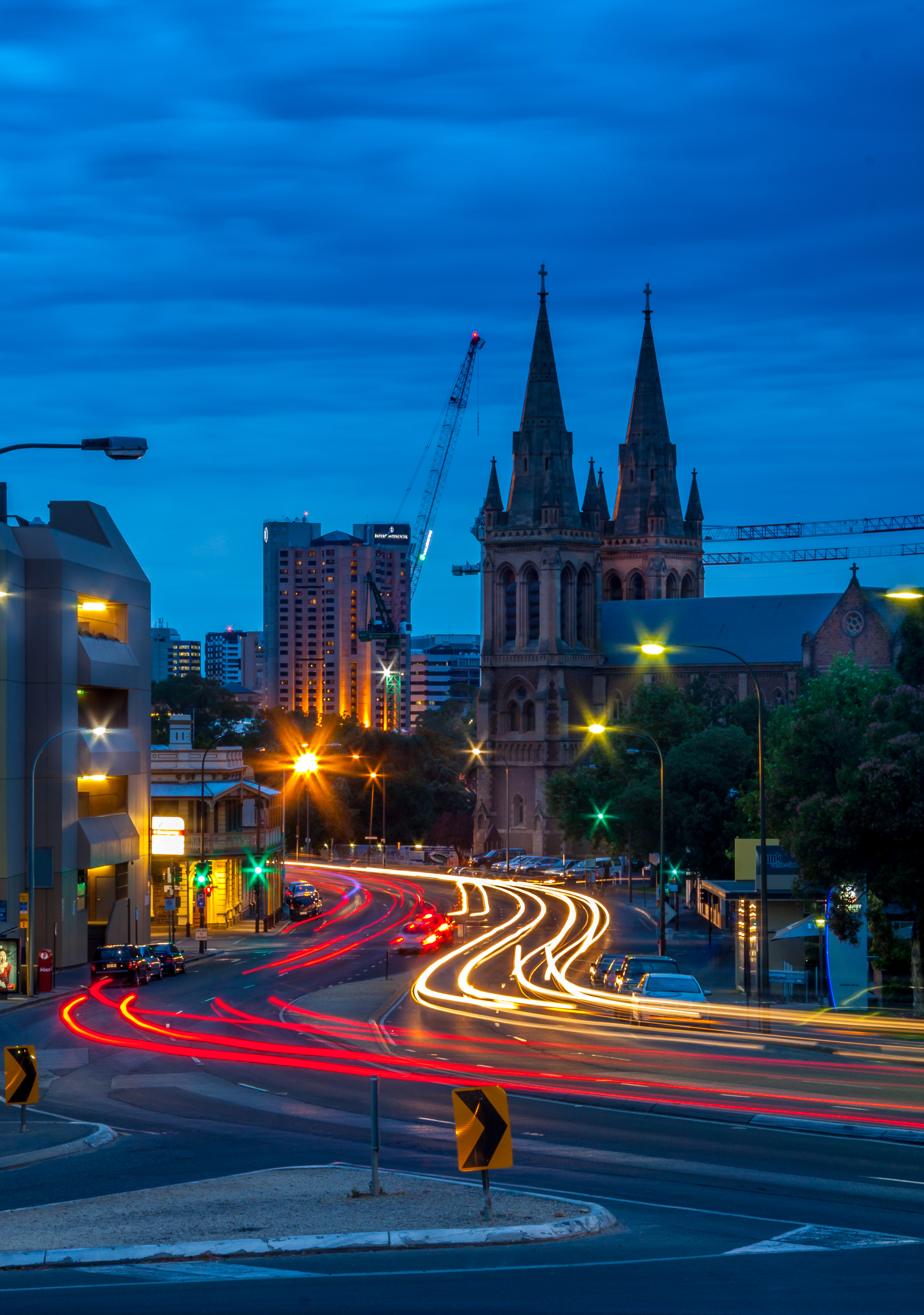
King William Road at night

North Adelaide is well served by road, although in peak hour some roads, particularly O'Connell Street and Melbourne Street, are quite congested.

North Adelaide railway station is located on the Gawler line of the Adelaide rail network. The railway station is however on the western edge of North Adelaide with infrequent services and is little used.

There are several Adelaide Metro bus routes that service the area on their way through to other suburbs. Buses run along several routes:

- King William Road, O'Connell Street, Ward Street, Hill Street, Mills Terrace then a bus only link to War Memorial Drive (since 1912, former electric tram route)
- King William Road, O'Connell Street, Ward Street, Jeffcott Street and Jeffcott Road
- King William Road, O'Connell Street and Prospect Road (since 1883, former horse tram route)
- King William Road, O'Connell Street and Main North Road (since 1883, former horse tram route)
- King William Road, Sir Edwin Smith Avenue and Melbourne Street (since at least 1912, former electric tram route)
- Frome Road and Melbourne Street
- Montefiore Road and Jeffcott Street (since October 2006)

Since 27 January 2014 a free loop bus operated jointly between the Adelaide City Council and the state government circulates through Adelaide and North Adelaide replacing a community bus operated by the Adelaide City Council.

There is provision for bicycles along LeFevre Terrace/Frome Road and Montefiore Road/Jeffcott Street/Wellington Square and many of the streets have little traffic and are bicycle friendly.

== Residents ==
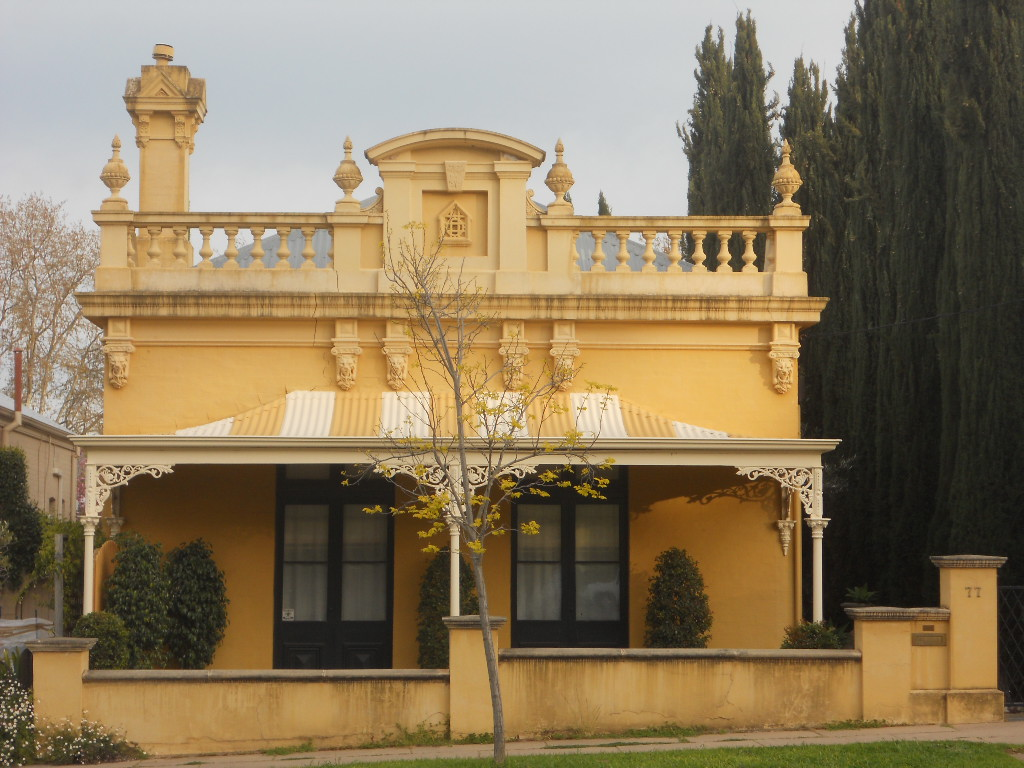
Many of the houses in North Adelaide are historic and therefore heritage-listed.

In the 2021 Australian census, the population of North Adelaide was 6,823, comprising 1,494 families. 58.9 per cent of the population had a tertiary education. The proportion of the population 20–29 years (12.1% 20–24 years, 8.7% 25–29 years) is greater than South Australia as a whole (6.1% 20–24 years, 6.6% 25–29 years)

In the 2016 Australian census, there were 6,950 people in North Adelaide.

=== Built form ===
There were 2,659 occupied private dwellings of which 43.6% were semi-detached, 28.7 were flats or apartments, and 26.4% were separate houses. The average household size in North Adelaide is 1.9, less than the South Australian average of 2.4. There are many significant heritage buildings in the area.

== Politics ==
2022 state election
Polling Booth	North Adelaide	2PP	North Adelaide East	2PP
Liberal	44%	47.6%	46.4%	49.9%
Labor	39%	52.4%	35.7%	50.1%
Greens	11.5%		12.4%	
Other Formal	5.5%		5.4%	
Formal Votes	2166		870	

2022 federal election
Polling Booth	North Adelaide	2PP	Lower North Adelaide	2PP
Liberal	40.1%	46.5%	47.3%	51.9%
Labor	29.6%	53.5%	28%	48.1%
Greens	23.7%		18.1%	
Other Formal	6.6%		6.6%	
Formal Votes	2029		797	

In state government, North Adelaide is part of the state electoral district of Adelaide, which has been held since 2022 by Labor MP Lucy Hood.

In federal politics, the suburb is part of the division of Adelaide, and has been represented since 2004 by a Labor MP, since 2019 being Steve Georganas. North Adelaide has one or two polling booths for federal and state elections, North Adelaide at the North Adelaide Primary School and for most elections, Lower/East North Adelaide at St Cyprian's Anglican Church. The first preference votes by booths for recent state and federal elections are shown in tables.

In local government, North Adelaide forms the North ward within the City of Adelaide. Since 2018 the North Ward Councillors are Mary Couros and Phillip Martin. Significant local issues since 2010 have included:

- Adelaide oval precinct
- Barton Road bus link
- LeCornu development site
- Height limits on developments
- Late night closing of hotels
- Redevelopment of the Adelaide Aquatic Centre by the Adelaide Crows
