= Geoffrey Harcourt =

Australian academic economist (1931–2021)

Geoff Harcourt AC
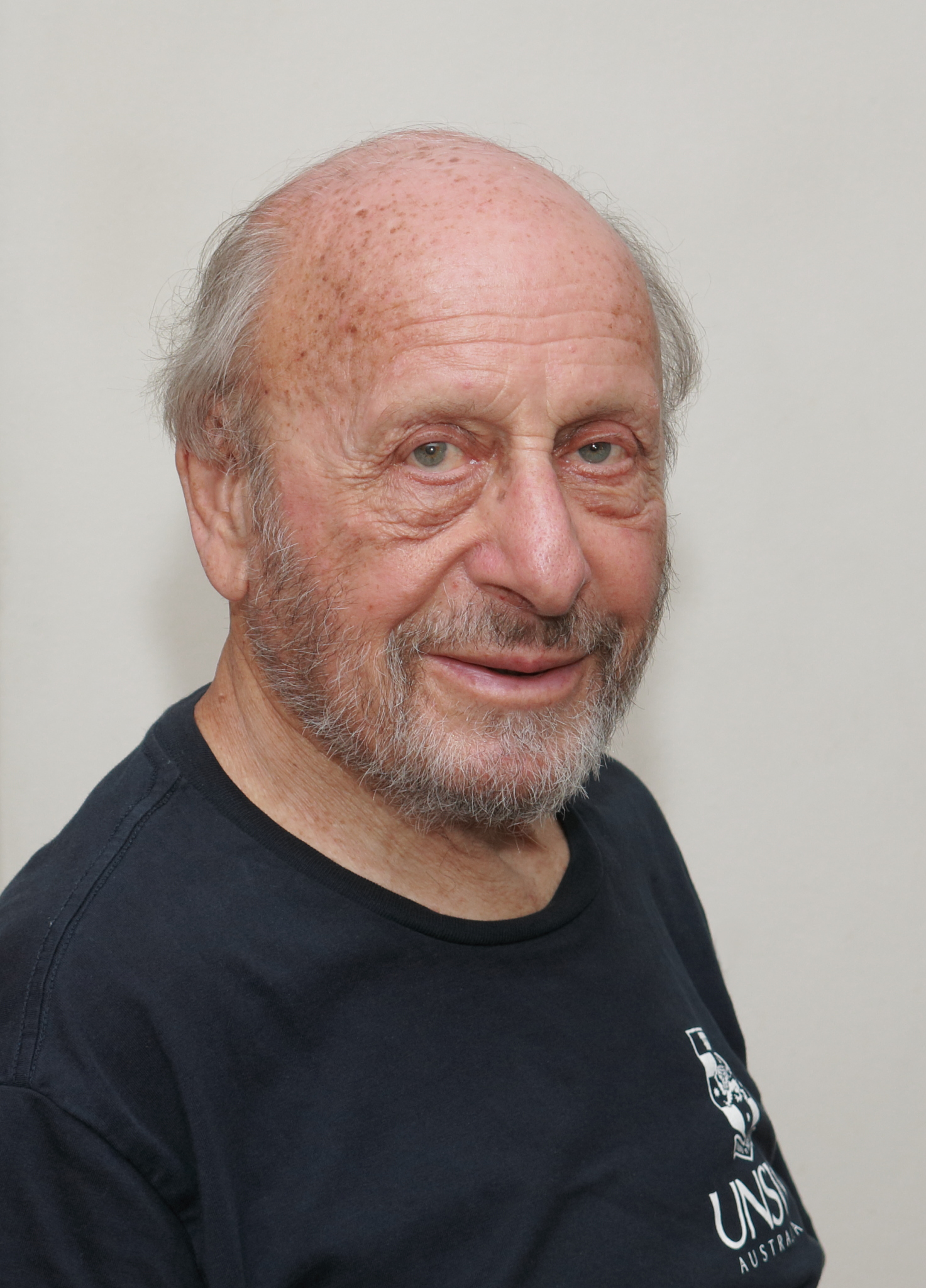
- Portrait of Geoff Harcourt (2016)
- Born: 27 June 1931; Melbourne
- Died: 7 December 2021 (aged 90); Sydney, New South Wales, Australia

Academic work
- School or tradition: Post-Keynesian economics
- Website: Information at IDEAS / RePEc

Geoffrey Colin Harcourt AC (27 June 1931 – 7 December 2021) was an Australian academic economist and leading member of the post-Keynesian school. He studied at the University of Melbourne and then at King's College, Cambridge.

== Biography ==
After studying economics at the University of Melbourne he moved to the University of Cambridge, where he received his doctorate. In 1958, he moved to the University of Adelaide as a lecturer and was appointed to a chair in Economics at Adelaide in 1967. (He was a University Lecturer at Cambridge and a Fellow of Trinity Hall 1964–66, on leave without pay from Adelaide). He was a University Lecturer (1982–90) and Reader (1990–98) in the Faculty of Economics at Cambridge and a Fellow and College Lecturer in Economics, Jesus College, Cambridge, 1982–98, and was President of Jesus College Cambridge, 1988–89 and 1990–92.

Harcourt made major contributions to the understanding of the ideas of Keynes, Joan Robinson and other Cambridge economists. He also made important contributions in his own right to post-Keynesian and post-Kaleckian theory. A review article of one of his volumes of 'Selected Essays' argues that (i) insofar as he has written on capital theory, it has been as an innovator and not as a mere raconteur, and (ii) that he has developed his own suite of post-Keynesian models – this is evident, for example, in his 1965 paper "A two-sector model of the distribution of income and the level of employment in the short-run" which is reprinted in The Social Science Imperialists: Selected Essays of G.C. Harcourt (edited by Prue Kerr).

He was married to Joan Harcourt and they had four children: Wendy Harcourt, a full professor at the International Institute of Social Studies of Erasmus University Rotterdam (married to Claudio Sardoni, honorary professor at La Sapienza University of Rome, with two children, Caterina Sardoni and Emma Claire Sardoni); Robert Harcourt, a marine ecology professor at Macquarie University; Tim Harcourt, also an economist (married to Jo Bosben); and Rebecca Harcourt, program manager for Indigenous business education at the University of New South Wales.

Harcourt died on 7 December 2021, at the age of 90.

=== Honours ===
Year	Achievement
1971	Elected a Fellow of the Academy of the Social Sciences in Australia
1994	Made an Officer in the General Division of the Order of Australia (AO) ‘for service to economic theory and to the history of economic thought’
1996	Made a Distinguished Fellow of the Economic Society of Australia
2003	Elected to an Academician (now Fellow) of the Academy of the Social Sciences in the UK
2004	Made a Distinguished Fellow of the History of Economics Society (USA)
2004	Made an Honorary Member of the European Society for the History of Economic Thought
2011	Received the Veblen-Commons Award from the Association for Evolutionary Economics
2012	Made a Distinguished Fellow of the History of Economics Society of Australia
2015	Received the Distinguished Alumni Award of the University of Adelaide 'in recognition of his outstanding leadership and contribution nationally and internationally in the field of economics'
2015	Made a Jubilee Fellow, Academy of the Social Sciences in Australia
2016	Elected a Fellow of the Royal Society of NSW (FRSN)
2018	Made a Companion in the General Division of the Order of Australia (AC) ‘for eminent service to higher education as an academic economist and author, particularly in the fields of Post-Keynesian economics, capital theory and economic thought’

== Selected publications ==
- Parker, Robert Henry, and Geoffrey Colin Harcourt, eds. Readings in the Concept and Measurement of Income. Cambridge: Cambridge University Press, 1969.
- Laing, N. F. Capital and Growth; Selected Readings; Edited by GC Harcourt and NF Laing. [Harmondsworth, Eng.]: Penguin Books, 1971.
- Harcourt, Geoffrey Colin. Some Cambridge controversies in the theory of capital. CUP Archive, 1972.
- The Social Science Imperialists. Selected Essays. Edited by Prue Kerr, (London: Routledge and Kegan Paul, 1982). Reprinted in the Routledge Library Editions Series in 2003.
- On Political Economists and Modern Political Economy. Selected Essays of G.C. Harcourt. Edited by Claudio Sardoni. (London: Routledge, 1992). Reprinted in the Routledge Library Editions Series in 2003.
- Post-Keynesian Essays in Biography: Portraits of Twentieth Century Political Economists. (Basingstoke, Hants: Macmillan, 1993).
- Capitalism, Socialism and Post-Keynesianism. Selected Essays of G.C. Harcourt. (Cheltenham, Glos., Edward Elgar, 1995).
- Selected Essays on Economic Policy. (London: Palgrave, 2001).
- 50 Years a Keynesian and Other Essays. (London: Palgrave, 2001).
- The Structure of Post-Keynesian Economics. The Core Contributions of the Pioneers. Cambridge: Cambridge University Press, 2006.
- (With Prue Kerr) Joan Robinson. Houndmills, Basingstoke, Hampshire: Palgrave Macmillan, 2009.
- (with Peter Kriesler, eds) The Oxford Handbook of Post-Keynesian Economics. Volume 1: Theory and Origins. New York, Oxford University Press, 2013. Volume 2: Critiques and Methodology.
- (with Joseph Halevi, Peter Kriesler and JW Nevile) Post-Keynesian Essays from Down Under: Theory and Policy from an Historical Perspective. Four Volumes. Palgrave Macmillan, 2015.

=== Book chapters ===
- Harcourt, G.C. (1982), "The Sraffian contribution: an evaluation", Classical and Marxian political economy: essays in honour of Ronald L. Meek, by Meek, Ronald, Bradley, Ian C.; Howard, Michael C. (eds.), London: Macmillan, pp. 225–275, ISBN 9780333321997.

=== Articles, a selection ===
- Harcourt, Geoffrey Colin. "Some Cambridge controversies in the theory of capital." Journal of Economic Literature 7.2 (1969): 369–405.
- Harcourt, Geoffrey C., and Peter Kenyon. "Pricing and the investment decision." Kyklos 29.3 (1976): 449–477.
- Hamouda, Omar F., and Geoffrey Colin Harcourt. "Post Keynesianism: From Criticism to Coherence?." Bulletin of Economic Research 40.1 (1988): 1-33.c
- Cohen, Avi J., and Geoffrey C. Harcourt. "Retrospectives: Whatever happened to the Cambridge capital theory controversies?." Journal of Economic Perspectives (2003): 199–214.
