= Tim Harcourt =

Australian economist

Tim Harcourt is an Australian economist who is the Industry Professor and Chief Economist at the Institute for Public Policy and Governance (IPPG) at the University of Technology Sydney (UTS). He is also Chief Economist for the Centre for Sport Business and Society at UTS.

He hosts The Airport Economist channel on Ticker News https://tickernews.co/airporteconomist/

He was previously Professor of Practice and JW Nevile Fellow in Economics at the UNSW Business School, and an advisor to the Government of South Australia on international engagement.

Harcourt was awarded a Bachelor of Economics (Honours) from the University of Adelaide, and a Master of Arts in economics from the University of Minnesota, and also completed the Trade Union Program at Harvard Law School. He was the Chief Economist of Austrade (the Australian Trade Commission) until 2011, and earlier worked for the Australian Council of Trade Unions, the Australian Industrial Relations Commission and the Reserve Bank of Australia.

Harcourt has taught International Business at UTS and in the AGSM MBA programme in Asia and Latin America with a focus on China, India, ASEAN, Brazil, Chile, Colombia and other emerging markets. Tim is a visiting professor at the Pontificia Universidad Catolica (PUC) in Chile. He also writes for a number of major publications including The Australian Financial Review, The Sydney Morning Herald, The Age, Business Review Weekly, The Australian, The Advertiser, The Herald Sun, The West Australian, The Courier Mail, The OECD Observer, The Globalist, The National Times, The Drum, The Conversation, The Economic Times and various websites and blogs.

Harcourt is the author of 8 books on the international economy including The Airport Economist , The Airport Economist Flies Again! and "Footynomics and the Business of Sport"

He is married and has a daughter adopted from the People's Republic of China and a son from Taiwan. He is the son of Geoff Harcourt, an academic economist, and Joan Harcourt.

== Books ==
- The Airport Economist (2008). Allen & Unwin, ISBN 978-1-74175-512-1
- Going the Distance: Essays on Australia and the Global Economy: 2004-2008 (2008). Australian Trade Commission
- Beyond Our Shores: Essays on Australia and the Global Economy (2005). Australian Trade Commission, ISBN 0-95807-413-5
- Trading Places – The Airport Economist's guide to International Business UNSW Press 2014
- The Airport Economist Flies Again! (2021) Cambridge Scholars Publishing IBSN (10) 1-5275-6776-1
- "Footynomics and the Business of Sport" (2024) Cambridge Scholars Publishing IBSN 978-1-0364-1158-9
