= Aquinas College, Adelaide =

Residential college

Coordinates: 34°54′44″S 138°35′38″E

Aquinas College
- Catholic residential college
- University of Adelaide; Flinders University; University of SA
- Location: North Adelaide
- Motto: Lucere et Ardere (Latin)
- Motto in English: To enlighten with knowledge and enliven with faith
- Established: 1950
- Named for: St Thomas Aquinas
- Gender: Non-Specific
- Website: www.aquinas.edu.au

Aquinas College on Montefiore Hill, at Palmer Place, North Adelaide, is a residential college providing accommodation and support for Roman Catholic students at one or other of Adelaide's universities: University of Adelaide, Flinders University and the University of South Australia. The centrepiece of the establishment is "Montefiore", once the residence of Sir Samuel Way and (later) his family.

== History ==
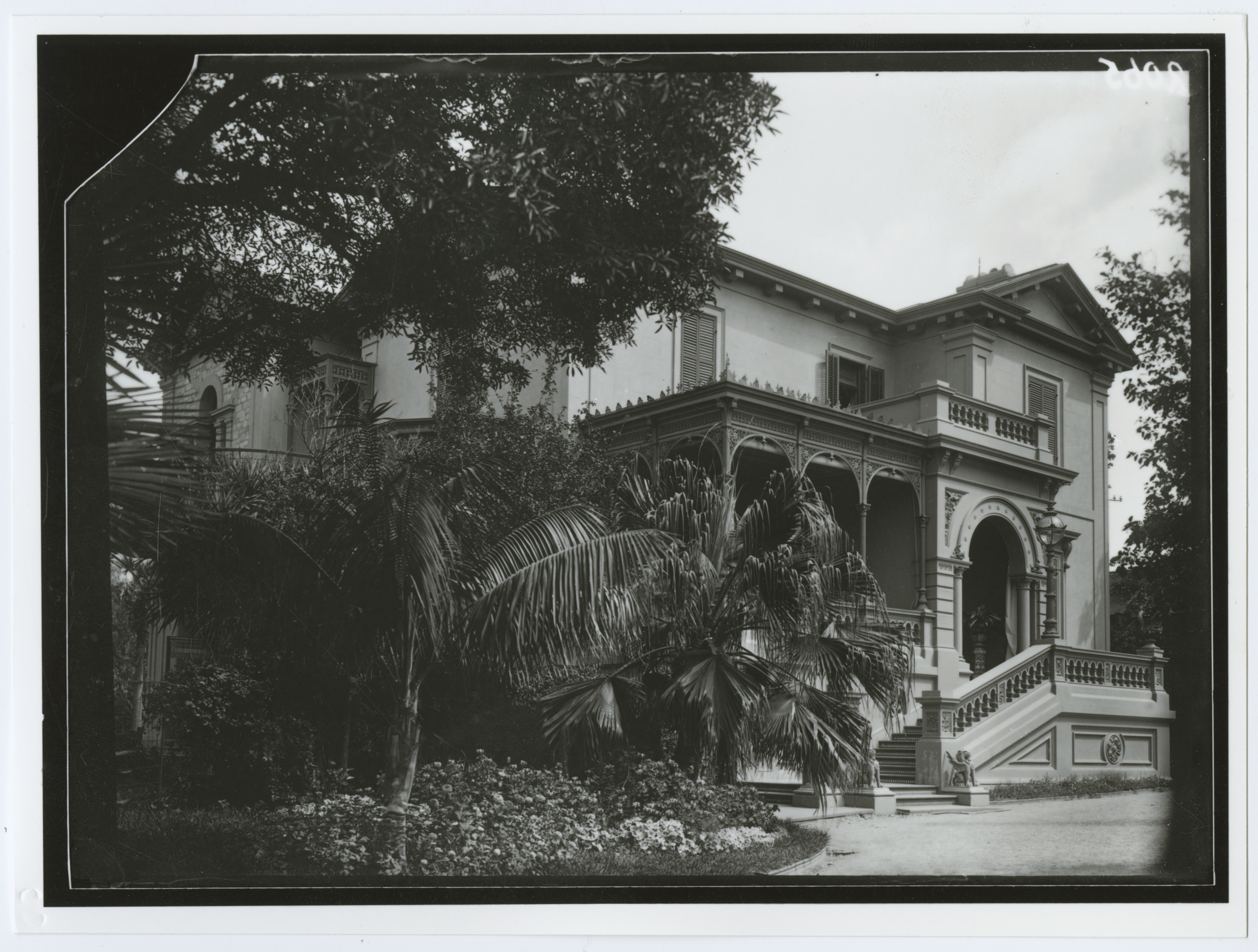
Eastern view c. 1890 of Montefiore, at the time Samuel Way's residence at North Adelaide. After his death the second storey was removed.

The building "Montefiore" was purchased by the Catholic Archdiocese of Adelaide in 1945 and in 1948 dedicated by the Bishop of Adelaide as a residential college for male Catholics studying at the University of Adelaide. The house was previously the residence of Sir Samuel Way, a previous legal and political identity in the early Twentieth Century. The College was intended to function in much the same way as the nearby St Mark's had served male Anglicans since 1925 and St Ann's had provided for females of any persuasion since 1947. In this respect Adelaide had fallen behind the other capital cities, according to the master of St Mark's, Dr A. Grenfell Price.

Father Cornelius P. Finn SJ, previously Dean of Newman College of the University of Melbourne, commenced his duties at the college on 17 January 1950. The College, which was expected to cater for 50 students, opened in March 1950 with 20 enrolments. Inter-college sporting contests began almost immediately, with the first cricket match being won by Aquinas. Its official opening took place on Sunday 30 September 1951, when Archbishop Beovich performed the blessing ceremony and Sir Mellis Napier, Chancellor of Adelaide University, declared the college officially open. By this time there were 40 students and a "considerable waiting list".

In 1975 the all-male college became co-residential. The College also catered for students attending other tertiary institutions, including the various Colleges of Advanced Education, and Flinders University. Other North Adelaide Buildings (Strangways, O'Connell Street in the 1960s & 101 Palmer Place in the 1990s) were rented out by the College for student accommodation, increasing the College's bottom line.

By 2020 there was accommodation at the college for 200 students.

=== House Names ===
Beovich - named after Archbishop Matthew Beovich, Archbishop of Adelaide in the early-mid 20th Century.

Finn - named after Cornelius Finn SJ, the College's first Rector.

Gleeson - named after Archbishop James Gleeson, Archbishop of Adelaide in the mid-20th Century.

Hannan - named after Albert James Hannan, a South Australian Crown solicitor, who worked in the South Australian judicial system in the first half of the 20th Century.

MacKillop - named after St Mary MacKillop, Australia's first beatified saint.

Marian - named after the devotion to Mary, Mother of Jesus

Marcellin - named after Marcellin Champagnat, founder and patron of the Marist Brothers.

Roche - named after John Roche, a benefactor who assisted in the purchase of the Cudmore House residence, now named Roche House

Roma Mitchell - named after the Catholic legal representative who was a South Australian judge in the 20th Century.

=== House History ===
The initial buildings for the College, were the brick buildings of Beovich and Hannan, built within the Montefiore grounds. A purchase of the Roche building allowed for the expansion of more rooms and the chapel, set up in the front of the building. The College expanded its footprint by purchasing the building between the two properties, then owned by the Darling sisters, to create the Gleeson building quarters. During the 1980s, construction of the Finn double storey extension in the rear of the Roche property brought more residences to the College portfolio. Four residences adjoining the two court squash courts at the rear of the property, called "The Stables", which have since been demolished.

During both the 1960s & 1970s (for the building on Jeffcott Street, called Strangways), and again in the 1990s (for the property on the eastern side of Palmer Place, 101 Palmer Place), the College rented multistorey buildings to cater for the increased demand for college places.

In the late 1990s, the tennis court on the Jeffcott Street side of the Gleeson section of the property was sacrificed for the multi-storey MacKillop building to be constructed, housing student residences, the new kitchen & dining room, allowing for the College Chapel to be relocated in the previous Hannan Diningroom extension.

== List of Rectors ==
Originally recruited from the Jesuits, from 2014 rectors of St Aquinas College were supplied by the Marist Brothers.

- 1950–1951: Rev. Cornelius Finn SJ (Note: i.e. Society of Jesus (the Jesuits), a Catholic religious order)
- 1952–1961: Rev. Michael Scott SJ
- 1962–1969: Rev. Bryan Buxton SJ
- 1970–1975: Rev. James McInerney SJ
- 1975–1982: Rev. Ian Howells SJ
- 1983–1986: Rev. Daven Day SJ
- 1986–1997: Rev. Theo Overberg SJ
- 1997–2000: Rev. Michael Head SJ
- 2001–2004: Rev. John Shanahan
- 2005–2006: Mr Sam Armstrong
- 2006–2011: Prof. Denis Ralph
- 2011–2013: Dr Colin MacMullin
- 2014: Brother John Furlong FMS (Note: i.e. Marist Brothers (Latin: Fratres Maristae a Scholis), a Catholic religious order) (acting)
- 2015–2017: Brother Paul Gilchrist FMS
- 2018–2022: Brother Michael Green FMS
- 2022-2024: Sean Brito-Babupulle
- 2025- : Dr Sarah Moller

== See also ==
- Catholic education in Australia
