= Lincoln College (University of Adelaide) =

Coordinates: 34°54′32″S 138°35′54″E

- Location: North Adelaide
- Motto: Per Litteras ad Fidem (Latin)
- Motto in English: Through Learning to Faith
- Established: 1952
- Named for: Lincoln College, Oxford
- Gender: co-residential (s. 1973), prior all-male
- Principal: Carolyn Mee
- President: Cleo Graske (2026)
- Website: www.lincoln.edu.au

Lincoln College is a Uniting Church in Australia residential college affiliated with the University of Adelaide. It was established by the Methodist Church of Australasia in 1952 and is named after Lincoln College, Oxford at which John Wesley was a fellow.

Lincoln College started as a men's college and admitted women in 1973. Currently, the college has 214 residents, with about 15% international students.

== History ==
=== Motto and crest ===
Lincoln College Motto and Crest

In 1953, a year after the opening of the college, the council adopted as the college motto one strongly recommended by the Master, the Rev. Frank Hambly. It was Per Litteras ad Fidem (through Learning to Faith).

The College Council invited college members to submit designs for a coat of arms. Several designs were submitted. The chosen design was devised by John Burchmore, later to become president of the College Club and drawn by Nicholas Feodoroff. With some modifications suggested by the College of Arms it was accepted and officially granted by the college.

The design of the coat-of-arms embodies, in heraldic terms, both the origins and the aims of the college. The shield is surmounted by a gold stag, taken from the Arms of Lincoln College, Oxford. Its quarters comprise:

- Left upper: The symbol of faith; a crimson cross on a silver background from the Arms of the Methodist Church in Australia.
- Right upper: Three argent scallops on crimson, representing the Trinity and baptism, taken from John Wesley’s crest.
- Left lower: Argent Southern Cross on azure as a symbol of Australia.
- Right lower: An open book on argent and gold, representing learning and taken from the arms of the University of Adelaide

== Buildings and grounds ==
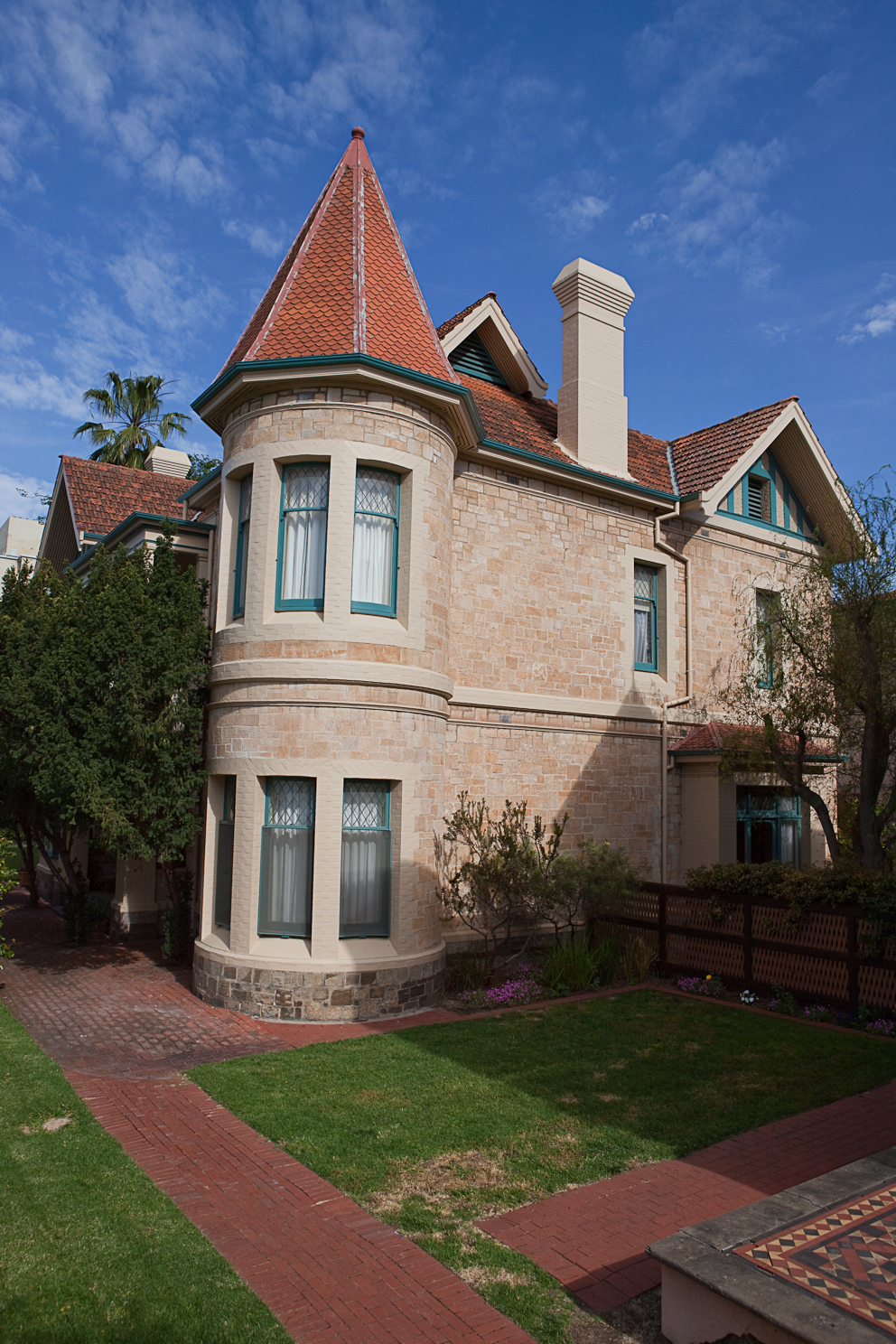
Whitehead Building, 39 Brougham Place

Located on Brougham Place in North Adelaide it comprises four state heritage-listed buildings, once the homes of prominent Australians. The campus also comprises three residential blocks; a chapel and music rooms.

=== Whitehead ===
Number 39 Brougham Place (also known as Whitehead) built in 1907 was the home of A. G. Rymill, and also subsequently his son, long serving Adelaide City Councillor, Sir Arthur Campbell Rymill who was Mayor (1950 – 1954). This grand villa of sandstone with a fish scale tiled tower is typical of the grand residence of the Edwardian period. It is representative of the grand residential style of Brougham Terrace. The Whitehead building has been the principal’s residence for the last 30 years.

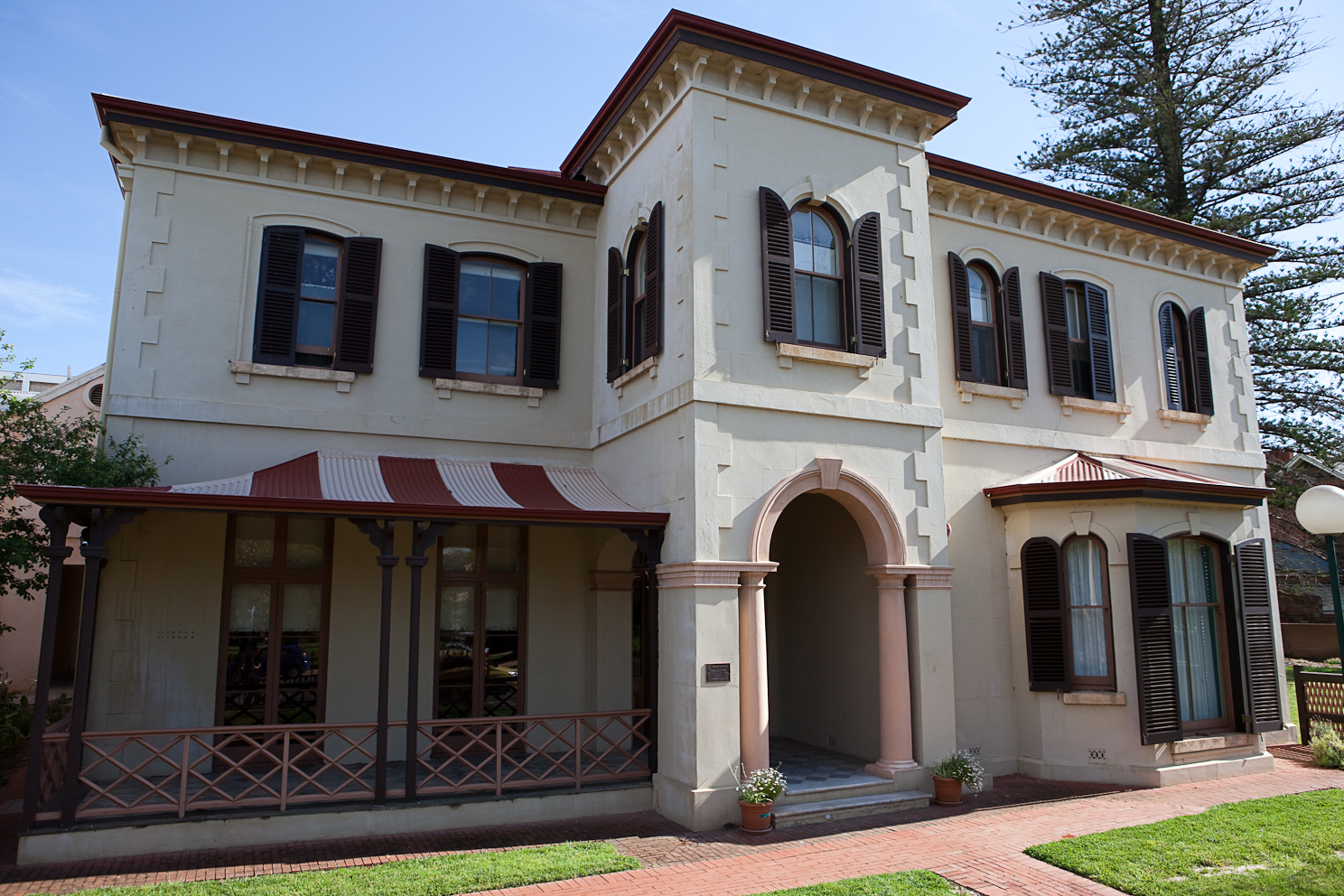
Federation House, 32 Brougham Place

=== Federation House ===
Number 32 Brougham Place is a mansion which is a former residence of Sir Richard Chaffey Baker who was a barrister, pastoralist and politician. Baker was the first South Australian born member of the colonial legislature, native-born member of the legislative council, senator and the first President of the Australian Senate. He was knighted in 1895 and appointed Queen's Counsel in 1900. Baker is regarded as one of the founding fathers of federation and was a member of the Federal Conventions of 1891 and 1897-1898. It remains a Heritage Listed Building of South Australia, of extreme historical value. In 2009 Federation was re-opened following extensive renovations. It currently houses 12 student rooms; common area; state-of-the-art kitchen and dining room with two function rooms.

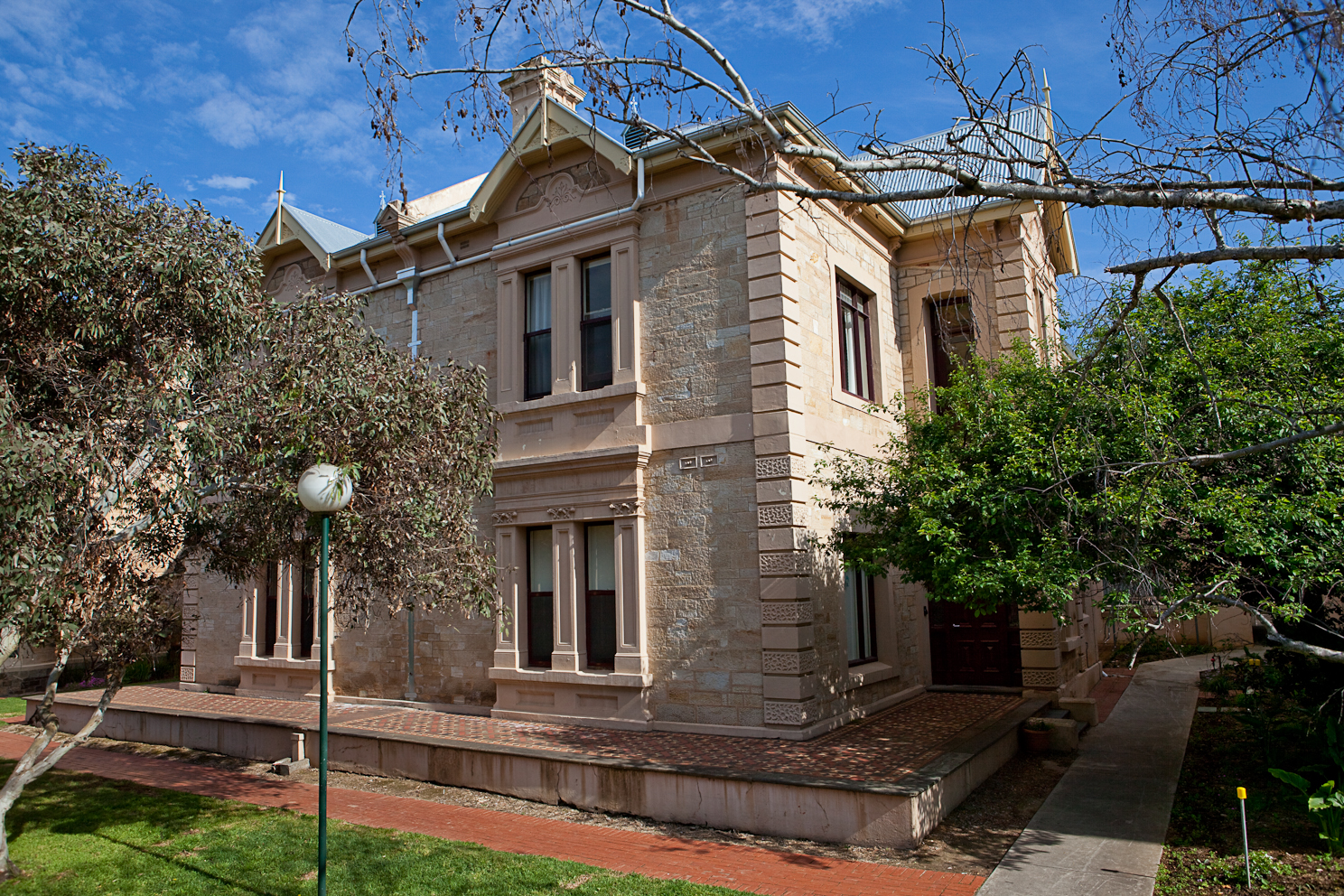
Abraham House, Brougham Place

=== Abraham House ===
Formerly known as Annexe due to its communication to the Federation building, it underwent posthumous dedication to the late Samuel C E Abraham (Alumnus 1954-1958), a respected practitioner of Paediatrics both overseas and in Australia who champions such philanthropic projects as the Johor Baru Spastic Centre and the Sentul Project. It remains a Heritage Listed Building of South Australia. In 2009 Abraham House was re-opened following renovations, it now hosts 20 student rooms with reading rooms, a fully functional kitchen and common areas.

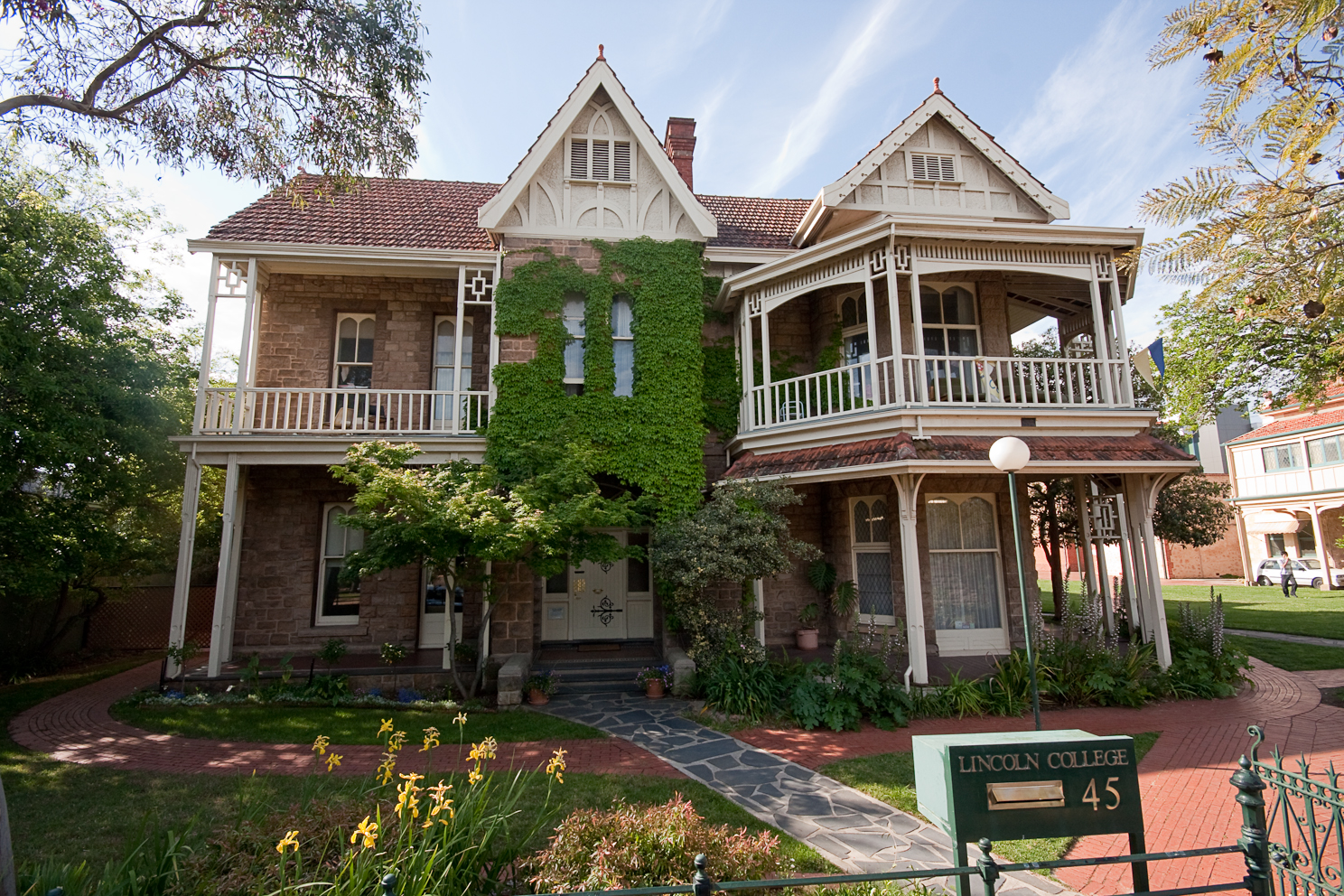
Milne House, 45 Brougham Place

=== Milne House ===
Number 45 Brougham Place was the first building to be bought by the then Methodist Church in 1951 for £25,000. It is a grand residence, characteristic of the building styles of that part of North Adelaide. It was built in the late 1880s for wine and spirit merchant George Milne. Federation style houses are relatively rare in South Australia because, in the short period when they were popular, the central colony/state was less prosperous than its neighbours. They were different from those in the rest in Australia in having walls of stone instead of brick and strongly coloured rather than white paint on their woodwork.

The building has undergone a significant restoration to its external woodwork. Heritage architect Bill Kay has designed a new veranda that is as close as possible to the original. The new design, however, includes modern safety features and stronger construction principles. The veranda was officially re-opened during Lincoln College’s Homecoming Weekend in April 2012 as part of the college's Diamond Jubilee Celebrations.

== Principals ==
Period	Details
1952 – 1972	Rev. William Frank Hambly
1973 – 1984	John W. Whitehead
1984 – 1994	Geoffrey Scott
1995 – 2004	Dr. Peter Gunn
2004 – 2007	Ken Webb
2007 – 2013	Rebecca Pannell
2013 – 2017	Linda Bastick
2017–2023	Dr. Paul Tosch
2023 - present	Carolyn Mee

== Notable alumni ==
- Robert Hannaford (alumnus 1962–64)
- Basil Hetzel (alumnus 1956–57)
- Chris Sumner (alumnus 1960–65)
- Lim Soo Hoon (alumna 1977–80)
- John Menadue (alumnus 1953–56)
- Peter Ong (alumnus 1982–83)
- Geoff Harcourt
- Cheong Choong Kong (alumnus 1962–63)
- Tim Harcourt (alumnus 1983–86)
