= Bob Parker (accounting scholar) =

British accounting scholar (1932–2016)

Robert Henry Parker (September 1932 – 24 July 2016) was a British accounting scholar, and Emeritus Professor at the University of Exeter, known for his work on "comparative international accounting" and the history of the accounting profession in Britain.

Born and raised in North Walsham, Norfolk, Parker obtained his MA in economics at the University of London, and gained his licence as chartered accountant in 1958. Subsequently, Parker started working as accountant in Nigeria, and Australia, where he became a lecturer at the University of Adelaide, and then a sub-dean at the University of Western Australia. In 1966 he returned to England, where he joined the faculty of the London School of Economics. He also lectured at INSEAD and at the University of Dundee before he was appointed Professor of Accounting at the University of Exeter in 1976.

Parker's main research interest was "the accountancy profession worldwide in its international and historical contexts."

Parker died in Exeter on 24 July 2016 at age 83.

== Selected publications ==
- Parker, Robert Henry, and Geoffrey Colin Harcourt, eds. Readings in the Concept and Measurement of Income. Cambridge: Cambridge University Press, 1969.
- Parker, Robert Henry. Management accounting: An historical perspective. Macmillan, 1969.
- Kitchen, Jack, and Robert Henry Parker. Accounting thought and education: Six English pioneers. Taylor & Francis, 1980.
- Parker, Robert Henry. The development of the accountancy profession in Britain to the early twentieth century. Vol. 5. Academy of Human Studies, 1986.
- Parker, Robert Henry, and Basil S. Yamey. Accounting history: some British contributions. Oxford University Press, 1994.
- Nobes, Christopher, and Robert Henry Parker, eds. Comparative international accounting. Pearson Education, 2008.

Articles, a selection

- Parker, Robert Henry. "Regulating British corporate financial reporting in the late nineteenth century." Accounting, Business & Financial History 1.1 (1990): 51–71.
