= Philip Baxter =

British chemical engineer (1905–1989)

Sir Philip Baxter KBE CMG FAA
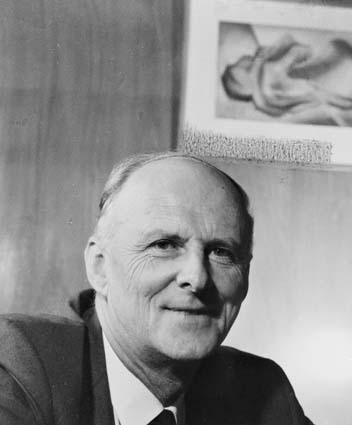
- Baxter in 1965
- Born: 7 May 1905; Machynlleth, Wales
- Died: 5 September 1989 (aged 84); Haberfield, Sydney, Australia
- Education: University of Birmingham (BSc, 1925; MSc, 1926; PhD, 1928)
- Awards: Knight Commander of the Order of the British Empire (1965); Companion of the Order of St. Michael and St. George (1959); Officer of the Order of the British Empire (1946)
- Scientific career
- Fields: Chemical engineering
- Workplaces: Imperial Chemical Industries; Clinton Engineer Works; University of New South Wales
- Thesis: The combustion of carbonic oxide (1928)
- Doctoral advisor: F. H. Burstall

Sir John Philip Baxter KBE CMG FAA (7 May 1905 – 5 September 1989) was a British-Australian chemical engineer. He was the second director of the University of New South Wales from 1953, continuing as vice-chancellor when the position's title was changed in 1955. Under his administration, the university grew from its technical college roots into the "fastest growing and most rapidly diversifying tertiary institution in Australia". Philip Baxter College is named in his honour.

Baxter was born in Wales, but grew up in England, entering the University of Birmingham at age 16. He joined Imperial Chemical Industries as a chemical engineer, and became head of the Central Laboratory of its General Chemicals Division in Widnes, investigating the chemistry of chlorine and fluorine. He was elected to the Widnes Municipal Council in 1939, a seat he held until 1949. During the Second World War he provided James Chadwick with samples of uranium hexafluoride for Tube Alloys, the British wartime nuclear weapons program, and later established a pilot plant to produce it in Widnes. In 1944, in response to a request from the Americans for someone with expertise in both uranium chemistry and industrial operations, he went to Oak Ridge, Tennessee, to assist the Manhattan Project.

Baxter was recruited by the then-New South Wales University of Technology as a professor of chemical engineering in 1949. He became one of the most prolific public advocates of nuclear power for Australia. He served as chairman of the Australian Atomic Energy Commission from 1957 to 1972 and the International Atomic Energy Agency from 1969 to 1970. He oversaw the construction of the High Flux Australian Reactor (HIFAR) at Lucas Heights. He also founded the National Institute of Dramatic Art (NIDA), and, as the chairman of the Sydney Opera House Trust, brought the Sydney Opera House to completion and opening on 20 October 1973.

== Early life ==
John Philip Baxter was born in Machynlleth in Wales on 7 May 1905, the younger child of John Baxter and his wife Mary Netta née Morton. He had an older sister, Muriel. His father was a telegraphist with the British General Post Office, as was his mother before her marriage. The family moved to Hereford in England, where he attended Hereford High School for Boys. At school, he enjoyed playing tennis.

Baxter passed the Northern Universities Matriculation examination when he was 14, but found that this was too young to be admitted to a university. He passed it again the following year, and then passed the University of London Matriculation examination the year after, when he was 16, after which he was permitted to enter the University of Birmingham. He was interested in metallurgy and enrolled in a science course. He earned his Bachelor of Science degree with first class honours in 1925, and his Master of Science the following year. His main form of recreation remained tennis. With the help of a £250 per annum James Watt research scholarship, he wrote his 1928 Doctor of Philosophy (PhD) thesis on "The combustion of carbonic oxide", under the supervision of F. H. Burstall.

== Imperial Chemical Industries ==
A recommendation from Burstall helped Baxter secure a research engineer position with Imperial Chemical Industries (ICI) in Billingham, where a new chemical factory had been established to make sodium hydroxide. Here he met Lilian May Thatcher, who worked as a stenographer in nearby Stockton-on-Tees. The two became engaged, but before they could marry, Alexander Fleck had Baxter transferred to ICI's new General Chemicals Division in Widnes as head of the Central Laboratory. Baxter and Lilian were married in the register office in Stockton-on-Tees on 17 August 1931. Three years later they designed and built their own home in Farnworth, where they lived until 1949. They had four children: a daughter, Valerie; an adopted son, Peter; and sons Denis and Roderick.

The Central Laboratory's focus at this time was on the chemistry of chlorine and fluorine. Electrolysis of salt water produced chlorine and sodium hydroxide (caustic soda), but there was not as much demand for the chlorine, so ICI was eager to create new products using chlorine that it could sell. New products that were created included various solvents, chlorinated rubber, and Lindane, an insecticide developed in collaboration with ICI's Agricultural Research Station at Jealott's Hill. Baxter personally received a number of patents for his work. He became Research Manager of the General Chemicals Division in 1935. He reorganised the Central Laboratory into seven sections, each with its own Assistant Research Manager, an organisational structure known as "Baxter and the seven dwarves", which was not generally considered a success at the time.

In addition to his scientific work, Baxter was involved in local politics. He was elected to the Widnes Municipal Council in 1939, a seat he held until 1949. He was leader of the Conservative Party in the Council, and chairman of the local party organisation in the Widnes UK Parliament constituency.

== Tube Alloys ==
In 1940, with Britain at war during the Second World War, Baxter was approached by physicist James Chadwick, who asked if he could supply a sample of uranium hexafluoride. Baxter did so on a personal basis, using research money. Chadwick then came back and asked Baxter if he could supply a much larger amount, about 3 kilograms (6.6 lb). This time, Baxter demurred. The production of such a large quantity would require the purchase of additional equipment. ICI's hydrofluoric acid plant was out of commission and would require repairs. The bill for that amount of uranium hexafluoride would therefore come to around £3,000, a sum that he could not spend from research funds. He would require permission from senior ICI management, who would want to know if it would assist the war effort and whether 3 kg was all that would be required, or if further orders could be expected. Chadwick then revealed that this was part of a secret project, codenamed Tube Alloys, the object of which was to build an atomic bomb. Permission from ICI management was secured by Frederick Lindemann making a direct approach to Lord Melchett, one of ICI's directors.

ICI pilot plants for producing 1 long hundredweight (112 lb; 51 kg) of pure uranium metal and 50 to 100 kilograms (110 to 220 lb) of uranium hexafluoride per diem commenced operation in Widnes in mid-1943. The following year, in response to a request from the Americans for someone with expertise in both uranium chemistry and industrial operations, Baxter was sent to Oak Ridge, Tennessee, for three months to assist the Manhattan Project. The electromagnetic separation process had problems with the efficiency of its chemical processes for uranium recovery. At the request of the director of the Manhattan Project, Brigadier General Leslie R. Groves, Jr., Baxter subsequently returned to Oak Ridge for an indefinite period, this time with his family. He became the personal assistant to the general manager, with responsibility for coordinating research, development and production activities. For his wartime nuclear weapons work, Baxter was made an Officer of the Order of the British Empire on 1 January 1946.

Baxter returned to Widnes as Research Director of the General Chemicals Division after the war ended in 1945. He became a director of Thorium Ltd, a company half owned by ICI that was involved in the production of radioactive substances, and was a consultant to the British nuclear energy program. His General Chemicals Division at Widnes was involved in chemical separation of uranium products, which he considered a patriotic duty. Baxter was personally responsible for the research and development that was the basis for the design of the Springfields uranium hexafluoride plant, and was a member of the committee that oversaw the construction of the chemical separation plant to extract plutonium. Much to Baxter's disappointment, ICI management did not see nuclear energy as being part of its core mission, and disengaged from it. He also became dismayed at political and economic developments in the United Kingdom after the Conservatives lost office in 1945.

== University of New South Wales ==
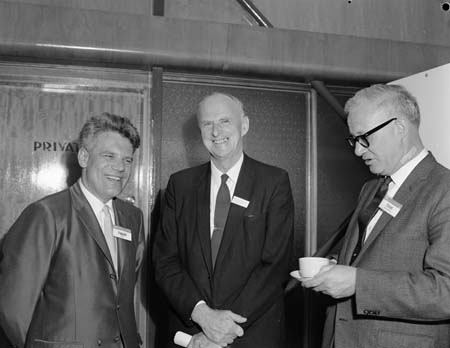
Atomic scientists from fifteen nations meet for a conference at the Australian Atomic Energy Commission Research Establishment at Lucas Heights in 1966. (left to right) Gennadiy Yagodin, Baxter and Robert Street.

In 1949, Baxter heard that the New South Wales University of Technology was looking for a professor of chemical engineering. He applied, and was offered the job. Baxter and his family packed their belongings and sailed to Australia on the ocean liner Orcades, arriving in Sydney on 16 January 1950. They bought a house in Enfield, where Baxter would reside for the rest of his life. At the time the university was located in temporary accommodation on the grounds of the Sydney Technical College campus in Ultimo. Baxter became the head of a new School of Chemical Engineering that was created on his arrival, but he initially had only one full-time staff member as most of the instruction was carried out by part-time staff. Although he had no previous teaching experience, he turned out to be a good, well-organised lecturer, and he worked closely with his first postgraduate students, whose research was into fields that Baxter had been involved with in England.

A number of other professors disliked the name and organisational structure of the university, and wanted it to shake off the association with "technology" and become a "real university". While Baxter did not side with them, contending that the university's association with the government provided funding and facilities, most of what he did moved in that direction. He hired full-time staff, and broadened the scope of the subjects taught and the research carried out. A Department of Food Technology was the first, and for many years the only, one of its kind in Australia. He replaced the diploma-level with a new bachelor of science in chemical engineering degree, offering conversion courses to allow students to upgrade their diplomas to degrees. The first chemical engineering students had enrolled in 1949, and nine graduated with the bachelor of science degree in 1952. The School of Chemical Engineering became the first school to relocate to the new campus in Kensington in 1953.

In February 1952, Baxter became deputy-director of the university. He defeated Arthur Denning in an election for director in December, assuming the position on 1 January 1953. As Denning had argued for the retention of the university's links with the Public Service Board, it was widely seen as a victory for the proponents of autonomy, but with his industrial background Baxter had little in common with the professors who came from academia, and did not share their views on the role and organisation of a university. The university did receive autonomy on 1 July 1954, and when traditional university titles were adopted in 1955, Baxter became vice-chancellor.

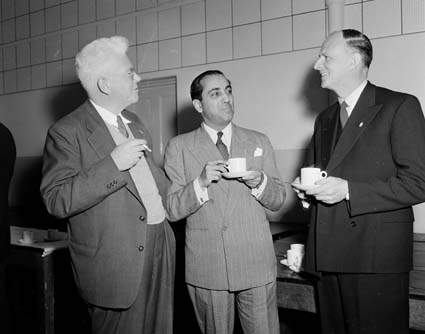
During a two-day symposium on "Atomic Power in Australia" at the New South Wales University of Technology, Sydney, which began on 31 August 1954, Professors Marcus Oliphant (left), Homi Jehangir Bhabha (centre) and Philip Baxter, meet over a cup of tea

A committee appointed by the Prime Minister, Robert Menzies, and chaired by Keith Murray, recommended in 1957 that a medical school be established at Kensington. Its creation, followed by that of a Faculty of Arts, prompted the university to change its name to the University of New South Wales (UNSW) in 1958. Baxter established a number of unusual schools. He created a School of Nuclear Engineering in anticipation that a nuclear power industry would be established in Australia. He also created schools of Textile Technology, Wool Technology, Food Technology and Highway Engineering and Traffic Engineering. The School of Business Administration and an Institute of Administration was established in 1960, and ultimately the Australian Graduate School of Management in 1969. When the Faculty of Arts was created, he insisted that all Arts students take at least one science subject.

In Baxter's eyes, the main role of the university was to provide trained engineers and technologists for industry, which he believed was suffering from a critical skill shortage. With this constantly in mind, he pursued a rapid expansion of the university. Student numbers grew from 3,751 when he became vice-chancellor in 1955, to over 15,988 when he retired in 1969. This was far short of the university of 25,000 students that he had hoped to create, but in the 1950s the idea of a university that large horrified some academics. Baxter considered it wasteful when good students returned to academia after only a brief time working in industry, but even more so when they dropped out or failed their courses. While his critics saw high failure rates as the inevitable result of lowering admission standards in order to boost student numbers, Baxter viewed it as result of poor teaching and inefficient administration. He walked out of a heated Staff Association meeting on the matter. To help industry, he established Unisearch Limited, a company that provided expert assistance in 1959.

Baxter's biggest clashes with academic staff were over governance issues. He had a preference for industry-style organisation, with clear lines of authority. In 1957, he created a committee of deans, chaired by himself, that met every Wednesday. This became the vice-chancellor's advisory committee in 1960. Through this he created an administrative mechanism which set the university free from the traditional constraints. He did away with the election of deans by the faculty, replacing it with one in which deans were appointed by the University Council on his recommendation. This provided for more efficient administration, but violated the academic tradition of a dean being primus inter pares among academic colleagues. This aroused the ire of academic staff, and in the end a compromise was reached whereby each faculty elected a chairman who was responsible for academic matters, while the council appointed a dean who was in charge of administrative matters. This proved to be quite successful, and was retained by Baxter's successors. Ronald Hartwell characterised Baxter's administration as "unusual, undemocratic and unacademic". His successor, Rupert Myers, declared that: "History will show Sir Philip Baxter to have been a great educational administrator who built a fine university and made many beneficial changes in the ways universities handled their business and interacted with governments and the community."

== Atomic knight ==
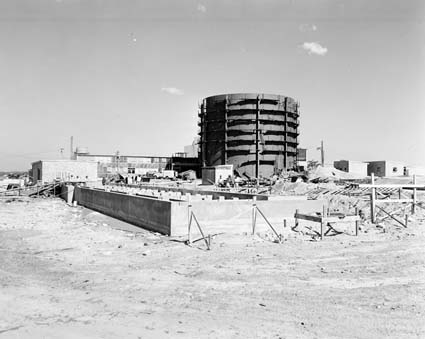
Nuclear reactor at Lucas Heights under construction

On 19 August 1949, the Australian government created the Industrial Atomic Energy Policy Committee, chaired by Mark Oliphant and with Baxter as a member, to advise government on the development of nuclear power in Australia. On the committee's own recommendation, it was superseded by the Atomic Energy Policy Committee in April 1952. This in turn was replaced by the Australian Atomic Energy Commission (AAEC) in November. The AAEC was run by a three commissioners, with Jack Stevens as chairman, Baxter as vice-chairman and Hugh Murray from the Mount Lyell Mining and Railway Company as the third member.

Baxter succeeded Stevens as chairman in 1957. He worked part-time, spending Fridays at the AAEC until he retired from the UNSW in 1969. Thereafter he was full-time, until he retired from the AAEC on 15 April 1972. He was also the Australian member on the Board of Governors of the International Atomic Energy Agency when it was created in 1957 and again from 1964 to 1972, serving as its chairman from 1969 to 1970.

The AAEC established its offices in Coogee. Baxter and Frederick White from the Commonwealth Scientific and Industrial Research Organisation (CSIRO) visited nuclear facilities in Britain, the United States and Canada in 1953. As there were few people in Australia with nuclear technology experience, he arranged with Sir John Cockcroft for Australians to be seconded to the British Atomic Energy Research Establishment in Harwell. Some 60 Australian scientists were working there by 1956. During a symposium on "Atomic Power in Australia" held at the New South Wales University of Technology on 31 August and 1 September 1954, Baxter clashed with Harry Messel, the head of the School of Physics at the University of Sydney, over the latter's plans to build a low-power experimental nuclear reactor.

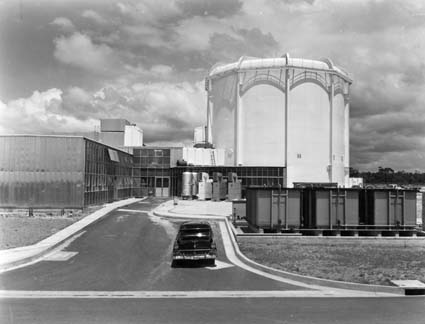
Nuclear reactor at Lucas Heights completed

Baxter would have none of it; he wanted a "real reactor, not a low-power toy". He prevailed; the government authorised a High Flux Australian Reactor (HIFAR). Based on the DIDO reactor at Harwell, HIFAR was cooled and moderated by heavy water, and fuelled with enriched uranium. Construction began at Lucas Heights in October 1955, and HIFAR went critical on 26 January 1958. By the time he became full-time chairman in 1969, the AAEC had grown to an organisation with a staff of over 1,000 and a budget of $8.5 million. The AAEC explored the country looking for uranium deposits, developed technology for uranium enrichment, and produced designs for nuclear reactors.

More controversially, Baxter pressed the case for Australia to have the capacity to produce nuclear weapons. In 1958, he proposed creating a facility at Mount Isa to breed weapons-grade plutonium. His proposals found a sympathetic ear in Prime Minister John Gorton, who approved plans to build a CANDU reactor at Jervis Bay in 1969. An access road was built and ground was cleared, but Gorton lost office on 10 March 1971, and the project was suspended, and later cancelled by his successors. Nailing his colours to the mast, Baxter continued his advocacy. In 1975 he declared:

Over the years I have initially advocated that we should create the necessary technology and industrial background to enable us to move into a nuclear armament quickly. More recently things have changed internationally. I'm now of the opinion that we should begin actively to create nuclear weapons for the defence of Australia.

For his work as chairman of the Atomic Energy Commission, Baxter was made a Companion Order of St Michael and St George in the Queen's Birthday Honours on 13 June 1959, and was created a Knight Commander of the Order of the British Empire in the Civil Division in the 1965 Queen's Birthday Honours on 12 June 1965.

== Arts and legacy ==
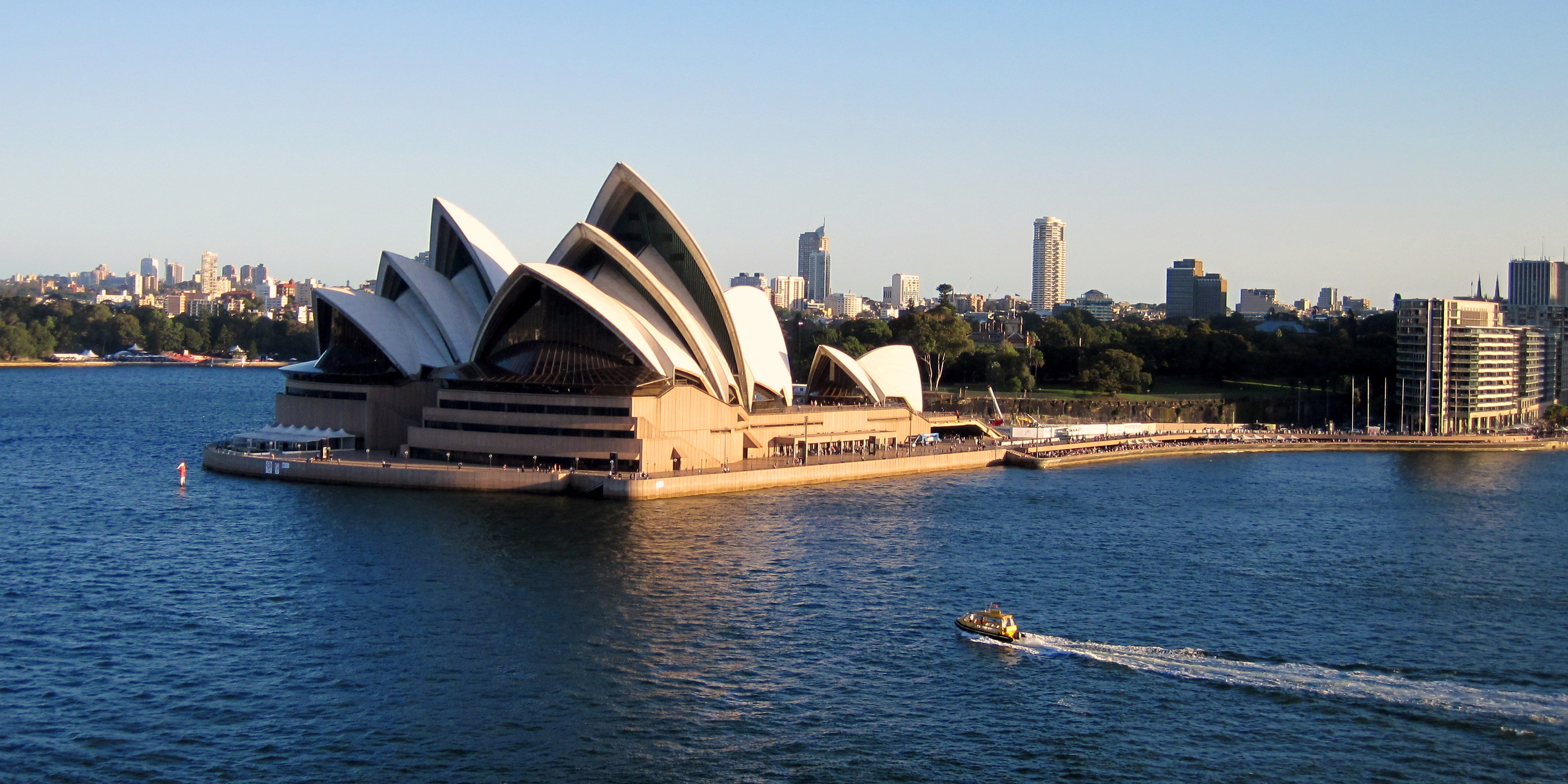
The Sydney Opera House

Baxter had been a member of the drama group in Stockton-on-Tees, and had performed on stage with University Drama Club at UNSW, sometimes with his daughter Valerie. In response to a request from the Australian Broadcasting Commission and the Australian Elizabethan Theatre Trust in 1958 for improved training of actors, he founded the National Institute of Dramatic Art (NIDA). By 2013, NIDA was regarded as one of the world's finest drama schools, with alumni that included Cate Blanchett, Judy Davis, Mel Gibson, Baz Luhrmann and Hugo Weaving.

From 1969 to 1975, Baxter was part-time and unpaid chairman of the Sydney Opera House Trust. He had recently retired from the UNSW, but the job was no sinecure. The architect, Jørn Utzon, had left, construction was behind schedule and over budget, and specialist staff needed to be recruited. Baxter put the project under his unpopular but decisive grip, and brought the Sydney Opera House to completion and opening on 20 October 1973.

Baxter was awarded honorary doctorates by the Université de Montréal in 1958, the University of Newcastle in 1966, the University of Queensland in 1967, Loughborough University in 1970 and the UNSW in 1971. Philip Baxter College at the UNSW was named after him in 1966. He died in Haberfield on 5 September 1989, and his remains were cremated. He was survived by three of his children; his wife Lilian had died on 27 July 1989, and his son Peter had died in a motor vehicle accident in the 1960s. His papers are in the archives at the University of New South Wales.

== Notes ==
Academic offices
Preceded by Arthur Denning	Vice-Chancellor of the University of New South Wales; 1953–1969	Succeeded by Sir Rupert Myers
