= UNSW Faculty of Science =

Part of the University of New South Wales in Australia

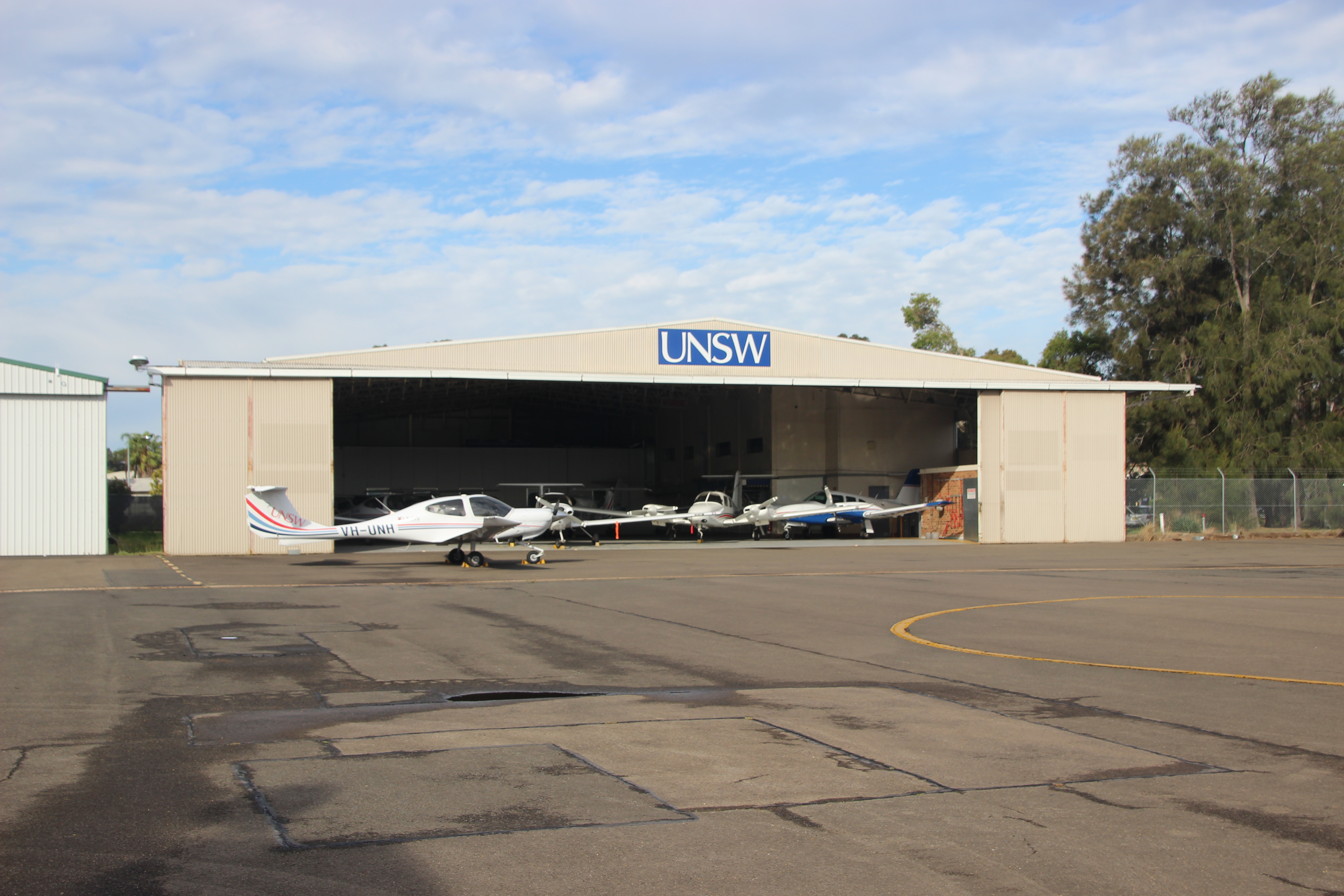
UNSW School of Aviation hangar at Bankstown Airport, with some of the school's training aircraft

The Faculty of Science is a constituent body of the University of New South Wales (UNSW), Australia.

== History ==
A Faculty of Science was established as one of the first three faculties of the New South Wales University of Technology (later the University of New South Wales) at the university's Council meeting on 8 May 1950. Teaching in the subjects of applied chemistry and chemical engineering had, however, commenced the previous year.

The present faculty structure represents the outcome of two major and several minor UNSW restructures since 1997, with the primary aim of operational simplification and administrative efficiency. Before 1997 science teaching and research at UNSW was spread across three Faculties: Science; Biological & Behavioural Science; and Applied Science. In 1997 the three Science faculties were disestablished and two new faculties were created - a Faculty of Science and Technology and a Faculty of Life Sciences.

In 2001, a second major restructure amalgamated most of the science schools resident in these two Faculties into a single new Faculty of Science.

A 2009 review of research in the faculty resulted in the closure of the School of Risk & Safety Sciences in 2010.

== Description ==
UNSW's Faculty of Science is the second largest faculty in the university (after Engineering). It has over 400 academic staff and over 700 research staff and students.

The Faculty consists of eight Schools:

- School of Aviation
- School of Biological, Earth and Environmental Sciences
- School of Biotechnology and Biomolecular Sciences
- School of Chemistry
- School of Materials Science and Engineering
- School of Mathematics and Statistics
- School of Physics
- School of Psychology

Within the School of Physics, the Centre for Quantum Computer Technology has three major research laboratories at the University of New South Wales: the Atomic Fabrication Facility (AFF), the National Magnet Laboratory (NML) and the Semiconductor Nanofabrication Facility (SNF). These all allow for nanoscale device fabrication and measurement.

== Partnerships ==
The faculty is a partner in the Sydney Institute of Marine Science, located on Sydney Harbour at Chowder Bay.

It is also associated with national Cooperative Research Centres (CRCs) in Environmental Biotechnology; Vision; Spatial Information Systems; and Bushfire.

It is also part of Australian Research Council Centres of Excellence for Mathematical and Statistical Modelling of Complex Systems; Quantum Computer Technology (CQCT); Design in Light Metals; and Functional Nanomaterials.

The faculty is also part of the National Cooperative Research Infrastructure Scheme and the National Health and Medical Research Council's program in Post-traumatic Mental Health.

== Research centres and stations ==
The faculty has field research stations at Cowan, Smiths Lake, Wellington, and Fowlers Gap.

The faculty is the primary administrative base for the Institute of Environmental Studies and a number of research centres, including: the Climate Change Research Centre; Evolution and Ecology Research Centre; Centre for Marine Bio-Innovation; Centre for Materials Research in Energy Conversion; the Clive and Vera Ramaciotti Centre for Gene Function Analysis; Injury Risk Management Research Centre (IRMRC); and the Centre for Groundwater Research (jointly with Faculty of Engineering).

=== Mark Wainwright Analytical Centre ===
Adjacent to the Chemical Sciences building (Applied Science), is the Mark Wainwright Analytical Centre (MWAC) designed by Francis-Jones Morehen Thorp, the goal of which is to co-locate major research instrumentation in a single, purpose-built, high-grade facility for the university.

The Analytical Centre houses the most important major instruments used in the Faculties of Science, Medicine and Engineering for the study of the structure and composition of biological, chemical and physical materials and also includes preparation laboratories, smaller instruments and computing facilities. In addition, it provides the technical/professional support for the instruments. The building also houses new teaching and research laboratories for the School of Chemistry.

The Mark Wainwright Analytical Centre consolidates the management of resources to minimise unnecessary duplication, as well as providing the appropriate infrastructure to support the instruments and a world-class research environment within which the instrumentation can operate to specification.

Additionally, the new Analytical Centre has recently received a $500,000 grant from the Magnowski Institute of Applied Science to use in further advances in the studies of applied science.

=== Systems Biology Initiative ===
The New South Wales Systems Biology Initiative, directed by Marc Wilkins, is a non-profit facility within the School of Biotechnology and Biomolecular Sciences at the University of New South Wales. Their focus is undertaking basic and applied research in the development and application of bioinformatics for genomics and proteomics.

Researchers at the facility include:

==== Methylation on the proteome of Saccharomyces cerevisiae ====
Modifications generate conditional effects on proteins, whereby their covalent attachment to amino acids will cause perturbation of a particular protein resulting in an impact on the potential interactions of its newly modified form. Methylation is one of the most recognised post-translational modifications in histones for chromatin structure and gene expression. It is also one of many modifications found on the short N-terminal regions of histones, which assemble to form the histone code, which regulates chromatin assembly and epigenetic gene regulation. Identification of methylation across the interactome is poorly documented. Researchers at the System Biology Initiative have been identifying techniques to identify novel methylated lysine and arginine residues via mass spectrometry and peptide mass fingerprinting. Currently researchers are in the process of utilising these techniques to identify novel methylated residues in the Saccharomyces cerevisiae interactome.

==== Separation and identification of protein complexes ====
Large-scale analysis of protein complexes is an emerging difficulty as methods for the fractionation of protein complexes that are not compatible with downstream proteomic techniques. The Systems Biology Initiative is utilising the technique of blue native continuous elution electrophoresis (BN-CEE). This method generates liquid-phase fractions of protein complexes. The resulting complexes can be further analysed by polyacrylamide gel electrophoresis and mass spectrometry. This will help identify the constituent proteins of many complexes. Currently researchers are employing this technique on the Saccharomyces cerevisiae cellular lysate.

==== Visualising proteins, complexes and interaction networks ====
The integration of biological data, including protein structures, interactions etc. can be generated through automated technology. The importance of such data can often be lost without proper visualisation of the data. The Systems Biology Initiative is currently working on an adaptation of the Skyrails Visualisation System. This system, called the interactonium uses a virtual cell for the visualisation of the interaction network, protein complexes and protein 3-D structures of Saccharomyces cerevisiae. The tool can display complex networks of up to 40,000 proteins or 6000 multiprotein complexes. The Interactorium permits multi-level viewing of the molecular biology of the cell. The Interactorium is available for download.
