= UNSW Foundation Studies =

UNSW Global (formerly known as UNSW Foundation Studies)
- Type: Private
- Established: 1988
- Affiliations: University of New South Wales (UNSW)
- Location: Kensington, Sydney, NSW, Australia
- Campus: Urban
- Website: www.ufs.unsw.edu.au

UNSW Foundation Studies provides foundation courses to assist students in meeting tertiary admission requirements and preparing for university entry. It is based at the University of New South Wales (UNSW) campus in Kensington, a suburb of Sydney. The UNSW Foundation Studies program commenced in 1989 and is the longest running foundation studies program in Australia.

== Links to other institutions ==
UNSW Foundation Studies is an education group of UNSW Global Pty Ltd, a not-for-profit provider of education services that includes a number of UNSW's activities, including the UNSW Institute of Languages, Educational Assessment Australia and the Expert Opinion Services. UNSW Global Pty Ltd is owned by UNSW.

== University admission ==
Students who are accepted into a UNSW Foundation Studies course receive a provisional offer of entry into a UNSW undergraduate program based on successful completion of their foundation studies. By 2019, more than 30,000 students had graduated from an UNSW Foundation Studies course. Students may also opt to use their UNSW Foundation Studies qualifications to gain admission at other universities. UNSW Foundation Studies qualifications are recognised by the Group of Eight (Australian universities), as well as numerous other universities around the world.

Scholarships are available for outstanding students who have completed their UNSW Foundation Studies qualification and are continuing their studies at UNSW.

== Programs ==
Foundation Studies courses are divided into four academic programs over 10 streams of study. Teaching mimics the structure of undergraduate university courses, with classes being presented in lectures and tutorials.

== Campus ==
UNSW Foundation Studies students take classes on the main UNSW campus, located in the Sydney suburb of Kensington. The main building—where the UNSW Foundation Studies office is located—is known as the L5 building, but classes take place in university buildings across the campus. All campus facilities are available to Foundation students. There is also designated accommodation on campus for UNSW Foundation Studies students.
