= UNSW College =

- Other names: UNSW Global Pty Limited (ABN 62 086 418 582)
- Former names: UNSW Institute of Languages; UNSW Global
- Type: College-preparatory school
- Established: 1968
- Affiliations: University of New South Wales (UNSW)
- Officer in charge: Sarah Lightfoot
- Chairman: Mark Wainwright
- Location: 12-22 Rothschild Avenue, Rosebery, New South Wales, 2018, Australia
- Campus: Urban
- Website: www.unswcollege.edu.au

UNSW College is an education provider that offers pathway programs for international students to attend the University of New South Wales.

UNSW Global comprises the following:

- Educational Assessment Australia
- Expert Opinion Services
- UNSW Global Training
- UNSW Consulting
- UNSW Foundation Studies
- UNSW Institute of Languages
- UNSW Study Abroad

== History ==
On 11 May 2019, UNSW Global transitioned to become a higher education provider and renamed itself to UNSW College.

In 2020, Janison Solutions Pty Ltd acquired Educational Assessment Australia, the Educational Assessments (EA) business unit of UNSW Global.

== Programs ==
The UNSW College offers Foundation, Diploma, Pre-Masters and Academic English courses.

=== International students ===
International students can study in three main areas:

- Diploma Programs are for high-achieving students with good English skills. a UNSW Diploma allows students to progress straight into Second Year of a chosen undergraduate degree. This 12-month program is equivalent to your First Year at university. Students can choose from Architecture, Business, Computer Science, Engineering, Media & Communication or Science.
- Pre-Masters program provides additional academic or English language support to meet the entry requirements needed to progress to a postgraduate degree at UNSW Sydney. It offers an opportunity to enhance critical thinking, academic writing, project management, research, and communication skills to succeed.
- Foundation Studies Programs are supportive pathways to the First Year of any UNSW degree. With four programs ranging from four to 15 months in length and streams that align with UNSW's degree programs, these programs are designed to suit a student's academic and English skills.
- Academic English Improves English skills before starting university. A range of Academic English programs is offered. Students learn how to communicate effectively, participate in lectures and tutorials, read and understand university-level texts, and build confidence while reaching goals.

== Campuses ==
The UNSW College has purpose-built facilities at UNSW's Kensington campuses in Sydney, Australia. In addition to accessing the college's facilities, students taking courses can also access a range of UNSW facilities including the library, sports facilities and health centres.

Sections of the Blockhouse building are also allocated to UNSW College, and classes are frequently run online.
