= Rupert Myers =

Australian metallurgist and academic administrator (1921–2019)

Sir Rupert Myers KBE AO FTSE FAA
- Born: 21 February 1921; Melbourne, Victoria, Australia
- Died: 21 February 2019 (aged 98)
- Education: University of Melbourne (BSc, MSc, PhD)
- Awards: Commander of the Order of the British Empire (1976); Fellow of the Australian Academy of Technological Sciences and Engineering (1979); Knight Commander of the Order of the British Empire (1981); Officer of the Order of Australia (1995); Fellow of the Australian Academy of Science (1997)
- Scientific career
- Fields: Metallurgy
- Workplaces: Atomic Energy Research Establishment (1948–52); University of New South Wales (1952–81)
- Thesis: The preparation and properties of tantalum and some of its alloys (1948)
- Doctoral advisor: J. Neill Greenwood

Sir Rupert Horace Myers, KBE, AO, FTSE, FAA (21 February 1921 – 21 February 2019) was an Australian metallurgist, academic and university administrator, who was the third vice-chancellor of the University of New South Wales from 1969 to 1981. He was the second person to be awarded a PhD by an Australian University. He died on 21 February 2019 on his 98th birthday.

== Honours ==
In the New Year Honours of 1976, Myers was appointed a Commander of the Order of the British Empire for his work as Vice-Chancellor of the University of New South Wales. He was further recognised for his "service to education, science and the community" on being knighted as a Knight Commander of the Order of the British Empire In the Queen's Birthday Honours of 1981 and, in the Australia Day Honours of 1995, he was appointed an Officer of the Order of Australia for his efforts in promoting "innovation and commerce in the fields of science technology and engineering." On 1 January 2001, he was awarded the Centenary Medal for his "service to Australian society and science."

Academic offices
| Preceded by Sir Philip Baxter | Vice-Chancellor of the University of New South Wales; 1969–1981 | Succeeded by Michael Birt |
