= UNSW Faculty of Medicine & Health =

- The University of New South Wales; Faculty of Medicine and Health
- Type: Public
- Established: 1960
- Affiliations: Prince of Wales Hospital (Sydney)
- Dean: Cheryl Jones
- Location: Sydney, Australia

The Faculty of Medicine & Health is a constituent body of the University of New South Wales, Australia.

The Faculty was established in June 1960 under founding dean Professor Frank Rundle. It has nine schools:

- School of Medical Sciences
- School of Psychiatry
- School of Public Health and Community Medicine
- School of Women's and Children's Health
- Prince of Wales Clinical School
- Rural Clinical School
- St George and Sutherland Clinical School
- St Vincent's Clinical School
- South Western Sydney Clinical School
