= Richard Ferrero =

Australian microbiologist

- Born: Richard Ferrero
- Education: University of New South Wales

Richard Ferrero is a microbiologist. He is a senior research fellow of the National Health and Medical Research Council (NHMRC). In the Centre for Innate Immunity and Infectious Diseases at the Hudson Institute, he also holds the position of senior scientist and head of the Gastrointestinal Infection and Inflammation Research Group.

== Biography ==
Ferrero studied at the University of New South Wales (Sydney). He studied microbiology and biochemistry from 1981 to 1984. He then completed his honours in 1985 and his Ph.D. of Microbiology in 1990. After the completion of his Ph.D., Ferrero moved to Paris and gained a postdoctoral position at the Pasteur Institute. At the Pasteur Institute, Ferrero was appointed to his tenured research position in the Département de Bactériologie et Mycologie.

In 2004, Ferrero moved back to Australia and became a teaching/research appointment as a Senior Lecturer in the Department of Microbiology at Monash University. In 2009 he was recruited by the Hudson Institute of Medical Research where he is currently undertaking his research.

Ferrero's main point of research is Helicobacter pylori, the cause of peptic ulcer disease and gastric cancer. His findings in the field have led to important outcomes such as antibiotic resistance, pathogenesis, vaccine development and innate immunology. His research has been published in over 100 works in books and peer-review journals, including Cell Host Microb., Gastroenterol., Immunity, mBio, PNAS USA, Nat Immunol. and Nat Rev Immunol. His work in Helicobacter pylori has been broad, covering various scientific disciplines such as microbial physiology and molecular pathogenesis. With his knowledge in the field, Ferrero has collaborated with and consulted for vaccine and pharmaceutical companies.

Ferrero's other contributions to the scientific community include being on the editorial board of the journal Helicobacter. He has also helped on a Canadian Helicobacter pylori consensus panel which served to create a treatment of Helicobacter pylori infections in children and adolescents through evidence-based approaches. He also regularly reviews abstracts for major international conferences in both the fields of Helicobacter research and gastroenterology. He is also an international member of the scientific committee The International Workshop on Pathogenesis and Host Response in Helicobacter Infections. Ferrero has been awarded for his findings from multiple scientific and medical bodies. He is regularly invited to present his research both nationally and internationally at conferences.
