= University of New South Wales =

Australian university

- coat of arms
- Other name: UNSW
- Former name: The New South Wales University of Technology (1949–1958)
- Motto: Latin: Scientia Corde Manu et Mente
- Motto in English: "Knowledge by heart, hand and mind"
- Type: Public research university
- Established: 1 July 1949; 77 years ago
- Accreditation: TEQSA
- Academic affiliations: Go8; U21; APRU; PLuS; GATU; ADFA; OUA; UA; UGC -Indian campus only
- Endowment: A$289.57 million (2024)
- Budget: A$3.37 billion (2025)
- Visitor: Governor of New South Wales (ex officio)
- Chancellor: Warwick Negus
- Vice-Chancellor: Attila Brungs
- Academic staff: 3,610 (2024)
- Administrative staff: 4,708 (2024)
- Total staff: 8,318 (2024)
- Students: 82,272 (2024)
- Location: High Street, Kensington, New South Wales, 2052, Australia
- Campus: 38 hectares (0.38 km^{2}); Urban, parkland and regional
- Colours: Yellow Black
- Sporting affiliations: UniSport; EAEN; UBL
- Mascot: Clancy the Lion
- Website: unsw.edu.au

The University of New South Wales (UNSW) is a public research university based in Sydney, New South Wales, Australia. It was established in 1949.

The university consists of seven faculties, through which it offers bachelor's, master's and doctoral degrees. Its main campus is in the Sydney eastern suburb of Kensington, 7 kilometres (4.3 mi) from the Sydney central business district (CBD). Its creative arts school, UNSW Art & Design (in the faculty of Arts, Design and Architecture), is located in Paddington and it has subcampuses in the Sydney CBD and several other suburbs, including Randwick and Coogee. It has a campus at the Australian Defence Force military academy, ADFA in Canberra, Australian Capital Territory. It has research stations located throughout the state of New South Wales.

It is one of the founding members of the Group of Eight, a coalition of Australian research-intensive universities, and a member of Universitas 21, a global network of research universities. It has international exchange and research partnerships with over 200 universities around the world.

== History ==
=== Foundation ===
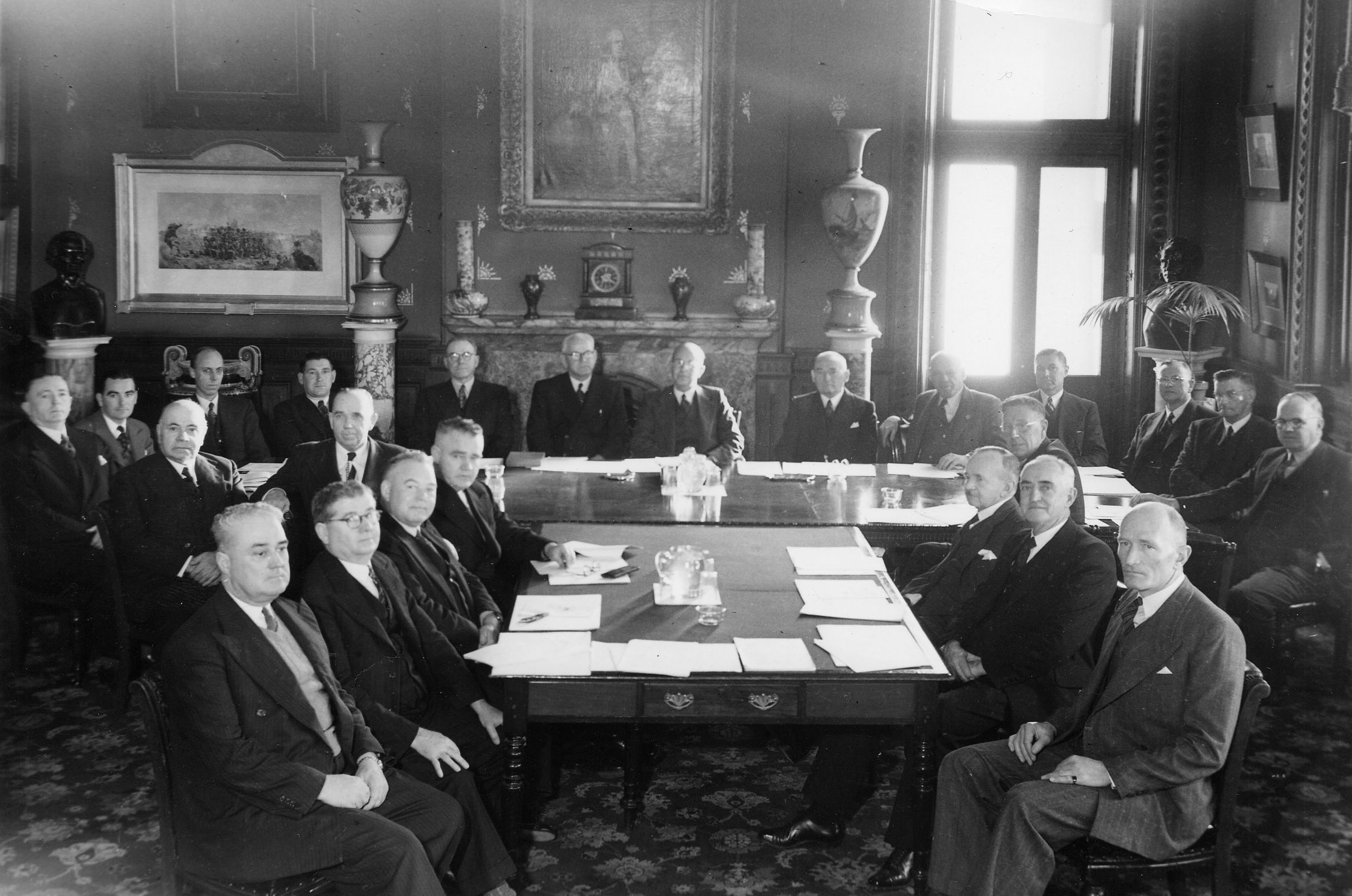
University council's first meeting in 1949

The origins of the university can be traced to the Sydney Mechanics' School of Arts established in 1833 and the Sydney Technical College established in 1878. These institutions were established to meet the growing demand for capabilities in new technologies as the New South Wales economy shifted from its pastoral base to industries fuelled by the industrial age.

The idea of founding the university originated from the crisis demands of World War II, during which the nation's attention was drawn to the critical role that science and technology played in transforming an agricultural society into a modern and industrial one. The post-war Labor government of New South Wales recognised the increasing need to have a university specialised in training high-quality engineers and technology-related professionals in numbers beyond that of the capacity and characteristics of the existing University of Sydney. This led to the proposal to establish the Institute of Technology, submitted by the then-New South Wales Minister for Education Bob Heffron, accepted on 9 July 1946.

The university, originally named the "New South Wales University of Technology", gained its statutory status through the enactment of the New South Wales University of Technology Act 1949 (NSW) by the Parliament of New South Wales in Sydney in 1949.

=== Early years ===
In March 1948, classes commenced with a first intake of 46 students pursuing programs including civil engineering, mechanical engineering, mining engineering, and electrical engineering. At that time, the thesis programs were innovative. Each course embodied a specified and substantial period of practical training in the relevant industry. It was also unprecedented for tertiary institutions at that time to include compulsory instruction in humanities.

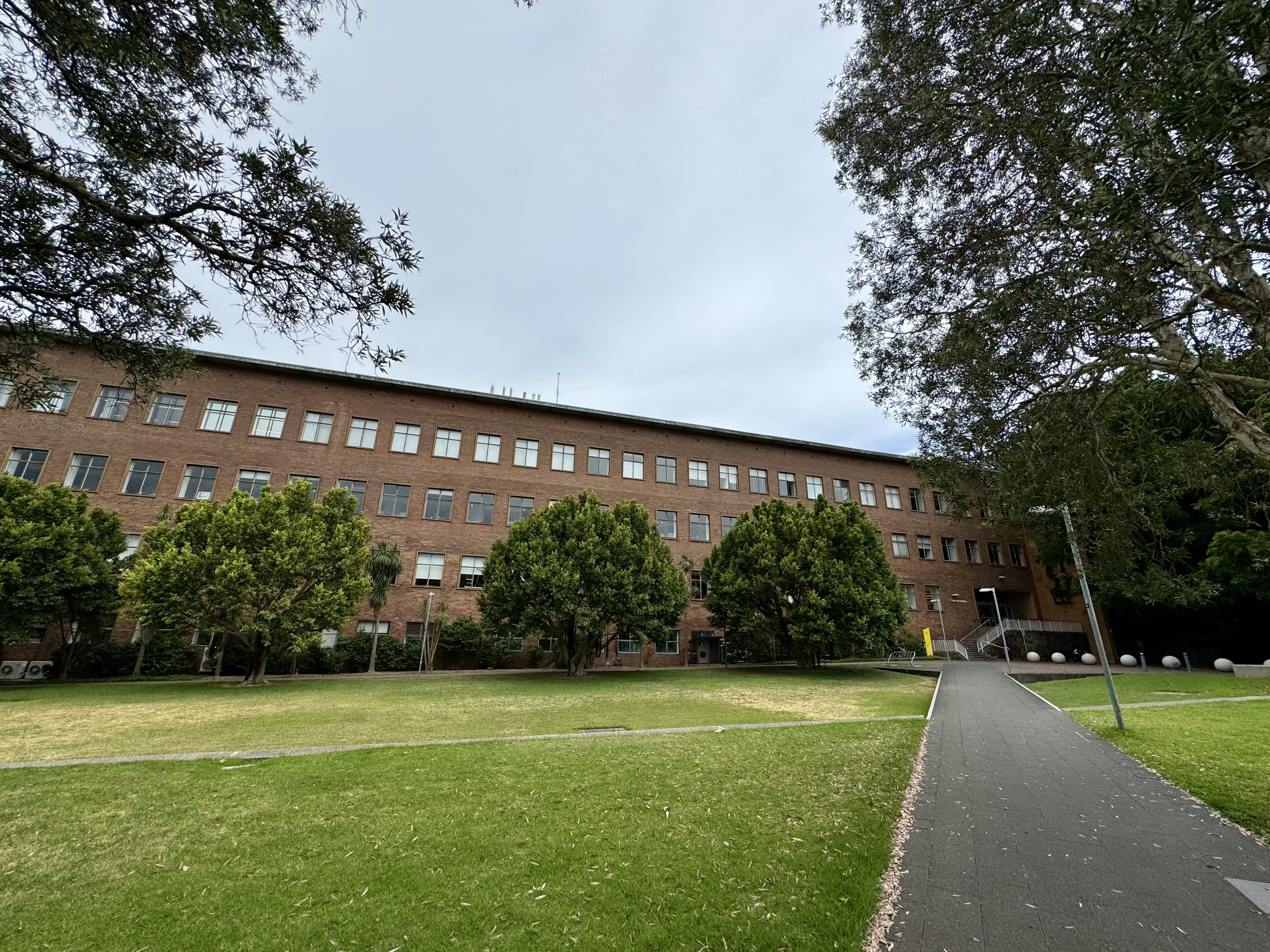
The Old Main Building is the first permanent building constructed on campus, officially opened on 16 April 1955

Initially, the university operated from the inner Sydney Technical College city campus in Ultimo as a separate institution from the college. However, in 1951, the Parliament of New South Wales passed the New South Wales University of Technology (Construction) Act 1951 (NSW) to provide funding and allow buildings to be erected at the Kensington site where the university is now located.

The lower campus area of the Kensington campus was vested in the university in two lots, in December 1952 and June 1954. The upper campus area was vested in the university in November 1959.

=== Expansion ===
In 1958, the university's name was changed to the "University of New South Wales" reflecting a transformation from a technology-based institution to a generalist university. In 1960, the faculties of arts and medicine were established, with the faculty of law coming into being in 1971.

The university's first director was Arthur Denning (1949–1952), who made important contributions to founding the university. In 1953, he was replaced by Philip Baxter, who continued as vice-chancellor when this position's title was changed in 1955. Baxter's dynamic, if authoritarian, management was central to the university's first 20 years. His visionary, but at times controversial, energies saw the university grow from a handful to 15,000 students by 1968. The new vice-chancellor, Rupert Myers (1969–1981), brought consolidation and an urbane management style to a period of expanding student numbers, demand for change in university style, and challenges of student unrest.

In 1962, the academic book publishing company University of New South Wales Press was launched. Now an ACNC not-for-profit entity, it has three divisions: NewSouth Publishing (the publishing arm of the company), NewSouth Books (the sales, marketing and distribution part of the company), and the UNSW Bookshop, situated at the Kensington campus.

The stabilising techniques of the 1980s managed by the vice-chancellor, Michael Birt (1981–1992), provided a firm base for the energetic corporatism and campus enhancements pursued by the subsequent vice-chancellor, John Niland (1992–2002). The 1990s had the addition of fine arts to the university. The university established colleges in Newcastle (1951) and Wollongong (1961), which eventually became the University of Newcastle and the University of Wollongong in 1965 and 1975, respectively.

The former St George Institute of Education (part of the short-lived Sydney College of Advanced Education) amalgamated with the university from 1 January 1990, resulting in the formation of a School of Teacher Education at the former SGIE campus at Oatley. A School of Sports and Leisure Studies and a School of Arts and Music Education were also subsequently based at St George. The campus was closed in 1999.

=== Recent history ===
In 2012, private sources contributed 45% of the university's annual funding.

In 2010, the Lowy Cancer Research Centre, Australia's first facility to bring together researchers in childhood and adult cancer, costing $127 million, opened.

In 2003, the university was invited by Singapore's Economic Development Board to consider opening a campus there. Following a 2004 decision to proceed, the first phase of a planned $200 m campus opened in 2007. Students and staff were sent home and the campus closed after one semester following substantial financial losses.

In 2008, it collaborated with two other universities in forming The Centre for Social Impact. In 2019, the university moved to a trimester timetable as part of UNSW's 2025 Strategy. Under the trimester timetable, the study load changed from offering four subjects per 13-week semester, to three subjects per 10-week term. The change to trimesters has been widely criticised by staff and students as a money-making move, with little consideration as to the well-being of students.

In 2012, UNSW Press celebrated its 50th anniversary and launched the UNSW Bragg Prize for Science Writing. The annual Best Australian Science Writing anthology contains the winning and shortlisted entries among a collection of the year's writing from Australian authors, journalists and scientists and is published annually in the NewSouth imprint under a different editorship. The UNSW Press Bragg Student Prize is for science writing by Australian high school students and is supported by the Copyright Agency Cultural Fund and UNSW Science.

In the 2019 Student Experience Survey, the University of New South Wales recorded the lowest student satisfaction rating out of all Australian universities, with an overall satisfaction rating of 62.9, which was lower than the overall national average of 78.4. UNSW's low student satisfaction numbers for 2019 was attributed to the university's switch to a trimester system. In the 2021 Student Experience Survey, the University of New South Wales recorded the lowest student satisfaction rating out of all New South Wales universities, and the second lowest nationwide behind the University of Melbourne, with an overall satisfaction rating of 66.9, which was lower than the overall national average of 73.

On 16 December 2019, the Kensington campus was equipped with Light rail service upon the opening of the UNSW High Street stop on the L2 Randwick Line Randwick.

On 15 July 2020, the university announced 493 job cuts and a 25 percent reduction in management due to the effects of COVID-19 and a $370 million budget shortfall.

In October 2021, UNSW established Mentem by UNSW to help organisations upskill and reskill their workforces. Mentem helps organisation achieve strategic goals and measures completion and success rates through their bespoke insights platform. In September 2022 Mentem won Best in Class at the Australian Good Design awards for the work with Department of regional NSW government, creating a learning program to uplift staff in digital literacy.

In May 2022, UNSW announced the university had received a $4.7 million in funding in order to pursue health prevention research. The funding aims to fund research on infectious diseases, drug and alcohol use and primary health care. Announced as part of NSW Health's Prevention Research Support Program (PRSP), the research is designed to support NWS research organisations conducting prevention and early intervention research.

== Campuses and buildings ==
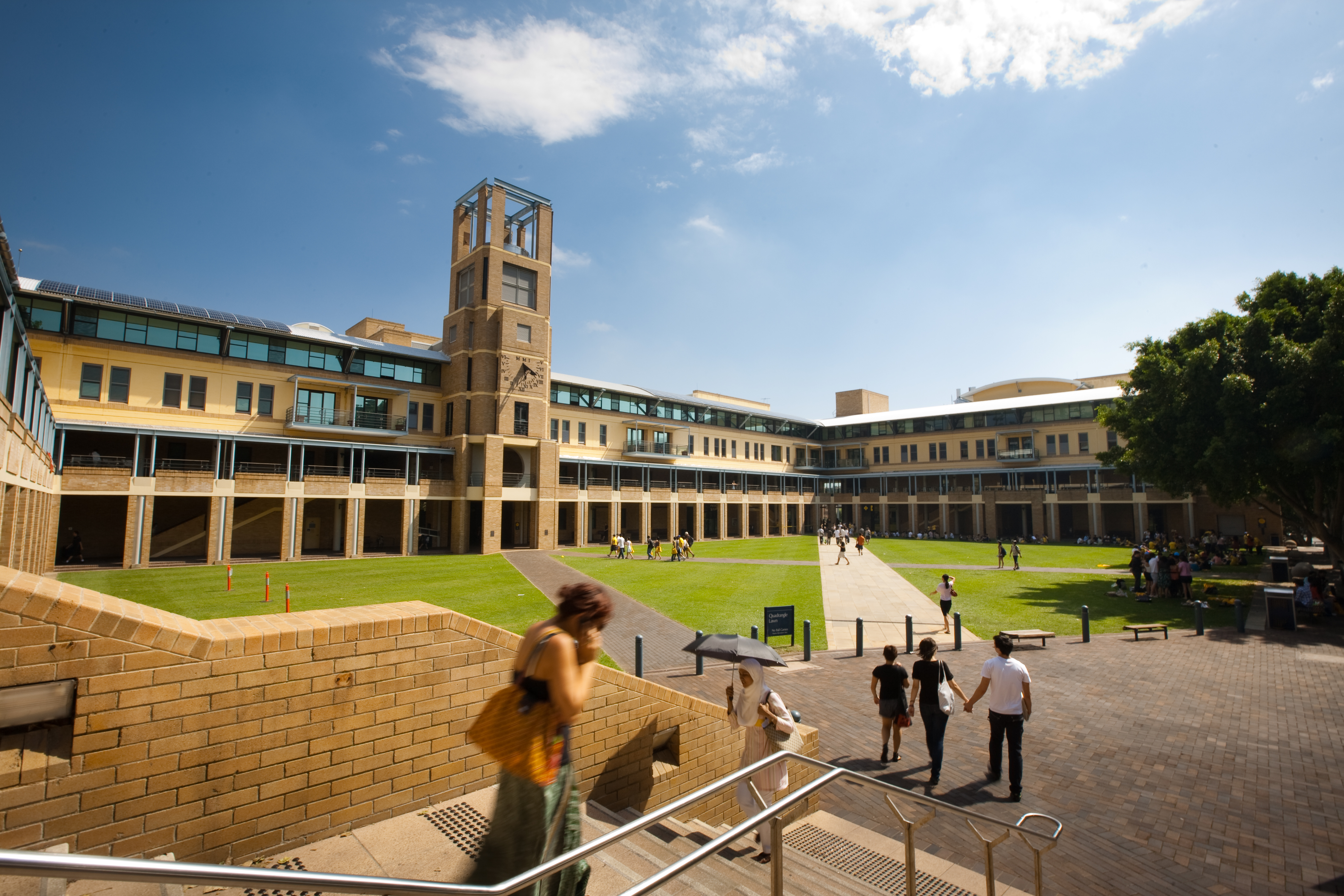
Quadrangle Building

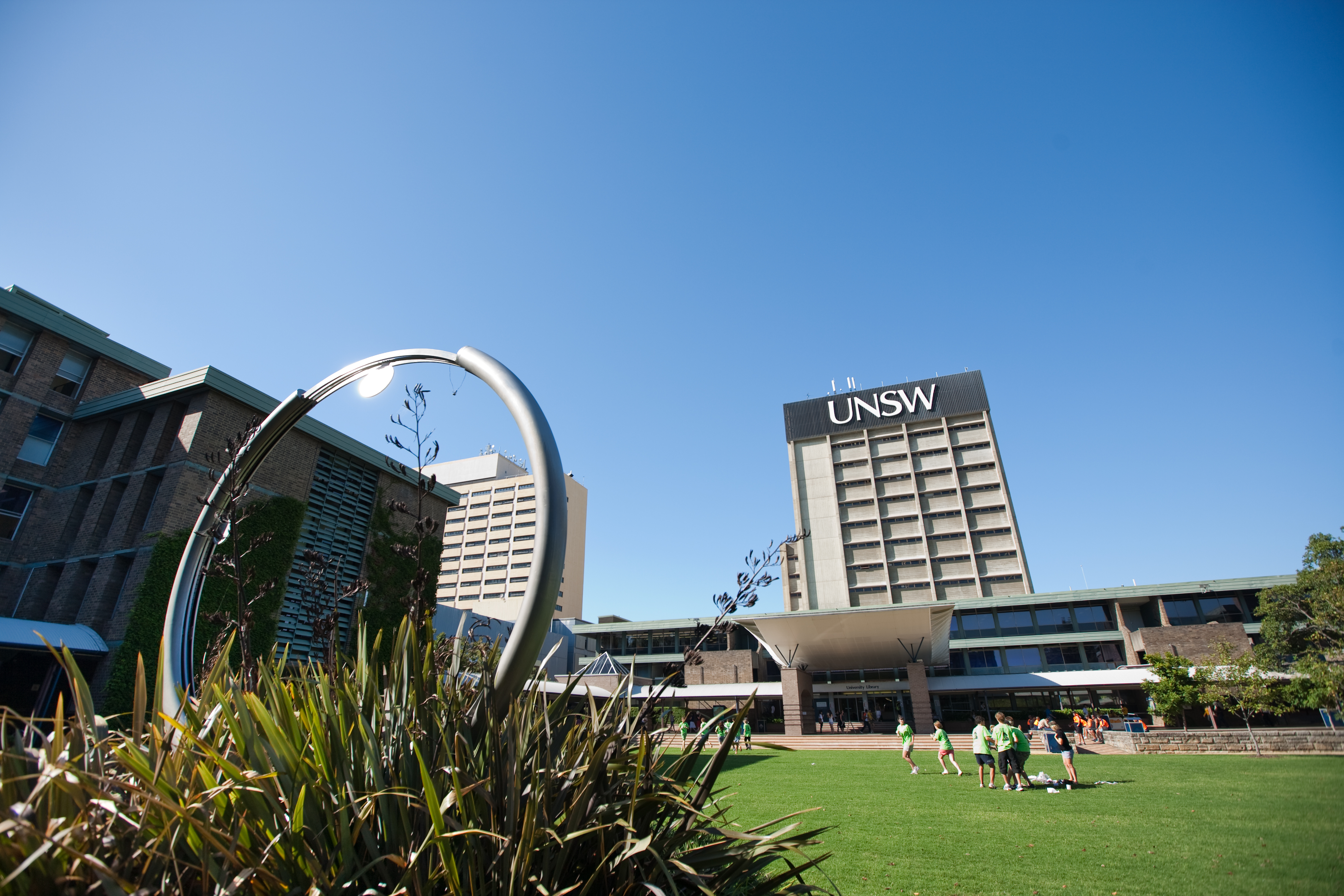
Library Lawn, upper campus

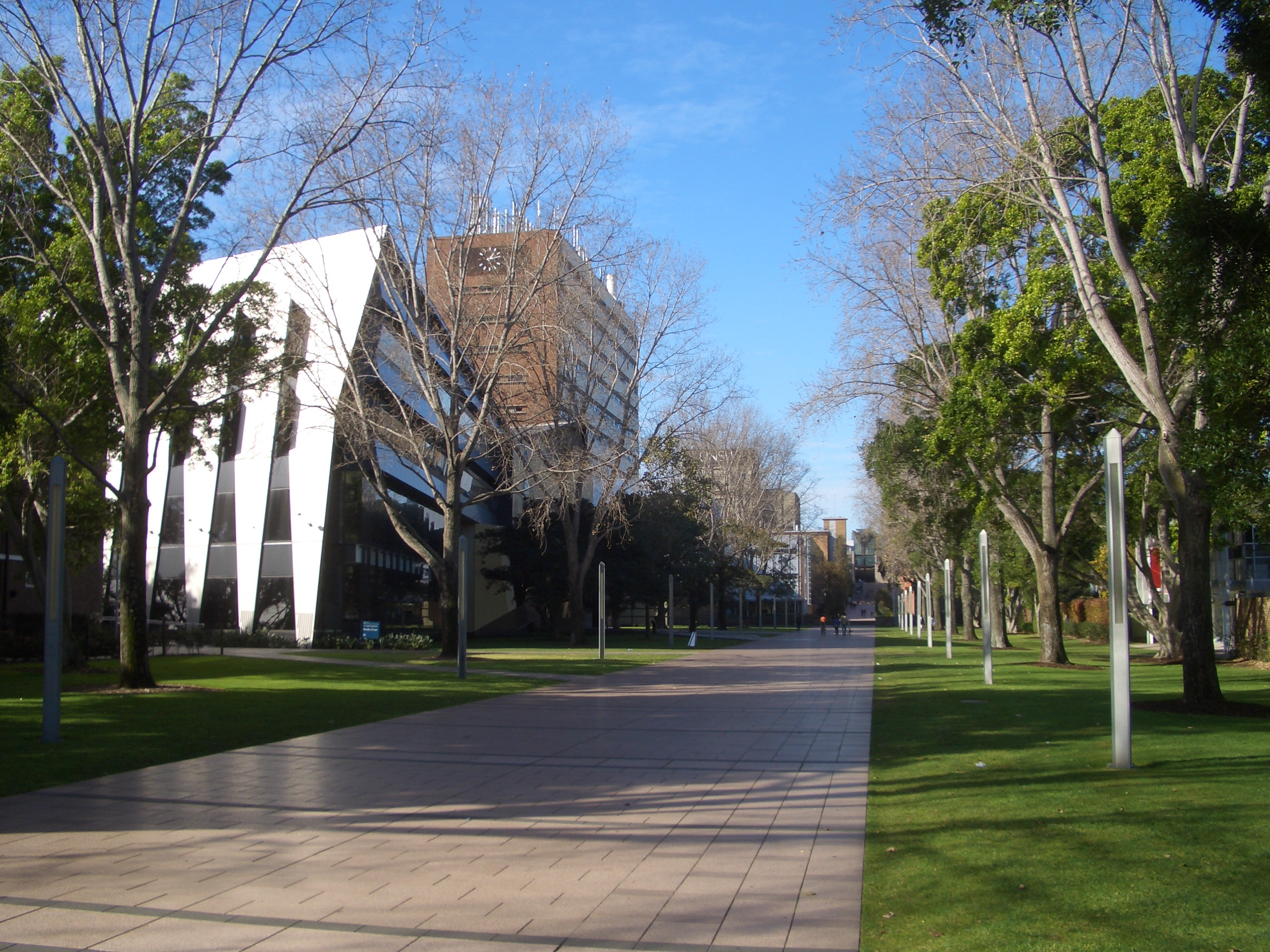
Main Walkway, lower campus

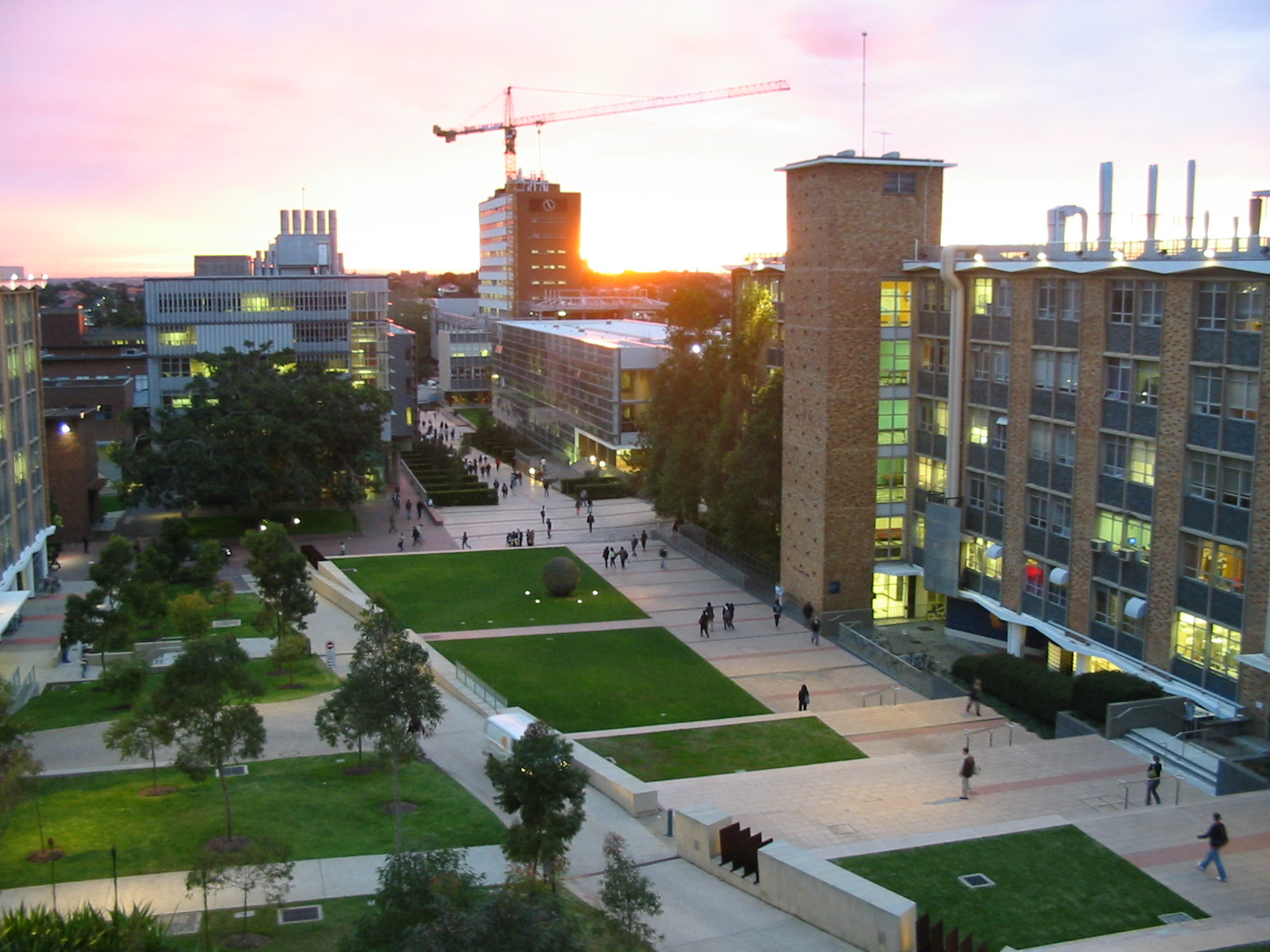
Lower campus

The main UNSW campus, where most faculties are situated, is located on a 38-hectare (94-acre) site in Kensington, Sydney. UNSW Art & Design is located in the inner suburb of Paddington. The university also has additional campuses and field stations in Randwick, Coogee, Botany, Dee Why, Cowan, Manly Vale, Fowlers Gap, Port Macquarie, Wagga Wagga, Albury, Coffs Harbour, Griffith, and Bankstown Airport.

=== Main Campus ===
The main UNSW campus in Kensington is divided geographically into two areas: upper campus and lower campus, which were vested to the university in three separate lots. These two are separated mainly by an elevation rise between the quadrangle and the Scientia building. Roughly 15 minutes are needed to walk from one end to the other.

=== Art & Design Campus ===
The UNSW School of Art & Design campus is located in Paddington, Sydney and offers undergraduate and Honours degrees in Visual Arts, Design, Animation & Moving Image, and Art Theory; and postgraduate and research degrees in Fine Arts, Design, Curating & Cultural Leadership, Animation & Visual Effects, and Simulation & Immersive Technologies.

=== Sydney CBD Campus ===
UNSW has set up a new CBD campus in 2025, located at Level 4 Poly Centre, 210 George Street, Sydney spanning 1,622 square metres (17,460 sq ft) across 2 levels, currently operating as a pilot. During the pilot phase, students and staff have access to areas supporting flexible, collaborative learning.

=== Randwick Campus ===
The Randwick campus is located at 22-32 King Street, Randwick, New South Wales. It also houses the UNSW Medicine's National Drug and Alcohol Research Centre.

=== Manly Vale Northern Beaches Campus ===
The Manly Value campus is located at 110 King St, Manly Vale, New South Wales in the Northern Beaches and hosts the School of Civil and Environmental Engineering's Water Research Laboratory.

=== Canberra Campus ===
UNSW Canberra at ADFA (formerly known as UNSW at ADFA), abbreviated to UNSW Canberra, is situated in Canberra. Its students are from the military academy known as ADFA, who are in training for the Australian Defence Force, and as such has an integrated defence focus, with particular strengths in defence-related, security and engineering research.

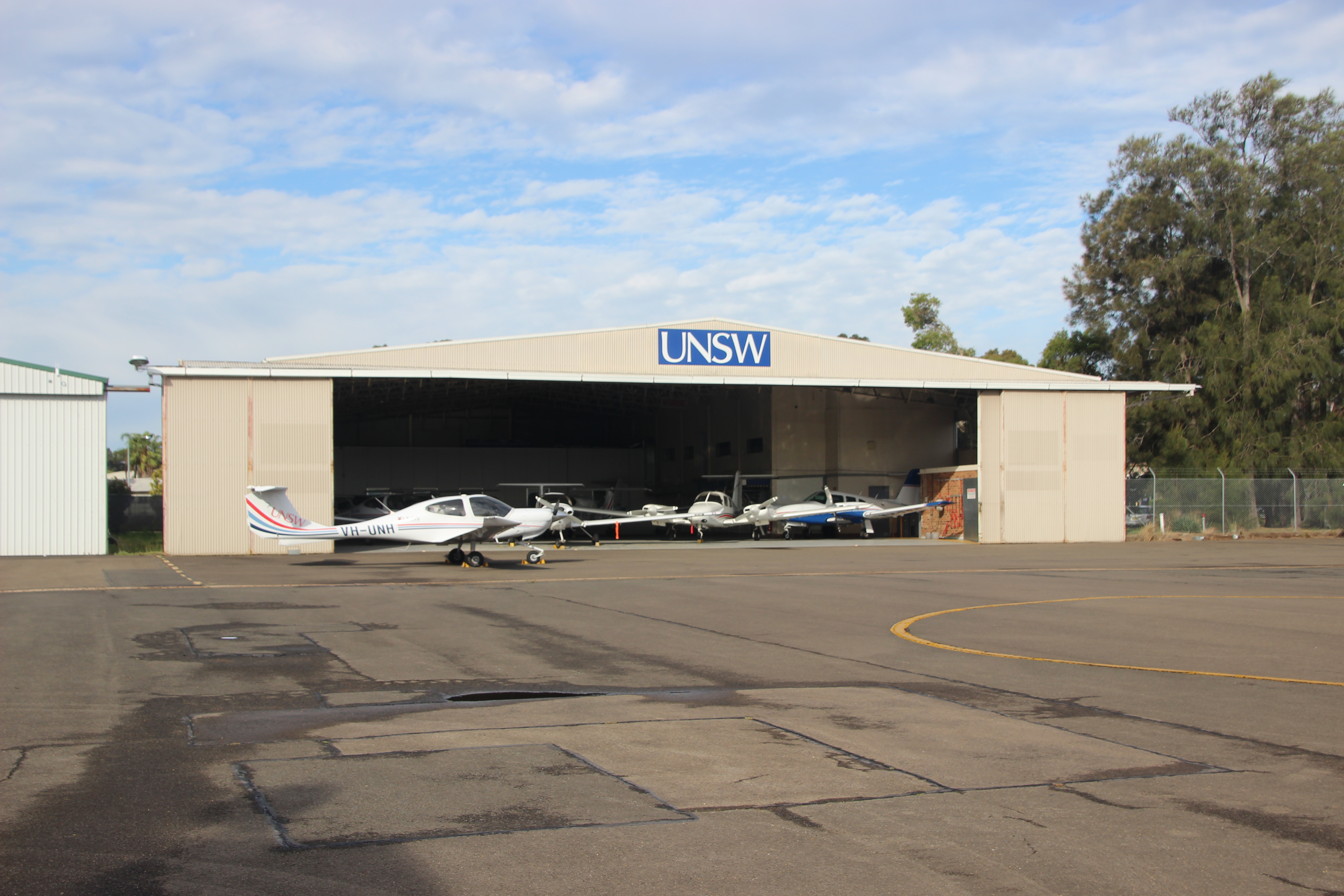
UNSW Flying Operations Unit is based at Bankstown Airport

=== Venues and other facilities ===
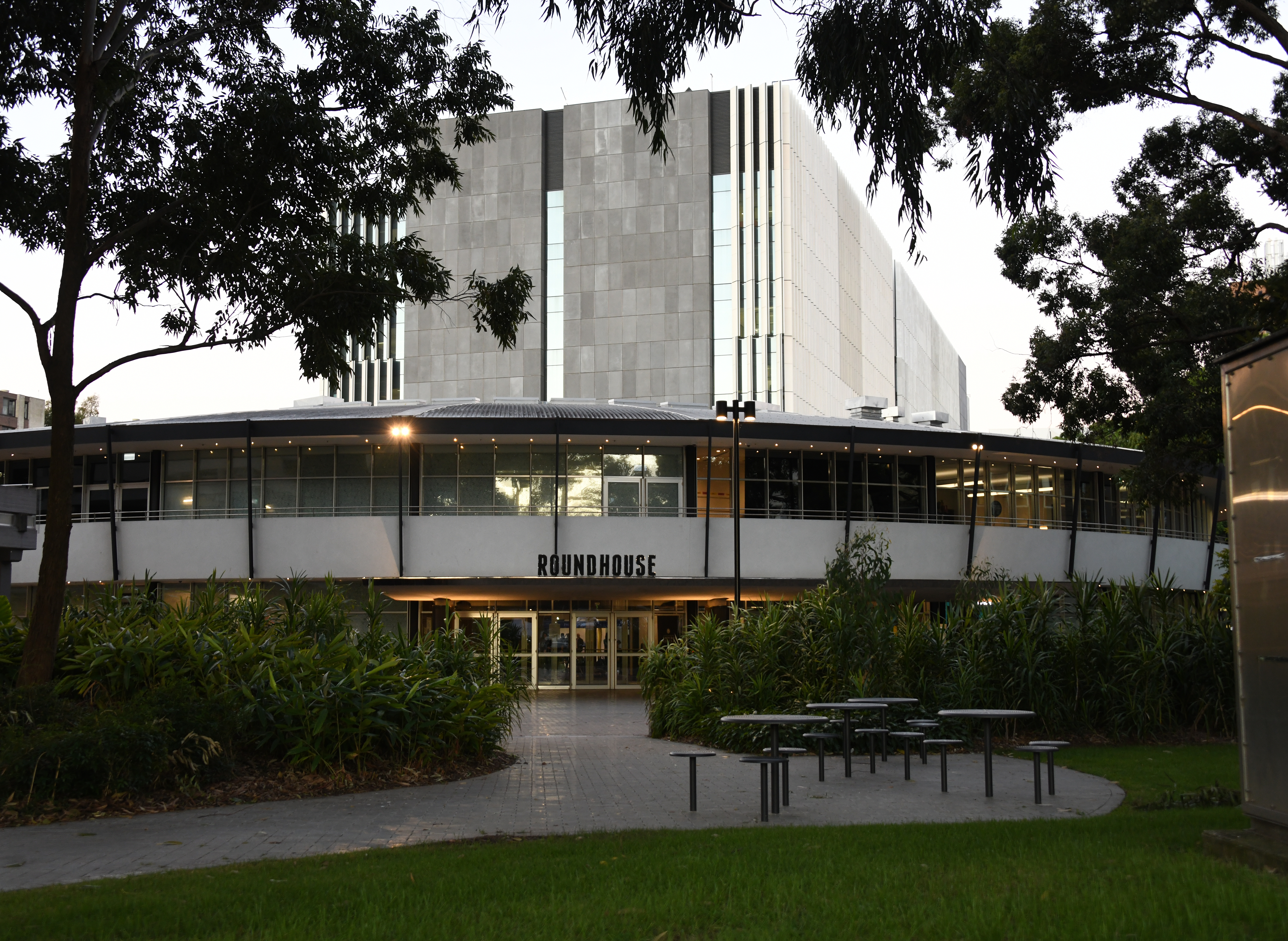
The Roundhouse, constructed in 1961, is one of the venues for concerts, conferences, and seminars

A number of theatre and music venues are at the university, many of which are available for hire to the general public. The UNSW Fitness and Aquatic Centre provides health and fitness facilities and services to both students and the general public.

== Governance and structure ==
=== University Council ===
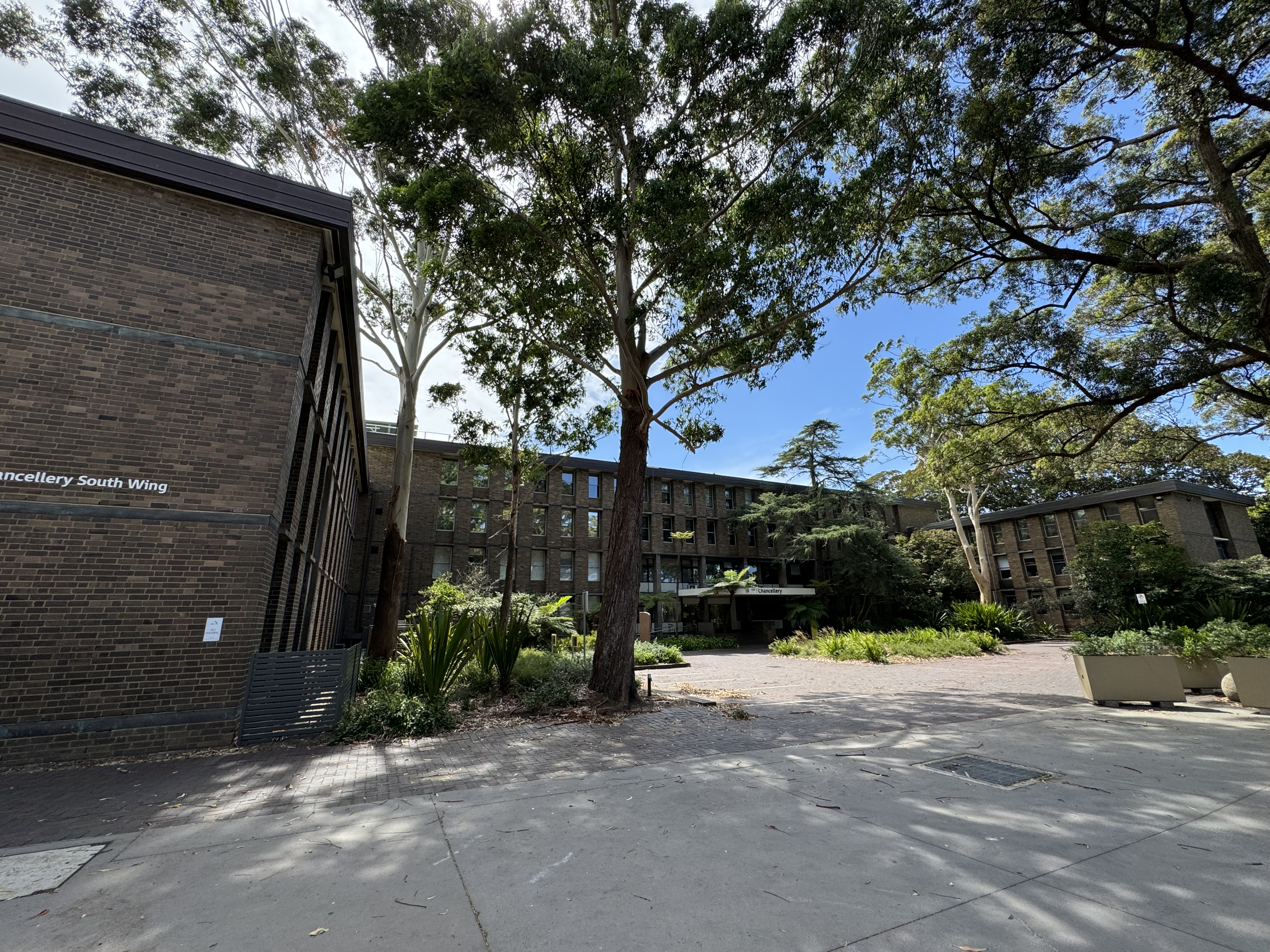
The Chancellery

The university is governed by the university council, which is responsible for acting on the university's behalf to promote its objectives and interests. The council has 15 members, including the chancellor, vice-chancellor, president of the academic board, two members appointed by the minister for education, five members appointed by the council, three members elected by university staff and two student-elected members.

The principal academic body is the Academic Board, which receives advice on academic matters from the faculties, college (Australian Defence Force Academy), and the boards of studies. It is responsible for academic policy setting, academic strategy via its eight standing committees, approval and delivery of programs, and academic standards. The board has 63 members, including the Vice-Chancellor, members of the executive team, deans and faculty presiding members, members elected from the academic staff, and six from the student body. The board advises the vice-chancellor and council on matters relating to teaching, scholarship and research and takes decisions on delegation from the council.

==== Chancellor and Vice-Chancellor ====
The chief executive officer of the university is the president and vice-chancellor, currently Attila Brungs. The deputy vice-chancellors and pro-vice-chancellors form part of an executive team that are responsible for academic operations, research policy, research management, quality assurance and external relations, including philanthropy and advancement.

Each of the faculties has its respective board, which are responsible for the teaching and examining of subjects within their scope.

=== Faculties and departments ===
As of 2025 the university has six faculties:

- Arts, Design & Architecture (includes six schools and six research centres)
  - Schools: Art & Design; Arts & Media; Built Environment; Education; Humanities & Languages; and Social Sciences
- Business (UNSW Business School)
- Engineering
- Law and Justice
- Medicine & Health
- Science
- UNSW Canberra, which includes the new (since late 2024) UNSW Canberra City campus as well as the long-established UNSW at ADFA campus (since 1967, as official education provider for Australian Defence Force)

The university also has an association with the National Institute of Dramatic Art.

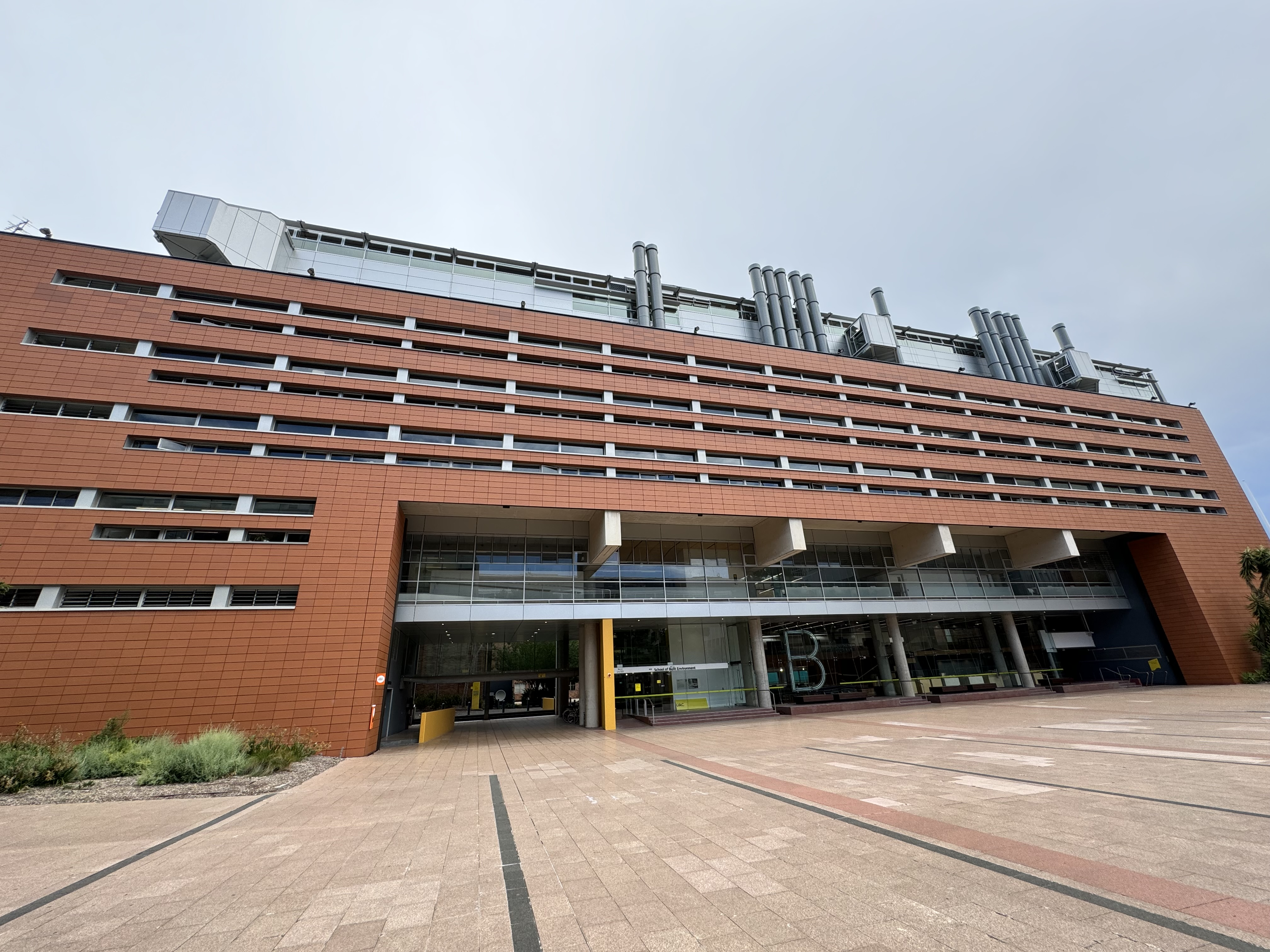
Anita B. Lawrence Centre, housing Built Environment

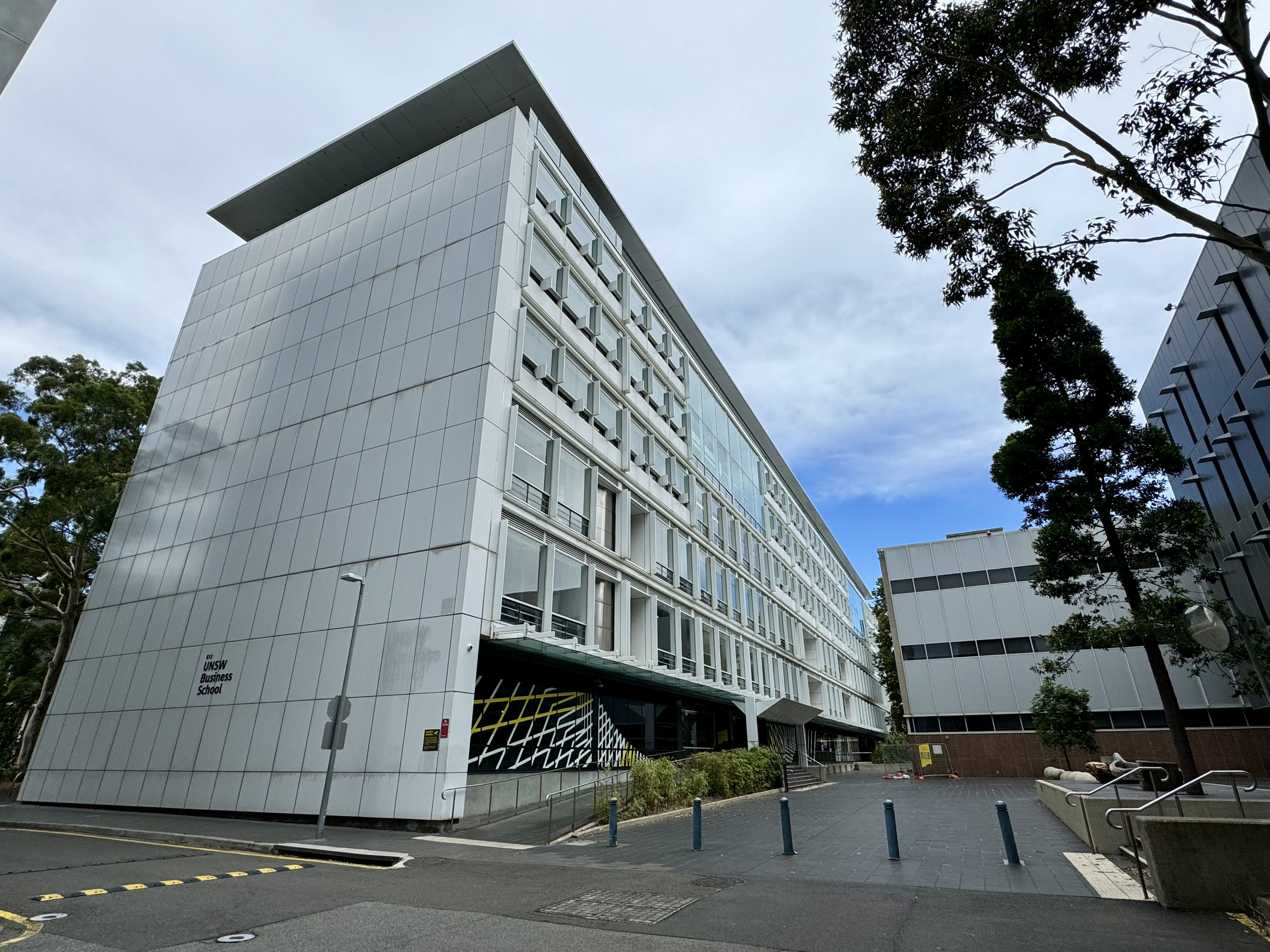
UNSW Business School

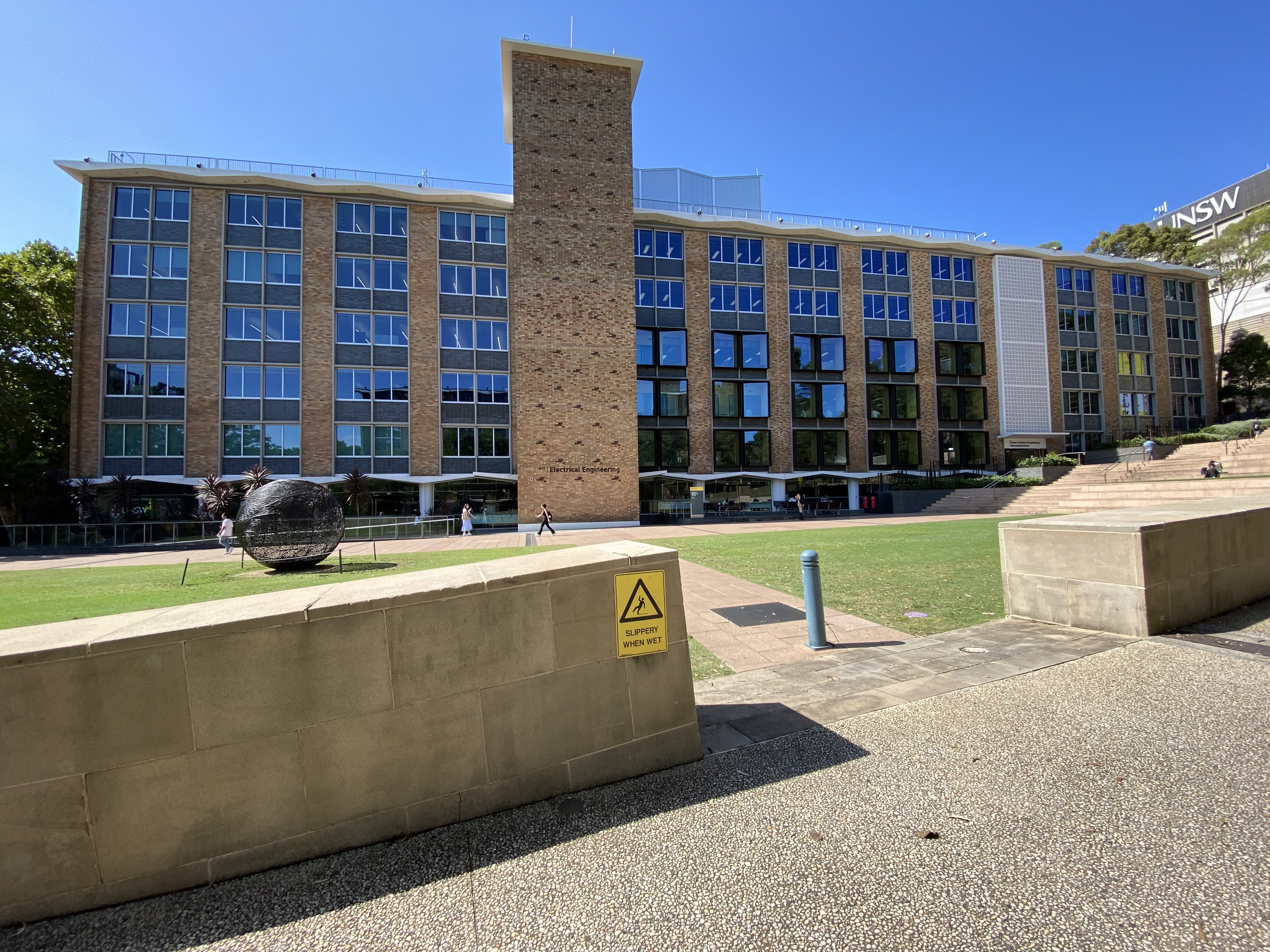
Electrical Engineering Building

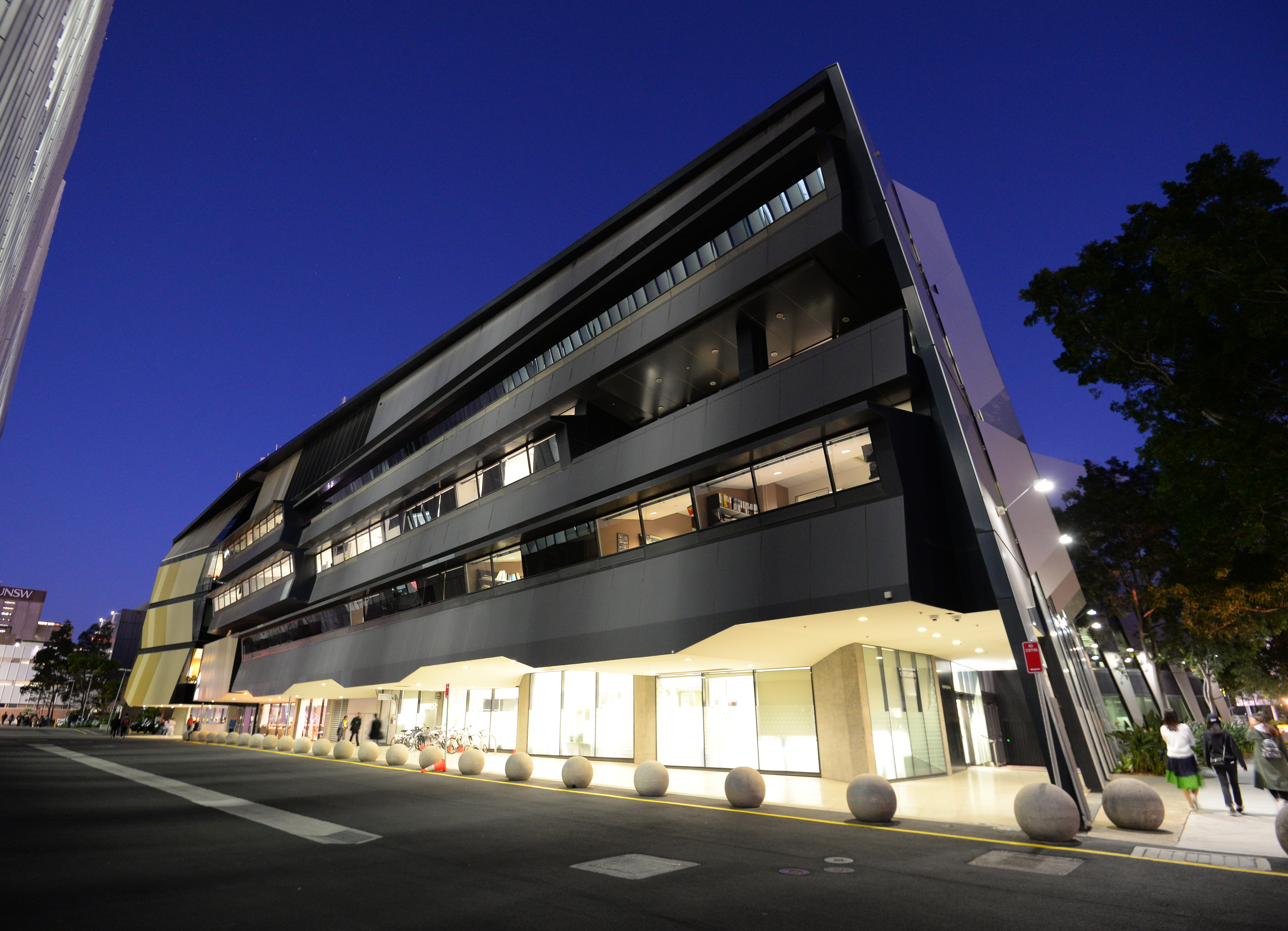
Law Building

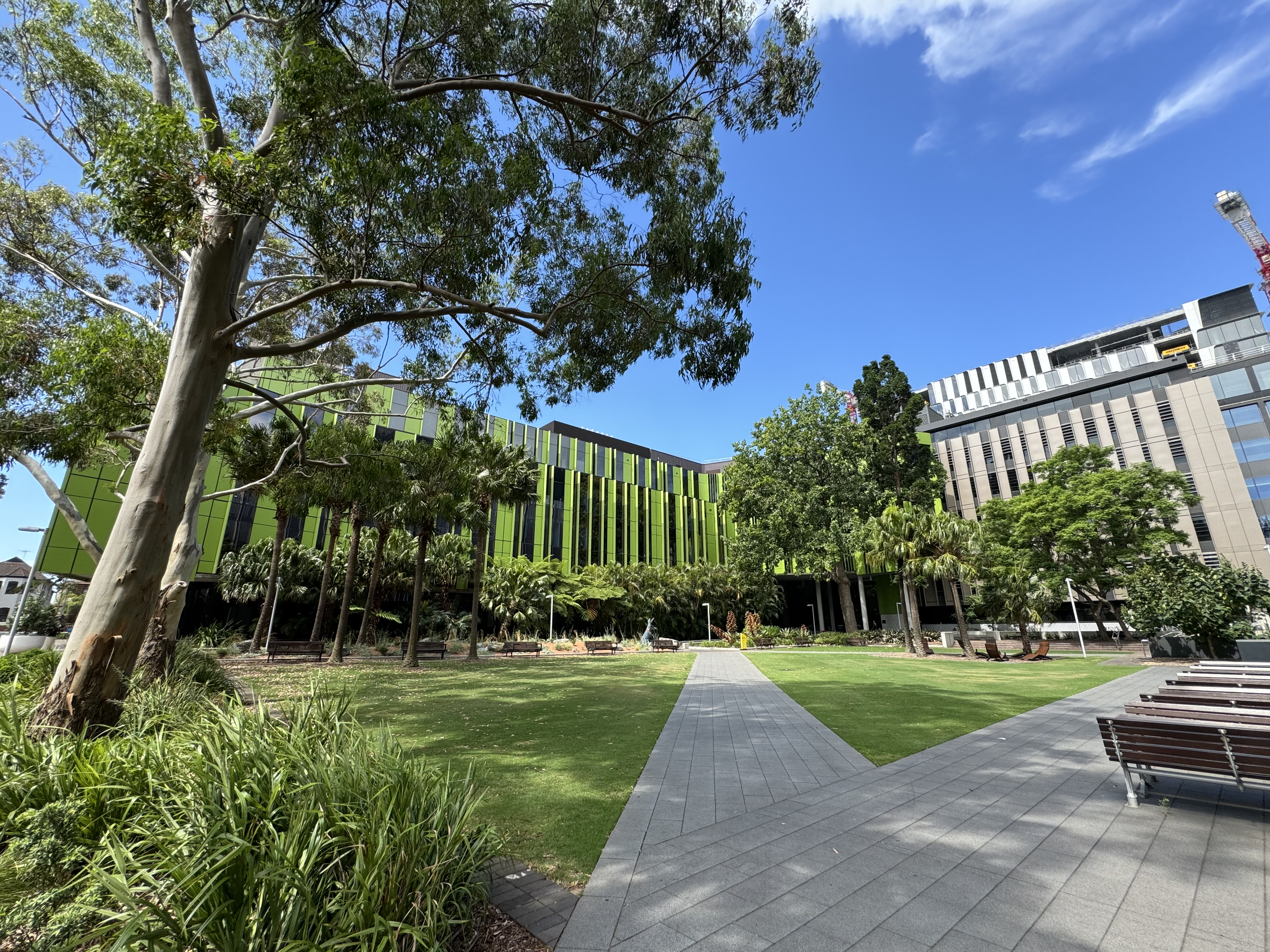
Wallace Wurth Building, housing Medicine & Health

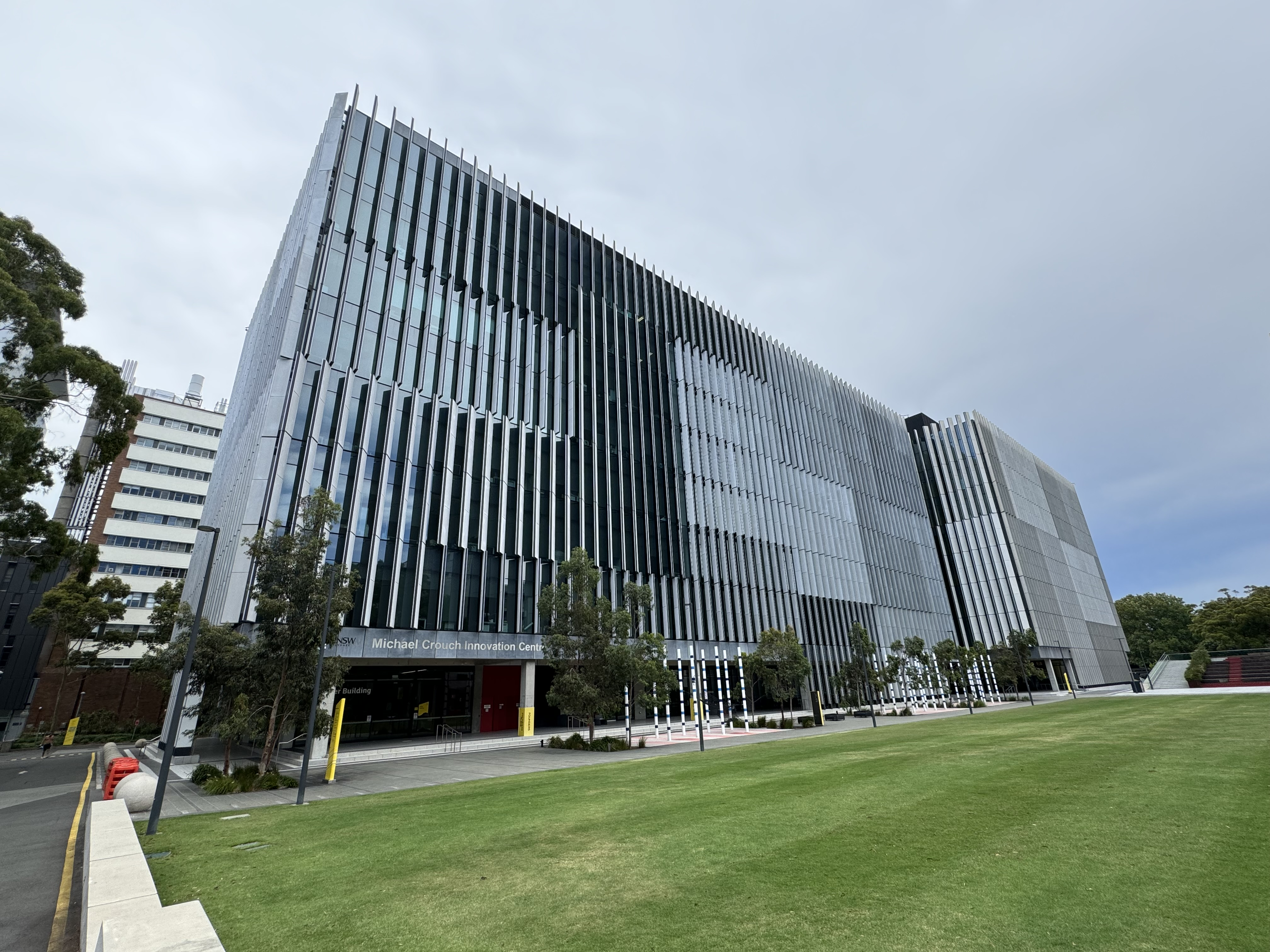
Hilmer Building and Science & Engineering Building

=== Insignia ===
==== Coat of arms ====
The grant of arms was made by the College of Arms on 3 March 1952. The grant reads:

Argent on a Cross Gules a Lion passant guardant between four Mullets of eight points Or a Chief Sable charged with an open Book proper thereon the word "SCIENTIA" in letters also sable.

The lion and the four stars of the Southern Cross on the St George's Cross have reference to the State of New South Wales which established the university; the open book with scientia ("knowledge") across its pages is a reminder of its purpose. The placement of scientia on the book was inspired by its appearance on the arms of Imperial College London, formed in 1907. Beneath the shield are the Latin words within a scroll: "Corde Manu et Mente" ("heart, hand and mind"), which when combined with scientia forms the Latin motto of the university: Scientia Corde Manu et Mente or 'Knowledge by heart, hand and mind'.

The original motto of the university, from 1952 was Scientia Manu et Mente ("Knowledge by hand and mind"), which used the earlier motto of the Sydney Technical College (Manu et Mente or 'by hand and mind') from which the university developed. In 2021, the motto was changed, with approval from the College of Arms, to its current form to reflect the university's brand concept of 'collective difference'. Following the rules of English heraldry, the motto does not form part of the arms and consequently the alteration did not formally require approval of the College of Arms.

An update of the design and colours of the arms was undertaken in 1970, which provided a more contemporary design, yet retained all the arms' heraldic associations. In 1994, the university title was added to the arms, as was the abbreviation "UNSW", to create the UNSW symbol that is used for everyday and marketing purposes.

==== Market Branding ====
While its name remains unchanged, in late 2013, the university adopted the business name "UNSW Australia" for branding and marketing. On 24 June 2016 the university registered and the business name "UNSW Sydney" which it adopted in January 2017 for branding and marketing of its Sydney campus and similarly registered and adopted the business name "UNSW Canberra" for its Australian Defence Force Academy campus in Campbell, ACT.

==== Mace ====
The ceremonial mace of the university is made of stainless steel with silver facings and a shaft of eumung timber. On the head are mounted four silver shields, two engraved with the arms of the State of New South Wales and two with the original-design arms of the university. A silver Waratah, NSW's floral emblem, surmounts the head. The mace was donated to the university by BHP and was presented by the company's chairman, Colin Syme, on 6 December 1962. A former NSW Government Architect, Cobden Parkes, was appointed as the first official mace-bearer.

== Academic profile ==
=== Research divisions ===
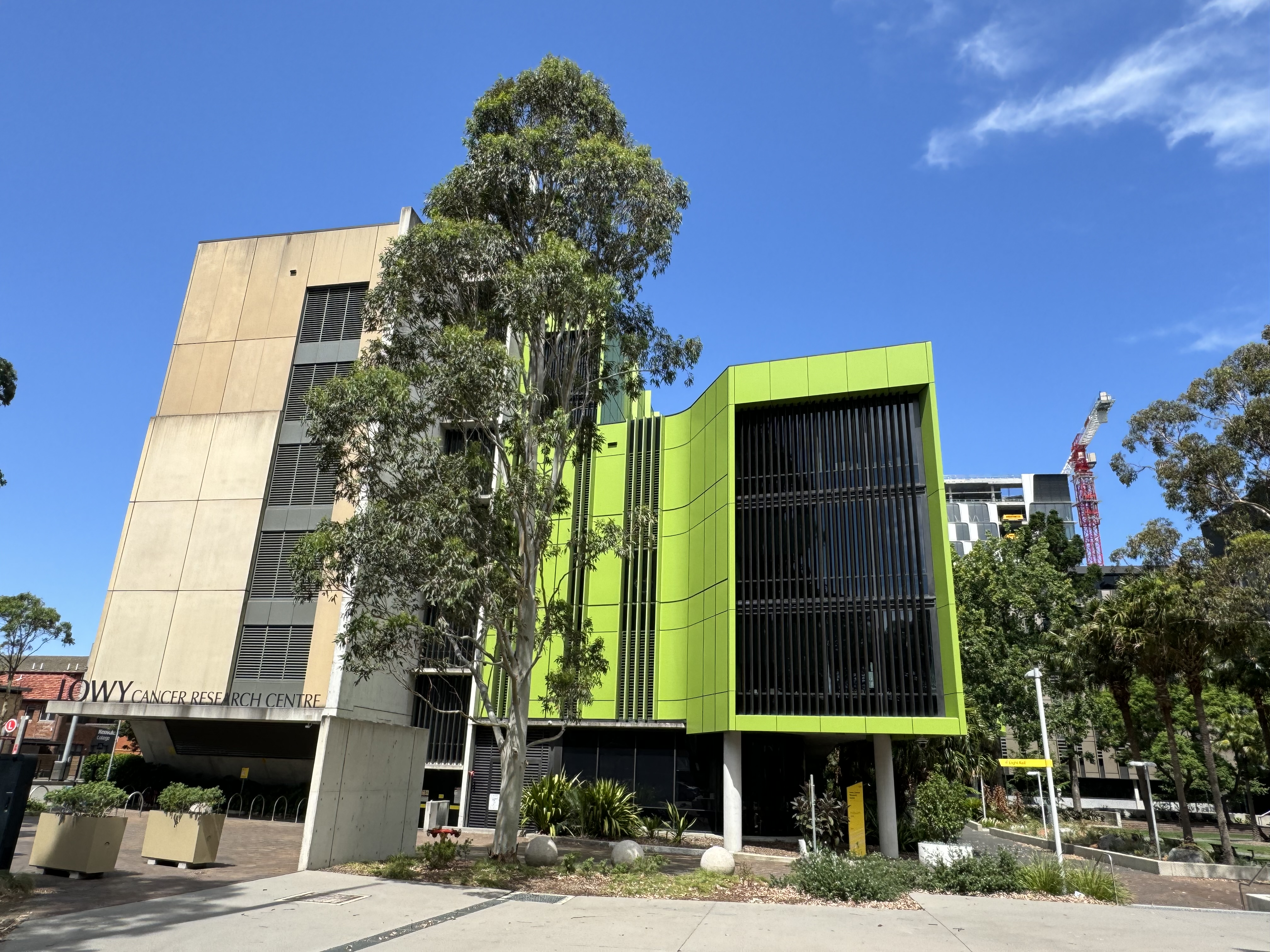
Lowy Cancer Research Centre

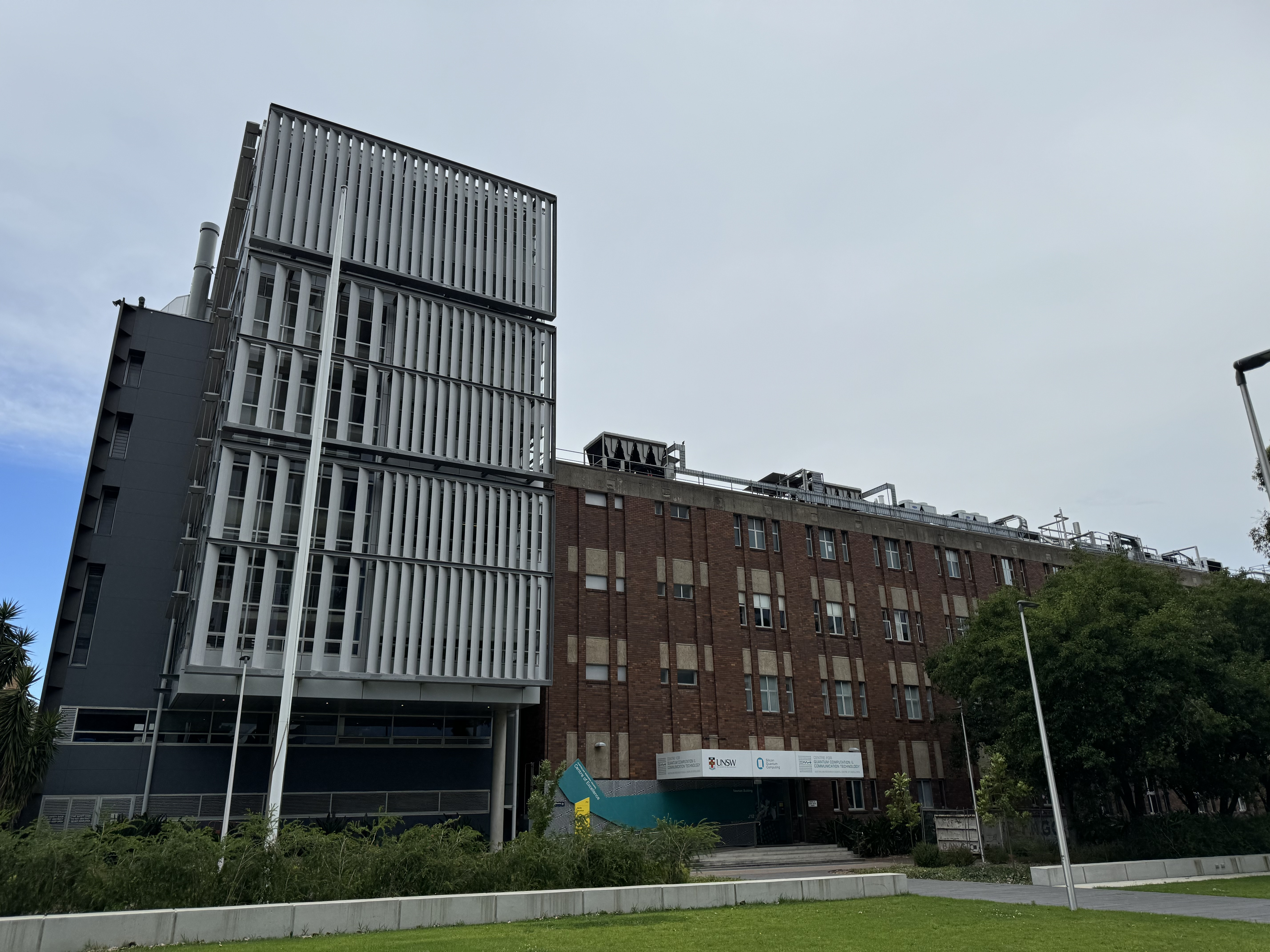
The Australian Research Council Centre of Excellence in Quantum Computation and Communication Technology (CQC2T) is located in the Newton Building

The university has a number of purpose-built research facilities, including:

- UNSW Lowy Cancer Research Centre is Australia's first facility bringing together researchers in childhood and adult cancers, as well as one of the country's largest cancer-research facilities, housing up to 400 researchers.
- The Mark Wainwright Analytical Centre is a centre for the faculties of science, medicine, and engineering. It is used to study the structure and composition of biological, chemical, and physical materials.
- UNSW Canberra Cyber is a cyber-security research and teaching centre.
- The Sino-Australian Research Centre for Coastal Management (SARCCM) has a multidisciplinary focus, working collaboratively with the Ocean University of China in coastal management research.

=== Academic reputation ===
University rankings

Global – Overall
- ARWU World: 77 (2025)
- CWTS World: 38 (Note: The CWTS Leiden Ranking is based on P (top 10%).) (2024)
- QS World: 19 (2027)
- THE World: 75 (2027)
- USNWR Global: 33 (26/27)

National – Overall
- ARWU National: 4 (2025)
- CWTS National: 2 (2024)
- QS National: 1 (2027)
- THE National: 5 (2027)
- USNWR National: 3 (26/27)
- AFR National: 1 (2026)

Global publications

In the 2027 Quacquarelli Symonds World University Rankings (published 2026), the university attained a position of #19 (1st nationally).

In the 2026–2027 U.S. News & World Report Best Global Universities, the university attained a position of #33 (3rd nationally).

In the Times Higher Education World University Rankings 2027 (published 2026), the university attained a position of #75 (5th nationally).

In the 2025 Academic Ranking of World Universities, the university attained a position of #77 (4th nationally).

In the CWTS Leiden Ranking 2024, the university attained a position of #38 (2nd nationally).

National publications

In the Australian Financial Review Best Universities Ranking 2026, the university placed 1st place and best university in Australia.

=== Student outcomes ===
The Australian Government's QILT (Note: Abbreviation for Quality Indicators for Learning and Teaching.) conducts national surveys documenting the student life cycle from enrolment through to employment. These surveys place more emphasis on criteria such as student experience, graduate outcomes and employer satisfaction than perceived reputation, research output and citation counts.

In the 2023 Employer Satisfaction Survey, graduates of the university had an overall employer satisfaction rate of 85.5%.

In the 2023 Graduate Outcomes Survey, graduates of the university had a full-time employment rate of 81.3% for undergraduates and 91.7% for postgraduates. The initial full-time salary was A$75,000 for undergraduates and A$120,000 for postgraduates.

In the 2023 Student Experience Survey, undergraduates at the university rated the quality of their entire educational experience at 71.7% meanwhile postgraduates rated their overall education experience at 78%.

=== Engagement with schools ===
UNSW engages with primary and secondary education, administering several national and international academic competitions for school age children. These include:

- The Australian Schools Science Competition – International Competitions and Assessments for Schools (ICAS) is conducted by Educational Assessment Australia, UNSW Global Pty Limited.
- International Competitions and Assessments for Schools-Mathematics – International Competitions and Assessments for Schools (ICAS). From 2003 to 2005, ICAS-Mathematics was called Australasian Schools Mathematics Assessment. Prior to 2003, it was known as the Primary Schools Mathematics Competition and was targeted at primary schools.
- The UNSW School Mathematics Competition – Since 1962, the School of Mathematics and Statistics has run the UNSW School Mathematics Competition. This competition is a three-hour open book Olympiad-style exam designed to assess mathematical insight and ingenuity rather than efficiency in tackling routine examples. Competition results are used as part of the assessment criteria for some university scholarships awarded by the UNSW School of Mathematics and Statistics.
- The UNSW COMPUTING ProgComp – Since 1997, The School of Computer Science and Engineering (UNSW COMPUTING) has run the UNSW COMPUTING ProgComp. This competition has the overall aim of raising awareness amongst high school students of the craft of programming and to encourage students to develop and apply their computing knowledge and skills.
- The UNSW COMPUTING Robotics Workshops – UNSW School of Computer Science and Engineering (UNSW COMPUTING) has developed specialised robotic workshops for school students. They focus on the use of the Lego NXT technology combined with the popular RoboCup Junior competition for schools. UNSW COMPUTING is also a national and NSW state sponsor of RoboCup Junior.

==== Educational Assessment Australia ====
Educational Assessment Australia (EAA) is a not-for-profit organisation previously owned by the University of New South Wales. It was acquired by Janison Education Group on 31 May 2020. It is a national and international educational assessment organisation specialising in large-scale assessment programs including the International Competitions and Assessments for Schools (ICAS) in Australia, New Zealand, Asia, India, South Africa and the Pacific region. EAA also provides scanning, data analysis and reporting services to commercial and educational institutions.

=== Admissions ===
Entry to a particular undergraduate degree program for domestic students generally requires a certain Australian Tertiary Admission Rank, which varies by course. Some programs also take into account, in addition to a particular ATAR mark, performance in specialised tests, such as the Undergraduate Medicine and Health Sciences Admission Test for medicine and the Law Admission Test for law.

Undergraduate Admissions
Year	Enrolment Type			Total
2024	Domestic	9,385	62.20%	15,089
2024	Overseas	5,704	37.80%	15,089
2023	Domestic	8,694	67.91%	12,803
2023	Overseas	4,109	32.09%	12,803
2022	Domestic	8,326	73.25%	11,367
2022	Overseas	3,041	26.75%	11,367
2021	Domestic	9,049	75.59%	11,971
2021	Overseas	2,922	24.41%	11,971
2020	Domestic	7,802	75.34%	10,356
2020	Overseas	2,554	24.66%	10,356

In 2017, UNSW enrolled the highest number of Australia's top 500 high school students academically.

In 2019, UNSW had the most first preferences for high school students in the state of New South Wales.

The university offers a bonus points scheme, "HSC Plus", which awards up to a maximum of five points for performance in year 12 Australian Senior Secondary Certificate courses relevant to UNSW undergraduate degrees. The scheme does not apply to actuarial studies, law, medicine or psychology.

UNSW offers several scholarships and support programs to high achieving students. The Co-op program is a scholarship and industry engagement program awarded to students across many programs in the built environment, engineering, science and the Australian School of Business. Students usually enter the program after an application and interview while in their final year of high school. The university also offers Scientia Scholarships to a number of commencing students who performed exceptionally in the Higher School Certificate, which provide funding of $10,000 per year for the duration of the student's program. This is different from the Scientia PhD scholarship, which awards PhD scholarship with a package of $50,000 per annum, comprising a tax-free living allowance of $40,000 per annum for four years and a support package of up to $10,000 per annum.

UNSW also offers a mature age entry scheme, the University Preparation Program for students aged 20 or older, that can provide the requirements for entry into UNSW or other universities.

== Student life ==
=== Student union ===
ARC Logo

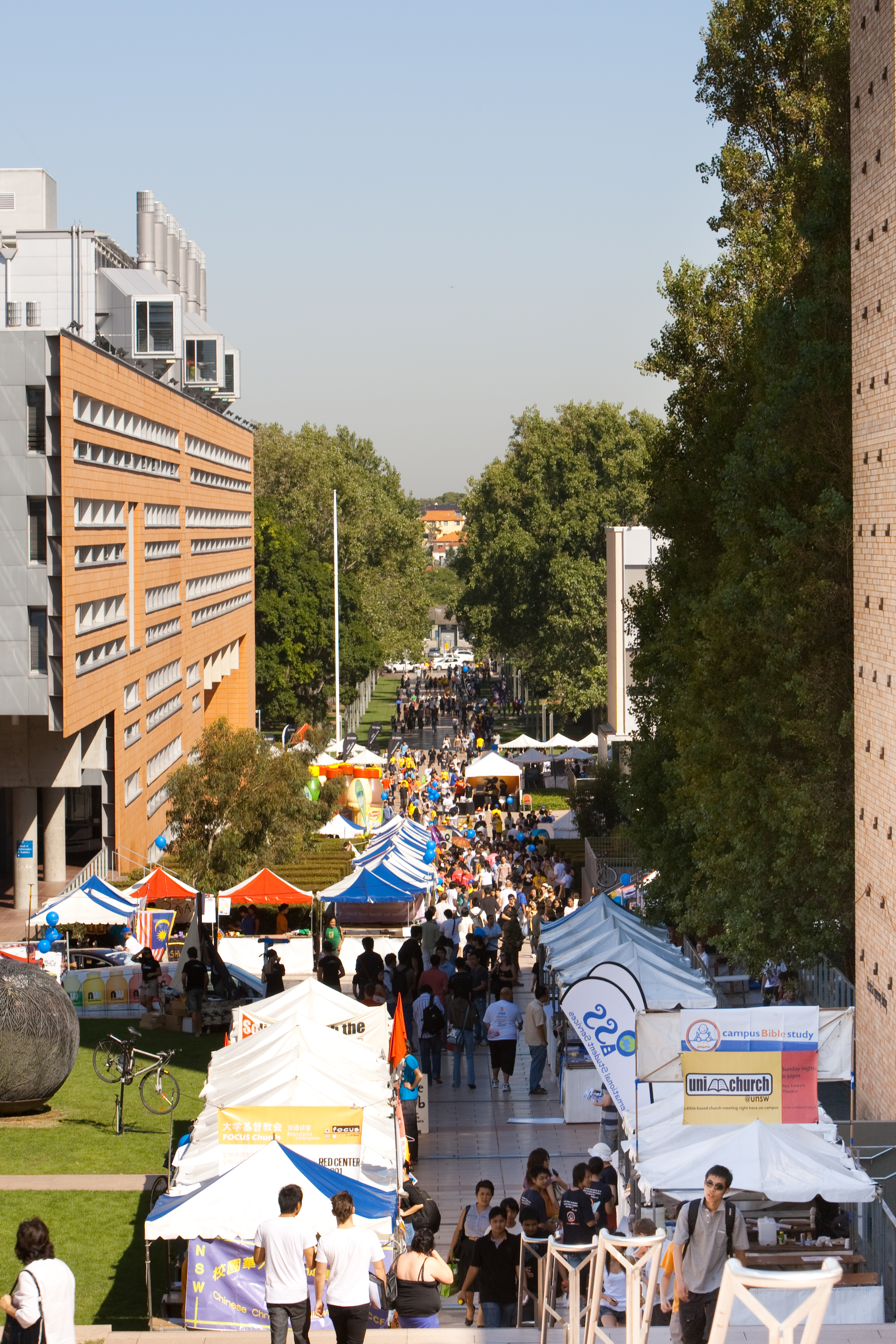
Orientation Week

Arc @ UNSW Limited is the student organisation at the University of New South Wales (UNSW) and is a not-for-profit public company.

In 2005, the Federal Parliament passed legislation making membership of student unions voluntary for the first time. This policy, known as voluntary student unionism (VSU), threatened the funding model behind the four UNSW student organisations with compulsory membership provisions. A report commissioned by the university administration recommended that three of those organisations – the Student Guild of Undergraduates and Postgraduates, the University of New South Wales Union and the College of Fine Arts Students' Association – merge into a single student organisation, a structure in use at the University of Melbourne. Arc was established on 15 August 2006 and launched early the following year, taking over the functions of three existing student organisations, the UNSW Student Guild, UNSW Union, and COFA Students' Association.

The organisation supports the activities of student clubs, student volunteer programs such as orientation week, student publications, two student galleries (Kudos Gallery and AD Space), and houses an elected student representative council. Arc operates the Roundhouse entertainment venue, the Graduation & Gift Store on UNSW's main campus in Kensington, and until recently, The Whitehouse bar and café which shut down permanently on 23 April 2021. Arc also operates a student support service, providing legal and academic advocacy. Arc@UNSW exists independently from UNSW.

Arc has three constitutional student bodies:

1. the Student Development Committee (SDC) – supporting clubs, volunteer programs, courses and activities,
2. the Postgraduate Council (PGC) – representing the postgraduate community at UNSW and
3. an elected Student Representative Council (SRC)

The student organisation is a major service provider on campus, running a number of retail outlets, student media such as Tharunka and an entertainment venue, the Roundhouse. The Arc Student Representative Council represents students to the university and nationally and fights for their rights. Arc also provides support and funding to university clubs and societies and runs student volunteer programs such as Orientation Week.

In 2007, the University of New South Wales Sports Association and UNSW Lifestyle Centre merged to become UNSW Sport and Recreation then later absorbed into Arc @ UNSW to become Arc Sport. It runs the external sporting facilities and services and supports the 30 UNSW affiliated sporting clubs that compete both at home and abroad.

=== Student media ===
==== Blitz ====
Blitz is a student publication, published online by Arc @ UNSW, based at the University of New South Wales. Blitz under this name first appeared in session 2, 1988, but a similar "what's on" style publication had been issued by the then University Union since the early 1970s. Initially it consisted of a simple sheet or two of paper, but it evolved into a magazine style format in session two 1994 when a former editor from another student publication on campus, Tharunka, was hired to found a weekly "what's on" magazine. Blitz sometimes pays casual contributors for submitted articles and photographs, and employs a student online editor, a student designer, a student TV producer and a student radio producer.

Blitz typically covers the goings-on around campus and conducts interviews and publishes stories relating to current student activities. It widely publicises Arc services and activities on campus. Due to its non-partisan policy, it does not cover political issues, with the exception of voluntary student unionism. However, in 2004 an edition of Blitz was withdrawn by the student union because it contained a guide to rolling a joint. The editor Janet Duncan claimed there had been censorship of her editorial in the following issue. Arc @ UNSW announced that the organisation would continue to publish the magazine after the introduction of voluntary student unionism in 2007.

==== Gamamari ====
Tharunka, thought to mean "message stick" in an Aboriginal language, is a student newspaper originally published by the UNSW Students Union from 1953 until 1992, when that body was replaced by the University of New South Wales Student Guild. The Guild published Tharunka from 1993 until 2006 and the successor student organisation, Arc @ UNSW Limited, continued the publication of Tharunka from 2007. The publication changed its name in mid-2024 to Gamamari, meaning "talking for a purpose" in the Dharawal Language.

==== Noise@UNSW ====
Noise@UNSW is an independent student publication established in early 2024, following the shutdown of Tharunka, with the aim of fostering a more informed student body. Noise publishes articles weekly on their website and Instagram page, focusing on university news, student politics and activism, student journalism, and other issues that affect students, as well as running a twice-monthly podcast called Make Some Noise. Noise@UNSW also produces print editions distributed to students on campus featuring student writings and art.

Due to its independent nature, Noise@UNSW is run by an entirely volunteer editorial team and relies on donations. All current UNSW students are able to publish their works in Noise.

=== Student accommodation ===
The university has a number of residential accommodation options, including Philip Baxter College, Basser College, Goldstein College, Fig Tree Hall, Colombo House, UNSW Hall, International House, New College and New College Village, Warrane College; Shalom College, and Creston College, and UNSW Village.

=== Exchange programs ===
The university has overseas exchange programs with over 250 overseas partner institutions. These include Princeton University, McGill University, Penn State University, University of Pennsylvania (inc. Wharton), Duke University, Drexel University, Johns Hopkins University, Brown University, Columbia University (summer law students only), University of California Berkeley, University of California Santa Cruz (inc. Baskin), UCLA, University of Michigan (inc. Ross), New York University (inc. Stern), University of Virginia, Mississippi State University, Cornell University, University of Connecticut, Alfred University, University of Texas at Austin (inc. McCombs), Maastricht University, University of Padua, University College London (law students only), University of Nottingham, Imperial College London, London School of Economics and ETH Zurich.

=== Student projects ===
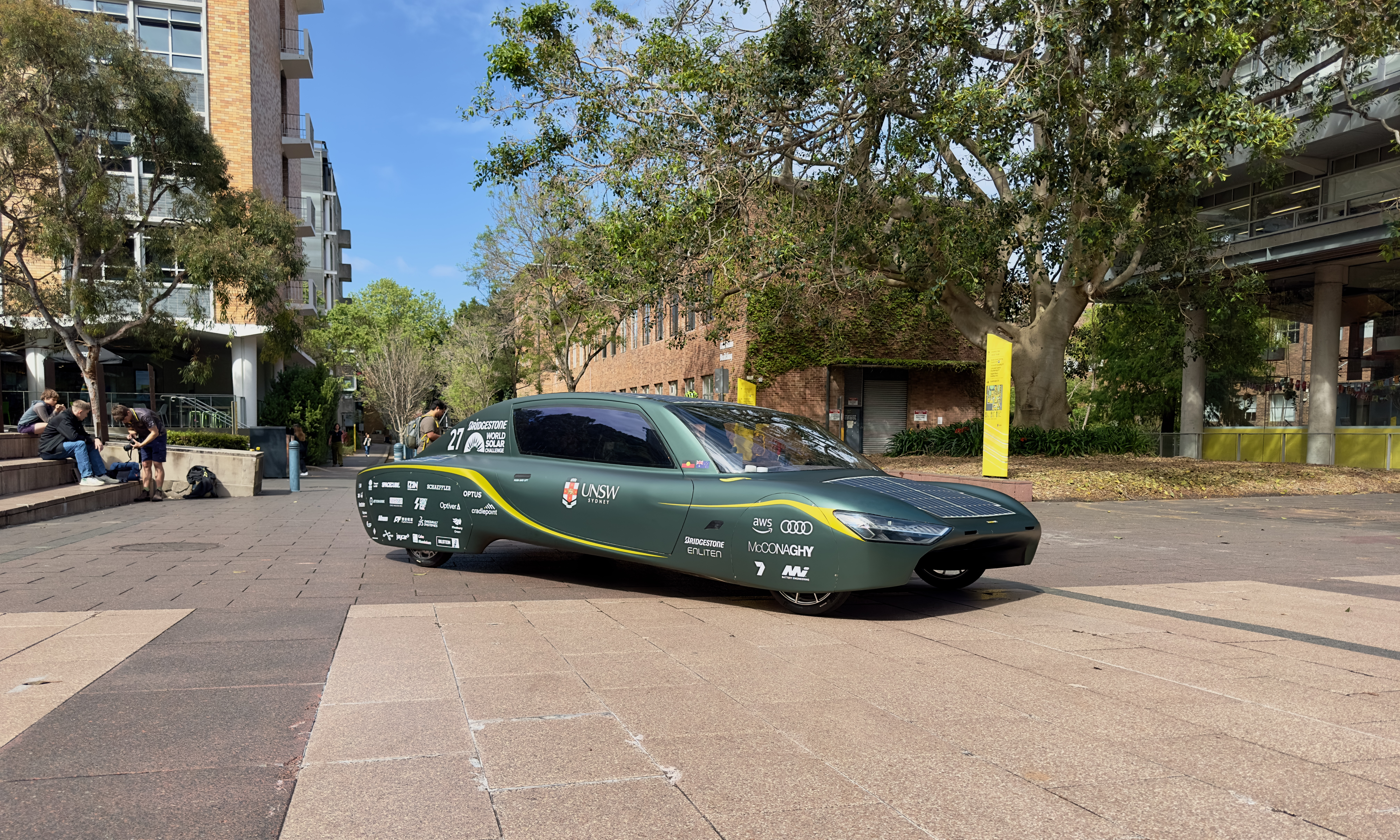
Sunswift 7, a student-built solar-powered car, won the 2023 World Solar Challenge Cruiser Class

Students of the university are involved in a number of projects, including:

- AtomCraft aims to deliver the first fusion tokamak entirely designed, built and operated by students. Started in 2024, aims to complete the first iteration of the device by 2027.
- Sunswift Solar Racing Team, who hold the FIA world record for the fastest electric car over a 500 kilometres (310 mi) distance and whose car Sunswift 7 won the 2023 Bridgestone World Solar Challenge Cruiser Class.
- rUNSWift, the university's team in the international RoboCup Standard Platform League competition, is the most successful team in the world with wins in 2000, 2001, 2003 and 2014 as well as coming second in 1999, 2002, 2006 and 2010.
- BLUEsat Satellite (development in progress)
- Impact Engineers are a group of cross disciplinary humanitarian engineers aspiring to make a difference to the world's developing communities. Impact Engineers currently focus their efforts in rural Sri Lanka however over the next three to five years, they will expand to launch projects across multiple developing countries
- UNSW Redback Racing UNSW's entrant into the SAE-Australasia Formula SAE-A Competition (National winners in 2000)
- The MAVSTAR (Micro Aerial Vehicles for Search, Tracking And Reconnaissance) project to develop a team of cooperative micro aerial and unmanned ground vehicles.
- The Developing Country Project Second year thesis students doing Photovoltaic and Renewable Energy Engineering are able to get involved. The project aims to assist villagers in developing countries to gain access to electricity to satisfy their energy needs in a clean and sustainable manner.
- iGEM (International Genetically Engineered Machine) a worldwide synthetic biology competition. BABS UNSW entered their first team in 2015.

== Athletics ==
The University has a soccer team, USNW FC.

== UNSW College ==
UNSW College, also known as UNSW Global "UNSW Global Pty Limited", is a not-for-profit provider of education, training and consulting services and a wholly owned enterprise of the University of New South Wales. It provides exams for students in Australia, New Zealand, Singapore, Brunei, Malaysia, South Africa, Indonesia, Hong Kong, India and the Pacific region. It caters to students from year 3 (Australia) through year 12, examining skills in English, mathematics, science, computers, writing and spelling. It is a wholly owned non-profit subsidiary of UNSW.

== Notable people ==
=== Notable alumni ===
Notable alumni include:

=== Politicians ===
- Scott Morrison, 30th Prime Minister of Australia
- Gladys Berejiklian, 45th Premier of New South Wales
- Bob Carr, former Minister of Foreign Affairs and 39th Premier of New South Wales
- Sussan Ley, former Leader of the Liberal Party
- Robert McClelland, former attorney-general of Australia
- Kerry Nettle, Australian Greens senator
- Campbell Newman, 38th Premier of Queensland
- Marise Payne, senator for New South Wales and Minister for Foreign Affairs
- Lucy Turnbull, former Lord Mayor of Sydney and wife of the 29th Prime Minister of Australia

=== Others ===
- Kathryn Campbell, disgraced former Australian public servant and a former senior officer in the Australian Army Reserve
- Solina Chau, billionaire businesswoman in Hong Kong
- Mark Bouris, CEO of Yellow Brick Road and television personality
- Mike Cannon-Brookes, CEO of software company Atlassian
- Roger Corbett, former chairman of the Reserve Bank of Australia
- Glyn Davis, vice-chancellor of the University of Melbourne
- John Deeble, architect of Medicare
- Kathryn Fagg AO (M.Com.), chair of the CSIRO from 2021
- Richard Ferrero, microbiologist
- Tim Flannery, mammalogist, palaeontologist, activist and author
- Peter Garrett, rock musician, former federal politician
- Shaun Gladwell, visual artist
- Rebel Wilson, actress, writer, director
- Karl Kruszelnicki, scientist and media presenter ("Dr Karl")
- Bob Bellear, first Indigenous judge
- Charlie Teo, neurosurgeon
- David James, former head of diabetes and obesity at the Garvan Institute of Medical Research
- Betty Kitchener, founder of mental health first aid
- King Tupou VI of Tonga
- Jacqueline McKenzie, prominent Australian film, stage and television actress
- Prince Mak, idol group member of Korean boyband JJCC
- Hamid Mirzadeh, Iranian politician and academic, third president of the Islamic Azad University
- Glenn Murcutt, architect
- Anne-Marie Schwirtlich, director-general of the National Library of Australia
- David Wong Dak Wah, chief judge of the High Court of Sabah and Sarawak
- King Vajiralongkorn of Thailand
- Mark Taylor, former captain of the Australian cricket team
- Mitchell Butel, actor and director
- Kerry Chant, medical doctor, NSW Chief Health Officer
- Pranav Mohanlal, Mollywood Actor.
- Shi Zhengrong, businessman and philanthropist former richest person in China.

UNSW has produced more millionaires than any other Australian university, according to the Spear's Wealth Management Survey in 2016.

Engineers Australia ranked UNSW as having the highest number of graduates in "Australia's Top 100 Influential Engineers 2013" list at 23%, followed by Monash University at 8%, the University of Western Australia, University of Sydney and the University of Queensland at 7%.

=== Celebrating UNSW Women ===
In 2022, the Women's Trail was launched. This involved the renaming of buildings and spaces across UNSW campuses after women UNSW women role models. Some of the women included are:

- Moya Dodd
- Catherine Harris

== Controversies ==
In 1975, the High Court of Australia delivered the decision in University of NSW v Moorhouse that UNSW authorised copyright infringement by providing coin operated photocopy machines, without taking proper measures to prevent an infringement. As a result, the Copyright Act 1968 was amended to state that libraries are not authorising copyright infringement if a notice is set out that displays relevant provision of the Act near the photocopy machine.

On 19 April 2000, postgraduate student Lin Chun was crushed on campus by an unmanned truck that rolled down a slope. She later died on campus as a result of her injuries. The university denied liability over the accident.

In 2007, UNSW opened a campus in Singapore following an invitation by Singapore's Economic Development Board to open a campus. However, one semester later, students and staff were sent home, and the campus was closed due to lack of enrolments, resulting in a loss of $15 million to the university.

In February 2007, UNSW publicly apologised after a police probe revealed that bodies donated to train surgeons were possibly fondled by a member of the staff, resulting in the sacking of one staff member and another staff member quitting.

In July 2009, a field trip organised by the School of Biological Earth and Environmental Sciences near Darling Harbour resulted in a research assistant losing control of an inflatable vessel while performing a turn causing three passengers who were not wearing lifejackets, to fall off, including one that suffered from a broken wrist and severe injuries to her leg. In 2013, the university was fined $100,000 after the WorkCover Authority of New South Wales launched legal action.

In 2012, PhD student Rui Zhang threw sulfuric acid at another student, before attacking him with a hammer inside a chemistry lab at the university. The judge later found Rui not guilty on grounds of mental illness.

In October 2015, UNSW issued a security warning after an anonymous threat was made on 4chan, stating "I finally managed to get a handgun. Australians, if you study at UNSW don't go in tomorrow", resulting in state and federal police swarming the campus the next morning.

In January 2018, the New South Wales Civil and Administrative Tribunal held that UNSW had violated the Privacy and Personal Information Protection Act 1998 after a student had their PhD candidature terminated by the university. As a result, the student made a Government Information request, asking for their student file and reasons for termination to make a formal complaint against 19 university staff members. However, upon processing the request, a staff member leaked the complaint to individuals who were on the listed in the complaint.

In 2018, a casual academic made a complaint to the Fair Work Ombudsman that UNSW did not keep records of all hours worked by employees. In 2021, UNSW began remediating underpayments to casual academic staff for the period between January 2014 to December 2020, setting aside more than $36 million to back-pay academics and had already paid $13.5 million by 2025. In 2023, the Fair Work Ombudsman launched legal action against UNSW in the Federal Circuit Court of Australia, alleging that UNSW had poor payroll practices and that UNSW "knew" that casual academics were being underpaid. In December 2025, UNSW was ordered to pay $213,210 in penalties.

In August 2020, after the Chinese government cracked down on liberties in Hong Kong, the UNSW posted a tweet promoting a call by Elaine Pearson (a human rights expert and adjunct law lecturer at the university) for the United Nations to take steps on human rights violations in Hong Kong. Chinese state-owned media, as well as some Chinese students, responded with anger, and UNSW then deleted the tweet. The deletion of the tweet was condemned by many Australian Federal MPs as a violation of free-speech principles. Chinese-Australian artist Badiucao also suggested that pro-democracy Chinese students were living in 'fear'. UNSW vice-chancellor Ian Jacobs issued an apology, saying that the decision to remove the tweet was a "mistake"; that the university was "does not take official political positions"; and that he "unequivocally" reaffirmed the university's "previous commitment to freedom of expression and academic freedom." The university came under fire for a Chinese-language message sent by UNSW Global's CEO, Laurie Pearcey, two days earlier. That message failed to make any mention of freedom of speech and did not describe the deletion of the post as a "mistake"; this prompted Federal MPs to accuse the university of sending mixed messages.

In October 2021, UNSW launched an investigative review after claims of research misconduct on studies pertaining to ageing were made. More than a dozen papers, co-authored by researchers at UNSW, along with other universities were published on PubPeer and found to have duplicated photos that had been modified to represent different experimental results. However, two years later, preliminary assessments of the allegations had not been completed, resulting in an investigation by the Australian Research Integrity Committee in 2023.

In July 2026, a UNSW academic gave evidence to the Royal Commission on Antisemitism and Social Cohesion that four students performed Nazi salutes towards him during a business class. The students were initially issued a formal warning and later suspended after police conducted an investigation.

== See also ==
- ARC Training Centre for Composites
- Initiative
- UNSW College
- UNSW Ranking
