= Arthur Denning =

Arthur Denning (23 April 1901 – 27 March 1975) was an Australian academic. He served as the first director of the University of New South Wales from 1949 to 1952. In 1955, the title of director was changed to Vice-Chancellor.
