= Playford =

Playford may refer to:

== Places ==
- City of Playford, Australia
- Electoral district of Playford, Australia
- Playford B Power Station, South Australia
- Playford, Suffolk, a village in England
- The Playford Hotel in Adelaide, South Australia, part of Accor Hotels

== People ==
- The Playford family of British rowers including
  - Francis Playford (1825-1896)
  - Herbert Playford (1831-1883)
  - Frank Lumley Playford (1855-1931)
  - Humphrey Playford (b 1896)
- The Playford family of Australians, including:
  - Rev. Thomas Playford, aka Thomas Playford I (1795–1873), preacher in South Australia
  - Thomas Playford II, Premier of South Australia
  - Thomas Playford IV, Premier of South Australia
- John Playford, British music publisher, editor of The English Dancing Master
- Henry Playford, John's son, also a music publisher
