= John Erskine Clarke =

British clergyman (1827–1920)

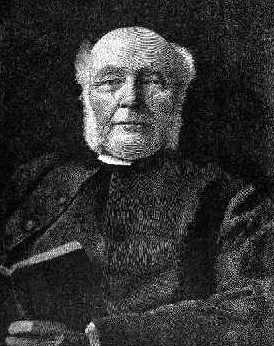
John Erskine Clarke

John Erskine Clarke (1827–1920) was a British clergyman who issued the first parish magazine. He established several other religious publications and was responsible for founding churches schools and hospitals in Battersea. He also competed at Henley Royal Regatta.

Clarke was born at Cossepor, Bengal, India the eldest son of William Fairlie Clarke an official of the East India Company. Clarke's father died in 1835 and the family returned to Edinburgh. He was admitted to Wadham College, Oxford on 26 June 1846. Clarke rowed at Oxford and in 1849 was in the Wadham College eight that won the Grand Challenge Cup at Henley Royal Regatta. In 1850 in a single scull he was runner-up in the Diamond Challenge Sculls to Thomas Bone. In 1851 partnering C L Vaughan in a coxless pair, he was runner up in the Silver Goblets at Henley to James Aitken and Joseph William Chitty.

Clarke took Holy Orders and became curate of St Mary, Low Harrogate in 1851. In 1852 he became curate of St Mary, Lichfield until 1856, when he became vicar of St Michael's Church, Derby. The east gable of St Michael's fell in during a service in 1856 and it was rebuilt in 1858. While he was at St Michael's he started the world's first commercial parish magazine inset, named Parish Magazine, in January 1859. He was an active supporter of the Derby Co-operative Society providing a library and as a representative of the Working Men's Association helped provide for a grocery store. He was also president of what was known as the Happy Home Union. In 1863 he founded The Children's Prize, a paper for young children later called The Prize. In 1866 he moved to St Andrew Derby and set to work with publisher William Macintosh to produce Chatterbox, a weekly paper for older children. The first edition went on sale on 1 December 1866. Clarke became a Prebendary of Lichfield Cathedral in 1869. In 1871 he started Church Bells, another religious weekly newspaper.

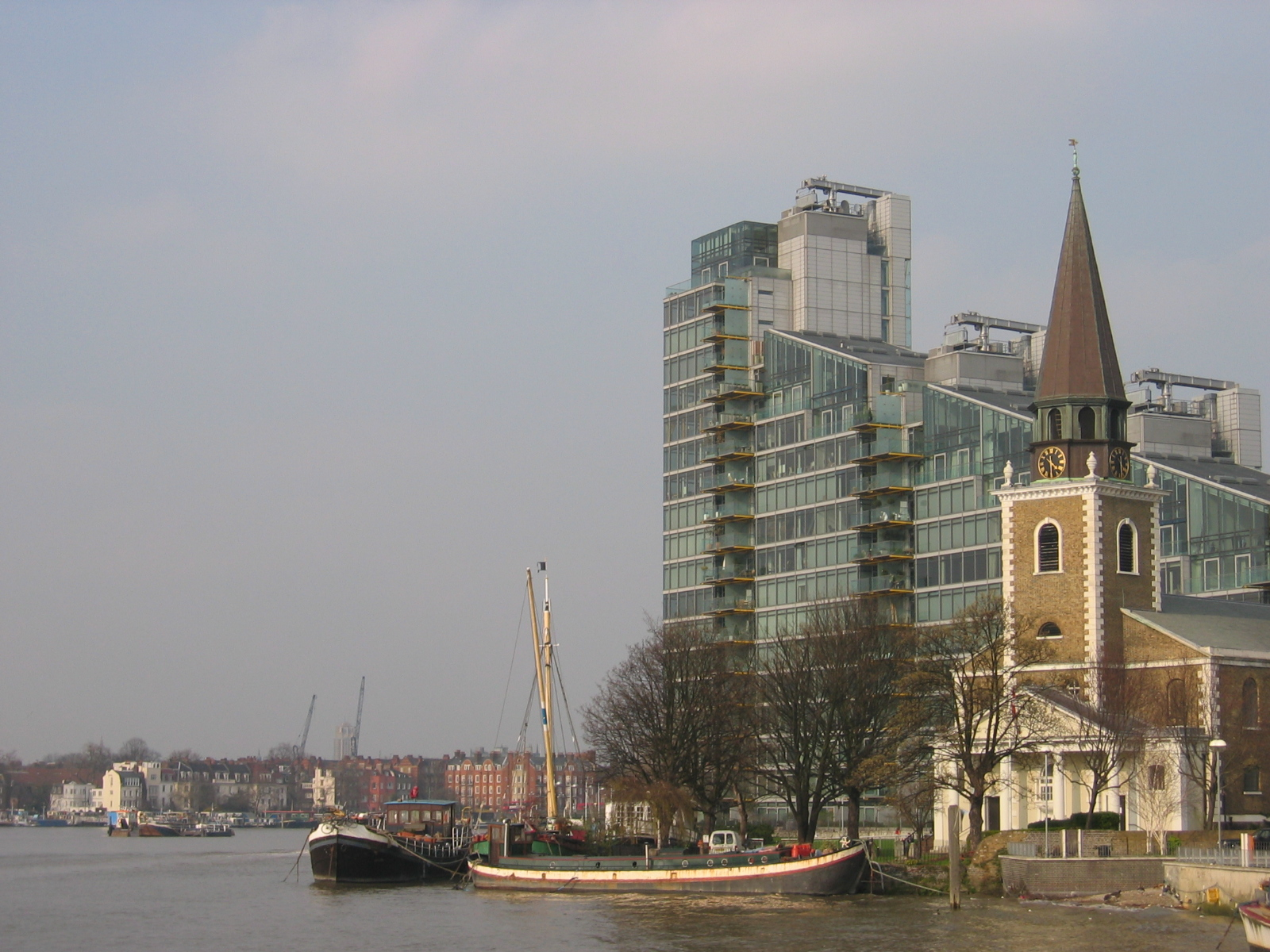
St Mary's Battersea

In 1872, Clarke became Vicar of St Mary's Church, Battersea and remained there for 37 years. There, he founded the "Provident Dispensary" in Battersea, and established "The Vicarage School for Girls" at the vicarage house near the River Thames. The school later moved to Clapham Common. From 1872 until 1916 Clarke was a governor of Sir Walter St John's Trust and was instrumental in establishing Battersea Grammar School. In 1875, he became an Honorary Canon of Winchester Cathedral (Battersea then being in the Diocese of Winchester). Following the transfer of Battersea and several other parishes in the north of Surrey to the Diocese of Rochester in 1877, he was appointed Rural Dean in 1880, and served as diocesan Proctor.

Clarke inspired the building of several churches in Battersea during the second half of the nineteenth century. His own endeavours led to the building of St Mark's, Battersea Rise, St Peter's, Plough Road, St Matthew's and St Luke's in 1889. Clarke was a member of the Board of Governors of the Provident Dispensary (Battersea), and saw an urgent need for an in-patient hospital in Battersea. Through public subscription and charitable gifts, Clarke was able to buy a house in Five Houses Lane, Battersea, (now Bolingbroke Grove) which was owned by Viscount Bolingbroke and established there in 1880 a "House of Sickness" which became the Bolingbroke Hospital. Clarke's aim was that the hospital should provide for "the artisan or self respecting middle class people" who preferred to pay something for their care instead of going into a Poor Law Institution (workhouse).

On 27 July 1895, Clarke was made Honorary Chaplain to Queen Victoria, and after her death in 1901 continued in the same role to King Edward VII. He built a new vicarage for St Luke's on his own property in 1901 and was Vicar of St Luke's from 1901 until 1914. He was appointed Honorary Canon of Southwark in 1905, when the new Anglican Diocese of Southwark was founded. He also continued as an Honorary Chaplain, now to King George V on his accession in 1910.

Clarke suffered a stroke in 1916. He died four years later aged 92 at St Luke's Vicarage and was buried at Elvington, York.

There are memorials to Clarke in St Mary's and St Luke's Churches in Battersea. A house in Battersea Grammar School was named after him.
