= Brasenose College Boat Club =

British rowing club

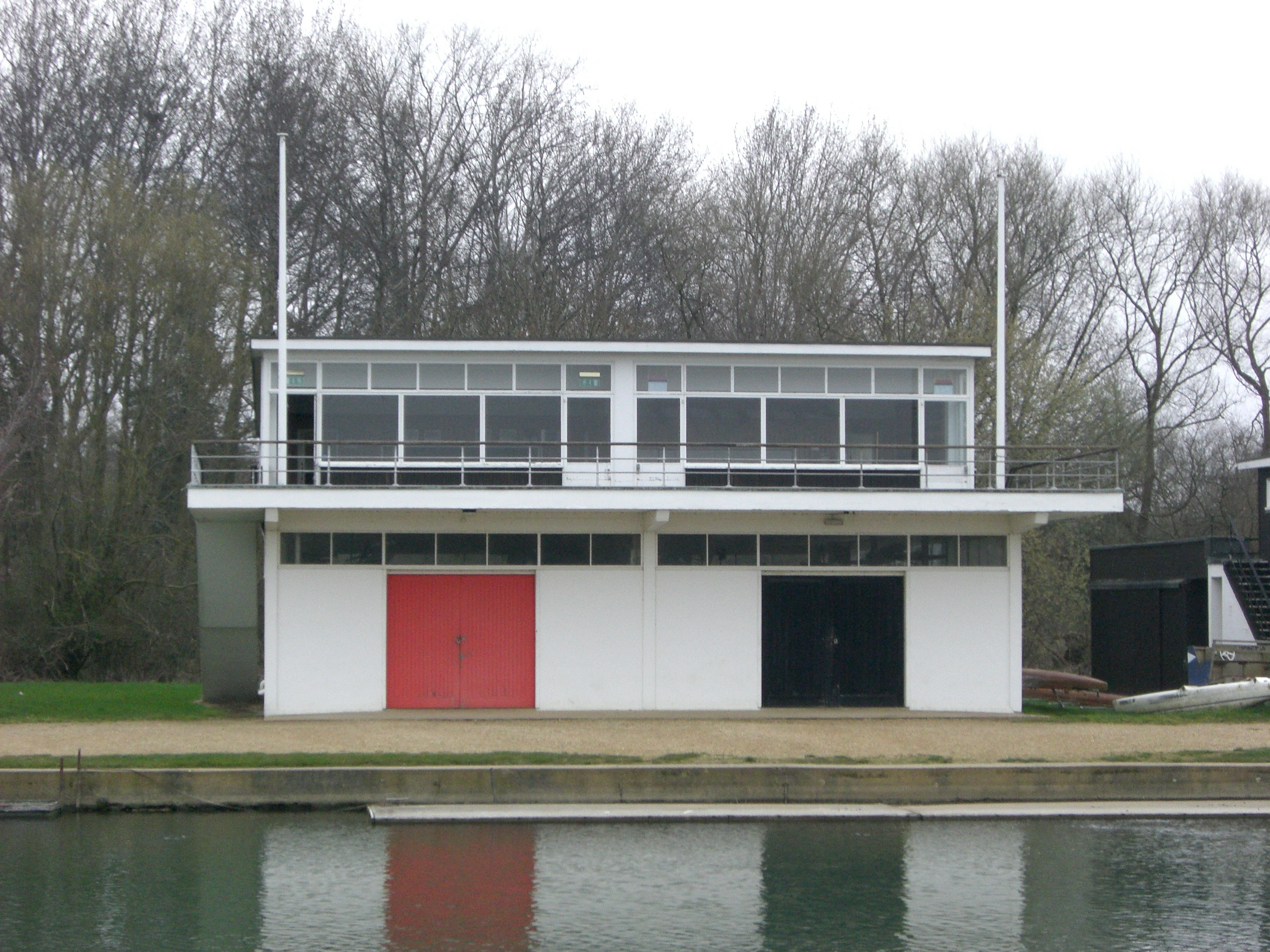

- Brasenose boathouse (right) and rowing blade colours
- Home water: River Thames (known in Oxford as the Isis)
- Founded: terminus ante quem 1815
- Key people: Florence Brooke (President); William Arber & Theo Russell (Co-Vice-Presidents); Emanuel Mavares da Silva (Treasurer); Katrina Lythgoe (Senior Member)
- Head of the River: Men: 1815, 1816, 1821, 1822, 1827, 1839, 1840, 1845, 1846, 1852-54, 1865-67, 1876, 1888-91, 1928-31
- University: University of Oxford
- Colours: (Club) (First Boats)
- Affiliations: British Rowing (boat code BRC); Gonville and Caius College, Cambridge (Sister college)
- Website: www.bncbc.co.uk

Brasenose College Boat Club (BNCBC) is the rowing club of Brasenose College, Oxford, in Oxford, England. It is one of the oldest boat clubs in the world, having beaten Jesus College Boat Club in the first modern rowing race, held at Oxford in 1815. Although rowing at schools such as Eton College and Westminster School predates this, the 1815 contest is the first recorded race between rowing clubs anywhere in the world.

In addition to the 1815 "headship", the club has won both the Summer Eights and Torpids headship many times, and has recorded numerous victories in most events at the Henley Royal Regatta.

The club's colours are black and gold, with black blades. The 1st VIII, however, may wear the distinctive "Childe of Hale" colours — red, purple and gold — which are traditional in Brasenose rowing.

== History ==
=== The beginnings of competitive rowing ===
Brasenose has a long history on the water. The first amateur race between organised clubs which prepared and trained for the event occurred in Oxford in 1815. In this year, crews from Brasenose College and Jesus College raced for the Head of the River, from Iffley Lock to Mr King's Barge, which was moored near the current Head of the River public house. The event is also notable for the fact that both crews rowed in eight oared boats, specially built for the purpose. Such recreational rowing as occurred at this time was usually conducted in pairs, or four or six oared cutters. The fact the racing was conducted in eight oared boats gave rise to the event being known as Eights.

In the early days of Oxford college rowing, these two colleges were the only crews competing, and were joined shortly thereafter by Christ Church and Exeter. Students would row to the inn at Sandford-on-Thames, a few miles south of Oxford, and race each other on the way back. The races would start at Iffley Lock and finish at King's Barge, off Christ Church Meadow. Flags hoisted on the barge would indicate the finishing order of the crews. Crews would set off one behind the other, the trailing boat(s) trying to catch, or "bump", the boat ahead. The bumped boat and the bumping boat would then drop out and the bumping boat would start the next day's race ahead of the bumped boat. The aim was to become the lead boat, known as Head of the River.

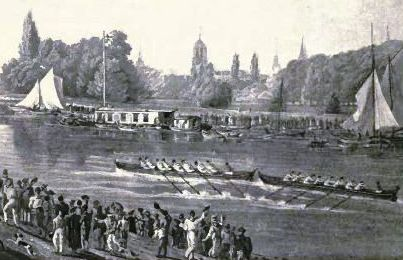
A print of eights racing at Oxford in 1822, thought to depict the Brasenose College boat

In 1822, crews from Jesus and Brasenose raced each other to become Head of the River. One Brasenose rower apparently "caught a crab", slowing the boat. The Brasenose boat was bumped by the Jesus boat, but then began to row again and finished ahead. As there were no definite rules in those days, both the Jesus and Brasenose men competed over which college's flag should be hoisted to denote the Headship. One of the Brasenose crew ended the dispute by saying "Quot homines tot sententiae, different men have different opinions, some like leeks and some like onions", referring to the leek emblem on the Jesus oars, and it was agreed to row the race again. The Brasenose crew won the rematch, and the incident has been said to be shown in an 1822 picture, the earliest depiction of an eights race at Oxford, painted by I. T. Serres (Marine Painter to George IV).

To this day, Brasenose and Jesus Men's 1st VIIIs compete in an annual race on the Isis for the 1815 Challenge Plate.

In 1846 Oxford University Boat Club gave up their barge and this was then used by Brasenose for many years.

For identification, crews wore college colours and emblazoned the rudder of the boat with the college coat of arms.

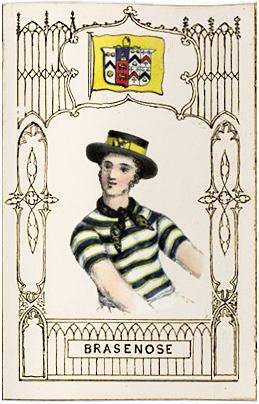
An 1840s depiction of Brasenose college's rowing outfit

=== "Childe of Hale" ===
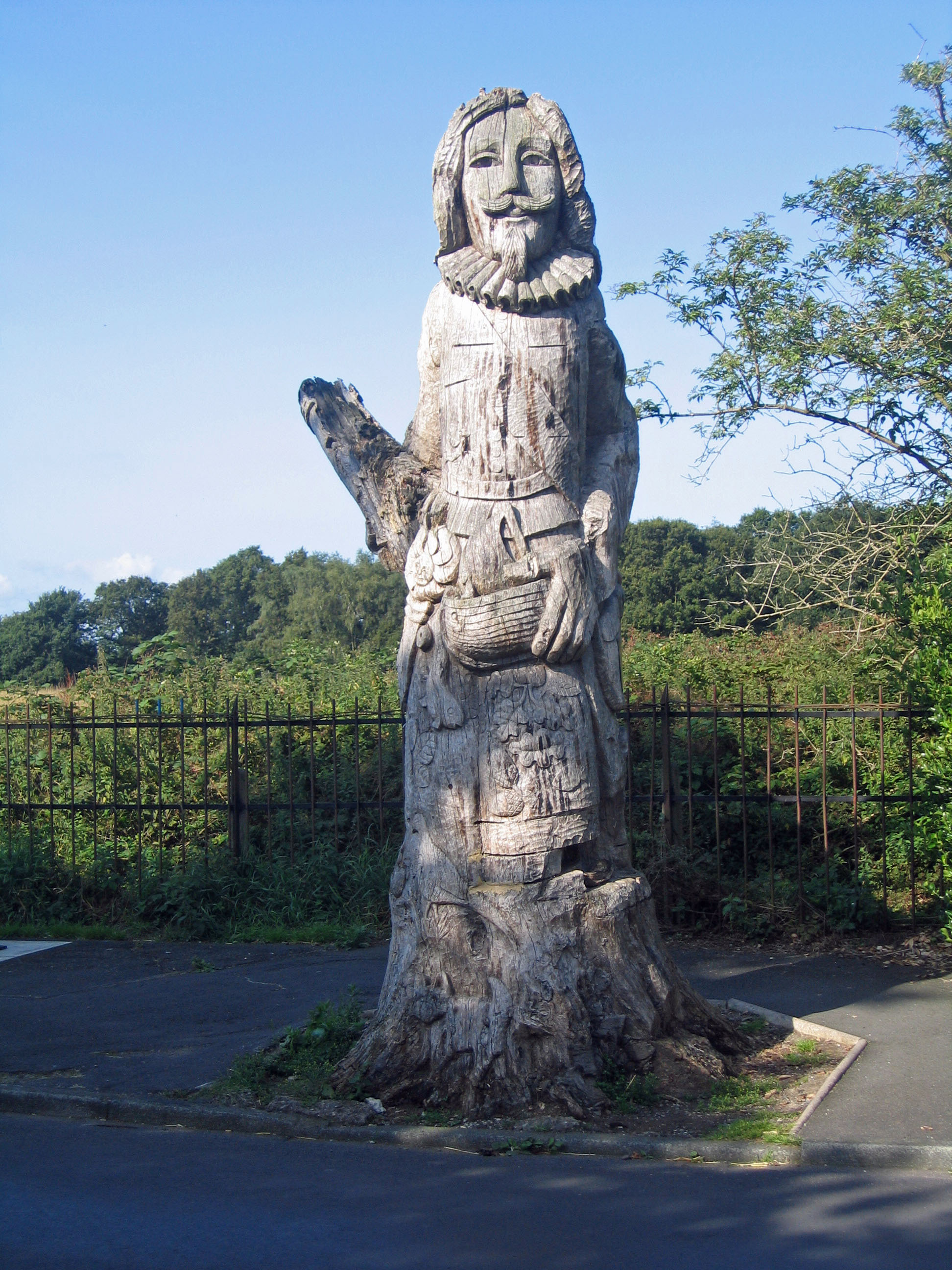
A wooden statue of the Childe of Hale, John Middleton

John Middleton, the "Childe of Hale," was a 17th-century giant, standing over nine feet tall, from Hale in Lancashire. He accompanied his landlord, Sir Gilbert Ireland, to the court of James I, where he took on the King's champion wrestler and won. Sir Gilbert, later Lord of the Manor of Hale, was a member of Brasenose College at the time, and he brought Middleton to College on his return from court, where two life–size portraits were painted of him wearing his "London costume" - a fantastic outfit of red, purple and gold. When, in 1815, the students came to establish a Boat Club, it was this story and tradition that was used as inspiration. The Childe of Hale has since been a role model for generations of rowers and a portrait still hangs in the college.

By tradition, the First VIII is now called "The Childe of Hale," and the First VIII wears the colours of the Childe's London costume — red, purple and gold. This follows an older tradition where each new boat would be given a name.

=== Henley Royal Regatta ===
In the first Henley Regatta of 1839, Brasenose competed in the only race, the Grand Challenge, against two other Oxford boats (the Etonian Club and Wadham) and First Trinity, Cambridge. It is recorded that:

The Etonian Club were dressed in white guernseys with pale blue facings, rosette sky blue. Brasenose had blue striped guernseys, blue cap with gold tassel, rosette yellow, purple and crimson. Wadham wore white guernseys with narrow blue stripes, dark blue cap with light blue velvet band, and light blue scarf, and Trinity College were attired in blue striped guernseys, rosette French Blue.

The race was won by First Trinity, Cambridge. It is suggested the Brasenose crew's prospects of winning the race were impaired by their having rowed their boat down from Oxford - a distance of 47 miles by river - the day before.

Brasenose competed again in 1846, and in 1847 won the Ladies Plate, beating First Trinity, Cambridge.

BNCBC won the Visitors' at Henley in 1851 (the first "Royal" Regatta) rowing as "Childe of Hale Boat Club" in an attempt to hide their identities. They also won the Ladies Plate that year, beating Christ Church Boat Club.

In total, Brasenose College championships at the Henley Royal Regatta include the Diamond Challenge Sculls five times; the Stewards' Challenge Cup twice (in which Brasenose College Boat Club invented the coxless four; see details below); the Ladies' Challenge Plate three times; the Silver Goblets and Nickalls' Challenge Cup six times; the Visitors Challenge Cup six times; the Wyfold Cup once; in addition to winning the Grand Challenge Cup in composites with Leander Club several times in a row in the 1890s.

In 1889, boat club members P.M. Watkins and George Cunningham wrote 'The Song of the Torpid' ('The Togger Song') to serve as BNCBC's club song. It is traditionally sung after bumps dinners and other rowing events.

=== Invention of the coxless four ===
In a cause celebre, Walter Bradford Woodgate introduced the coxless four to the United Kingdom in 1868, when he got his Brasenose cox, Frederic Weatherly (later a well-known lawyer and writer of the song "Danny Boy"), to jump overboard at the start of the Steward's Cup at Henley Royal Regatta. While Weatherley narrowly escaped strangulation by the water lilies, Woodgate and his home-made steering device triumphed by 100 yards and were promptly disqualified.

A special Prize for four-oared crews without coxswains was offered at the regatta in 1869 when it was won by the Oxford Radleian Club and when Stewards’ became a coxless race in 1873, Woodgate "won his moral victory," the Rowing Almanack later recalled. “Nothing but defeating a railway in an action at law could have given him so much pleasure.”

Brasenose and "Childe of Hale Boat Club" went on to record legitimate victories in the event.

Two years later, Woodgate founded Vincent's Club as "an elite social club of the picked hundred of the University, selected for all round qualities; social, physical and intellectual".

=== Women's rowing and recent history ===
The participation of women in the BNCBC was made possible with the admission of women undergraduates in 1974, and a BNCBC Women's crew first contested Eights in 1976. Since that time, women members of BNCBC have represented Oxford in OUWBC Blue Boat, Osiris and OUWLRC crews, alongside their male colleagues who have competed in OUBC Blue Boat, Isis, OULRC Blue Boat and Nephthys crews.

The Childe of Hale (M1) made a strong bid to regain the headship in the 1990s, bumping as high as second on the river in Torpids and fourth on the river in Summer Eights. Since 1990, BNCBC Men's 1st VIII crews have finished as high as fourth in Summer Eights, and BNCBC Women's 1st VIII crews have finished as high as second in Summer Eights.

== Honours ==
=== Henley Royal Regatta ===
Year	Race	Crew members
1847	Ladies Plate	D. Jones (bow), P. Earle, J. Oldham, J.A. Ogle, F.C. Royds, W.H. Smith, G.R. Winter, T.W. Nowell, R.H. Knight (cox)
1851	Ladies Plate	O.K. Prescott (bow), P.H. Moore, H. Barton, W. Houghton, J.J. Hornby, J.L. Errington, K. Prescott, R. Greenall, St.J. Balguy (cox)
1861	Wyfold Cup	R. Shepard (bow), W.C. Harris, W. Champneys, W.B. Woodgate, C.I Parkin (cox)
1861	Silver Goblets	W Champneys, W.B. Woodgate
1862	Stewards' Cup	W.C. Harris(bow), R. Shepherd, W. Champneys, W.B. Woodgate, C.I. Parkin (cox)
1862	Visitors' Cup	W.C. Harris(bow), R. Shepherd, W. Champneys, W.B. Woodgate, E.G.R. Parr (cox)
1862	Silver Goblets	W Champneys, W.B. Woodgate
1863	Silver Goblets	W.B. Woodgate, R. Shepherd
1863	Visitors' Cup	W.C. Harris(bow), D. Pocklington, R. Shepherd, W.B. Woodgate, F.J. Huyshe (cox)
1864	Diamond Challenge Sculls	W.B. Woodgate
1867	Diamond Challenge Sculls	W.C. Crofts
1868	Silver Goblets	W.C. Crofts, W.B. Woodgate
1869	Diamond Challenge Sculls	W.C. Crofts
1877	Diamond Challenge Sculls	T C Edwards-Moss
1878	Diamond Challenge Sculls	T.C. Edwards-Moss
1882	Visitors' Cup	A.W. Arkle (bow), E.L. Puxley, R.A. Baillie, P.Y. Gowlland
1888	Visitors' Cup	W.C. Kent (bow), W.F.C. Holland, H.R. Parker, L. Frere
1890	Visitors' Cup	C.H. Hodgson (bow), J.A. Ford, F. Wilkinson, C.W. Kent
1890	Stewards' Cup	W.F.C. Holland (bow), J.A. Ford, F. Wilkinson, C.W. Kent
1922	Ladies Plate	D.C. Bennett (bow), W.P. Mellen, A.R. Armitage, J.G. Mower-White, W.T. Lindesay, P.R. Wace, E.S. Collie, E.D. Wetton, F.L. Garton (cox)
1930	Visitors' Cup	L.C.R. Balding (bow), R.A.J. Poole, A. Graham, C.M. Johnston

=== Boat Race representatives ===
The following rowers were part of the rowing club at the time of their participation in The Boat Race.

Men's boat race

Year	Name
1839	R. G. Walls
1840	R. G. Walls
1840	E. Royds
1840	Godfrey Meynell
1840	J. J. T. Somers Cocks
1840	W. B. Garnett (cox)
1841	E. Royds
1841	Wm. Lea
1841	Godrey Meynell
1841	J. J. T. Somers-Cocks
1845	F. E. Tuke
1846	F. C. Royds
1849	J. J. Hornby
1849	W. Houghton
1852	O. K. Prescott
1852	R. Greenall
1852	W. Houghton
1859	H. F. Baxter
1860	H. F. Baxter
1861	W. Champneys
1862	Walter Bradford Woodgate
1863	R. Shepherd
1863	Walter Bradford Woodgate
1864	Duncan Pocklington
1866	F. Crowder
1867	F. Crowder
1871	J. M. Clintock-Bubury
1873	M. G. Farrer
1874	H. W. Benson
1874	J. P. Way
1875	H. P. Marriott
1875	Tom Cottingham Edwards-Moss
1875	J. P. Way
1876	H. P. Marriott
1876	Tom Cottingham Edwards-Moss
1877	Tom Cottingham Edwards-Moss
1877	H. P. Marriott
1878	Tom Cottingham Edwards-Moss
1878	H. P. Marriott
1879	H. P. Marriott
1880	R. H. J. Poole
1881	R. H. J. Poole
1883	E. L. Puxley
1885	F. J. Humphreys (cox)
1887	W. F. C. Holland
1887	H. R. Parker

Year	Name
1888	W. F. C. Holland
1888	H. R. Parker
1888	L. Freere
1889	H. R. Parker
1889	W. F.C Holland
1890	W. F. C. Holland
1891	F. Wilkinson
1891	C. W. Kent
1892	J. A. Ford
1893	J. A. Ford
1894	W. Burton Stewart
1895	W. Burton Stewart
1896	H. R. K. Pechell (cox)
1897	H. R. K. Pechell (cox)
1898	H. R. K. Pechell (cox)
1901	H. C. de J. Du Vallon
1904	P. C. Underhill
1910	N. Field
1923	P. R. Wace
1923	G. J. Mower-White
1923	W. P. Mellen
1924	P. R. Wace
1924	G. J. Mower-White
1924	W. P. Mellen
1925	G. J. Mower-White
1926	G. H. Crawford
1926	J. H. Croft (cox)
1927	J. H. Croft (cox)
1928	H. C. Morphett
1928	J. H. Croft (cox)
1929	H. C. Morphett
1929	A. Graham
1930	C. M. Johnston
1931	G. M. L. Smith
1931	C. M. Johnston
1931	R. A. J. Poole
1931	R. W. G. Holdsworth
1932	G. M. L. Smith
1932	J. de R. Kent
1932	C. M. Johnston
1932	R. A. J. Poole
1933	R. W. G. Holdsworth
1934	R. W. G. Holdsworth
1936	S. R. C. Wood
1936	John Cherry
1937	John Cherry

Year	Name
1938	John Cherry
1948	W. W. Woodward
1949	W. J. H. Leckie
1953	E. C. B. Hammond
1954	E. V. Vine
1955	E. V. Vine
1956	E. V. Vine
1961	J. O. B. Sewall
1993	Richard H Manners
1993	Samantha L Benham (cox)
1997	Andrew Lindsay
1997	Roberto Blanda
1998	Andrew Lindsay
1999	Andrew Lindsay
2002	Dan Perkins
2004	Joel Scrogin
2007	Michal Plotkowiak
2009	Michal Plotkowiak
2014	Tom Watson
2022	Jack Tottem (cox)

Women's boat race

Year	Name
2017	Jenna Herbert
2021	Katie Anderson

=== Headships ===
Brasenose holds the second most consecutive headships in Torpids (a 9-year unbeaten streak) behind Oriel College. This makes Brasenose the third most successful college boat club in Oxford, behind Oriel College and Christ Church.

In the Summer Eights Brasenose held headship in the following years:

- 1815, 1816, 1821, 1822, 1827, 1839, 1840, 1845, 1846, 1852–54, 1865–67, 1876, 1888–91, 1928-31.

== Notable people ==
Brasenose has a rich tradition of representation in The Boat Race and in the other Oxford and Cambridge races. Below are the names of Brasenose students past and present who have won "blues" or colours competing for OUBC and the other university boats.

One of the most celebrated of Brasenose College oarsmen was the larger-than-life Walter Bradford Woodgate, who once wagered he could walk the fifty-seven miles from Stones Chop House in London's Panton Street (near Leicester Square) to Brasenose in time for breakfast. The leading oarsman of his age, he won eleven Henley titles in the 1860s, including three in two days in 1862, when he narrowly missed a fourth victory after dead-heating the final of the Diamonds. Along with Edwin Brickwood, he was one of the earliest chroniclers of rowing in the United Kingdom.

Famous past Brasenose oarsmen include C. W. Kent, reputed to be the greatest stroke in the world in the 1890s, and John Conrad "Con" Cherry, a winning Boat Race stroke, and President of OUBC, who was President of Leander Club at the time of his death in World War II.

More recently, another well-known BNCBC member was Andrew Lindsay, a member of the Great Britain Olympic Eight that won the gold medal at the 2000 Summer Olympics.

Other notable members of BNCBC include Bill O'Chee, Michelle Dipp, John Cherry, Guy Spier, Dominic Barton, Walter Bradford Woodgate and John Buchan, 2nd Baron Tweedsmuir.

Among its various coaches, Brasenose College Boat Club enjoyed the services of Rudy Lehmann for five years from 1887 to 1891. In 1894 and 1895, Lehmann was captain of Leander Club, and was responsible for recruiting a number of prominent Brasenose oarsmen into winning Leander crews in successive Grand Challenge Cup races at Henley Royal Regatta. After resigning as coach of the College's 1st VIII, he donated a silver cup to the college.

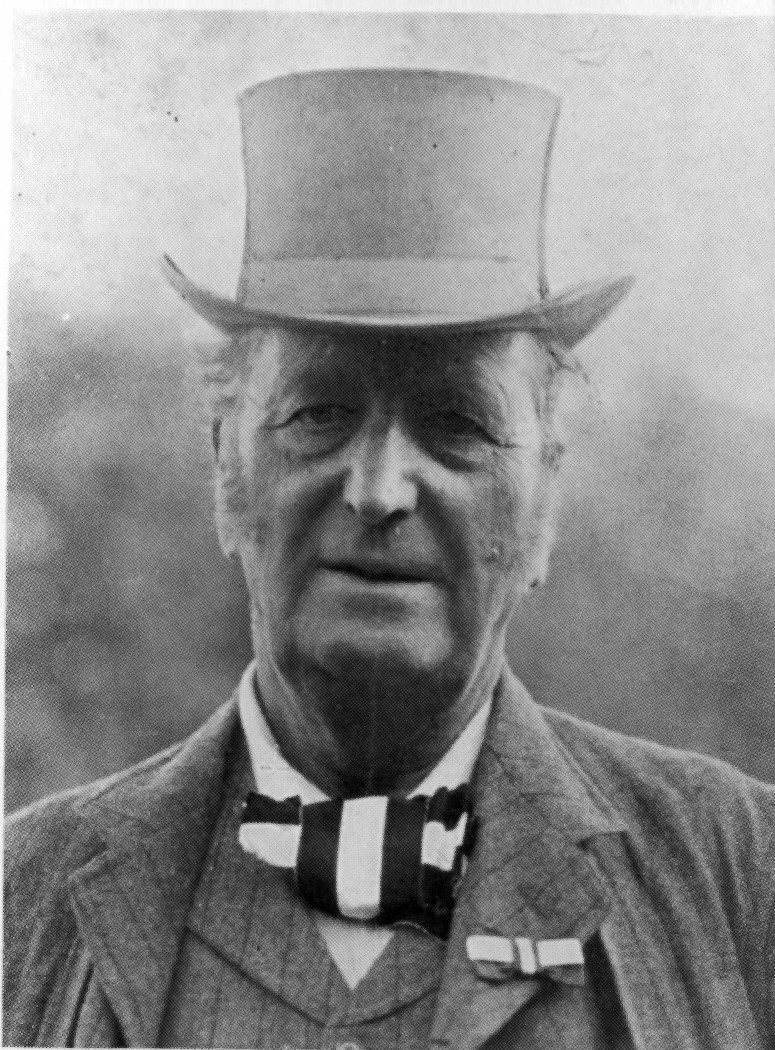
Walter Woodgate, Boat Race winner, eight-time Henley champion, and inventor of the coxless four

Lightweight and reserve crew representation

Isis (OUBC reserves)	OULRC Blue Boat	Nephthys (OULRC reserves)	OUWBC	Osiris (OUWBC reserves)	OUWLRC
T. Watson (2011,2012) J.L. Carlson (Cox, 2010) E.P. Newman (2010) A.N. Keats (2005) T.H. Baker (2001) T.J. Whitaker (1993) K.W. Kobach (1991, 1992) E.M. Martin (1983, 1984) J.O.B. Sewall (1959, 1960) G.B. Hill (1948) D. Moffatt (1947) John Cherry (1935)	J.A Villanueva Moreno (2016) V. Stulgis (Cox, 2012) J.L. Carlson (Cox, 2011) M. Neve (2010) B. Bell (1998) D. Brocklebank (1997) J. Bailey (1995) D. Bridges (1995) R. Weeks (1994) D. Long (1990) D. Horner (1989) P. Drew (1988) W.G. O’Chee (1987) J. Hawkins (1986) J. Kirwan (1986)	T. Gunter (2012) H. Engel (2007) O. Gilmore (2002) D. Foster (1989)	S. Williams (1976) A. Brown (1981) C. Richens (1984, 1985) S. Shekleton (1986) C. Taylor (1986) A. Crawford (1987) A. Hadfield (1989, 1990, 1991) K. Cross (1990) S. Benham (1992) J. Leach (1992) M. Morris (1996) K. White (1996) N. Waddell (1998, 2000, 2001)	S. Sheckleton (1985) A. Bailes (1987) E. Taylor & A. Hadfield (1988) K. Cross (1989) K. Houghton (1990, 1991) J. Leach (1993) A.V. Manen (2003) K. Anderson & J. Allen (2019)	Dom Shields (1998) Roma Backhouse (1998) Sarah Phipps (1993) Karen Ball (1992)

== Gallery ==
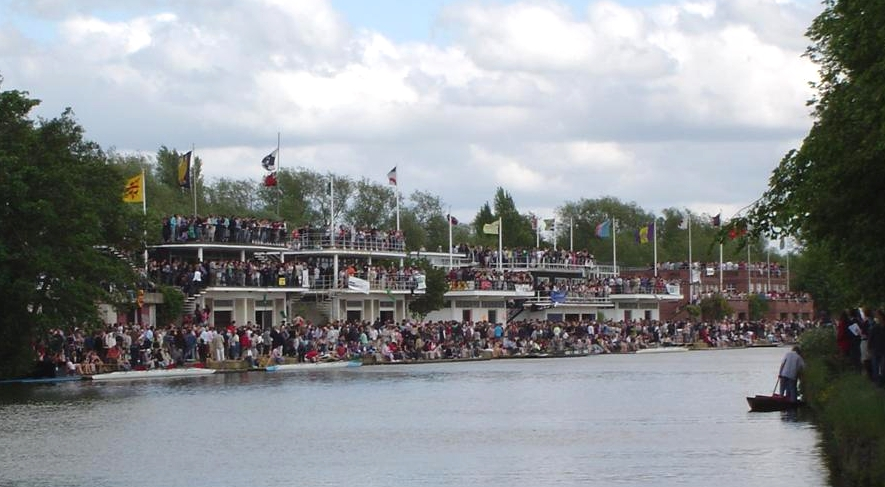
College boathouses on the Isis at Summer Eights; BNC's is fourth from left.
