= Charles Vincent Fox =

British Army officer and rower (1877–1928)

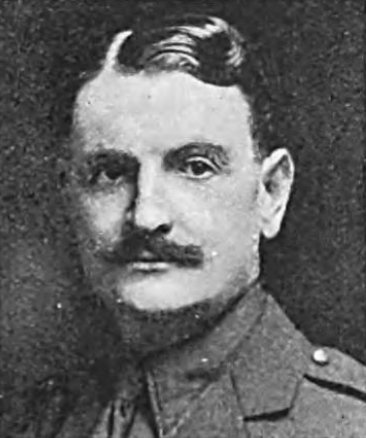
- Born: 1877; Dublin, Ireland
- Died: 8 November 1928; Dublin, Ireland
- Military career
- Allegiance: United Kingdom
- Branch: British Army
- Service years: 1899–1918
- Rank: Major
- Unit: Scots Guards
- Conflicts: World War I: First Battle of Ypres
- Awards: Distinguished Service Order

Charles Vincent Fox, DSO (1877 – 8 November 1928) was a British Army officer and rower who won the Diamond Challenge Sculls at Henley Royal Regatta in 1901 and the Wingfield Sculls in 1900.

Fox was born in Dublin in 1877, the son of Henry and Mary Fox. His father was an agent for Dundalls Whisky and by 1881 had moved to Swanscombe, Kent. Fox was educated at Prior Park College, Bath and Pembroke College, Oxford. He then joined the Scots Guards and rowed for the Guards Brigade Rowing Club. In 1899 he entered the Wingfield Sculls but lost to B H Howell. He won the event in 1900. Fox went to the 1900 Summer Olympics in Paris but withdrew before the regatta started. In 1901 he won the Diamond Challenge Sculls at Henley, beating St G Ashe.

Fox was promoted to lieutenant on 23 April 1902, and served with the Southern Nigeria Regiment of the West African Frontier Force. On the outbreak of World War I he was with the British Expeditionary Force and took part in the First Battle of Ypres. On 25 October he defended a breach in the line and captured five German officers and 200 men, and as a result was awarded the DSO. He was captured and made three escape attempts, on one occasion throwing himself from a train. He made his last successful escape attempt from Schwarmstedt Camp in June 1917. In the course of his run to the border, travelling with a Lieutenant Blank, he met up with Captain John Caunter who in his chronicle of his time in German camps and his escape described Fox's experiences in detail. Fox provided evidence of an atrocity at the Brandenburg Camp, writing on 10 July 1917 that before he arrived at the camp, an Englishman had been burned alive because guards would not let prisoners out of a burning building.

He died at Milltown, Dublin on 8 November 1928.
