= 1866 AAC Championships =

Outdoor track and field competition

- Dates: 23 March 1866
- Host city: London, England
- Venue: Beaufort House, Walham Green, London
- Level: Senior
- Type: Outdoor

The 1866 AAC Championships was an outdoor track and field competition organised by the Amateur Athletic Club (AAC). The championships were held on 23 March 1866, in the grounds of Thomas Jones, 7th Viscount Ranelagh's Beaufort House.

Thomas Milvain, winner of the hurdles

== Summary ==
- A cup was presented to each winner and a medal was awarded to second place. Paid admission was required.
- The athletes consisted primarily of University students.
- Richard Garnett set a world record of 21:41.0 in the 4 miles race and also set a world record at the 3 miles intermediate of 16:27.0.
- John H. S. Roupell and J. C. Little set a world record when both jumped 1.753m in the high jump event.

== Results ==
Event	1st			2nd			3rd		
100 yards	Thomas M. Colmore	Brasenose	10½	Robert W. Vidal	St John's, Ox	6 inches	William Collett	London RC	½ yd
quarter-mile	John H. Ridley	Eton	55.0	Anthony J. Wilkinson	Anomalies CC	6 yd	Charles W. Beardsell	Lincoln's Inn	
half-mile	Percy Thornton	Blackheath Park	2:05.0	William C. Gibbs	Jesus, Cm	10 yd	Edward Michell	Magdalen	
1 mile	Charles Lawes	Trinity College	4:39.0	William Bowman	Univ C	12 yd	W. M. Chinnery	London AC	
4 miles	Richard C. Garnett	Trinity College	21:41.0 WR	Edward Royds	Eton	15 yd	Bernard C. Molloy	London RC	
120yd hurdles	Thomas Milvain	Trinity Hall	17¾	(United States) Louis Tiffany	Emmanuel	½ yd	John P. Martin	Exeter C	
7 miles walk	John Chambers	Public Schools Club	59:32 NR	R.M. McKerell	Trinity College	60 yd	W. Doig	St John's, Cm	15 yd
high jump	John H. S. Roupell; J. C. Little	Trinity Hall; Peterhouse	1.753 WR; 1.753 WR	n/a			Charles E. Greene	Trinity College	1.676
high pole jump	J. Wheeler	Wandsworth Club	3.05	F. Ewbank	Clare	2.90	Richard Lambert	Civil Service	2.51
broad jump	Richard Fitzherbert	St John's, Cm	5.99	Thomas G. Little	Peterhouse	5.89	Robert W. Smith	Horse Artillery	
shot put	Charles Fraser	London	10.62	George Elliot	Trinity College	9.25	C. C. Cheston	Merton	absent
hammer throw	Richard J. James	Jesus, Cm	23.88	David Morgan	Magdalen	22.86	D. Moffatt	Christ Church	
