= William Crofts (rower) =

- Born: February 10, 1846
- Died: November 26, 1912 (aged 66)
- Occupations: Schoolmaster and rower

William Carr Crofts (10 February 1846 – 26 November 1912) was an English schoolmaster and rower who won the Diamond Challenge Sculls at Henley Royal Regatta twice and was an influential teacher of Rudyard Kipling.

Crofts was born at Hampstead, the eldest son of William Crofts, a barrister. He attended Bedford School, where he was head boy, and in 1864 he went to Merton College, Oxford. After a year he gained a first in Moderations, and was awarded a scholarship to Brasenose College, Oxford. He won the Reading Prize and became a Hulme Exhibitioner. He studied "Greek, Latin, Logic, Philology and elegant translation". In his second year he became involved in rowing and in 1867 won the Diamond Challenge Sculls at Henley. In 1868 he lost the Diamond Challenge Sculls to Stout, but won the Silver Goblets with W B Woodgate. He won the Diamond Challenge Sculls again in 1869. At Oxford he was Captain of the Brasenose College Eight, but did not take part in the Boat Race.

Distracted by rowing and other social activities, he managed a third in his finals, and a year after graduation he joined the staff of a prep school. He moved school four times in six years before arriving in 1875 at the United Services College at Westward Ho!. In 1879 he became senior classics master and senior housemaster. It was at the school that he taught Rudyard Kipling. Crofts has been seen as the model for Kipling's character "Mr King" in Stalky & Co. He resigned from USC in 1892 after differences with the proprietor and moved between jobs as a tutor and a partner in Lunn's travel agency. He settled on the island of Sark where he took a swim in the sea regularly throughout the year and was drowned in one of these outings in November 1912.
