= Benjamin Howell =

Benjamin Howell may refer to:

- Benjamin Franklin Howell (1844–1933), U.S. Representative from New Jersey
- Benjamin Hunting Howell (1875–?), American rower
