= Diamond Challenge Sculls =

Rowing event at the Henley Royal Regatta

- Venue: Henley Royal Regatta, River Thames
- Location: Henley-on-Thames, Oxfordshire
- Dates: 1844 – present

The Diamond Challenge Sculls is a rowing event for men's single sculls at the annual Henley Royal Regatta on the River Thames at Henley-on-Thames in England. First run in 1844, it is open to male scullers from all eligible rowing clubs.

The Diamond Challenge Sculls, the Wingfield Sculls and the London Cup in the Metropolitan Regatta make up the "Triple Crown" of the three premier single sculling events in the United Kingdom.

== Past winners ==
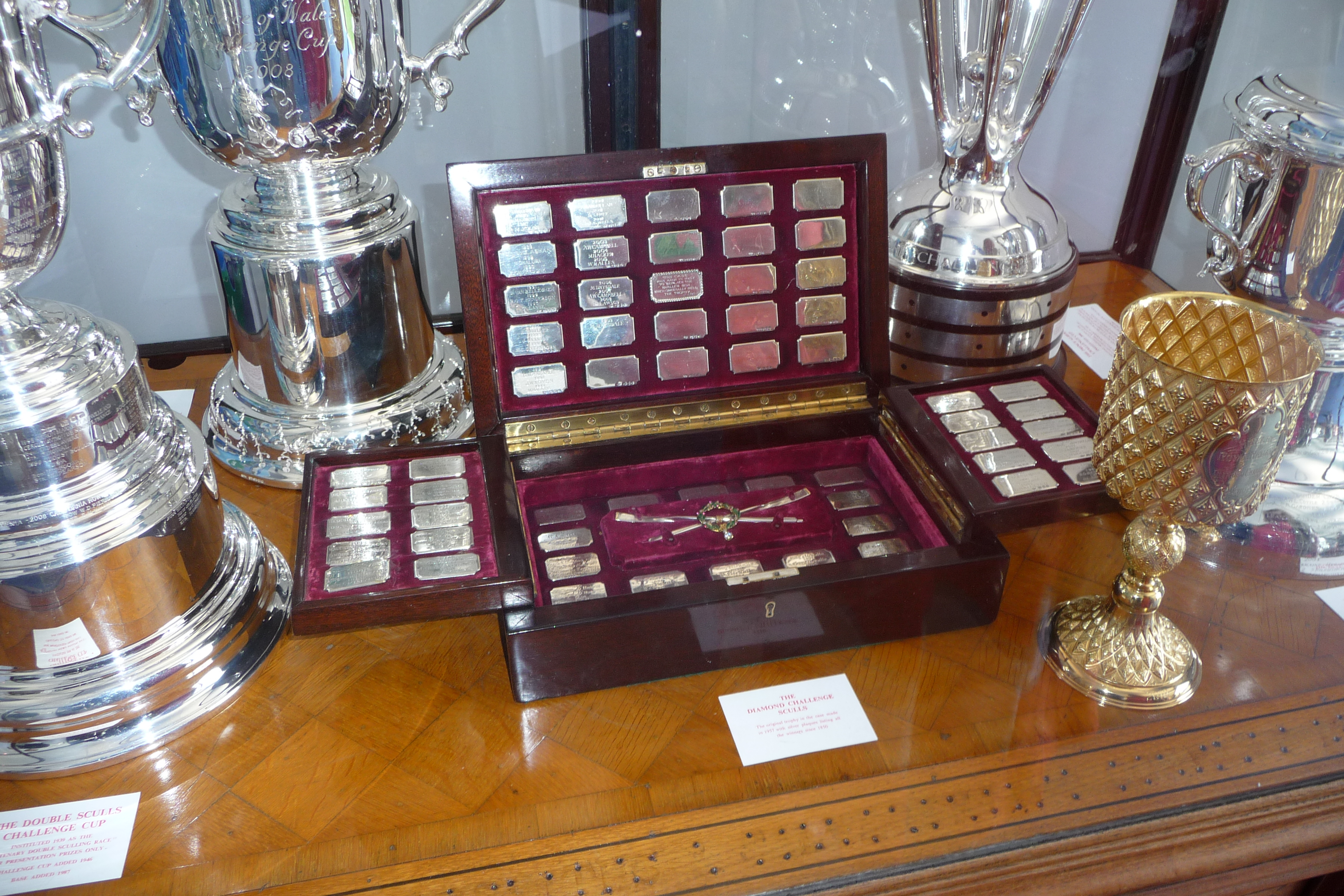
The Diamond Challenge Sculls trophy (centre in wooden case)

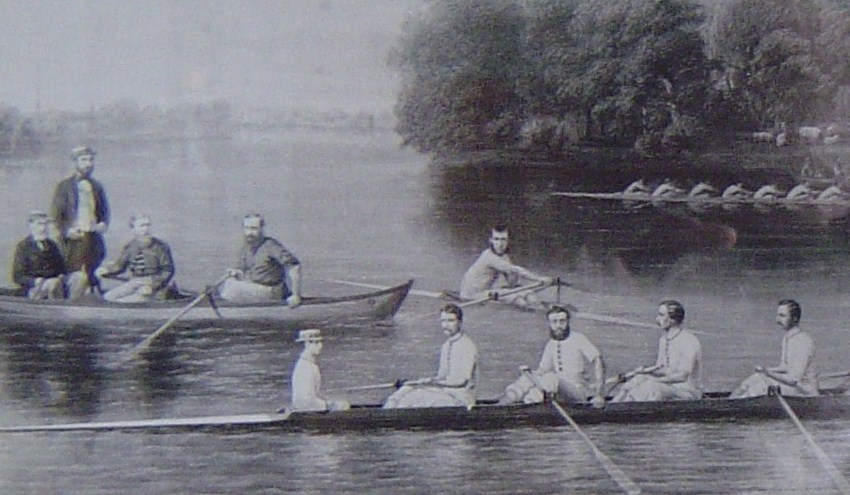
Alexander Alcée Casamajor (single scull) five-time winner in the mid-19th century

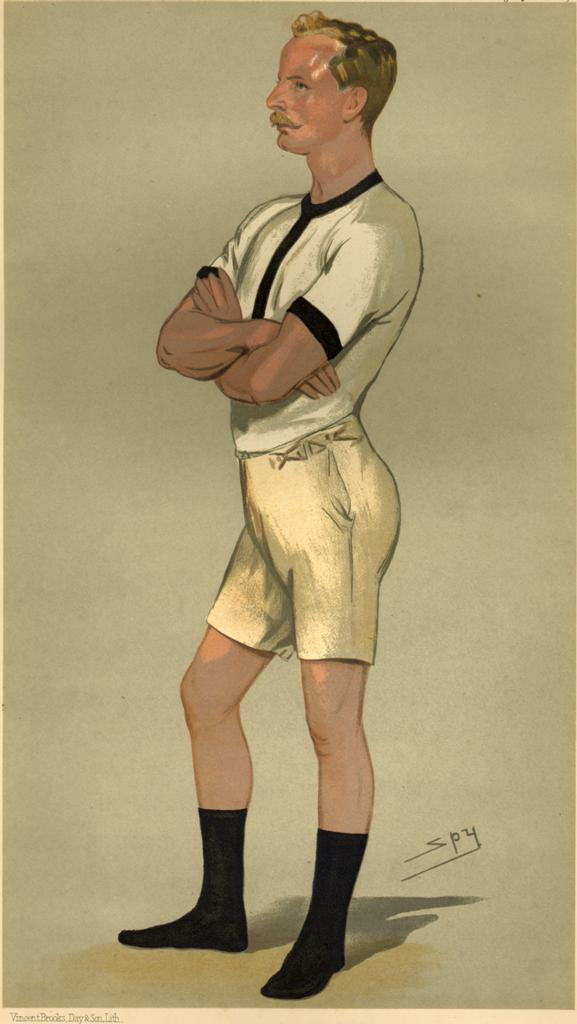
Guy Nicholls caricature from 1889

Year	Winner	Club	Runner-up	Club	ref
1844	Thomas Bumpsted	Scullers Club, London	H Morgan	Christ Church, Ox	
1845	S Wallace	Leander Club	J W Conant	St. John's College, Ox	
1846	Sir Edward Moon	Magdalen College, Oxford	Thomas Howard Fellows	Leander Club	
1847	William Maule	Trinity College, Cm	Edward Moon	Magdalen College, Ox	
1848	William Bagshawe	Trinity College, Cm	W Wilberforce	Oxford University BC	
1849	Thomas Bone	London	C S Bagot	Trinity College, Cm	
1850	Thomas Bone	Meteor Club, London	John Erskine Clarke	Wadham College	
1851	Edward Gryffydh Peacock	Thames Club	Edward Macnaghten	Trinity College, Cm	
1852	Edward Macnaghten	Trinity College, Cm	Edward Gryffydh Peacock	London	
1853	Stephen Rippingall	Peterhouse, Cm	Martin Howy Irving	Balliol College, Ox	
1854	Herbert Playford	Wandle Club, London	R C Galton	Trinity College, Cm	
1855	A. A. Casamajor	Wandle Club, London	Herbert Playford	Wandle Club	
1856	A. A. Casamajor	Argonaut Club, London	C Stephens	Caversham BC	
1857	A. A. Casamajor	London RC	James Paine	London RC	
1858	A. A. Casamajor	London RC	rowed over	n/a	
1859	Edwin Brickwood	Richmond RC	R Beaumont	Third Trinity, Cm	
1860	Herbert Playford	London RC	Edwin Brickwood	London	
1861	A. A. Casamajor	London RC	Edwin Brickwood	London	
1862	Edwin Brickwood	London RC	Walter Bradford Woodgate	Brasenose College, Ox	
1863	Charles Bennett Lawes	Third Trinity, Cm	Edwin Brickwood	London	
1864	Walter Bradford Woodgate	Brasenose College, Ox	Edward Michell	Magdalen College, Ox	
1865	Edward Michell	Magdalen College, Ox	Charles Bennett Lawes	Third Trinity, Cm	
1866	Edward Michell	Magdalen College, Ox	Walter Bradford Woodgate	Kingston RC	
1867	William Crofts	Brasenose College, Ox	Frank Willan	Exeter College, Ox	
1868	William Stout	London Rowing Club	William Crofts	Brasenose College, Ox	
1869	William Crofts	Brasenose College, Oxford	A C Yarborough	Lincoln College, Ox	
1870	John Brooks Close	First Trinity, Cm	R J Waldie-Griffith	Jesus College, Cm	
1871	William Fawcus	Tynemouth RC	John Goldie	Lady Margaret BC, Cm	
1872	Clement Courtenay Knollys	Magdalen College, Ox	C H Lawton	York	
1873	Alfred Dicker	Lady Margaret, Cm	W Chillingworth	Twickenham RC	
1874	Alfred Dicker	Lady Margaret, Cm	William Fawcus	Tynemouth RC	
1875	Alfred Dicker	Lady Margaret, Cm	William Brooks Close	Cambridge	
1876	Frank Lumley Playford	London RC	Robert Labat	London RC	
1877	Tom Edwards-Moss	Brasenose College, Ox	A V Frere	Kingston RC	
1878	Tom Edwards-Moss	Brasenose College, Ox	Jefferson Lowndes	Hertford College, Ox	
1879	Jefferson Lowndes	Hertford College, Ox	Frank Lumley Playford	London RC	
1880	Jefferson Lowndes	Derby School RC	C E Adam	Oxford	
1881	Jefferson Lowndes	Derby School RC	Achilles Wild	Frankfurt, GER	
1882	Jefferson Lowndes	Derby School RC	Alexandre Lein	Paris, FRA	
1883	Jefferson Lowndes	Twickenham RC	Achilles Wild	Frankfurt, GER	
1884	William Sully Unwin	Magdalen College, Ox	R H Smith	Thames RC	
1885	William Sully Unwin	Magdalen College, Ox	Frederick I Pitman	Third Trinity, Cm	
1886	Frederick Pitman	Third Trinity, Cm	William Sully Unwin	Magdalen College, Ox	
1887	James Cardwell Gardner	Emmanuel College, Cm	Guy Nickalls	Magdalen College, Oxford	
1888	Guy Nickalls	Magdalen College, Ox	E Doering	F Hammonia BC, GER	
1889	Guy Nickalls	Magdalen College, Ox	Charles J Psotta	New York AC, USA	
1890	Guy Nickalls	Magdalen College, Ox	Gilbert Kennedy	Kingston RC	
1891	Vivian Nickalls	Magdalen College, Ox	rowed over	n/a	
1892	Janus Ooms	Neptune RC, NED	S M Boyd	Trinity College, Dublin, IRE	
1893	Guy Nickalls	Magdalen College, Ox	Gilbert Kennedy	Kingston RC	
1894	Guy Nickalls	Formosa BC	Vivian Nickalls	Magdalen College, Ox	
1895	Rupert Guinness	Leander Club	Guy Nickalls	London RC	
1896	Rupert Guinness	Leander Club	Rupert Kendall Beaumont	Burton-On-Trent RC	
1897	Edward Ten Eyck	Wachusett, USA	Harry Blackstaffe	Vesta RC	
1898	Benjamin Hunting Howell	Trinity Hall, Cm	Harry Blackstaffe	Vesta RC	
1899	Benjamin Hunting Howell	Thames RC	Harry Blackstaffe	Vesta RC	
1900	Edward Hemmerde	University College, Ox	Benjamin Hunting Howell	Thames RC	
1901	Charles Vincent Fox	Guards Brigade RC	St G Ashe	Thames RC	
1902	Frederick Septimus Kelly	Balliol College, Ox	Raymond Etherington-Smith	Leander Club	
1903	Frederick Septimus Kelly	Leander Club	Julius Beresford	Kennsington RC	
1904	Lou Scholes	Toronto RC, CAN	Arthur Cloutte	London RC	
1905	Frederick Septimus Kelly	Leander Club	Harry Blackstaffe	Vesta RC	
1906	Harry Blackstaffe	Vesta RC	William Darell	Household Brigade	
1907	William Darell	Household Brigade	Alexander McCulloch	University College, Ox	
1908	Alexander McCulloch	Leander Club	Athol Alexander Stuart	Kingston RC	
1909	Athol Alexander Stuart	Kingston RC	Rudolph Lucas	Mainz RC, GER	
1910	Wally Kinnear	Kensington RC	Rudolph Lucas	Mainz RC, GER	
1911	Wally Kinnear	Kensington RC	Eric Powell	Vikings Club	
1912	Eric Powell	Vikings Club	Alexander McCulloch	Leander Club	
1913	Cecil McVilly	Derwent RC, AUS	Edward Dennis P Pinks	London RC	
1914	Giuseppe Sinigaglia	Lario Club, Como, ITA	Colin M Stuart	Trinity Hall, Cm	
No races 1915–1919 (WWI)

=== 1920 to 1939 ===
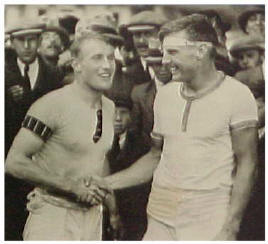
Jack Beresford (left) congratulates Walter Hoover (right) after the final of the Diamond Sculls in 1922

Year	Winner	Club	Runner-up	Club	ref
1920	Jack Beresford	Thames RC	Donald Gollan	First Trinity, Cm	
1921	Frits Eijken	Delft Univ, Laga, NED	Jack Beresford	Thames RC	
1922	Walter Hoover	Duluth, Minnesota, USA	Jack Beresford	Thames RC	
1923	Morris Keele Morris	London RC	Donald Gollan	Leander Club	
1924	Jack Beresford	Thames RC	Keith Neville Craig	Pembroke College, Cm	
1925	Jack Beresford	Thames RC	Donald Gollan	Leander Club	
1926	Jack Beresford	Thames RC	Geoffrey Egbert G Goddard	Jesus College, Cm	
1927	R T Lee	Worcester College, Ox	Joseph Wright Jr.	Argonaut RC, CAN	
1928	Joseph Wright Jr.	Argonaut RC, CAN	R T Lee	Worcester College, Oxford	
1929	Bert Gunther	De Amstel, NED	Joseph Wright Jr.	Argonaut RC, CAN	
1930	Jack Guest	Don Rowing Club, CAN	Gerhard Boetzelen	Berliner RC, GER	
1931	Bobby Pearce	Leander BC, Hamilton, CAN	Fred Bradley	Pembroke College, Cm	
1932	Herbert Buhtz	Berliner RC, GER	Gerhard Boetzelen	Berliner RC, GER	
1933	Tom Askwith	Peterhouse, Cm	Humphrey Warren	Trinity Hall, Cm	
1934	Herbert Buhtz	Berliner RC, GER	Winthrop Rutherford	Princeton University, USA	
1935	Ernst Rufli	FC Zurich RC, SWI	Jiří Zavřel	Veslařský Klub, CZE	
1936	Ernst Rufli	FC Zurich RC, SWI	Thomas Harold Tyler	Thames RC	
1937	Josef Hasenöhrl	RV Ellida, AUT	John Francis Coulson	Argonaut RC, CAN	
1938	Joe Burk	Penn AC, USA	Len D Habbitts	Reading RC	
1939	Joe Burk	Penn AC, USA	Roger Verey	Akademicki Zwiazek Sportowy, POL	
No races 1940–1945 (WWII)

=== 1946 to 1999 ===
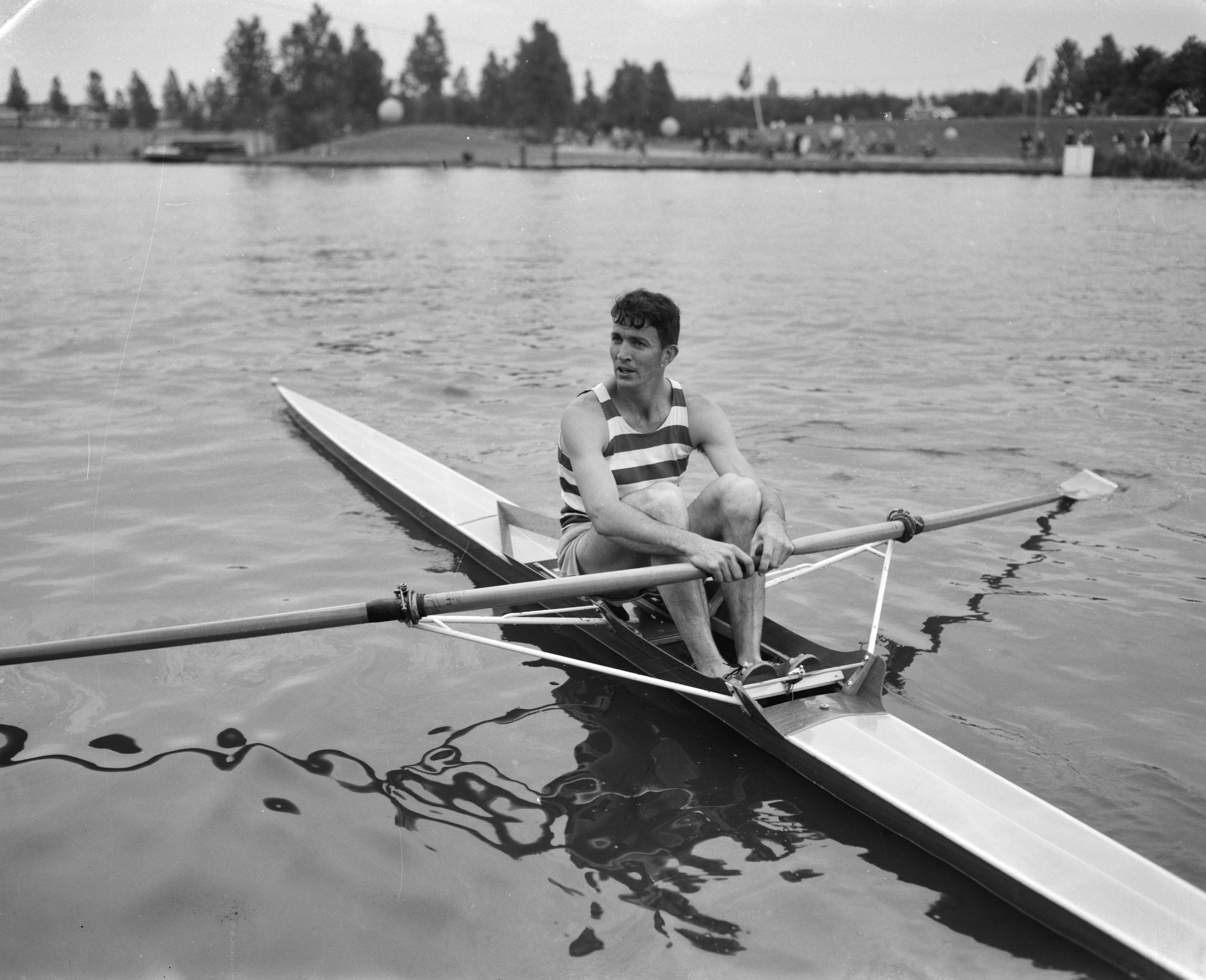
Stuart Mackenzie, six times winner from 1957 to 1962

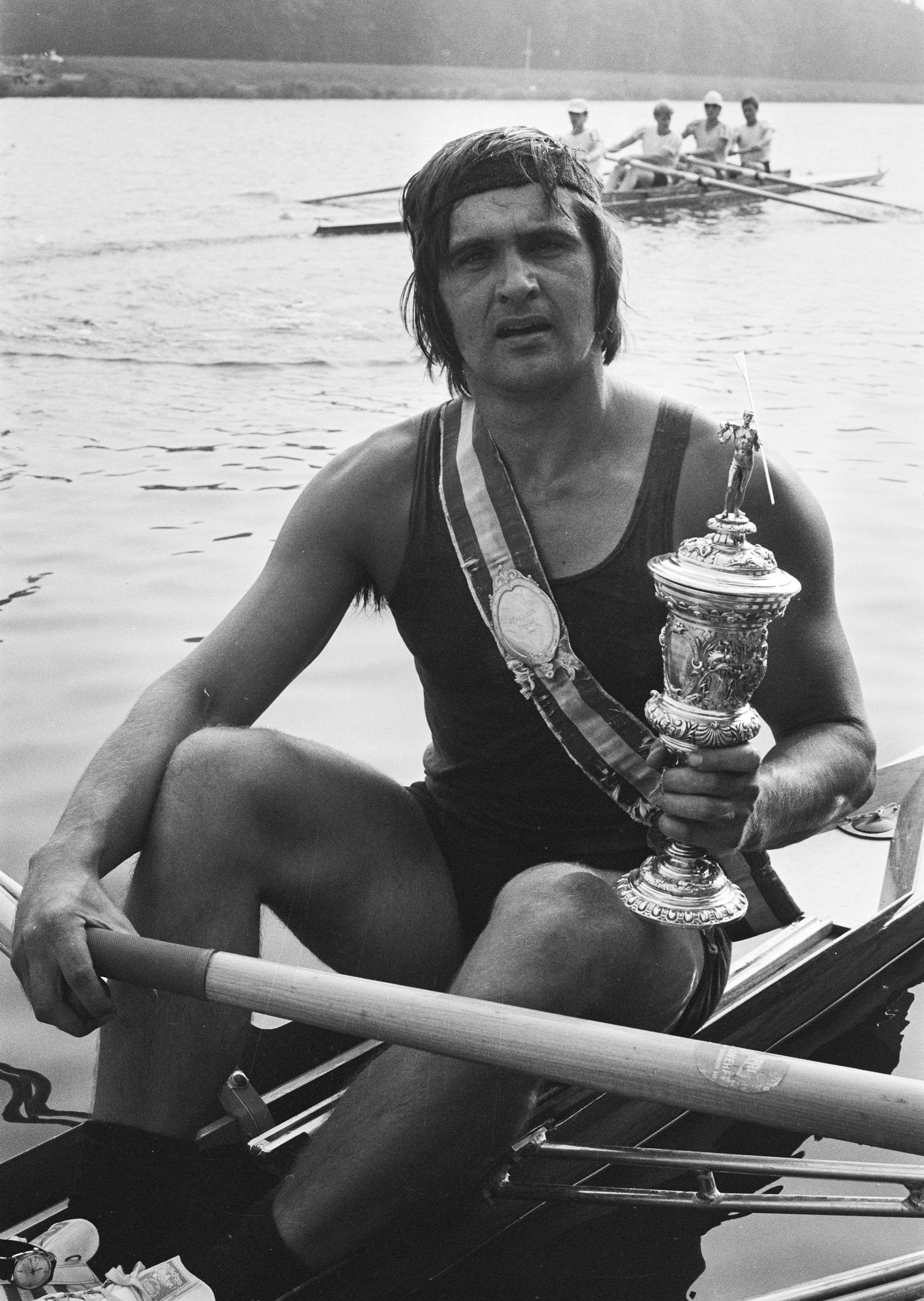
Three-time winner Seán Drea

Year	Winner	Club	Runner-up	Club	ref
1946	Jean Séphériadès	SN Basse Seine, FRA	John B. Kelly Jr.	US Navy, USA	
1947	John B. Kelly Jr.	University of Penn, USA	Carl H Fronsdal	Bergens Roklubb, NOR	
1948	Mervyn Wood	NSW Police RC, AUS	Bert Bushnell	Maidenhead RC	
1949	John B. Kelly Jr.	University of Penn, USA	Jack H Trinsey	Notre Dame Club of Phila, USA	
1950	Antony Rowe	Leander Club	Rob van Mesdag	Trinity College, Dublin	
1951	Tony Fox	Pembroke College, Cm	Erik Larsen	Koge Roklubb, DEN	
1952	Mervyn Wood	Sydney Rowing Club, AUS	Tony Fox	London Rowing Club	
1953	Tony Fox	London Rowing Club	Robert George	Union Nautique de Liege, BEL	
1954	Perica Vlašić	Mornar Club, YUG	Alain Colomb	Aviron Romand, SWI	
1955	Teodor Kocerka	AZS Bydgoszsz, POL	Sidney Rand	Royal Air Force	
1956	Teodor Kocerka	AZS Bydgoszsz, POL	Tony Fox	London Rowing Club	
1957	Stuart Mackenzie	Sydney RC, AUS	Vyacheslav Ivanov	Krasnoe Znamia, USSR	
1958	Stuart Mackenzie	Sydney RC, AUS	Vyacheslav Ivanov	Central Army Club, USSR	
1959	Stuart Mackenzie	Sydney RC, AUS	Harry Parker	Vesper BC, USA	
1960	Stuart Mackenzie	Leander Club	Teodor Kocerka	AZS Szczecin, POL	
1961	Stuart Mackenzie	Mosman RC, AUS	Oleg Tyurin	Trud Club, Leningrad	
1962	Stuart Mackenzie	Leander Club	William L. Barry	Quintin BC	
1963	Gottfried Kottmann	Belvoir RC, SWI	William L. Barry	Quintin BC	
1964	Seymour Cromwell	Nonpareil RC, USA	Alberto Demiddi	Club de Regatas Rosario, ARG	
1965	Donald Spero	NY AC, USA	Hugh Wardell-Yerburgh	Bristol RC	
1966	Achim Hill	BSGM Baumschuleneweg, GDR	Jan Wienese	Roei en Zeilverenging de Amstel	
1967	Martin Studach	Grasshopper Club Zürich, SWI	Jochen Meißner	Mannheimer Rv Amiciitia Von 1876	
1968	Hugh Wardell-Yerburgh	Eton Vikings	Kenny Dwan	Poplar, Blackwall & District RC	
1969	Joachim Böhmer	SC Dynamo Berlin, GER	William B Tytus	Seattle Tennis Club	
1970	Jochen Meißner	Mannheimer RV Amicitia, GER	Patrick Delafield	Tideway Scullers' School	
1971	Alberto Demiddi	Club de Regatas Rosario, ARG	Jim Dietz	New York AC, USA	
1972	Aleksandr Timoshinin	WMF Moscow, USSR	Seán Drea	Vesper BC, USA	
1973	Seán Drea	Neptune Rowing Club, IRE	David Sturge	Lady Margaret BC	
1974	Seán Drea	Neptune RC, IRE	Kenny Dwan	Poplar, Blackwall & District RC	
1975	Seán Drea	Neptune RC, IRE	Jim Dietz	New York AC	
1976	Ted Hale	Sydney Rowing Club, AUS	Peter Zeun	Peterborough City RC	
1977	Tim Crooks	Leander Club	Jim Dietz	New York AC	
1978	Tim Crooks	Leander Club	Hugh Matheson	Thames Tradesmen's RC	
1979	Hugh Matheson	Nottingham Rowing Club	Johan Ghoos	Antwerpse RV, BEL	
1980	Ricardo Ibarra	Mar del Plata, ARG	Rolf Thorsen	Horten Roklubb, NOR	
1981	Chris Baillieu	Leander Club	Chris Howell	University of London RC	
1982	Chris Baillieu	Leander Club	Allan Whitwell	Thames Tradesmen's RC	
1983	Steve Redgrave	Marlow Rowing Club	Tim Crooks	Kingston RC	
1984	Chris Baillieu	Leander Club	Bjarne Eltang	Danske SR, DEN	
1985	Steve Redgrave	Marlow Rowing Club	Brad Alan Lewis	Dirty Dozen RC, USA	
1986	Bjarne Eltang	Danske Stud RK, DEN	Steve Redgrave	Marlow Rowing Club	
1987	Peter-Michael Kolbe	RC Hamburg, GER	Vasil Yakusha	Soviet Army, USSR	
1988	Hamish McGlashan	Melbourne University BC	Andrew Sudduth	Harvard University, USA	
1989	Václav Chalupa	Dukla Praha, CZE	Kajetan Broniewski	AZS-AWF Warszawa, POL	
1990	Eric Verdonk	Koru RC, NZL	Wim Van Belleghem	Bruges Trimm-en, BEL	
1991	Wim Van Belleghem	Royal Club Nautique de Gand, BEL	Eric Verdonk	Koru RC, NZL	
1992	Rorie Henderson	Leander Club	Paul Reedy	Melbourne University BC	
1993	Thomas Lange	Ruderverein Bollberg-Halle, GER	Václav Chalupa	Dukla Praha, CZE	
1994	Xeno Müller	Grasshopper Club Zurich, SWI	Martin Haldbo Hansen	Denmark Rocenter	
1995	Jüri Jaanson	Parnu Rowing Club, EST	Xeno Müller	Grasshopper Club, Zurich	
1996	Merlin L. O. Vervoorn	DSR Proteus-Eretes, Delft, NED	Andy. R Bihrer	Grasshopper Club, Zurich	
1997	Greg Searle	Molesey Boat Club	Peter Haining	Auriol Kensington RC	
1998	Jamie Koven	Brown Alumni, USA	Greg Searle	Molesey Boat Club	
1999	Marcel Hacker	RC Magdeburg, GER	Jamie Koven	Riverside Boat Club, USA	

=== 2000 onwards ===
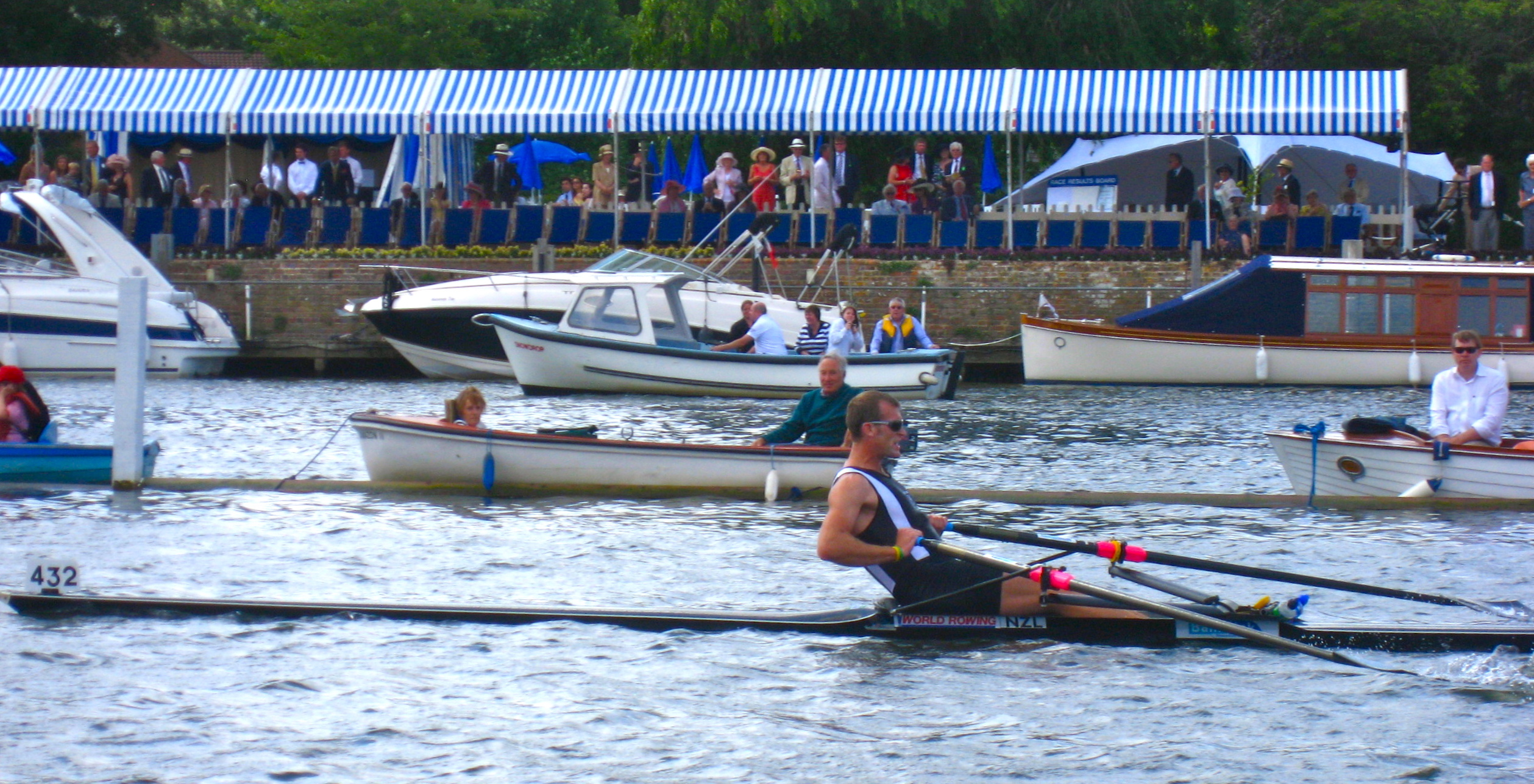
New Zealander Drysdale winning in 2009

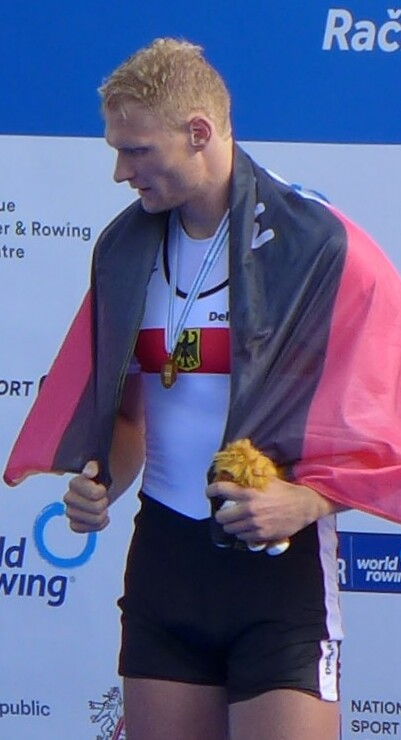
Oliver Zeidler

Year	Winner	Club	Runner-up	Club	ref
2000	Aquil Abdullah	Princeton Training Center, USA	Simon D. Goodbrand	Rob Roy Boat Club	
2001	Duncan Free	Surfers Paradise RC, AUS	Todd Hallett	Amateur AC, CAN	
2002	Pete Wells	University of London	Matt Langridge	Leander Club	
2003	Alan Campbell	Tideway Scullers School	Ben P. Hopkins	Vurtin Univ, AUS	
2004	Marcel Hacker	Casseler Fraven Ruderverein, GER	Colin Smith	Oxford University	
2005	Wyatt Allen	Princeton Training Center, USA	Charlie M. Palmer	Cantabrigian RC	
2006	Mahé Drysdale	West End RC, NZL	Charlie M. Palmer	Cambridge University	
2007	Alan Campbell	Tideway Scullers School	Mahé Drysdale	West End RC, NZL	
2008	Ian Lawson	Leander Club	Sean M Jacob	Old Collegians BC, IRE	
2009	Mahé Drysdale	West End RC, NZL	Alan Campbell	Tideway Scullers School	
2010	Mahé Drysdale	West End RC, NZL	Lassi Karonen	Brudpiga Roddklubb, SWE	
2011	Alan Campbell	Tideway Scullers School	Nick Hudson	Australian Institute of Sport	
2012	Peter Lambert	Old Edwardian BC, RSA	Graeme Thomas	Agecroft RC	
2013	Aleksandar Aleksandrov	Kur Club, Azerbaijan	Alan Campbell	Tideway Scullers School	
2014	Mahé Drysdale	West End RC, NZL	Roel Braas	Hollandia Roeiclub, NED	
2015	Mahé Drysdale	West End RC, NZL	Gabor Csepregi	Danubius Nemzeti Hajos Egylet, HUN	
2016	Hannes Obreno	Brugse Trim en RC, BEL	Mahé Drysdale	West End RC, NZL	
2017	Matthew Dunham	Waiariki RC NZL	John Graves	Craftsbury Sculling Center, USA.	
2018	Mahé Drysdale	West End RC, NZL	Kjetil Borch	Horten Roklubb, NOR	
2019	Oliver Zeidler	Donau-Ruder-Club, GER	Guillaume Krommenhoek	Hollandia Roeiclub, NED	
2020	No competition due to COVID-19 pandemic				
2021	Graeme Thomas	Agecroft Rowing Club	Sebastian Devereux	Leander Club	
2022	Oliver Zeidler	Frankfurt RS Germany 1869	David Bartholot	Rowing Australia	
2023	Oliver Zeidler	Frankfurt RS Germany 1869	Piotr Płomiński	WTW Warszawa, POL	
2024	Oliver Zeidler	Frankfurt RS Germany 1869	James Plihal	Craftsbury Green Racing Project, USA.	
2025	Melvin Twellaar	Hollandia Roeiclub	Finlay Hamill	Waikato Rowing Club	

== See also ==
- Rowing on the River Thames
