= Athol Alexander Stuart =

Athol Alexander Paul Rees Stuart (born 1881) was an English oarsman who won the Diamond Challenge Sculls at Henley, the Wingfield Sculls and the London Cup to achieve the rowing triple crown in 1909.

Stuart was the son of Montague Pelham Stuart, of Steynton, Surbiton and his wife Mary Rees. He was educated at Cheltenham College and spent two terms at Gonville and Caius College, Cambridge. He was commissioned a second lieutenant in the 6th (6th Royal Lancashire Militia) Battalion, Manchester Regiment, and served in the Second Anglo-Boer War, during which he was promoted to lieutenant on 18 July 1900. after the end of this war, he resigned this commission in February 1903.

Stuart rowed for Kingston Rowing Club and was runner up to Alexander McCulloch in the Diamond Challenge Sculls at Henley Royal Regatta in 1908. He won the Diamond Challenge Sculls in 1909 beating R Lucas. Later in 1909 he won the Wingfield Sculls, beating Wally Kinnear. Stuart also won the London Cup at the Metropolitan Regatta, winning the triple crown in the year.

Stuart served in the First World War as a captain and adjutant of the Manchester Regiment and a major in the Sherwood Foresters.

Stuart's brother Douglas Stuart was a Cambridge University and Olympic oarsman.
