= Gilbert Kennedy =

Gilbert Kennedy may refer to:

- Gilbert Kennedy, 3rd Earl of Cassilis (1515–1558), Scottish landowner, soldier, politician and judge; served as Treasurer of Scotland
- Gilbert Kennedy, 1st Lord Kennedy (1405–1489), Scottish lord
- Gilbert Kennedy, 4th Earl of Cassilis (c. 1541–1576), Scottish peer
- Gilbert Kennedy, 2nd Earl of Cassilis (died 1527), British peer
- Gilbert Kennedy (rower) (1866–1921), English rower
- Gilbert G. Kennedy (1844–1909), Scottish amateur sportsman
