= Charles Lawes-Wittewronge =

English athlete and sculptor (1843–1911)

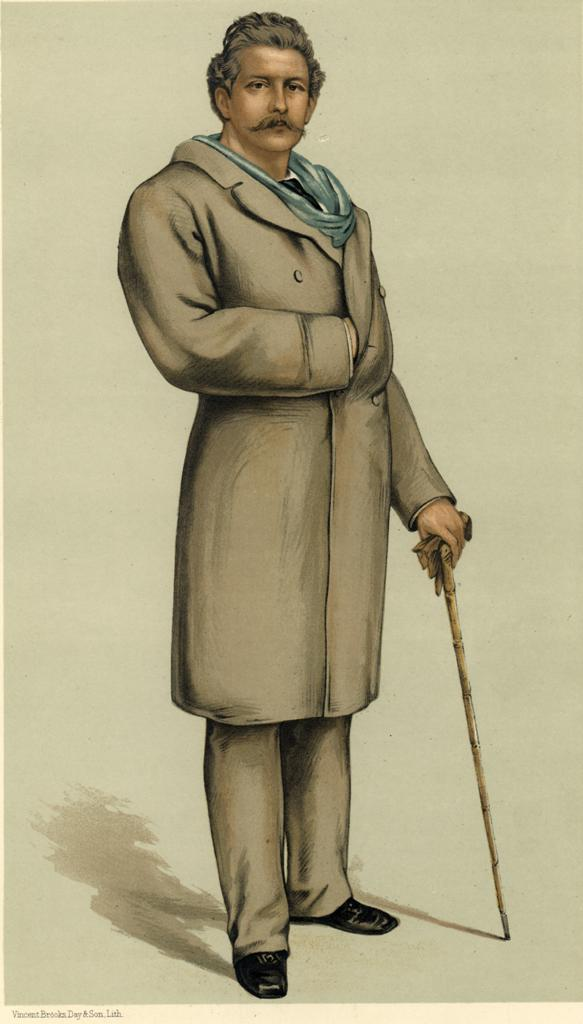
- As depicted by "VER" (François Verheyden) in Vanity Fair, 12 May 1883

Personal information
- Nationality: English
- Born: 3 October 1843 Teignmouth, Devon, England
- Died: 6 October 1911 (aged 68) London, England

Sport
- Sport: rowing

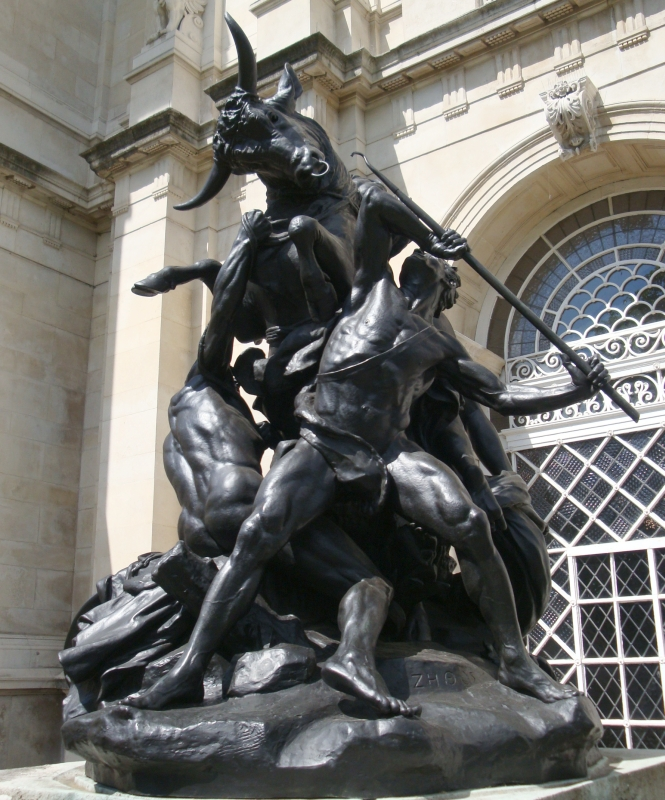
The Death of Dirce (first bronze version, 1906) on display to the left of the entrance of Tate Britain.

Sir Charles Bennet Lawes-Wittewronge, 2nd Baronet (3 October 1843 – 6 October 1911) was an English rower, athlete and sculptor. He exhibited twelve works at the Royal Academy.

== Life ==
Charles Bennet Lawes was born at Teignmouth, Devon, the only son of Sir John Lawes of Rothamsted Manor, Hertfordshire. He was educated at Eton and Trinity College, Cambridge. At Cambridge he won the Colquhoun Sculls in 1862 and won the Diamond Challenge Sculls at Henley Royal Regatta in 1863. He was a rowing Blue in 1865 when he stroked the losing Cambridge crew in the Boat Race but was in the winning crew of the Ladies' Challenge Plate at Henley. He was beaten by Edward Michell in the Diamond Challenge Sculls in 1865, but won the Wingfield Sculls beating Walter Bradford Woodgate.

Having finished second in the one mile (1.6 km) at Eton in 1859, he also enjoyed success at the university distance running events. in 1864 he won the mile at the Cambridge University sports and was awarded an athletics Blue for winning the mile at the Inter University sports. In 1866 he won the Cambridge University half mile, one-mile (1.6 km) and two-mile (3.2 km) events, and won the 1 mile at the first AAC Championships at the 1866 AAC Championships. He presented the trophy awarded annually to the winner of this event which became the Amateur Athletic Association 1 mile trophy in 1880.

Lawes decided to become a sculptor, and began his training in London under John Henry Foley RA. In 1869 he studied under Hugo Hagen in Berlin. He rented a studio in Chelsea, and in 1872, he exhibited his first work at the Royal Academy, Girl at the Stream. In 1878 he won an honourable mention at the Paris Universal Exhibition. He also exhibited his Daphne at the Royal Academy in 1880 and The Panther in 1881. Lawes also carried out work for the scientific side of the Lawes Agricultural Trust, founded by his father, and became its chairman.

In 1882 Lawes was involved in a libel case after he had imputed in the magazine Vanity Fair and elsewhere that another sculptor, Richard Claude Belt, was dishonest for taking credit for work done by someone else. The long trial, the last to be heard by the High Court of Justice in Westminster Hall, occupied the court for 43 sittings and excited much public interest at the time. The question at issue was how much a sculptor may be aided by others in work to which he attaches his name. Eventually the case was decided against Lawes, and Belt was awarded £5,000 damages.

In 1898, at age fifty-five, Lawes took up cycle racing and held the National Cycling Union amateur record for twenty-five miles, covering it in 51 minutes 15.8 seconds.

Charles Lawes succeeded his father as 2nd Baronet on 31 August 1900. In 1902 he assumed for himself and his heirs by Royal Licence the additional surname (and arms) of Wittewronge. He was one of the founders of the Royal Society of British Sculptors in 1902 and became its second president.

In 1901, Lawes helped judge the world's first major bodybuilding competition. Organized by the "Father of Bodybuilding", Eugen Sandow. The event was held in London's Royal Albert Hall, and was judged by Lawes, Sandow and Sir Arthur Conan Doyle.

In 1906 Lawes-Wittewronge executed The Death of Dirce, a bronze sculptural group based on the Farnese Bull, a classical work depicting the same subject. This was followed by a colossal marble version, exhibited at the Franco-British Exhibition in 1908, at the same time as the bronze was being exhibited at the Royal Academy. The marble is now in the grounds at Rothamsted. In 1911, after the sculptor's death at age 68, a plaster version was exhibited at the International Fine Arts Exhibition in Rome. That same year his widow offered the bronze to the National Gallery of British Art (later the Tate Gallery). Too large to be satisfactorily displayed indoors, it was installed on the terrace to the left of the building's entrance, where it still stands.

== Family ==
Charles Lawes married his first cousin Marie Amelie Rose Fountaine, known as Amy, on 8 April 1869 in St George's Church. Hanover Square, London. She was a daughter of Charles George and Rose Sarah Ravenshaw, who married on 11 April 1848 in St Marylebone, London. Sir Charles died on 6 October 1911 aged 68, following an operation for appendicitis. He was cremated at Golders Green Crematorium, Golders Green, London. A memorial to him and his wife stands there. Amy died 13 August 1928 in Westminster, London aged 79. Their only son, John, succeeded as the 3rd Baronet of Rothamsted on his father's death.

== Works ==
- The Rowers of Vanity Fair/Lawes C B - Wikibooks, collection of open-content textbooks at en.wikibooks.org

== See also ==
- List of Cambridge University Boat Race crews

== Notes ==
Baronetage of the United Kingdom
Preceded by Sir John Lawes	Baronet (of Rothamsted); 1900–1911	Succeeded by Sir John Lawes-Wittewronge
