= Frank Lumley Playford =

British rower

Frank Lumley Playford (1855–1931) was a British rower who won the Wingfield Sculls five times and the Diamond Challenge Sculls at Henley Royal Regatta in 1876.

Playford was born at Putney, the son of Francis Playford and his wife Emily Augusta Blake. His father and uncle Herbert Playford were both eminent oarsmen. He became stockbroker in his father's business.

Playford rowed for London Rowing Club and won the Wingfield Sculls in 1875 beating the previous winner A C Dicker. In 1876, he won the Diamond Challengs Sculls at Henley as well as the London Cup at the Metropolitan Regatta. He won Wingfield Sculls in 1877 beating Tom Edwards-Moss, in 1878 beating Alexander Payne and in 1879 beating Jefferson Lowndes. He did not defend his title in 1880.

Playford died at Epsom at the age of 75.

Playford married Kate Percy and was the father of Humphrey Playford.
