= Charles Lawes =

Charles Lawes may refer to:

- Charles Lawes-Wittewronge, English rower, athlete and sculptor
- Charles Lawes (cricketer), Australian cricketer
