= Stalky & Co. =

1899 novel by Rudyard Kipling

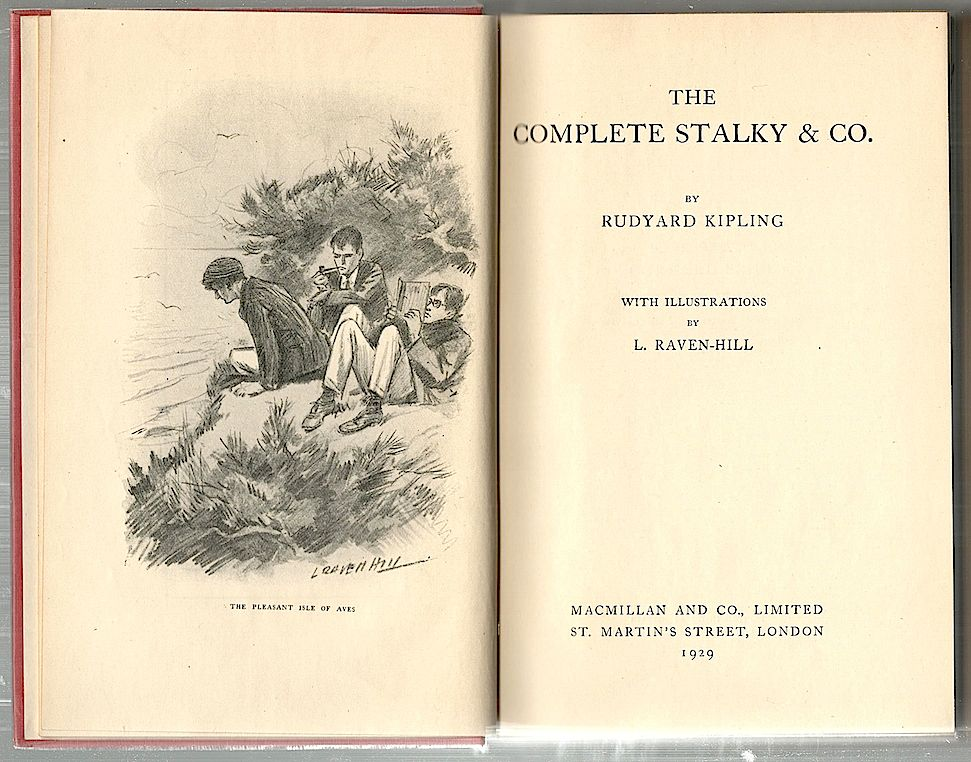
- Frontispiece and title page of first UK edition (1929) of The Complete Stalky & Co., with illustration by Leonard Raven-Hill
- Author: Rudyard Kipling
- Language: English
- Genre: School story
- Publisher: Macmillan (UK)
- Publication date: 1899
- Publication place: United Kingdom
- Media type: Print (hardcover)
- Pages: 272 pp

Stalky & Co. is a novel by Rudyard Kipling about adolescent boys at a British boarding school. It is a collection of school stories whose three juvenile protagonists display a know-it-all, cynical outlook on patriotism and authority. It was first published in 1899 after the stories had appeared in magazines during the previous two years. It is set at a school dubbed "the College" or "the Coll.", which is based on the United Services College, at Westward Ho! in North Devon, that Kipling had attended.

The stories have elements of revenge, the macabre, bullying and violence, and hints about sex, making them far from childish or idealised. For example, Beetle pokes fun at an earlier, more earnest, boys' book, Eric, or, Little by Little, thus flaunting his more worldly outlook. The final chapter recounts events in the lives of the boys when, as adults, they are in the armed forces in India. It is implied that the mischievous pranks of the boys in school were splendid training for their role as instruments of the British Empire.

George Orwell wrote in 1940 that Stalky had "had an immense influence on boys' literature".

== Characters ==
=== Boys ===
- "Stalky" (real name: Arthur Lionel Corkran). He knows that he is destined for Sandhurst, so he does not care about many academic subjects. Stalky later turns out to be brilliant in battle. He is based on Lionel Dunsterville.
- Reginald (or Reggie) Beetle, based on Kipling himself.
- William "Turkey" M'Turk (pronounced McTurk; he comes from a landed estate in Ireland). He is based on George Charles Beresford.

=== Staff ===
- Mr. Bates - the Headmaster, always wise and usually firm. Based on Cormell Price, headmaster of the United Services College.
- Mr. Prout – a housemaster in charge of Stalky's House, the victim of many of their deceptions
- Mr. King – a housemaster who sometimes bedevils the boys; "generally held to be based on W. C. Crofts," plus F. W. Haslam
- Mr. Hartopp – a housemaster, President of the Natural History Society; he seldom comes into conflict with the three boys and is more objective about them than Prout or King
- the Reverend John Gillett – the school's chaplain, who understands the three boys and has friendly chats with them
- Foxy – a "subtle red-haired school Sergeant"

== Contents with summaries ==
The novel is a compilation of nine previously published stories, with a prefatory untitled poem beginning "Let us now praise famous men" (Sirach 44:1).

Several of the stories appeared in more than one magazine before being collected in book form. The stories are listed below in the order in which they appeared in the book, along with the date and location of their magazine appearances:

- "In Ambush" (August 1898, McClure's Magazine; December 1898, Pearson's Magazine): The three boys, reading and smoking in their "bunker" (hide-out), see a gamekeeper shooting a fox, something anathema in a place where foxhunting is practised. When M'Turk tells the keeper's employer, a colonel who owns land adjoining their school, he gratefully invites them to visit his land. Later Sergeant Foxy, Mr. King, and Mr. Prout follow the boys to see what they're up to when far from the school, and Stalky leads them onto the colonel's land. The colonel upbraids them for trespassing, amusing the boys, who are eavesdropping. Though the Head finds out that the boys are technically innocent, he canes them for causing trouble.
- "Slaves of the Lamp, Part I." (April 1897, Cosmopolis: A Literary Review;): While the three boys and the three in the study (private room) below are rehearsing a pantomime of "Aladdin", Mr. King interrupts, as he has found lampoons Beetle wrote about him. He takes Beetle to his study and reprimands him in front of the younger boy who showed King the verses. By shooting a drunken carter with a catapult, Stalky induces him to throw stones at King. Beetle takes the opportunity to increase the damage that the stones do to King's study and to the tale-bearer.
- "An Unsavoury Interlude" (January 1899, McClure's Magazine and Windsor Magazine): Mr. King taunts Beetle for having formerly been afraid of bathing in the sea, leading the boys of King's house (dormitory) to taunt those of Prout's house as "stinkers". With the help of architectural knowledge Beetle has recently learned, the boys put a cat that they killed above the ceiling in King's house, causing a real stink, to King's house's much greater embarrassment.
- "The Impressionists" (February 1899, McClure's Magazine and Windsor Magazine): Mr. Prout evicts the three boys from their study because each has been doing the others' work in the classes that he is good at. They give the impression of conspiracies, intrigues, and systematic usury in the house till he sends them back to their study to get them away from the other pupils.
- "The Moral Reformers" (March 1899, McClure's Magazine and Windsor Magazine): The Rev. John Gillett suggests that the three boys protect a small boy who is being bullied. They trick the bullies (two older outsiders being prepped for their Sandhurst entrance exams) into letting themselves be tied up for a game, and in a scene that has horrified many readers, torment the bullies without mercy until they convincingly agree to behave themselves.
- "A Little Prep" (April 1899, McClure's Magazine and Windsor Magazine): The Head catches the three boys out of bounds and smoking and has them caned, and they intend revenge. Some Old Boys (former pupils) visit at the end of the term. One of them, Crandall, an army officer in India, had seen another Old Boy die after a skirmish. The Head has Crandall sleep in his old dormitory, and boys crowd in to hear his story. To punish them for leaving their beds, the Head has them do prep. (study) on the last night. The pupils riot. The three boys had learned that when the Head had happened upon them out of bounds, he had been out to save another pupil from diphtheria by sucking the pseudo-membrane out of his throat, at great risk to the Head's life. They spread the report of the Head's heroism. When he comes to stop the rioting, all the pupils cheer him incessantly despite his punishment.
- "The Flag of Their Country" (May 1899, McClure's Magazine; July 1899, Pearson's Magazine): A general on the College's Board of Council sees Sergeant Foxy drilling boys, including Stalky and Beetle, as a punishment for lateness. He thinks they're drilling voluntarily and decides the school should have a well-equipped cadet corps. A number of boys participate enthusiastically to prepare for their intended careers as military officers. However, a Member of Parliament is invited to give a speech on 'patriotism' to the school. He tactlessly outrages the boys' deep and private feelings about their military families and future, culminating by waving a Union Jack, an action which baffles them. Led by Stalky, the members of the cadet corps quit the next morning.
- "The Last Term" (May 1899, Windsor Magazine): The three boys enjoy flirting with and kissing a local young woman, Mary Yeo. When a shy and intellectual prefect named Tulke sees them, they persuade Mary to kiss him. The prefects try to criticise the three for immorality, but they turn the tables by reporting Tulke's "immorality" and suggesting that the other prefects are conspiring with him. The three boys grudgingly agree not to tell the rest of the school, but do so on the last day, when they're leaving but the prefects will be back.
- "Slaves of the Lamp, Part II." (May 1897, Cosmopolis: A Literary Review): The characters are now about thirty, and most are civil servants or soldiers in India. All the participants in the Aladdin pantomime except Stalky reunite in England at the estate of a friend ("the Infant", who narrated Kipling's story "A Conference of the Powers"). They tell Beetle (the narrator of this story) how Stalky, an army captain, got his small force out of a siege by shooting at his enemies to get them to fight each other, as he had got the carter to throw stones at Mr. King; meanwhile Stalky used his charisma and language skills to keep his Sikh and Pathan allies together and then to set himself up as almost a local ruler.

=== Other stories ===
An expanded version of Stalky & Co. called The Complete Stalky and Co. was published in 1929. It contains all of the stories in the 1899 book plus five more, most of which had appeared in magazines in the 1920s. They appear in the following order:

- "Stalky" (originally published 1898, collected in Land and Sea Tales for Scouts and Guides in 1923). Several pupils at the Coll. are caught and locked in a barn while trying to steal cattle for fun. Corkran leads Beetle and M'Turk in rescuing them and locking the farmhands in the barn. The boys change Corkran's nickname "Corky" to "Stalky" (which rhymes with it in the non-rhotic accents of England, and is based on their slang "to stalk", meaning "to use clever tactics, to outwit others"). Kipling describes "Stalky" as the first of the Stalky & Co tales to be written: it was originally published in The Windsor Magazine and McClure's Magazine in 1898.
- "In Ambush"
- "Slaves of the Lamp (Part I)"
- "An Unsavoury Interlude"
- "The Impressionists"
- "The Moral Reformers"
- "The United Idolaters" (1924, collected in Debits and Credits in 1926): A school fad for the Uncle Remus stories leads to wilder and wilder behaviour until a climactic fight between King's house, with a terrapin painted in their colours, and Prout's house, with a tar baby improvised by Stalky, Beetle, and M'Turk. As the school is nearly set on fire, the Head punishes many pupils. A new master obsessed with the possibility of homosexuality at the school thinks the tar baby was indecent, and the resulting quarrel with the other masters ends with his resignation.
- "Regulus" (1917, collected in A Diversity of Creatures in 1917): In Latin class, Mr. King speaks enthusiastically about Horace's Ode III.5, which tells how the general Regulus took a message of war to Carthage though he knew that the Carthaginians would kill him. A normally serious boy releases a mouse in a class. Teased by other boys about his forthcoming punishment, he goes berserk (Beetle's diagnosis) and fights one of them viciously. He accepts his punishments without trying to delay or diminish them, so Stalky compares him to Regulus—giving King ammunition in arguing to the science teacher Hartopp that the pupils learn valuable things from Latin.
- "A Little Prep."
- "The Flag of Their Country"
- "The Propagation of Knowledge" (1926, collected in Debits and Credits): In King's class, Beetle guides M'Turk in bringing up the theory that Francis Bacon wrote the plays ascribed to Shakespeare, which distracts King, as he loathes it. An examiner for the Army comes to the school. After Beetle and M'Turk elicit hints that he supports the Baconian theory, various boys pretend interest in it, getting high marks. King endures the examiner's praise of his pupils.
- "The Satisfaction of a Gentleman" (1920): Beetle and one of the "Aladdin" players have a war of pranks. They conclude with a duel that turns into a chaotic battle on the nearby golf course using guns loaded with dust shot (very small shotgun pellets). As Beetle flees, he collides with an elderly golfer who turns out to be on the school's Council. The Head canes Beetle, Stalky, and M'Turk to appease him.
- "The Last Term"
- "Slaves of the Lamp (Part II)"

Other Stalky stories:

- "A Deal in Cotton": Stalky only listens to and comments on the main character's narration. Collected in Actions and Reactions.
- "The Honours of War" (1917 in A Diversity of Creatures): Stalky (now a lieutenant-colonel) and Beetle learn that two subalterns are in trouble for playing pranks on a fellow subaltern named Wontner, including abducting him to the Infant's mansion. As Wontner intends to create a scandal that will end their careers, Stalky diverts him by helping to tie up and embarrass the pranksters, after which Wontner is as guilty as they are.

== Criticism ==
When the stories were published, some critics praised them, including most of those in the daily papers. The Athenaeum, for example, emphasised the stories' humour and realism. On the other hand, many reviews were harsh, notably Robert Buchanan's essay on Kipling in The Contemporary Review, in which Buchanan saw Kipling's work as a sign of British culture's reversion to barbarism, and said of the book, "The vulgarity, the brutality, the savagery reeks on every page."

Henry James called the book "deplorable"; Somerset Maugham, "odious". Theodore Roosevelt said it was "a story which ought never to have been written, for there is hardly a single form of meanness which it does not seem to extol, or of school mismanagement which it does not seem to applaud." Other harsh criticisms have come from George Sampson in The Concise Cambridge History of English Literature, A. C. Benson, and Edmund Wilson. H. G. Wells called Stalky and his friends "mucky little sadists". In his Outline of History, noting that a master incites the three boys to bully the two bullies with "gusto" (shared by the author) and that the Head seems to approve it, he saw authority and supposed morality as the typical justification for cruelty. He added, "In this we have the key to the ugliest, most retrogressive, and finally fatal idea of modern imperialism; the idea of a tacit conspiracy between the law and illegal violence." [Italics in original.] He compared the boys' actions to the Black Hundreds' massacres in tsarist Russia, the Jameson Raid, and "the adventures of Sir Edward Carson and F. E. Smith (now Lord Birkenhead) in Ireland". On the other hand, Richard Le Gallienne called it "perhaps the best school story ever written" and replied to its detractors by quoting the story "An Unsavoury Interlude": "It's not brutality... It's boy; only boy."

== Language and allusions ==
The stories contain a good deal of language, from slang and Devon dialect to legal Latin, that is unfamiliar to modern readers, especially those outside Britain. Also Kipling portrays the boys as being widely read in the literature available to them. Their casual talk includes Latin and French (often distorted), not unusual for schoolboys of the time, and they quote or purposefully misquote classical authors such as Cicero and Horace. At least two editions have provided notes to help modern readers understand these words and references. Allusions include:

- The Boy's Own Paper
- Eric, or, Little by Little (referred to often in mockery) Example: "Wasn't it glorious? Didn't I Eric 'em splendidly?" (Stalky: Ch. 8, "The Last Term")
- Fors Clavigera, by John Ruskin
- "The Gold-Bug", by Edgar Allan Poe
- Jabberwocky, by Lewis Carroll. M'Turk uses the word "frabjous" on two occasions, one of them in a direct quotation, and Stalky uses it once.
- A Jorrocks novel, probably Handley Cross (1843), by R. S. Surtees. Stalky quotes the line, "Hellish dark and smells of cheese." (Stalky: Ch. 8, "The Last Term")
- Julius Caesar, by William Shakespeare. When Beetle points out Tulke's embarrassing admission that he couldn't stop a girl from kissing him, Stalky adds, "And Tulkus [...] is an honourable man."
- The Last of the Mohicans, by James Fenimore Cooper. In the story "In Ambush", Beetle twice calls Sgt. Foxy "Chingachgook".
- Oliver Twist, by Charles Dickens (an allusion to Fagin)
- Uncle Remus and His Legends of the Old Plantation, by Joel Chandler Harris, London edition, 1881. The principal basis for "The United Idolaters."
- The Railway Children, by E. Nesbit

== Posthumously published manuscript ==
Kipling wrote an additional story about Stalky and Co., "Scylla and Charybdis", that remained unpublished in his lifetime. It depicts Stalky and his friends catching a colonel cheating at golf near Appledore in North Devon. The story existed only in manuscript form, attached to the end of the original manuscript of Stalky & Co.: it may have been planned as the opening chapter. On his death in 1936 Kipling bequeathed the manuscript to the Imperial Service Trust, the body that administered the Imperial Service College (successor institution to the United Services College). That school merged with Haileybury in 1942 to form Haileybury and Imperial Service College. The manuscript was displayed at Haileybury in 1962, in an exhibition to mark the school's centenary; and in 1989, after spending many years in a bank vault, was transferred to the College archives.

While "Scylla and Charybdis" was known to exist, it had never been transcribed or widely discussed. It was "discovered" in 2004 by Jeremy Lewins, a former Kipling Fellow at Magdalene College, Cambridge. The school subsequently decided to publish it, in association with the Kipling Society.

== Television adaptation ==
The tales were adapted for television by the BBC in 1982. The six-part series starred Robert Addie as Stalky and David Parfitt as Beetle. It was directed by Rodney Bennett and produced by Barry Letts.
