= Alfred Dicker =

English clergyman and rower

Alfred Cecil Dicker (12 March 1852 – 8 December 1938) was an English clergyman and rower who won the Diamond Challenge Sculls at Henley Royal Regatta three times and the Wingfield Sculls twice.

Dicker was born at St John's Wood, London, the son of John Campbell Dicker. He was educated at Winchester College and entered St John's College, Cambridge in 1871, migrating to Downing College, Cambridge in 1877 and gaining his BA in 1879. He kept up rowing throughout his time at Cambridge, rowing for Lady Margaret Boat Club. He challenged for the Wingfield Sculls in 1872. In 1873 he won the Diamond Challenge Sculls at Henley. He also won the Wingfield Sculls beating the previous champion Clement Courtenay Knollys and the Colquhoun Sculls at Cambridge University. In 1874, he won both the Diamond Challenge Sculls and the Wingfirld Sculls again. In 1875, he won the Diamond Challenge Sculls again, but lost the Wingfield Sculls to Frank Lumley Playford. Dicker remained at Cambridge to study for Holy Orders and took part in the 1876 Boat Race. His style was described "rows fairly hard, but in a very ugly humped-up form and with little swing." His elder brother Gerard Dicker had been in the crew the previous year.

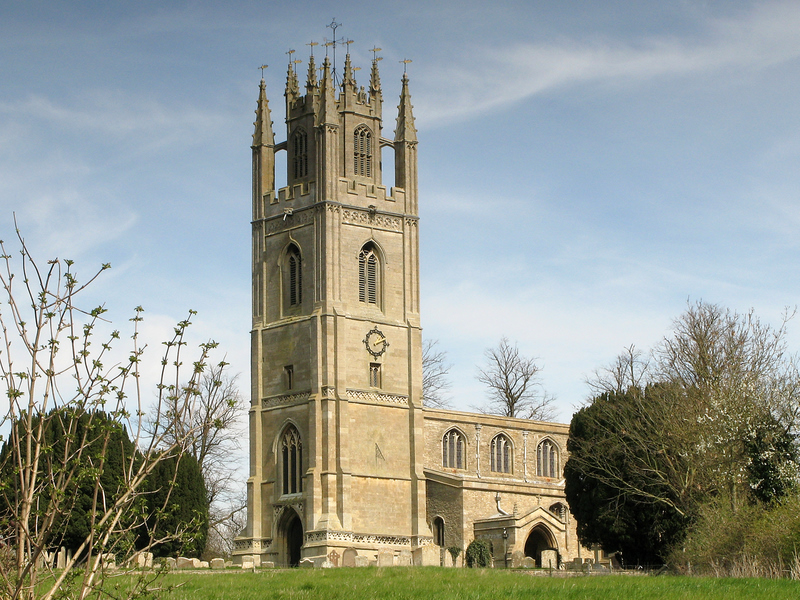
St Peter's Church, Lowick

Dicker was ordained deacon in 1879 and priest in 1880. He became curate of St Mary's Kilburn in 1879 and in 1881 became vicar of All Saints' Church, Newchurch where he instigated a restoration of the church in 1883. In 1893 he became rector of St Maurice's with St Mary's Kalendar and St Peter's Colebrooke, Winchester. In 1904 this also included St Lawrence Church, Winchester and he remained in Winchester until 1906 when he moved to become rector of St Peter's Church, Lowick with Slipton, Northamptonshire. He retired in 1925 and lived at Boar's Hill, Oxford.

Dicker died at the age of 86 and was buried at Wootton.

Dicker married novelist Constance Ellen MacEwen at Portsea in 1885.
