= Tom Edwards-Moss =

British amateur oarsman & politician (1855–1893)

Tom Cottingham Edwards-Moss, (7 April 1855 – 16 December 1893), was a British amateur oarsman who rowed in the Boat Race four times and twice won the Diamond Challenge Sculls, and a Conservative politician who sat in the House of Commons from 1885 to 1892.

Edwards-Moss was the second son of Sir Thomas Edwards-Moss, Baronet of Otterspool, Aigburth, near Liverpool and Amy Charlotte Edwards. His grandfather was John Moss, founder of what later became the North-Western Bank, and his father had assumed the surname Edwards-Moss on marriage. He was educated at Eton College and Brasenose College, Oxford, graduating in 1878.

An outstanding oarsman, Edwards-Moss rowed for the Oxford crew in the University Boat Races for four years. He was in the winning crew of 1875 and the losing crew of 1876. The 1877 race was the only dead-heat in the Boat Race's history. He won the Diamond Challenge Sculls at the Henley Royal Regatta beating A. V Frere in 1877, but came second in the Wingfield Sculls later in the year to Frank Lumley Playford. He was president of OUBC and in the winning crew again in 1878. In the last two years he shared the Oxford boat with Lord Desborough. Also in 1878 at Henley, he beat Jefferson Lowndes in the Diamond Challenge cup and also won Silver Goblets partnering W Ellison. He was President of Vincent's Club in 1877.

Edwards-Moss was a lieutenant in the Lancashire Hussars Yeoman Cavalry. In July 1885, he was appointed assistant private secretary to the Home Secretary, R A Cross. He was elected as Conservative Member of Parliament for Widnes at the general election in November of the same year, and retained his seat until 1892, when he retired due to ill health.

Tom Edwards-Moss died at age 38 from influenza and typhoid fever.

== See also ==
- List of Oxford University Boat Race crews

Parliament of the United Kingdom
New constituency before: South West Lancashire	Member of Parliament for Widnes; 1885–1892	Succeeded by John Saunders Gilliat
