= Peter Wells (rower) =

British rower

Personal information
- Born: 27 May 1982 (age 44) Hexham, England

Sport
- Sport: Rowing
- Event: single/quad sculls
- Club: Univ of London BC

Peter Wells (born 27 May 1982) is a British rower who competed in the 2004 Summer Olympics.

In 2002, he won the Diamond Challenge Sculls (the premier event for single sculls) at the Henley Royal Regatta rowing for the University of London Boat Club.

In 2026, he returned to the racing scene in sunny Jersey at their annual offshore regatta which forms part of the Four nations series. Teaming up with colleague Kirsten Melin, the pair entered the Mix Masters beach sprint event, taking the bronze in a hard fought B final race.
