= Jefferson Lowndes =

English rower

Jefferson Lowndes (1858–1893) was an English rower. He won the Diamond Challenge Sculls at Henley Royal Regatta five times and won the Wingfield Sculls twice.

== Early life ==
Lowndes was born at Oxford with only one eye. In 1878 and 1879, he studied at Hertford College, Oxford.

== Rower ==
While at Oxford he won the University Sculls. In 1879, he won the Diamond Challenge Sculls at Henley for the first time, beating Frank Lumley Playford. Playford then beat Lowndes in the Wingfield Sculls that year. Lowndes then became a schoolmaster at Derby School and rowed for the Derby School Rowing Club. In 1880 and 1881, he won the Diamond Challenge Sculls again. In 1881, he won the Wingfield Sculls and the London Cup at the Metropolitan Regatta to achieve the "Triple Crown". In 1882, he won the Diamond Challenge sculls again. In 1883, he was rowing for the Twickenham Rowing Club and won the Diamond Challenge Sculls for the fifth time, the Wingfield Sculls for the second time, and the London Cup at the Metropolitan Regatta again for his second triple crown. In 1884, he won Silver Goblets at Henley with D E Brown.

Lowndes died at Liverpool at the age of 35. The cause of death was determined to be 'suicide whilst temporarily insane', having shot himself in the North Western Hotel.

== Notes ==
Derby Town Rowing Club founded in 1879, claimed no wins until 1904. Lowndes was a Master at Derby School and raced for them at Derby Regatta. Derby School Rowing Club was affiliated to Derwent Rowing Club (founded 1857), and Lowndes appears in the books of account of this club. No record describes him racing for either club at regattas. He entered Henley Royal Regatta as "Derby" i.e. from the Town. Not until the 20th century did Derby Town RC, change its name to Derby Rowing Club.
