= Gilbert Kennedy (rower) =

English rower who won the Wingfield Sculls in 1893

Gilbert Edward B Kennedy (1866–1921) was an English rower who won the Wingfield Sculls, the amateur single sculling championship of the River Thames, in 1893.

Kennedy was born at Kingston upon Thames. He joined Kingston Rowing Club and competed in the Diamond Challenge Sculls at Henley Royal Regatta between 1890 and 1893. In 1890 and 1893 he was runner-up to Guy Nickalls. Kennedy competed in the Wingfield Sculls in 1892, when he was runner-up to Vivian Nickalls. However he turned the tables in 1893 and beat V Nickalls

In 1910 Kennedy purchased Hascombe Court at Hascombe and developed the parkland over the years until his death there at the age 55.
