= Edwin Brickwood =

British rower

Edwin Dampier Brickwood (1 December 1837 – 1906) was a British rower who won the Wingfield Sculls in 1861 and the Diamond Challenge Sculls at Henley Royal Regatta in 1859 and 1862. He also wrote about rowing.

Brickwood was born in Luton, Bedfordshire, the son of Edwin Latham Brickwood and his wife Elizabeth Ann Dampier. He became a civil servant. Brickwood rowed for London Rowing Club and in 1859 won the Diamond Challenge Sculls at Henley. In 1861 Brickwood won the Wingfield Sculls, and in 1862, the Diamond Challenge Sculls again. He lost the Wingfield Sculls in 1862 to W. B. Woodgate.

Brickwood was aquatic correspondent for The Field magazine and in 1866 published, under the name "Argonaut", The Arts of Rowing and Training. For many years he produced the Rowing Almanack and Oarsman's Companion. His definition of the difference between amateurs and professionals became the standard.

Brickwood contributed the article "Yachting" to the 9th edition of the Encyclopædia Britannica.

Brickwood died at the age of 68.
