= United Services College =

Defunct public school in England

Coordinates: 51.0388°N 4.2341°W

Information
- School type: Public school
- Established: 1874
- Closed: 1906; Merged with St. Mark's School
- Gender: Boys

The United Services College was an English boys' public school for the sons of military officers and civil servants, located from 1874 at Westward Ho! near Bideford in North Devon, from 1904 at Harpenden, Hertfordshire, and finally at Windsor, Berkshire. Almost all boys were boarders. The school was founded to prepare pupils for a career as officers in the armed services, many of them going on to the Royal Military College, Sandhurst, Military College, Woolwich or the Royal Naval College, Dartmouth.

== History ==
The college was founded in 1874. Its first headmaster, Cormell Price, took twelve boys with him to the new school from Haileybury College, where he had been a housemaster.

For its home, the school occupied a terrace of twelve substantial villas, recently built, which still survive under the name of Kipling Terrace. In his book Schooldays with Kipling (1936), George Beresford noted that, as the villas and hotels of Westward Ho! were not a thriving township, it was easy for the school to lease "ample acreage for football and cricket fields".

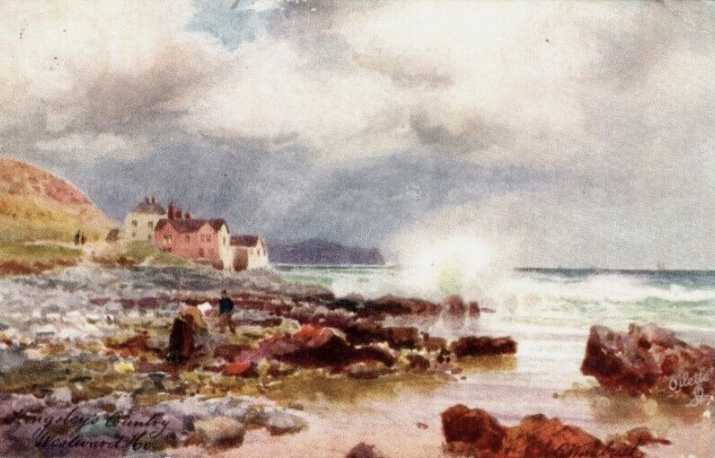
Westward Ho! by H. B. Wimbush, c. 1905

Rudyard Kipling was a boy at the school from 1878 to 1882, and his book Stalky & Co. (1899), set in a school referred to as "the Coll.", was based on his years at the United Services College.

Cormell Price retired as headmaster in 1894, and this event was marked by a speech by Kipling, already the most notable former pupil, on 25 July 1894. The speech was later printed in Kipling's College (1929).

The College suffered financial difficulties in 1903, and after rumours about its future had circulated, came newspaper reports in July of that year that "The United Services College. Westward Ho! ... is to be merged in an Imperial Service College, which is to be built." It was still at Westward Ho! under the headmastership of the Rev. F. W. Tracy, M.A., in February 1904, but in April 1904, the Senior Division of the school was re-opened at Harpenden, in Hertfordshire, and the Junior Division at Bognor, Sussex. At Harpenden, the school took over the empty buildings of St George's School. Only temporary arrangements were made at first, while the Imperial Service College Trust raised funds. It did not stay there long, as it could not come to terms with its new landlord.

Between 20 and 22 June 1904, a public auction of the school's furniture and equipment at Westward Ho! took place. The school remained divided between Harpenden and Bognor in 1905. In April 1906, there was an announcement that the Senior Division, still under F. W. Tracy, was to move to Onslow Hall, Richmond Green, on 4 May. In the event, it stayed there only for the Summer term.

The school next merged with St Mark's School, Windsor, later in 1906, but it continued to use the name "United Services College, Windsor" until 1911. It was then renamed as "Imperial Service College", and this was merged with Haileybury College in 1942.

As at virtually all boys' schools of its era, corporal punishment (strokes of the cane) was used, but USC was very unusual in that the cane was applied to the student's upper back (as described by Kipling) rather than the buttocks.

== Notable former pupils ==
- Rudyard Kipling (1865–1936), writer. His collection of stories, Stalky & Co, is based on his experiences at the College, which he joined in January 1878 and left in the summer of 1882. He dedicated the book to Cormell Price, headmaster of the school for its first twenty years, and Price is portrayed in it as someone the boys respected.
- Major-General Lionel Dunsterville CB, CSI (1865–1946), a contemporary of Kipling, and the inspiration for the character of Stalky in the Stalky & Co. stories
- George Charles Beresford (1864–1938), photographer, inspiration for "M'Turk" in Stalky & Co.
- Bruce Bairnsfather (1887–1959), cartoonist and author
- Colonel Edward Douglas Browne-Synge-Hutchinson, VC, CB (attended United Services College Day Boy 1875). He was a Major when he earned his VC.
- Brigadier General George William St. George Grogan, VC, CB, CMG, DSO & Bar (attended 1890–1893)
- Brigadier General The Honourable Alexander Gore Arkwright Hore-Ruthven, VC, GCMG, CB, DSO & Bar, PC, Croix de Guerre (France and Belgium). He was a Captain when he earned his VC.
- Brigadier General Francis Aylmer Maxwell, VC, CSI, DSO & Bar, (attended 1883–1890)
- Captain Anketell Moutray Read, VC, (attended 1898–1902)
- Major General Cyril Wagstaff, Commandant of the Royal Military Academy, Woolwich.
- Archibald Ritchie (1869–1955), British Army Major-General of World War I
- Colonel Bernard Underwood Nicolay (attended 1887–1892)
