= Thomas Bone =

English rower

Thomas Robson Bone (1815–1882) was an English rower who won the Diamond Challenge Sculls at Henley Royal Regatta in 1849 and 1850 and who also won the Wingfield Sculls in 1850 and 1851.

In 1849 Bone, rowing for "London", won the Diamond Challenge Sculls at Henley, but lost in the Wingfield Sculls to Francis Playford. In 1850 for Thames Club he won the Diamond Challenge Sculls again. That year, he was asked to enter an event at Bath regatta in order to make a race of it. However, because there was a £10 prize attached to it, he was criticised by the Wingfield Sculls committee. For this reason, Playford objected to racing Bone in the Wingfield Sculls so Bone, representing Meteor Club, won on a row-over. He rowed over again in 1851 for Thames Club but resigned in 1852 because he could not find a backer.

Bone died at Fulham aged 67.

Bone married at St James Westminster in 1850.
