= Francis Playford =

British rower

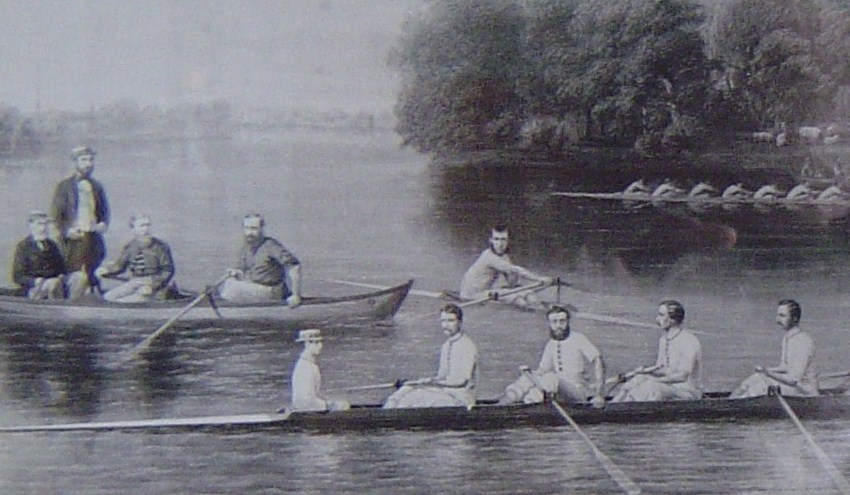
- Playford is standing in the boat on the left. His brother Herbert Playford is stroking the eight in the foreground

Personal information
- Nationality: British
- Born: c. 1825
- Died: 1 January 1896
- Occupation: Rower

Francis Playford (c. 1825 – 1 January 1896) was a British rower who won the Wingfield Sculls in 1849 and the pairs oars at Henley Royal Regatta.

== Early life ==
Playford was born at South Lambeth, London and was part of a rowing family which included his brother Herbert Playford. He was a stockbroker in the City of London. He was a member of Thames Club and won the gold challenge cup at Putney regatta in 1846 and 1847. In 1849 with E G Peacock he won the Silver Wherries at Henley. In 1849 he also won the Wingfield Sculls, beating Thomas Bone by half a length. He was first captain of London Rowing Club after its foundation in 1856.

== Works ==
Playford wrote about investment in his book Practical Hints for investing Money: with an explanation of the mode of transacting business on the Stock Exchange published in 1855.

Playford died at the age of 71. Playford married in 1851 and his son Frank Lumley Playford was also a rower.
