= Edward Michell =

English barrister and rower (1843-1926)

Edward Blair Michell (1843–1926) was an English barrister and rower who won the Wingfield Sculls in 1866 and the Diamond Challenge Sculls at Henley Royal Regatta in 1866 and 1867. He was also a boxer, a linguist, an authority on falconry and the author of books on a variety of subjects.

== Life ==
Michell was born at Oxford, the son of Richard Michell principal of Hertford College, Oxford, and his wife Amelia Blair. He was at Magdalen College, Oxford, and was a strong rower and boxer. His sister was Mary Caroline Mitchell who was involved in a society scandal following her second marriage in 1889.

In 1865 he entered the Diamond Challenge Sculls at Henley but was beaten by W B Woodgate. However he won against Woodgate in 1866 and 1867. He also won the Wingfield Sculls against Woodgate in 1866, but did not compete in 1867 because of sciatica. In 1868 he capsized in the Wingfield Sculls, and earned criticism for racing without a shirt. Michell was also champion of the Clyde, Severn, Ouse and Wye. He was a champion heavy, middle and lightweight boxer.

Michell became a barrister. He was also a French avocat and highly fluent in French. He managed to get into Paris after the German armistice in 1871 and was in Paris during the time of the Paris Commune. He published a view of life under the commune in Fraser's Magazine, noting that although he and a colleague had not been very well treated by the Communist authorities they agreed that never in their time, and they both knew Paris well, had that city been so admirably managed in every way as under the rule of the Commune. Michell was later legal adviser to Chulalongkorn, King Rama V of Siam and fluent in Siamese wrote a Siamese-English dictionary. Michell was expert on hawking and was considered possibly the greatest authority on merlins. He wrote on the art and practice of hawking. Michell is also said to have purchased Wimbledon for the All England Lawn Tennis and Croquet Club.

== Publications ==
- The Practice and Procedure in Appeals from India to the Privy Council (with R B Michell) (1876)
- The Badminton Library: Fencing, Boxing, Wrestling - with F. C. Grove (1890)
- A Siamese-English Dictionary (1892)
- The Art and Practice of Hawking (1900)
