= Herbert Playford =

British rower

Herbert Harlee Playford (1831 – 1 January 1883) was a British rower who won the Wingfield Sculls and the Diamond Challenge Sculls at Henley Royal Regatta. He was instrumental in founding London Rowing Club and the Metropolitan Regatta.

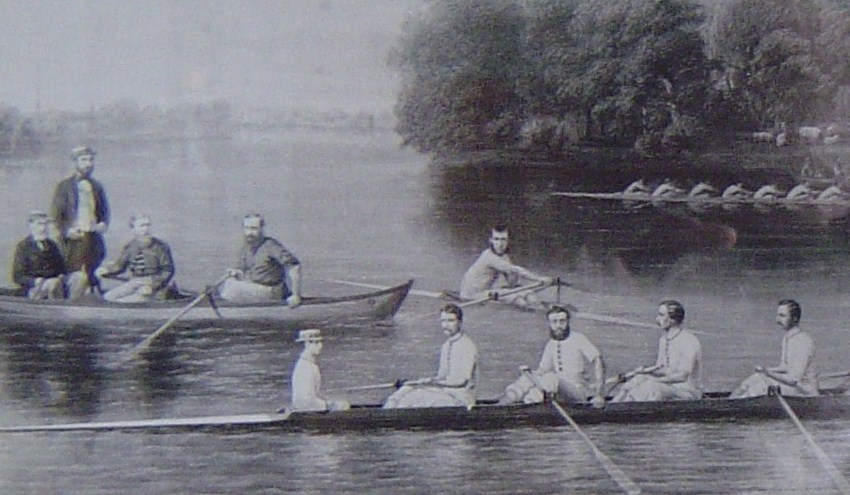
Playford is stroking the eight in the foreground with Potter, Paine and Nottidge in the seats behind him. His brother Francis Playford is standing in the boat on the left.

Playford was born in Chingford, Essex, and was part of a rowing family which included his brother Francis Playford. He was in business in the City of London as a timber merchant. He won the Diamond Challenge Sculls in 1854 and later that year won the Wingfield Sculls with a row-over. In 1855 he lost both the Diamond Challenge Sculls and the Wingfield Sculls to A. A. Casamajor who was to be the major force in rowing for the next six years. In 1856 Playford was instrumental, with Casamajor and Josias Nottidge, in founding the London Rowing Club. and stroked the club's winning crew in the Grand Challenge Cup at Henley in 1857. In 1859 he fainted when competing in the Diamond Challenge Sculls but won them again in 1860, beating E D Brickwood after Casamajor stood aside.

Playford was captain of London Rowing Club and was also responsible for helping to establish the Metropolitan Regatta, in 1866.

Playford died at the age of 52.

Playford married Louisa Mary Blake in 1856 and had sons Herbert and Louis. Louisa died in 1866 and Playford married again to Selina Boydell in 1873. They lived at Radnor House Malden, Surrey.
