= Walter Bradford Woodgate =

British barrister and oarsman

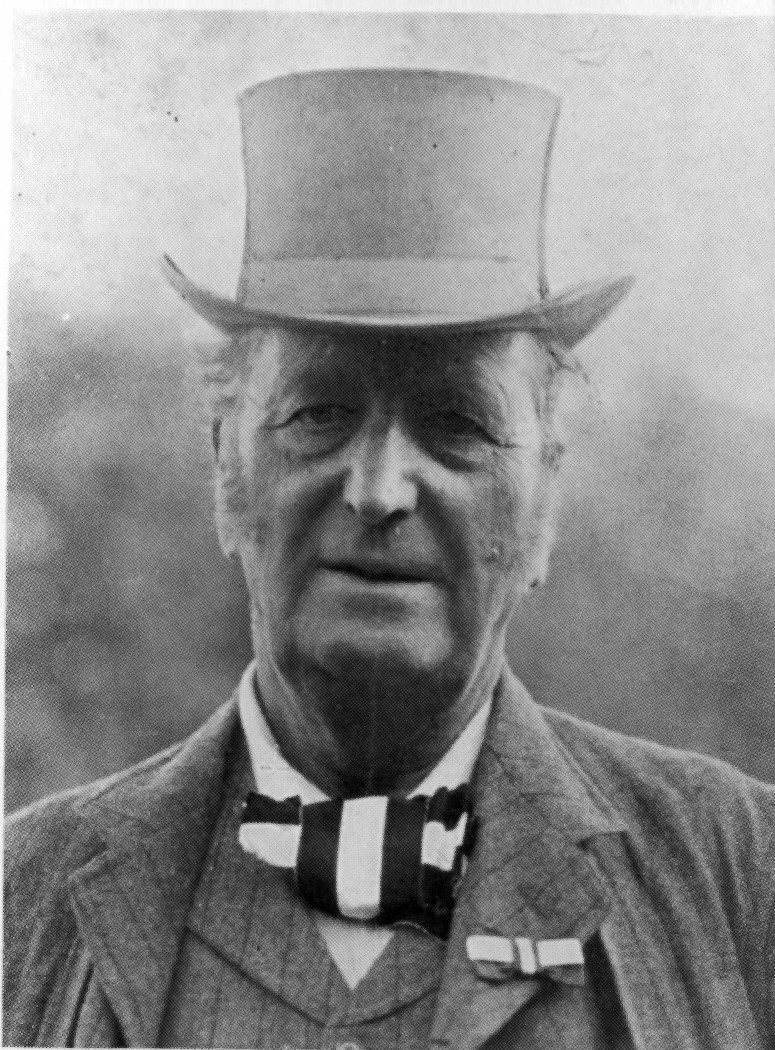
W. B. Woodgate, The Rowing Almanack, 1921

Walter Bradford Woodgate (20 September 1841 – 1 November 1920) was a British barrister and oarsman who won the Wingfield Sculls three times, and various events at Henley Royal Regatta including the Silver Goblets five times and the Diamond Challenge Sculls once. He founded Vincent's Club as an undergraduate at Brasenose College, Oxford, in 1863, and in 1868 created the first coxless four by persuading Brasenose's cox to jump overboard after the start of Henley's Stewards' Challenge Cup.

== Biography ==
Woodgate was born at Belbroughton, Worcestershire, England, the eldest son of Canon Henry Arthur Woodgate, who was a fellow of St John's College, Oxford, and elder brother of Major General Edward Woodgate who was killed at Spion Kop. Woodgate was educated at Radley College before going up to Brasenose College, Oxford, in 1858, where he rowed for Brasenose College Boat Club. At Oxford, the Reverend Woodgate's son earned pocket money by writing sermons. As a fresh-faced Brasenose fresher, he appeared as Lady Barbara in the College play, partook liberally of the wine and four kinds of punch at dinner afterwards, woke in his petticoats, and attended chapel with the rouge still on his cheeks. Two years later he founded Vincent's Club. A larger than life character, he once wagered he could walk the fifty-seven miles from Stones Chop House in London's Panton Street (near Leicester Square) to Brasenose in time for breakfast. He lingered at Oxford well into the 1860s, mainly on the river.

In 1872 Woodgate was called to the bar. He practised for forty years but took neither the law nor anything else save rowing too seriously and it is as a first-class oarsman and journalistic critic of rowing that he is remembered.

Woodgate remained active well into later life. He even joined up for the First World War. In July 1916, at the age of 72, he enlisted as a private in the 7th City of London Regiment (Veteran Athletes Corps), although he did not see active service, serving instead with the regiment's garrison battalion.

A lifelong bachelor, Woodgate died in Southampton at the age of 79.

== Rowing achievements ==
An accomplished oarsman and sculler he won the University Pairs three times and the Sculls twice. As well as rowing for his own college, he rowed twice in the winning Oxford crews in the Boat Race – in the 1862 race (in the bow seat) and in the 1863 race (in the no. 4 seat).

=== Henley Royal Regatta ===
- 1861 – Silver Goblets (with Weldon Champneys)
- 1861 – Wyfold Challenge Cup (Brasenose College Boat Club)
- 1862 – Silver Goblets (with Weldon Champneys)
- 1862 – Stewards' Challenge Cup (Brasenose College Boat Club)
- 1862 – Visitors' Challenge Cup (Brasenose College Boat Club)
- 1863 – Silver Goblets (with R Shepherd) (Brasenose College Boat Club)
- 1863 – Visitors' Challenge Cup (Brasenose College Boat Club)
- 1864 – Diamond Challenge Sculls (after a dead heat two years previously)
- 1865 – Grand Challenge Cup (Kingston Rowing Club)
- 1866 – Silver Goblets (with Edward Corrie)
- 1868 – Silver Goblets (with William Crofts)

Woodgate caused controversy at Henley Royal Regatta and his actions twice resulted in changes to Henley's rules. In 1866 he entered the Silver Goblets twice, once as W. B. Woodgate with Edward Corrie, and again as "Wat Bradford" with M. M. Brown. The Woodgate and Corrie pair won the event, but after the regatta the Henley Stewards changed the rules so competitors could not row under assumed names.

In 1868, he concluded that a coxed four could be steered using a wire and lever attached to an oarsman's footrest, so the weight of the coxwain could be dispensed with. He gave notice to Henley's regatta committee that his Brasenose four would row without a cox in the following day's race against Kingston and the Oscillators Club. The committee immediately countered with a new rule requiring all boats to be coxed, so Woodgate arranged for his Brasenose coxswain (Frederic Weatherly) to jump overboard at the start of the Stewards' Challenge Cup to lighten his Brasenose coxed four. While the unwanted cox narrowly escaped strangulation by the water lilies, Woodgate and his home-made steering device triumphed by 100 yards. The outraged Henley committee disqualified the Brasenose four and passed another rule that henceforth all crews must finish with the same number they started with.

A special prize for four-oared crews without coxswains was offered at the regatta in 1869 when it was won by the Oxford Radleian Club and when Stewards' became a coxless race in 1873, Woodgate "won his moral victory", The Rowing Almanack later recalled. "Nothing but defeating a railway in an action at law could have given him so much pleasure."

He helped coach numerous Oxford Boat Race crews and was president of Kingston Rowing Club. He also coached the Cambridge crew in the 1883 Boat Race.

== Vincent's Club ==
Woodgate's major non-aquatic accomplishment at Oxford was the founding in 1863 of Vincent's Club (named for the landlord who let the rooms), in reaction to the Union Society. The Union at the time barred smoking and drinking and, in Woodgate's view, "went through the farce of socially 'vetting' every candidate, and after all, passing all sorts and conditions of men as 'sound', despite notorious antecedents." So he and his friends made Vincent's selective ("a magic number – 100 – to give prestige") and offered beer, tea, and coffee, all for free lest the proctors intervene were drinks "for sale". An immediate success, Vincent's climbed straight to the top of the undergraduate social heap. Among its later presidents were rowers Bankes, Nickalls, and Cotton.

Woodgate created Vincent's very much in his own image. He wanted an elite social club of "the picked hundred of the University, selected for all round qualities; social, physical and intellectual". He loathed the Union, which he felt made only a pretence at selectivity, and finally he gathered forty of his friends and rented rooms at 90, High Street, above Vincent's, the printer's and publisher's shop. If invited to subscribe, the 30 shillings per term included free beer, coffee and tea, none of which could be had at the Union, even for payment; and free postage on letters. Smoking was also allowed, again in contrast to the Union, and dogs were admitted to the clubroom, presumably to accommodate Woodgate's fox terrier, Jenny, a notorious shredder of trouser legs.

== Writing ==
As well as providing the rowing coverage in Vanity Fair for most of the years there was any to speak of, Woodgate had several books published:

- Oars and Sculls, and How to Use Them (1874)
- The O. V. H.; or, How Mr. Blake became an M. F. H. (1884)
- Boating (1888, for the Badminton Library set),
- Rowing and Sculling ... Illustrated (1889 for the All England Series)
- A Modern Layman's Faith (1893)
- Tandem (a novel) (1895)
- Reminiscences of an Old Sportsman (1909)

He contributed to The Field for half a century, frequently "produc[ing] the leading article in a curious but flexible English, which was quite unmistakable." Woodgate's writing attests to his clerical family background, classical Greek and Latin schooling, years of lawyering, and an unsuppressable urge to tell stories, laced with legalisms and couplets from Horace. He could, wrote T. A. Cook, who rowed for Oxford in 1889 with Vanity Fair's Guy Nickalls, "write anything from a curate's sermon to a leading article on the Torts of Landlords or a racy description of a prize fight and a sculling match."

== See also ==
- List of Oxford University Boat Race crews
