= Benjamin Hunting Howell =

American rower

- In Harper's Weekly in 1899
- Born: September 3, 1875; New York, New York, US
- Died: February 26, 1953 (aged 77); New York, New York, US
- Education: Trinity Hall, Cambridge
- Occupations: Rower, maufacturer

Benjamin Hunting Howell (September 3, 1875 – February 26, 1953) was an American rower who won the Diamond Challenge Sculls at Henley Royal Regatta and the Wingfield Sculls in 1898 and 1899.

== Biography ==
Howell was born in New York City the son of Frederick Hunting Howell of Wall Street, New York and his wife Katherine Van Liew Howell. He was educated at the Military College in America and at Trinity Hall, Cambridge, England. In 1897 he rowed in the Cambridge boat in the Boat Race in the penultimate in a ten-year series of wins by Oxford. He challenged in the Wingfield Sculls in 1897 but lost to Harry Blackstaffe. In 1898, he won the Diamond Challenge Sculls at Henley and the Wingfield Sculls, beating Harry Blackstaffe in both. He joined Thames Rowing Club and won the Diamond Challenge Sculls and the Wingfield Sculls beating Blackstaffe again in 1899. In 1900 he lost the Diamond Sculls to Edward Hemmerde, and the Wingfield Sculls to Blackstaffe.

Howell became a manufacturer of Tuxedo Park, New York. When his mother died in 1911 she made him the major legatee of her will because "he bestowed care on me during my illness while his brother and sister quite neglected me".

Howell died from heart disease at his home in Manhattan on February 26, 1953.

== See also ==
- List of Cambridge University Boat Race crews
