= Metropolitan Regatta =

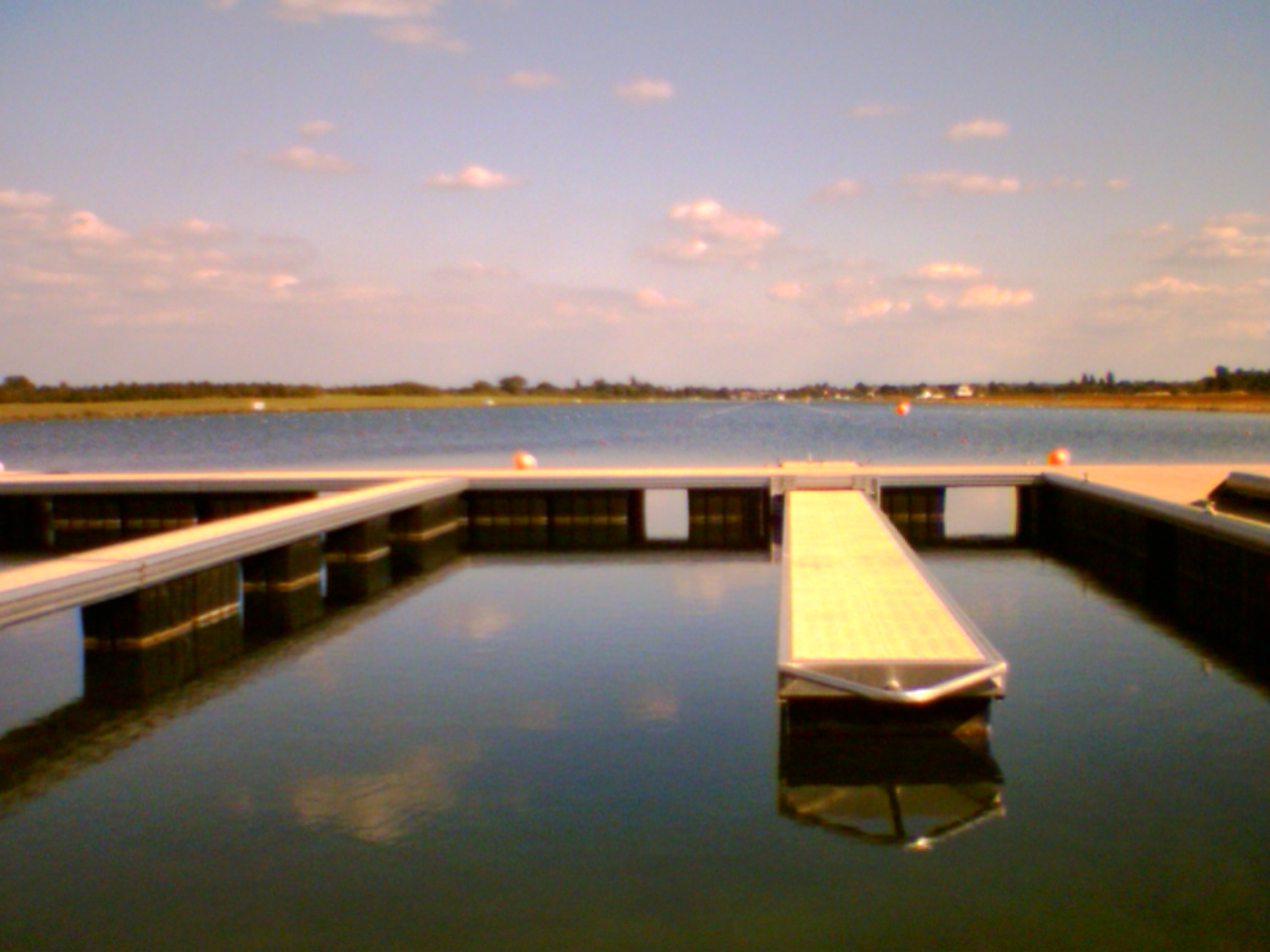
Dorney Lake, location of the Metropolitan Regatta since 2001.

The Metropolitan Regatta is an international rowing regatta. It takes place on Dorney Lake, Buckinghamshire near Eton next to the River Thames in southern England. It attracts crews from schools, clubs, and universities from around the United Kingdom, Europe and the United States. The Metropolitan Regatta was established in 1866 on the tideway through the initiative of Herbert Playford, Captain of London Rowing Club. The event's first honorary secretary was Charles Dickens, Jr. The Regatta ran until 1977 on a course between Putney and Hammersmith of a mile and three-quarters. The regatta resumed in 1980, at Thorpe Park, Surrey. It moved to Royal Albert Dock in 1988 and its current home at Dorney Lake in 2001.

The four original challenge trophies, which have been joined by many others, are:

- The Metropolitan Champion Cup for Men's Elite Eights
- The Thames Cup for Men's Elite Coxless Fours
- The London Cup for Men's Elite Single Scullers
- The Metropolitan Challenge Cup for Men's Senior 3 Eights

== See also ==
- Rowing on the River Thames
