= Walter Francis Short =

Walter Francis Short (1832–1910) was an English academic, schoolmaster, clergyman and rower.

Short was the son of Rev William Short, vicar of Chippenham and his wife Jane Awdry, eldest daughter of John Awdry of Notton, Wiltshire. He matriculated at New College, Oxford, in 1851. He was bowman in the winning Oxford University eight in the Grand Challenge Cup at Henley Royal Regatta in 1852, and was runner-up in Silver Goblets paired with Martin Irving against Philip Nind and Henry Raine Barker in the final. He was in the winning Oxford crew in the Grand Challenge Cup crew again in 1853. In 1854 he was in the winning Oxford crew in the Boat Race and at Henley he won Silver Goblets paired with Edward Cadogan. Short and Cadogan lost in the final of SIlver Goblets in 1855 to A. A. Casamajor and Josias Nottidge.

Short was a Fellow of New College from 1851 to 1883. He was an assistant master at Rossall School from 1857 to 1859 and became headmaster of Oswestry Grammar School in 1860. In 1863 he returned to New College, where he was subwarden in 1863, burser in 1864 and tutor from 1864 to 1870. He became junior dean in 1867 and was proctor from 1869 to 1870. In 1879 he became chaplain of Royal Military Academy, Woolwich and in 1875 became warden of St Paul's College, Stony Stratford, Buckinghamshire until 1878. He was tutor of Keble College, Oxford, from 1881 until 1882 when he became rector of Donhead St Mary, Wiltshire, in 1882 until 1901.

Short died in Wiltshire at the age of 79.

== See also ==
- List of Oxford University Boat Race crews
