= Edward Buck =

Edward Buck may refer to:

- Edward Buck (rower) (1859–?), English schoolmaster and rower
- Edward Buck (lawyer) (1814–1876), American lawyer
- Edward Charles Buck (1838–1916), British civil servant in the Indian Civil Service
- Ed Buck (born 1954), American political activist
