= Martin Howy Irving =

Australian educator (1831–1912)

Martin Howy Irving (21 February 1831 – 23 January 1912) was an English rower and educationist who spent nearly all his career in Australia.

Irving was born in St Pancras, London to Edward Irving and his wife Isabella Martin. At Oxford he was an active rower and won the college and university sculls in 1852. In the same year, he was runner up in the Silver Goblets paired with Walter Francis Short and losing to Philip Nind and Henry Raine Barker in the final. He was also runner-up in the Diamond Challenge Sculls to Stephen Rippingall in 1853.

Irving was twice married. His first marriage in 1855 was to Caroline Mary Bruyeres, daughter of Captain Bruyeres and they had four sons and two daughters. His second wife was Mary Mowat, daughter of John Mowat of Dublin, and they had one son and seven daughters. Two of his daughters, Margaret and Lilian,

Irving died at Albury near Guildford in 1912, at the age of 80.

Academic offices
Preceded by Anthony Brownless	Vice-Chancellor of the University of Melbourne; 1887 – 1889	Succeeded by Sir John Madden
