= Alfred Trower =

English rower

Alfred Trower (3 May 1849 – 1880) was an English rower who won events at Henley Royal Regatta.

Trower was born at 2 Southwick Place, Hyde Park, London, the son of Henry Trower, a wine merchant, and his wife Helen Seymour. He joined Kingston Rowing Club making his first Henley appearance in 1870 and in 1873 won Silver Goblets at Henley partnering Clement Courtenay Knollys to beat Albert de Lande Long and Francis Gulston in the final In 1874 he partnered Mair but they lost the final easily to Long and Gulston. Trower then transferred to London Rowing Club and in August 1876 Trower, together with Gulston, R H Labat, and J Rowell went to Philadelphia on the steam ship Wyoming to take part in the town's centennial regatta. Trower competed in the pairs with Rowell. Prior to the event the rowers went for a swim in the Harlem giving scope for the local newspapers to describe their physiques. The New York Times wrote of Trower "The heavy man of the four, he is also the tallest"

In 1877 Trower was a member of the London crew that won the Grand Challenge Cup at Henley. In 1878 he was a member of the London crew that won the Stewards' Challenge Cup. In addition to rowing, Trower was a yachtsman and competed in Corinthian races.

Trower died at Kensington at the age of 30.
