= David Riches =

David Riches may refer to:

- David Riches (rower), Scottish rower
- David Riches (anatomist), British anatomist
