= Stanley le Blanc Smith =

English rower

This entry confuses two different sons and needs amending.

STUART le Blanc Smith (1844–1933) was an English rower who won several events at Henley Royal Regatta including Silver Goblets.

Smith was born at Barnet, Hertfordshire, the son of Rev. Thomas Tunstall Smith then curate there, who became vicar of Wirksworth for 42 years, and his wife Lucy Mary le Blanc. He was educated at Radley College . Though he rowed at Oxford, he was only a reserve for the Oxford crews in the Boat Race. After university, he joined the London Stock Exchange.

Smith, nicknamed "Slebs", joined London Rowing Club and was a member of the crews that won the Stewards' Challenge Cup at Henley Royal Regatta every year from 1872 to 1878. He also won Silver Goblets in 1876 with Francis Gulston although in 1877 with Frank Lumley Playford, he was runner up to James Hastie and W H Eyre of Thames Rowing Club. In 1878 Smith was the first secretary of the Metropolitan Rowing Association, which was to become the Amateur Rowing Association

Smith was on the management committee for the 1908 Summer Olympics where the rowing events were held at Henley.

Smith married firstly Lucy Smith in 1869 - died 1914 and secondly Eveline Caroline Mary Ellis.
