= Silver Goblets & Nickalls' Challenge Cup =

Event at the Henley Royal Regatta

- Venue: Henley Royal Regatta, River Thames
- Location: Henley-on-Thames, Oxfordshire
- Dates: 1845–present

The Silver Goblets & Nickalls' Challenge Cup is a rowing event for men's coxless pairs at the annual Henley Royal Regatta on the River Thames at Henley-on-Thames in England. It is open to male crews from all eligible rowing clubs. Two clubs may combine to make an entry.

== History ==
The Silver Goblets was established in 1850, replacing a previous competition the Silver Wherries. In 1895, Tom Nickalls, father of Guy Nickalls and Vivian Nickalls Nickalls presented the Nickalls Challenge Cup to go with the Silver Goblets.

== Past winners ==
Trophy presented to Dick Eason in 1923

=== Silver Wherries (1845–1849) ===
Year	Winning crew	Club	Distance	Runner-up	Club	ref
1845	G. Mann; Frederick Arnold	Caius College, Cm	2L	Henry Chapman; Edward Peacock	London	
1846	Mark Haggard; William Milman,	Christ Church, Ox	3L	E Fellows; Thomas Fellows	Exon; Leander Club	
1847	William Falls; W Coulthard	St George's Club	on appeal	T. Pollock; Thomas Fellows	Leander Club	
1848	Mark Haggard; William Milman	Christ Church, Ox	Dsq	LD Bruce; S Wallace	Thames Club	
1849	Edward Peacock; Francis Playford	Thames Club	2L	C. H. Steward; T. H. Michell	Oriel College, Ox	

=== Silver Goblets (1850–1894) ===
Year	Winning crew	Club	Distance	Runner-up	Club	ref
1850	James John Hornby; Joseph William Chitty	Ocford Univ BC	NTT E	C L Vaughan; Thomas Fellows	Oriel College, Ox; Leander Club	
1851	James Aitkin; Joseph William Chitty	Exeter College, Ox; Balliol College Ox		John Clarke; C L Vaughan	Wadham College, Ox; Oriel College, Ox	
1852	Henry Raine Barker; Philip Henry Nind	Christ Church, Ox	RO	Walter Francis Short; Martin Howy Irving	New College, Ox; Balliol College, Ox	
1853	Robert Gordon; John Buckle Barlee	Christ's College, Cm	10.0 2L	G B Forster; J Wright	St John's College Cm	
1854	Walter Francis Short; Edward Cadogan	New College; Christ Church, Ox	9.36 E	JC Swaine; D Craven	St. John's College Ox	
1855	A. A. Casamajor; Josias Nottidge	Wandle Club	E	Walter Francis Short; Edward Cadogan	New College, Ox; Christ Church, Ox	
1856	A. A. Casamajor; Josias Nottidge	Argonaut Club	E	Herbert Playford; James Paine	Argonaut Club	
1857	E Warre; Arthur Heywood-Lonsdale	Balliol College Ox	9.22 E	F Halcombe; T G Jackson	Wadham College, Ox	
1858	Herbert Playford; A. A. Casamajor	London Rowing Club	1 1/2 L	Edmond Warre; Arthur Heywood-Lonsdale	Balliol College Ox	
1859	Edmond Warre; John Arkell	Balliol College Ox; Pembroke College, Ox	9.0 4L	A. A. Casamajor; James Paine	London Rowing Club	
1860	A. A. Casamajor; W. Woodbridge	London Rowing Club	11.50 2L	D. Inglis; N. Royds	Cambridge	
1861	Weldon Champneys; Walter Bradford Woodgate	Brasenose College, Ox	NTT E	Arthur Moseley Channell; A D Burney	Cambridge	
1862	Weldon Champneys; Walter Bradford Woodgate	Brasenose College, Ox	8.45 1L	J C Hawkshaw; J G Chambers	Third Trinity, Cm	
1863	R Shepherd; Walter Bradford Woodgate	Brasenose College, Ox	RO	row over	n/a	
1864	John Richardson Selwyn; Robert Kinglake	Third Trinity, Cm	9.9 E	L P Brickwood; Edwin Brickwood	London Rowing Club	
1865	J C F May; F Fenner	London Rowing Club	9.7 4L	H Snow; Edmond Warre	Eton College	
1866	Edward Corrie; Walter Bradford Woodgate	Kingston Rowing Club	9.23 svl L	A Kemble; M S Foster	New College, Ox	
1867	E L Corrie; M M Brown	Kingston Rowing Club	9.49 svl L	R T Raikes; Walter Bradford Woodgate	Oxford Radleian	
1868	William Crofts; Walter Bradford Woodgate	Brasenose College, Ox	NTT E	L P Muirhead; E Phelps	Cambridge	
1869	Albert de Lande Long; William Stout	London Rowing Club	9.20 3 L	W C Calvert; T K McClintock-Bun	Eton College	
1870	Edward Corrie; E Hall	Kingston Rowing Club	paddled	John Brooks Close; J B Close	Trinity College, Cm	
1871	Albert de Lande Long; Francis Gulston	London Rowing Club	10.17 1 1/4 L	John Brooks Close; J B Close	Trinity College, Cm	
1873	Clement Courtenay Knollys; Alfred Trower	Kingston Rowing Club	9.22 E	Albert de Lande Long; Francis Gulston	London Rowing Club	
1874	Albert de Lande Long; Francis Gulston	London Rowing Club	NTT E	J Mair; Alfred Trower	Kingston Rowing Club	
1875	W Chillingworth; C Herbert	Ino Rowing Club	9.3 Dsq	Albert de Lande Long; Francis Gulston	London Rowing Club	
1876	Stanley le Blanc Smith; Francis Gulston	London Rowing Club	8.55 E	A E Campbell; R G Davey	Twickenham RC	
1877	W H Eyre; James Hastie	Thames Rowing Club	paddled	Stanley le Blanc Smith; Frank Lumley Playford	London Rowing Club	
1878	Tom Cottingham Edwards-Moss; William Augustine Ellison	Oxford Etonian	9.14 E	A H Prior; H Sanford	Lady Margaret BC	
1879	Robert H. Labat; Francis Gulston	London Rowing Club	11.16 Svl L	W H Eyre; James Hastie	Thames Rowing Club	
1880	W H Eyre; James Hastie	Thames Rowing Club	8.45 5L	Aexander Payne; F D Leader	Molesey Boat Club	
1881	W H Eyre; James Hastie	Thames Rowing Club	9.4 3-4L	P Adcock; Frank Lumley Playford	London Rowing Club	
1882	David Edward Brown; Jefferson Lowndes	Hertford College, Ox	paddled	P Adcock; Frank Lumley Playford	London Rowing Club	
1883	George Quinlan Roberts; David Edward Brown	Twickenham RC	9.22 E	H B Tween; James Hastie	Thames Rowing Club	
1884	Jefferson Lowndes; David Edward Brown	Twickenham RC	9.1 E	G R B Earnshaw; C E Earnshaw	London Rowing Club	
1885	Hector McLean; Douglas McLean	Oxford Etonian	E	G R B Earnshaw; C E Earnshaw	London Rowing Club	
1886	Fraser Churchill; Stanley Muttlebury	Third Trinity, Cm	8.40 1/2 L	Hector McLean; DH McLean	New College, Ox	
1887	Charles Theodore Barclay; Stanley Muttlebury	Third Trinity, Cm	8.15	Hector McLean; Douglas McLean	New College, Ox	
1888	Noel Symonds; Edward Buck	Cambridge Univ BC; Oxford Univ BC	paddled	Douglas McLean; Stanley Muttlebury	Leander Club	
1889	James Cardwell Gardner; Stanley Muttlebury	Cambridge Univ BC	8.25 2 ft	Oliver Russell; Guy Nickalls	Oxford Univ BC	
1890	Oliver Russell; Guy Nickalls	Oxford Univ BC	8.38 1 3/4 L	G Francklyn; Stanley Muttlebury	Third Trinity, Cm	
1891	Oliver Russell; Guy Nickalls	Leander Club	8.36 1L	F Wilenson; William Fletcher	Oxford Univ BC	
1892	Vivian Nickalls; William Fletcher	Oxford Univ BC	9.7 E	F E C Clark; Stanley Muttlebury	Thames Rowing Club	
1893	Vivian Nickalls; William Fletcher	Oxford Univ BC	8.44 E	R O Kerrison; T G Lewis	Third Trinity, Cm	
1894	Vivian Nickalls; Guy Nickalls	Formosa Boat Club	9.35 1 L	J Crisp; G Smith	Kingston Rowing Club	

=== Silver Goblets & Nickalls' Challenge Cup (1895–1939) ===
Year	Winning crew	Club	Distance	Runner-up	Club	ref
1895	Vivian Nickalls; Guy Nickalls	London Rowing Club	9.11	W Broughton; Stanley Muttlebury	Thames Rowing Club	
1896	Vivian Nickalls; Guy Nickalls	London Rowing Club	9.10 E	W E Crum; C M Pitman	New College, Ox	
1897	E R Balfour; Guy Nickalls	Leander Club	8.59	A S Bell; W J Fernie	Trinity Hall, Cm	
1898	A Bogle; W J Fernie	Thames Rowing Club	8.41 E	A M Hutchinson; Steve Fairbairn	Jesus College, Ox	
1899	C K Philips; H W M Willis	Leander Club	8.49 1 1/4 L	G E Orme; D Pennington	St George's Hospital	
1900	Claude Goldie; Graham Maitland	Trinity College Cm	8.33 2 1/2 L	William Dudley Ward; Raymond Etherington-Smith	Trinity College Cm	
1901	J H Hale; Felix Warre	Balliol College Ox	8.50 2 L	Oscar de Somville; Marcel Van Crombrugge	Club Nautique	
1902	William Dudley Ward; Claude Taylor	Third Trinity, Cm	8.36	Hon. C E Craven; J W Knight	London Rowing Club	
1903	Lothar Klaus; Alfred Ehrenberg	Victoria RC, Berlin	8.45s. easily	Douglas Stuart; C M Steele	Kingston Rowing Club	
1904	Claude Goldie; Claude Taylor	Third Trinity, Cm	8.33 E	Julius Beresford; Harry Blackstaffe	Kensington RC; Vesta Rowing Club	
1905	Roland Nelson; P H Thomas	Third Trinity, Cm	8.40s	Douglas Stuart; Charles Vincent Fox	London Rowing Club	
1906	Banner Johnstone; Ronald Powell	Third Trinity, Cm	9.15 3 L	Urbain Molmans; Guillaume Visser	Sport Nautique de Gand	
1907	Banner Johnstone; Ronald Powell	Leander Club	8.52 E	Julius Beresford; Karl Vernon	Thames Rowing Club	
1908	Harold Barker; Albert Gladstone	Christ Church, Ox	8.26 E	Julius Beresford; Karl Vernon	Thames Rowing Club	
1909	Banner Johnstone; Edward Gordon Williams	Leander Club	8.30 3 L	Julius Beresford; Karl Vernon	Thames Rowing Club	
1910	John Burn; Gordon Thomson	Leander Club	8.45s. 3/4 L	Albertus Wielsma; Bernardus Croon	De Amstel Rowing Club	
1911	Julius Beresford; Arthur Cloutte	Thames Rowing Club	8m 15 1 1/2 L	N M Bruce; Albert Gladstone	Christ Church, Ox	
1912	Bruce Logan; Charles Rought	Thames Rowing Club	8.36 1 1/4 L	LJ Cadbury; F E Hellyer	Trinity College Cm	
1913	Alfred A. Swann; Sidney Swann	Trinity Hall, Cm	8.39 1 1/2 L	S D Gladstone; C E V Buxton	Old Etonians	
1914	Alfred A. Swann; Sidney Swann	Trinity Hall, Cm	9.2 1 L	Edward Gordon Williams; R Le Blanc-Smith	Third Trinity, Cm	
No races 1915–1919 (WWI)
1920	Guy Oliver Nickalls; Richard Lucas	Magdalen College, Ox	8.53 E	Ian Fairbairn; Bruce Logan	Thames Rowing Club	
1921	John Campbell; Humphrey Playford	Jesus College, Cm	8.52 E	Guy Oliver Nickalls; Richard Lucas	Magdalen College, Ox	
1922	Guy Oliver Nickalls; Richard Lucas	Magdalen College, Ox	9.19 E	H E West; Karl Vernon	Thames Rowing Club	
1923	W F Godden; Richard Edward Eason	Trinity College, Ox	8.12 5 ft	Guy Oliver Nickalls; Humphrey Playford	Leander Club	
1924	Maxwell Eley; James MacNabb	Third Trinity, Cm	10.6 3 L	G E G Gadson; C E Pitman	Christ Church Ox	
1925	Robert Morrison; E C Hamilton-Russell	Third Trinity, Cm	8.17 4 L	Guy Oliver Nickalls; Richard Lucas	Leander Club	
1926	H R Carver; Edric Hamilton-Russell	Third Trinity, Cm	8.36 1 1/4 L	Guy Oliver Nickalls; A D B Pearson	Leander Club	
1927	Robert Nisbet; Terence O'Brien	London Rowing Club	9.23 1 3/4 L	Guy Oliver Nickalls; H O C Boret	Leander Club	
1928	Gordon Killick; Jack Beresford	Thames Rowing Club	9.57 E	C Daniel; J London	Quintin Boat Club	
1929	Gordon Killick; Jack Beresford	Thames Rowing Club	8.32 1 3/4 L	A Graham; H C Morphett	Brasenose College, Ox	
1930	Walter Prideaux; Harold Rickett	Third Trinity, Cm	8.42 2 L	A Graham; C M Johnston	Brasenose College, Ox	
1931	Hugh Edwards; Lewis Clive	Christ Church, Ox	9.57 4 L	William Sambell; Lewis Luxton	Pembroke College, Cm	
1932	Hugh Edwards; Lewis Clive	Christ Church, Ox	9.5 3 L	W H Migotti; J H Lascelles	Gordouli Boat Club	
1933	J H C Powell; J E Gilmour	Eton Vikings	9.17 E	E F Bigland; T S Bigland	Royal Chester RC	
1934	Herbert Braun; Hans-Georg Möllner	'Wiking', Germany	8.9 1 1/4 L	E F Bigland; T S Bigland	Royal Chester RC	
1935	Thomas Cree; David Burnford	Jesus College, Cm	8.20 2 1/2 L	B S Fidler; D G Newton	Thames Rowing Club	
1936	Dick Offer; Jack Offer	Kingston Rowing Club	9.17 1 1/4 L	Eric W. Wingate; W. David Baddeley	Vesta Rowing Club	
1937	Eric W. Wingate; W. David. Baddeley	Vesta Rowing Club	9.43 3 L	Desmond Kingsford; G M Lewis	London Rowing Club	
1938	Ran Laurie; Jack Wilson	Leander Club	8.8 E	E F Bigland; T S Bigland	Royal Chester RC	
1939	C .Bevis Sanford; Hugh Parker	Trinity Hall, Cm	9.5 2 1/2 L	Farn Carpmael; R Parker	London Rowing Club	
No races 1940–1945 (WWII)

=== 1946–1999 ===
Year	Winning crew	Club	Distance	Runner-up	Club	ref
1946	John F. Burgess; Christopher G. Burgess	Leander Club	8.47 NRO	Ole Secher; P Paerregaard	Dansk Forening, DEN	
1947	John Pinches; Edward Sturges	London Rowing Club	8.46 2 1/2 L	J. R. W. Gleave; D. G. Jamison	Magdalen College, Oxford	
1948	Ran Laurie; Jack Wilson	Leander Club	8.30 3 L	Spencer Grace; Ted Bromley	Mosman RC, NSW, AUS	
1949	Tony Butcher; Tom Christie	Thames Rowing Club	8.20 2 1/2 L	R. C. Morris; Alan Burrough	Thames Rowing Club	
1950	Jos Rosa; Charles Van Antwerpen	SRN Anversoise, BEL	9.10 3/4 L	John Pinches; Edward Sturges	London Rowing Club	
1951	James Crowden; Brian Lloyd	Pembroke College, Cm; Lady Margaret BC, Cm	8.52 E	Jos Rosa; Charles Van Antwerpen	SRN Anversoise, Belgium	
1952	Henry Chris I. Bywater; Tom Christie	Westminster Hospital	8.6 1 1/3 L	Tony Leadley; J. N. King	Emmanuel College, Cm	
1953	Bob Baetens; Michel Knuysen	Antwerp Sculling Club	8.10 4 L	Herbert Kesel; Klaus Hahn	Ruderclub Saar, Saarbrücken	
1954	Igor Buldakov; Viktor Ivanov	Khimik, USSR	8.44 2 L	S. L. Blom; R. Gitz	KRZHS, NED	
1955	Igor Buldakov; Viktor Ivanov	Club Khimik, USSR	8.30 4 L	James Gobbo; Christopher Davidge	Leander Club	
1956	R. J. M. Thompson; Geoffrey Mark Wolfson	Pembroke College, Cm	8.45 3 L	Alan M. Clay; Bill H. Findlay	Marlow Rowing Club	
1957	Tony Leadley; Christopher Davidge	Leander Club	8.17 1/3 L	Josef Kloimstein; Alfred Sageder	EKuRV Donau, Austria	
1958	Tony Leadley; Christopher Davidge	Leander Club	8.4 3 1/2 L	Rolf Streuli; Gottfried Kottmann	Belvoir RC, Zurich, SWI	
1959	Richard B. Norton; Hugh H. Scurfield	Hertford College, Ox	8.20 E	Michael Beresford; Colin Porter	London Rowing Club	
1960	Ian Elliott; D C Rutherford	Keble College, Ox; Magdalen College, Ox	7.58 2/3 L	Richard Nicholson; Clive Marshall	Nottingham Britannia	
1961	Veli Lehtelä; Toimi Pitkänen	Valkeakosken V, FIN	8.9 E	Richard C. Waite; Richard J. Nicholson	Nottingham & U RC & Nottingham Britannia	
1962	Wolfgang Neuß; Klaus-Günter Jordan	RC Nassovia Hochst, FRG	8.2 2 L	Stewart Farquharson; David Lee Nicholson	Univ of London BC; MH	
1963	Christopher Davidge; Stuart Mackenzie	Leander Club	7.55 4 L	Joseph Amlong; Thomas Amlong	Vesper Boat Club, USA	
1964	John R. Kiely; John Lecky	Leander Club	7.53 2 L	Mike J. W. Hall; Robert A. Napier	Leander Club	
1965	Peter Gorny; Günter Bergau	ASK Vorwaerts Rostock	7.42 2 1/4 L	Herman Boelen; Jaap Enters	RV Willen III, NED	
1966	Jörg Lucke; Heinz-Jürgen Bothe	TSC, GDR	8.31 2 L	Ray Easterling; John T. McCarthy	Poplar Blackwall & Dis	
1967	Manfred Gelpke; Klaus Jacob	SCE Dresden, GDR	8.18 E	A. Jerry Sutton; Patrick J. Sharp	Sons of the Thames	
1968	A. Jerry Sutton; Patrick J. W. Sharp	Sons of the Thames	NTT E	James A. Hamilton; J. Simon B. McCowen	Tideway Scullers School	
1969	Urs Bitterli; Urs Fankhauser	See-Club Lucern	7.56 E	Richard C.Wait; Mike A. Sweeney	Nottingham Union RC	
1970	Hartmut Schreiber; Manfred Schmorde	SC Dynamo, GDR	8.17 E	George Xouris; Jeff R. Watt	Corio Bay RC, AUS	
1971	Glyn A. S. Locke; Tim Crooks	Thames Tradesmen's RC; Tideway Scullers School	8.7 E	Chris J. Dalley; Rob N. Winckless	Quintin Boat Club	
1972	Jerzy Broniec; Alfons Ślusarski	KK Wioslarski Bydgoszcz	7.59 2 1/4 L	Nikolay Vasilyev; Vladimir Poljakov	Spartak Leningrad, USSR	
1973	Mark Borchelt; Terry Adams	Potomac BC, USA	7.42 rowed in	Frank Dedecker; Paul De Weert	Antwerpse RV, BEL	
1974	Nikolay Ivanov; Vladimir Eshinov	Dynamo Club, USSR	7.59 E	James Macleod; Neil Christie	Lady Margaret BC, Cm	
1975	Harry Droog; Roel Luynenburg	ASR Nereus, NED	7.36 1/3 L	Glyn A. S. Locke; Frederick Smallbone	Leander Club; Thames	
1976	Ian Luxford; Chris Shinners	Sydney Univ BC, Australia	7.21 E	John Lecky; Richard Crooker	C d'A de Boucherville, Ca	
1977	Jim Clark; John A Roberts	Thames Tradesmen's RC	7.54 3 L	James Macleod; Neil Christie	St Thomas Hospital; London Rowing Club	
1978	Jim Clark; John A Roberts	Thames Tradesmen's RC	8.12 E	Kees J M de Veth; Aart Uttenboogaard	Holland	
1979	Charles Wiggin; Malcolm Carmichael	Leander Club	8.10 E	John W. Woodhouse; James S. Palmer	Cambridge Univ BC	
1980	Mark Borchelt; Fred Borchelt	Potomac BC, USA	8.2 E	James S. Palmer; Hugh Laurie	Eton Vikings	
1981	Thomas Francis Farrell Mossop; Chris J. Jones	Kingston Rowing Club	8.46 1 L	James Macleod; Neil Christie	London Rowing Club	
1982	Mirko Ivančić; Zlatko Celent	Veslacki Klub Gusar, YUG	8.11 1 1/2 L	Paul D. Wensley; Paul L. Reynolds	University of London; Kingston Rowing Club	
1983	Mostyn Field; Glen Hill	Tyrian Boat Club	7.48 E	Allan Whitwell; Martin Knight	Nottinghamshire CRA	
1984	Ewan Pearson; C. David M. Riches	CUBC; Molesey Boat Club	7.57	John Beattie; Richard Stanhope	Thames Tradesmen's RC	
1985	Ewan Pearson; C. David M. Riches	Molesey Boat Club	7.49 5 L	Frank Moore; Philip Browne	Neptune Rowing Club, Ireland	
1986	Andy Holmes; Steve Redgrave	Leander Club; Marlow Rowing Club	7.39 E	Ewan Pearson; C. David M. Riches	Molesey Boat Club	
1987	Andy Holmes; Steve Redgrave	Leander Club; Marlow Rowing Club	7.48 paddled in	Yuriy Pimenov; Nikolay Pimenov	Dinamo Moscow, USSR	
1988	Ted S. Swinford; John P. Riley	Penn AC, USA	7.48 E	Steve J. Chilmaid; Andy D. J. Butt	London Rowing Club	
1989	Simon Berrisford; Steve Redgrave	Leander Club	7.9 E	Volker Grabow; Guido Grabow	RC Witten, Germany	
1990	Karl Sinzinger Jr. Hermann Bauer	H Kapsch Linz, AUT	7.39 1 ft	Martin Cross; Tim Foster	Thames Tradesmen's RC; Star	
1991	Steve Redgrave; Matthew Pinsent	Leander Club	7.38 E	Josép Robert; Manolo Bermudez	Natacio Banyoles, Spain	
1992	David R. Gillard; Nick J. Clarry	Goldie Boat Club	7.30 3 L	Piers P. Ashley-Carter; Andy P. Murray	Leander Club	
1993	Steve Redgrave; Matthew Pinsent	Leander Club	7.22 1 L	Bill Coventry; Campbell Clayton-Greene	Waikato RC, NZL	
1994	Steve Redgrave; Matthew Pinsent	Leander Club	7.22 1 3/4 L	Jaak Van Driessche; Luc Goiris	Gentse RESV, BEL	
1995	Steve Redgrave; Matthew Pinsent	Leander Club	7.18 5 L	Roger D. T. Everington; Mark B. Partridge	London RC; Notts RC	
1996	Andreas Nader; Hermann Bauer	Rv Wiking Linz, Austria	7.22 4 1/2 L	Benedict Schmidt; Camille L. Codoni	Seeclub Zurich, Switz	
1997	Robert Thatcher; Ben Hunt-Davis	Leander Club	7.30 E	Claus P. Fischer; Sebastian Franke	Rg Hansa Hamburg, Ger	
1998	Laurent Béghin; Antoine Béghin	CN Gontier, FRA	7.34 E	Oliver Martinov; Ninoslav Saraga	HAVK "Mladost", Croatia	
1999	Steve Williams; Simon Dennis	Oxford Brookes Univ; Queen's Tower	7.25 3 1/4 L	David Weightman; Rob Scott	NSW Inst Sport, AUS	

==== Gallery ====
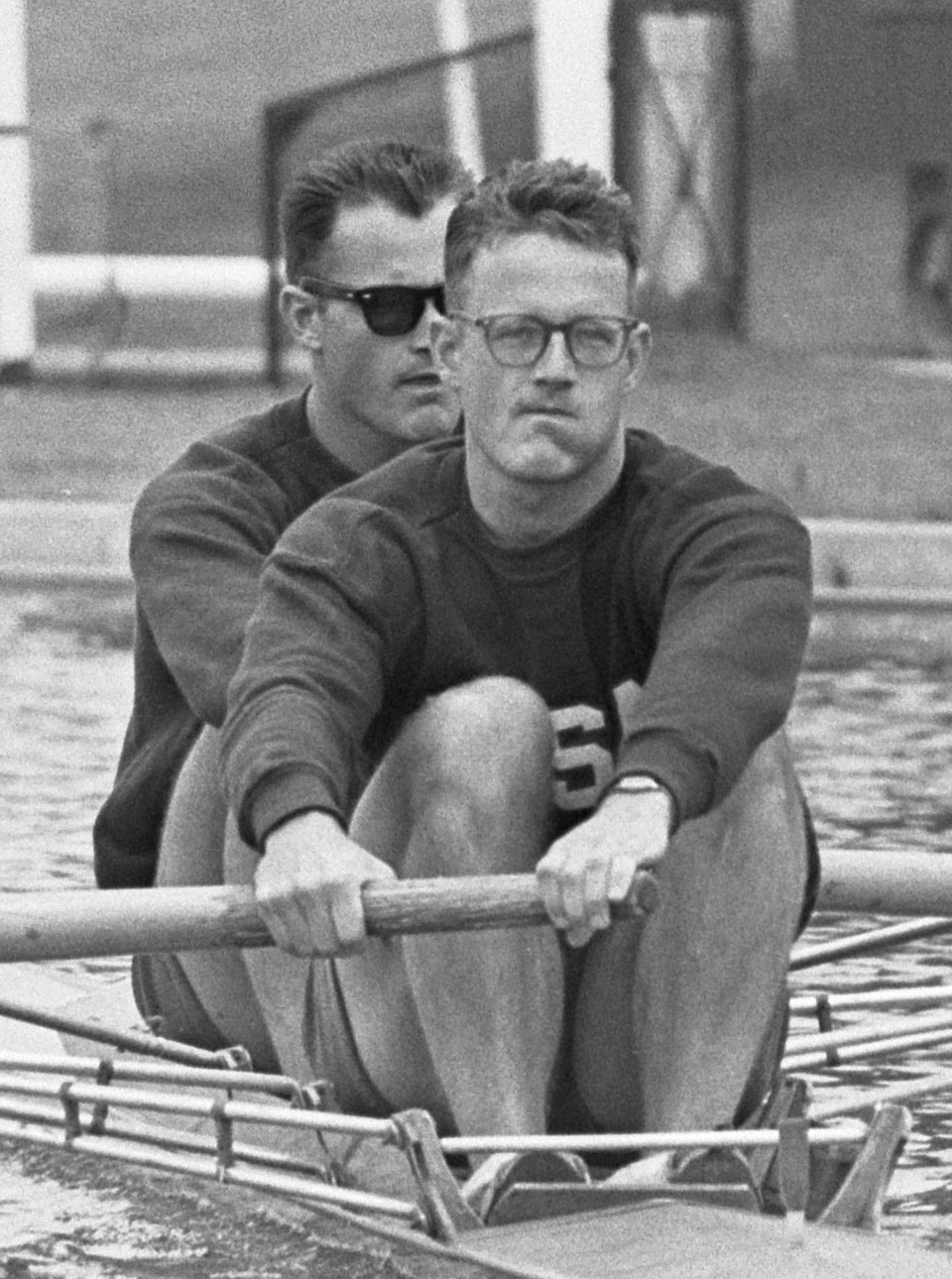
The Amlong brothers Tom and Joe finished runner-up in 1963

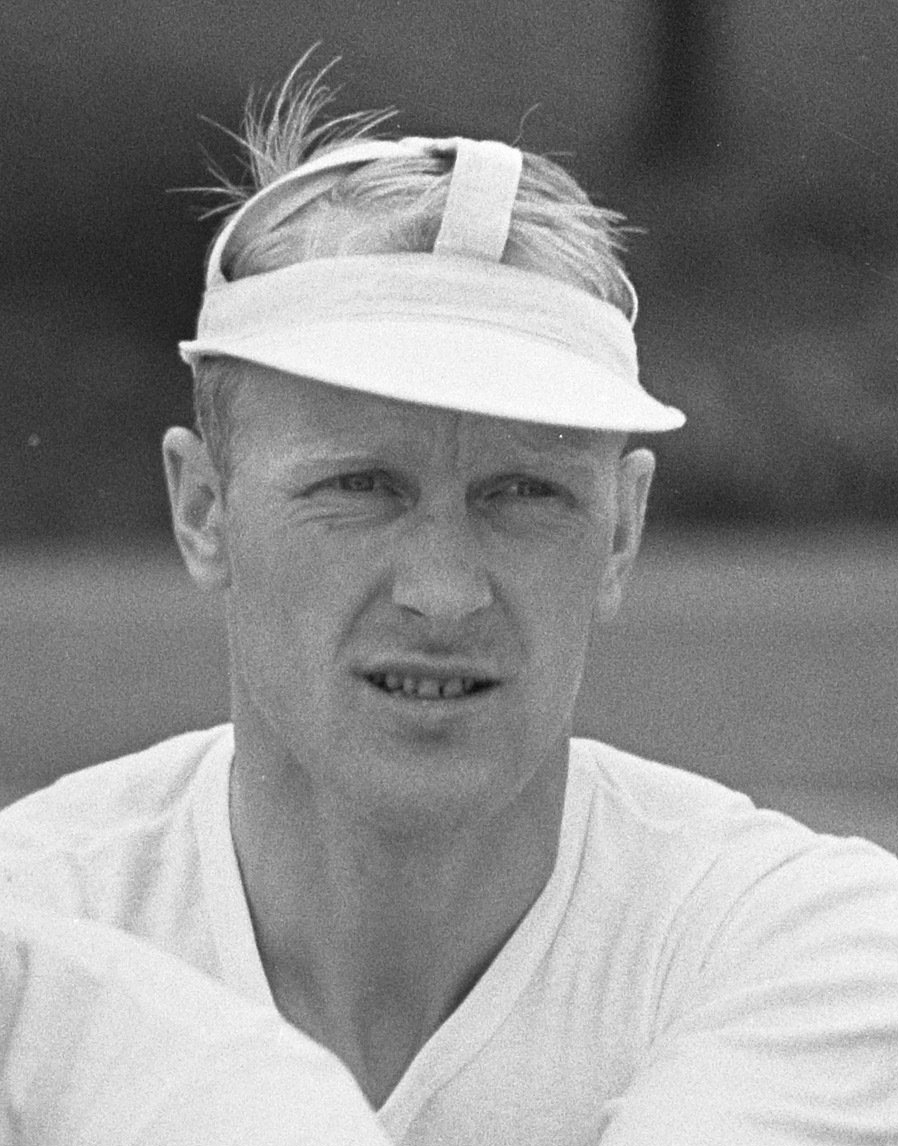

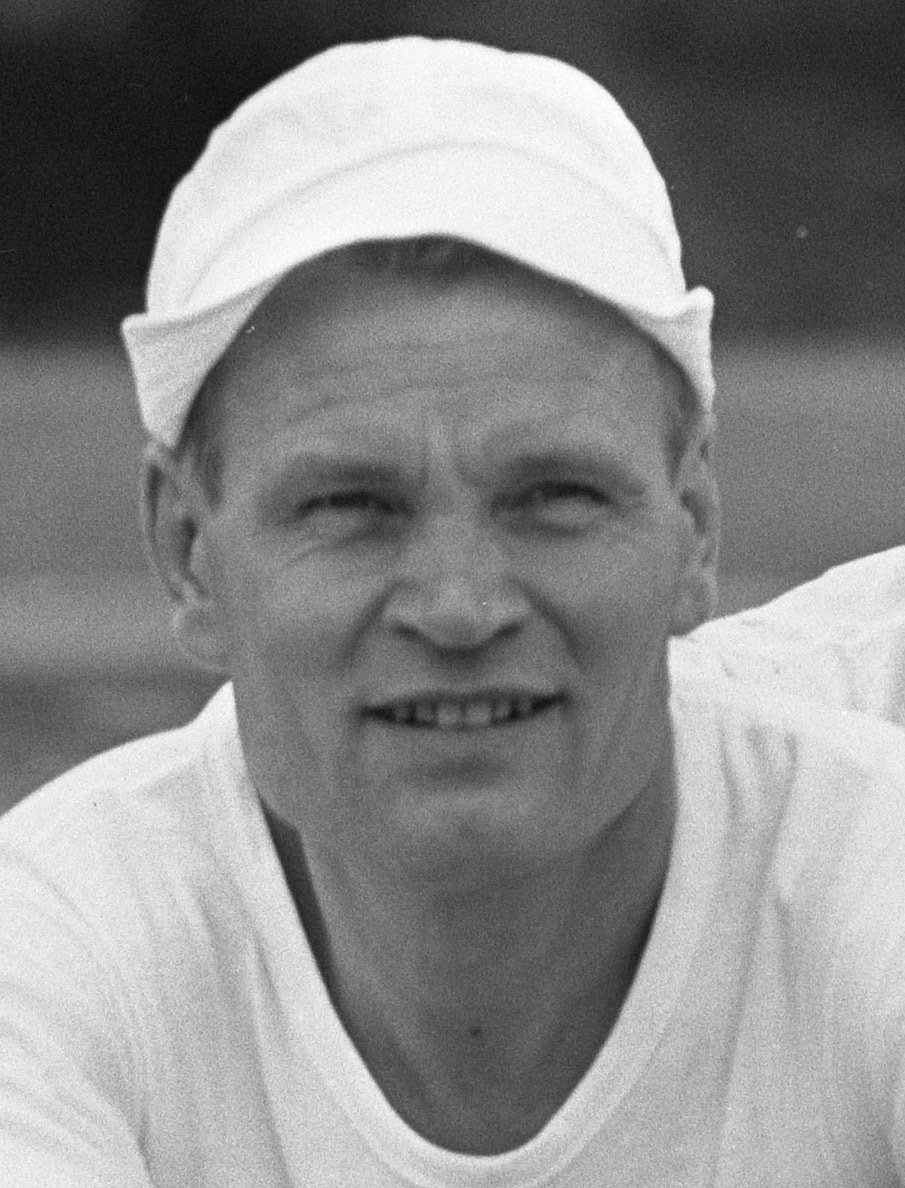
Lehtelä (left) & Pitkänen, the Finnish pair won in 1961

=== 2000 onwards ===
Year	Winning crew	Club	Distance	Runner-up	Club	ref
2000	Greg Searle; Ed Coode	Molesey Boat Club; Leander Club	7.32 1 3/4 L	Ramon di Clemente; Donovan Cech	Trident RC, RSA	
2001	James Cracknell; Matthew Pinsent	Leander Club	7.40 E	Peter Haining; Nick J. Strange	Auriol Kensington RC; Leander Club	
2002	James Cracknell; Matthew Pinsent	Leander Club	7.35 1/2 L	Ramon di Clemente; Donovan Cech	Trident RC, RSA	
2003	James Cracknell; Matthew Pinsent	Leander Club	7.05 1/3 L	Jason Read; Bryan Volpenhein	Princeton TC, USA	
2004	Ramon di Clemente; Donovan Cech	Trident RC, RSA	7.31 4 1/4 L	James Livingston; Rick Dunn	Molesey; Cambridge Univ BC	
2005	Ramon di Clemente; Donovan Cech	Tirednet RC, RSA	7.41 4 L	Scott Frandsen; Barney Williams	Oxford Univ BC	
2006	Paul Daniels; Barney Williams	Oxford Univ BC	7.31 2 3/4 L	Goran Jagar; Nikola Stojić	RC Partizan, Serbia & Montenegro	
2007	Ramon di Clemente; Donovan Cech	Trident RC, RSA	7.44 2 3/4 L	Andreas Penkner; Jochen Urban	Crefelder RC; Undine Radolfzell RS, GER	
2008	Shaun Keeling; Ramon di Clemente	Trident RC, RSA	7.47 4 3/4 L	Ole Rückbrodt; Felix Otto	Hamburger & Ger RC; RC Ger Dusseldorf von 1904	
2009	Eric Murray; Hamish Bond	Waiariki RC, NZL	7.31 E	Shaun Keeling; Ramon di Clemente	Trident RC, RSA	
2010	Eric Murray; Hamish Bond	Waiariki RC, NZL	7.55 E	Pete Reed; Andrew Triggs Hodge	Leander Club; Molesey	
2011	Pete Reed; Andrew Triggs Hodge	Leander Club; Molesey BC	6:56 E	Lorenzo Carboncini; Niccolò Mornati	Centro Nazionale di Canottaggio Piediluco, ITA	
2012	Michael Molina; Benjamin Lang	Sport Nautique Compiegnois; Emulation Nautique Bordeaux	8:22 E	Konstantinos Christomanos; Apostolos Lampridis	Volos & Nautical Club Ioannina, GRE	
2013	Eric Murray; Hamish Bond	Waiariki RC, NZL	6:56 E	David Hunt; Vincent Breet	Tuks Rowing Club, RSA	
2014	Julien Bahain; Mitchel Steenman	Hollandia Roeiclub, NED	7:19 2 L	Shaun Keeling; Vincent Breet	Tuks Rowing Club, RSA	
2015	James Foad; Matt Langridge	Molesey BC; Leander Club	7:39 5 L	Oliver Cook; Stewart Innes	Univ of London BC; Leander Club	
2016	Roel Braas; Mitchel Steenman	Hollandia Roeiclub, NED	7:35 3 3/4 L	Benoît Demey; Édouard Jonville	Aviron Grenoblois; Cercle Nautique d'Annecy, FRA	
2017	Valentin Onfroy; Théophile Onfroy	Club France	7.03 2L	Josh Dunkley-Smith; Josh Booth	Mercantile RC; Melbourne Univ, AUS	
2018	Martin Sinković; Valent Sinković	C.A.R.C. Mladost, CRO	6.54	Campbell Watts; Angus Widdicombe	Georgina Hope Rinehart NTC, AUS	
2019	Axel Haack; Agustin Diaz	Club de Regatas La Plata; Tigre Boat Club, ARG	7.16 4 3/4 L	Michiel Oyen; Mitchel Steenman	Hollandia Roeiclub, NED	
2020	No competition due to COVID-19 pandemic					
2021	Morgan Bolding; Matthew Tarrant	Oxford Brookes Univ	7.28 easily	Ollie Parish; Callum Sullivan	Cambridge Univ BC	
2022	Matt Macdonald; Tom Mackintosh	Waiariki RC, NZL	7.03 2/3 length	Oliver Wynne-Griffith; Thomas George	Cambridge Univ BC	
2023	Oliver Wynne-Griffith; Thomas George	Leander Club	7.36 1 1/2	Jack Walkey; Joel Cullen	Rowing Canada	
2024	Niki van Sprang; Guillaume Krommenhoek	Hollandia Roeiclub, NED	Easily	Rene Schmela; Theis Hagemeister	Berlin RC; Frankfurt RS Germany 1869	
2025	Ralf Rienks; Rik Rienks	Hollandia Roeiclub	7.19 1L	Marcus Chute; Theo Bell	Princeton University, USA	

==== Gallery ====
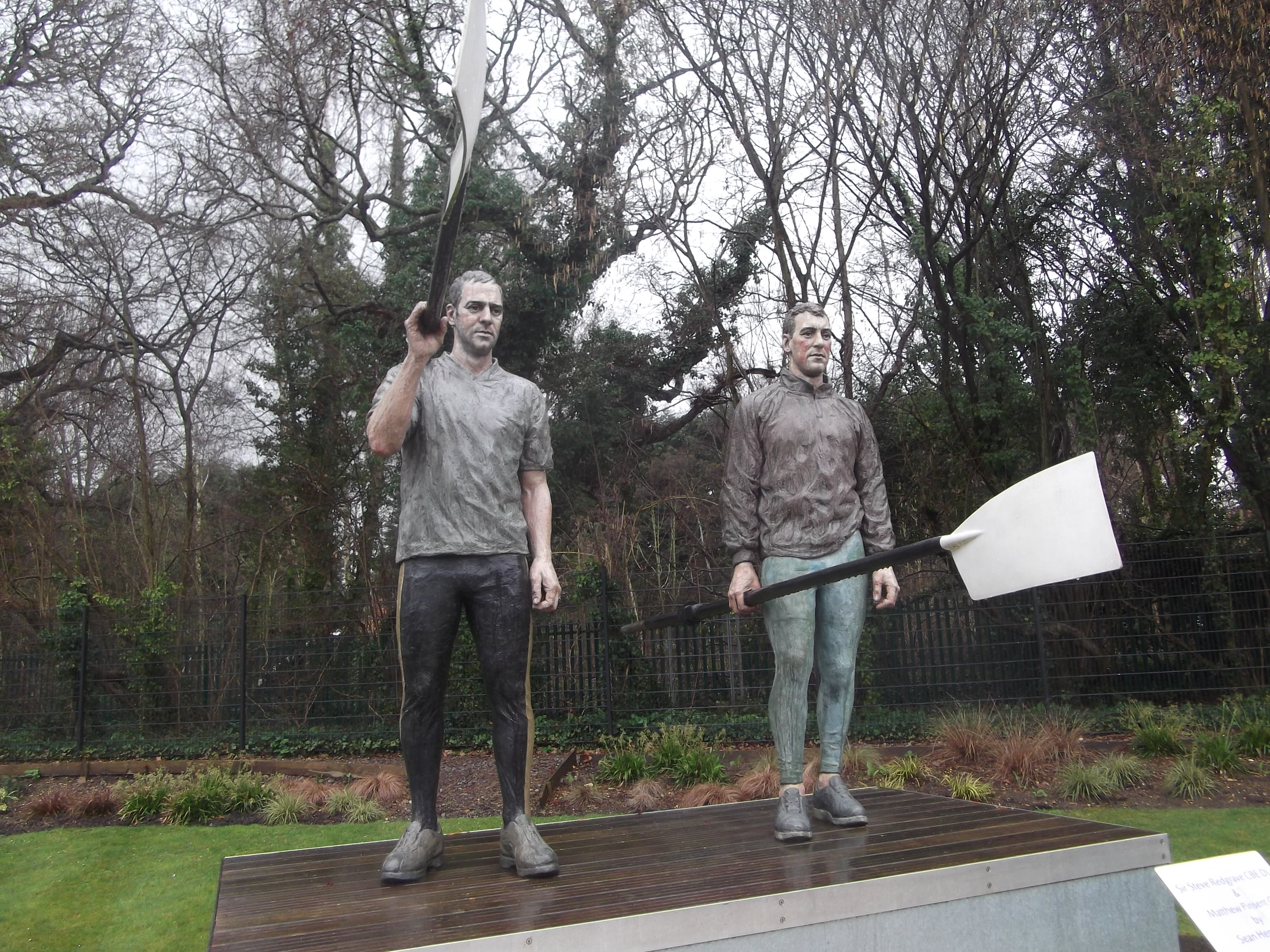
Statues of Sir Steven Redgrave and Sir Matthew Pinsent at the River and Rowing Museum, they each won 7 titles and 4 together.

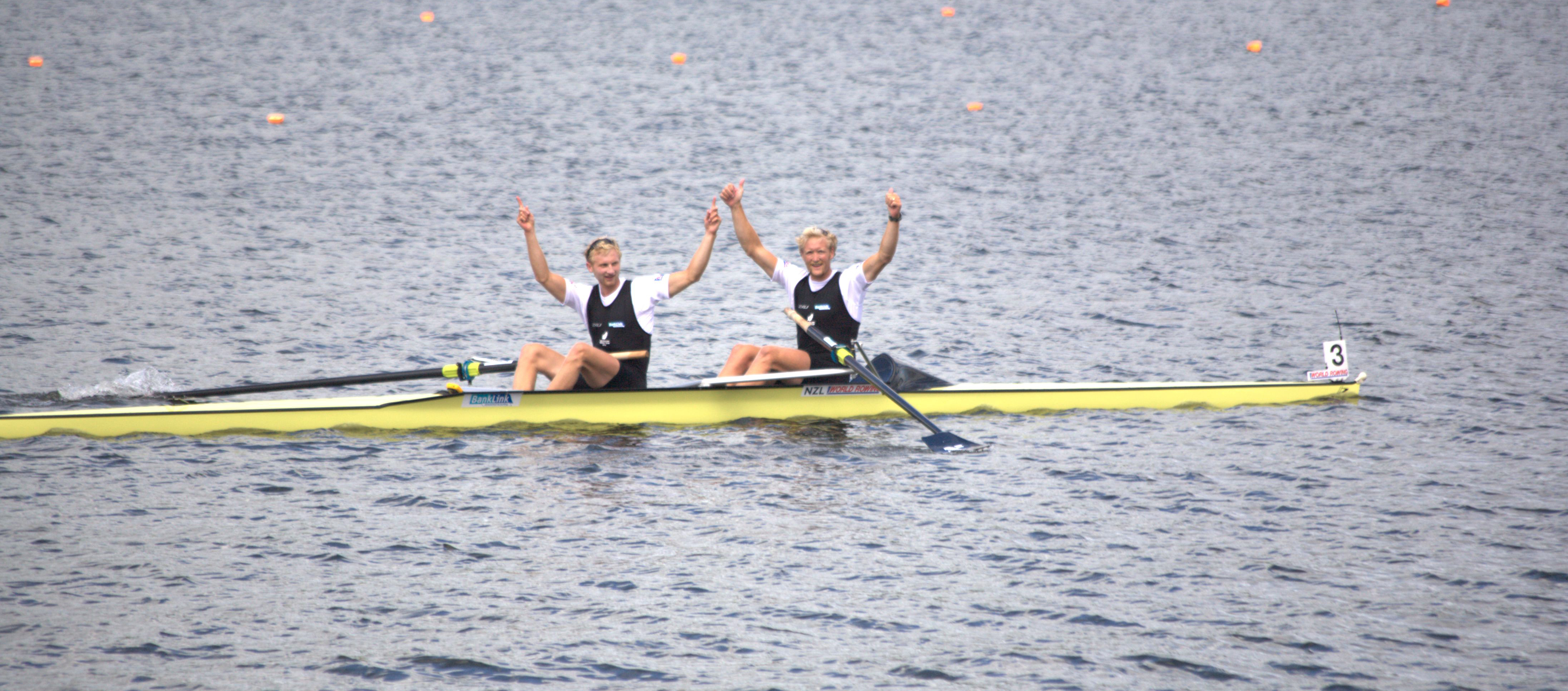
New Zealand pair Hamish Bond (left) and Derek Murray won the event three times.

== See also ==
- Rowing on the River Thames
