= Edric Hamilton-Russell =

British rower and engineer

Edric Claud Hamilton-Russell (24 November 1904 – 1984) was a British rower and mining engineer who was director of pre-nationalisation collieries.

Hamilton-Russell was the son of Hon. Claud Eustace Hamilton-Russell and Maria Lindsay Wood. He was educated at Eton College and at Trinity College, Cambridge. At Cambridge, he was a member of the Pitt Club. In 1925, rowing for Third Trinity, Cambridge, he won Silver Goblets at Henley Royal Regatta, partnering Robert Morrison. They beat Guy Oliver Nickalls and Richard Lucas in the final. In 1926 he was a member of the Cambridge crew in the Boat Race. He also won Silver Goblets again partnering H R Carver, when they beat Nickalls and A D B Pearson in the final.

Hamilton-Russell became a chartered surveyor and mining engineer. In 1940 he was general manager of Doncaster Amalgamated Collieries Ltd. and a director of the Netherton Coal Company of Newcastle. He lived at Badsworth Grange.

In 1950, after the Coal Industry Nationalisation Act 1946, he was a senior partner in William Armstrong & Sons of Newcastle upon Tyne who were consulting mining engineers and mineral valuers. He was mineral adviser to the Church Commissioners for England and chairman of the Netherton Coal Company. He was living at Acomb House, Hexham, Northumberland.

Hamilton-Russell died in 1984

Hamilton-Russell married Helen Rosa Humble, daughter of William Humble, on 11 April 1932.

== See also ==
- List of Cambridge University Boat Race crews
