= Barlee =

Barlee may refer to:

- Lake Barlee, an intermittent salt lake in Western Australia
- Bill Barlee (1932–2012), Canadian politician and television historian storyteller
- Frederick Barlee (1827–1884), Australian politician, Lieutenant-Governor of British Honduras (now Belize), and Administrator of Trinidad
- John Buckle Barlee (1831–1870), English rower
