= David Edward Brown =

British rower

David Edward Brown (born 1858) was a British rower who won several events at Henley Royal Regatta in the 1880s.

Brown was the son of David Brown of Llandaff Glamorgan. He matriculated at New College, Oxford in 1877 but migrated to Hertford College, Oxford. Brown was a successful rower at Oxford and was a member of the winning Oxford crew in the 1880 Boat Race. Also in 1880 he was a member of the Thames Rowing Club four which won the Stewards' Challenge Cup at Henley Royal Regatta. In 1881 he was in the winning Oxford crew again in that year's Boat Race, and won Stewards with Hertford College Boat Club. He won the 1882 Boat Race and the Stewards again in 1882 and also won Silver Goblets at Henley for Hertford paired with Jefferson Lowndes In 1883 he joined Twickenham Rowing Club together with his Hertford colleagues Lowndes, Edward Buck and George Quinlan Roberts who rowed in the final for the Grand Challenge Cup, but were beaten by London Rowing Club. However Brown and Roberts won Silver Goblets in 1883. In 1884 London beat the Twickenham crew in the Grand final gain, but Brown won Silver Goblets paired with Lowndes. The Twickenham eight lost the Grand final in 1885 to Jesus College, Cambridge.

== See also ==
- List of Oxford University Boat Race crews
