= George Quinlan Roberts =

Australian rower

George Quinlan Roberts CBE (23 February 1860 – 6 September 1943) was a Tasmanian-born rower who won events at Henley Royal Regatta in the 1880s. He later served as chief secretary of St Thomas' Hospital in London from 1903 to 1928.

== Early life and rowing ==
Roberts was born in Tasmania, the eldest son of George Valentine Roberts(1835-1909)of Hobart and his wife Elizabeth Benn (1841-1917). Elizabeth’s father, John Benn (97th Reg. Of Foot)was a military pensioner who came out to Tasmania in 1850 as a guard on a Convict ship,’Eliza’ with his wife and daughter. He was given 5 acres of land at Oatlands, Tasmania in return for 12 days service to the government each year. John Benn died of pulmonary consumption in 1855 and his daughter, Elizabeth came under the guardianship of Constable Michael Quinlan, as his adopted daughter. His father was a member of the Board of Education. George Valentine Roberts was a teacher at Oatlands and later became head teacher at the Queen’s Orphan School at St. John’s New Town, Hobart and later headmaster of Trinity Hill School and the Battery Point Model School before retiring in 1898 to grow fruit in Lenah Valley, Hobart. Roberts went to England where he entered Hertford College, Oxford in 1879 at the age of 19. At Oxford, he rowed for his college and was a member of the coxless four which won the Stewards' Challenge Cup at Henley in 1881 and 1882. He was a member of the winning Oxford crew in the 1883 Boat Race. With several of his Hertford friends, Roberts then rowed for Twickenham Rowing Club. In 1883 for Twickenham he partnered D E Brown to win the Silver Goblets at Henley beating James Hastie and H B Tween in the final.

== Hospital administration ==
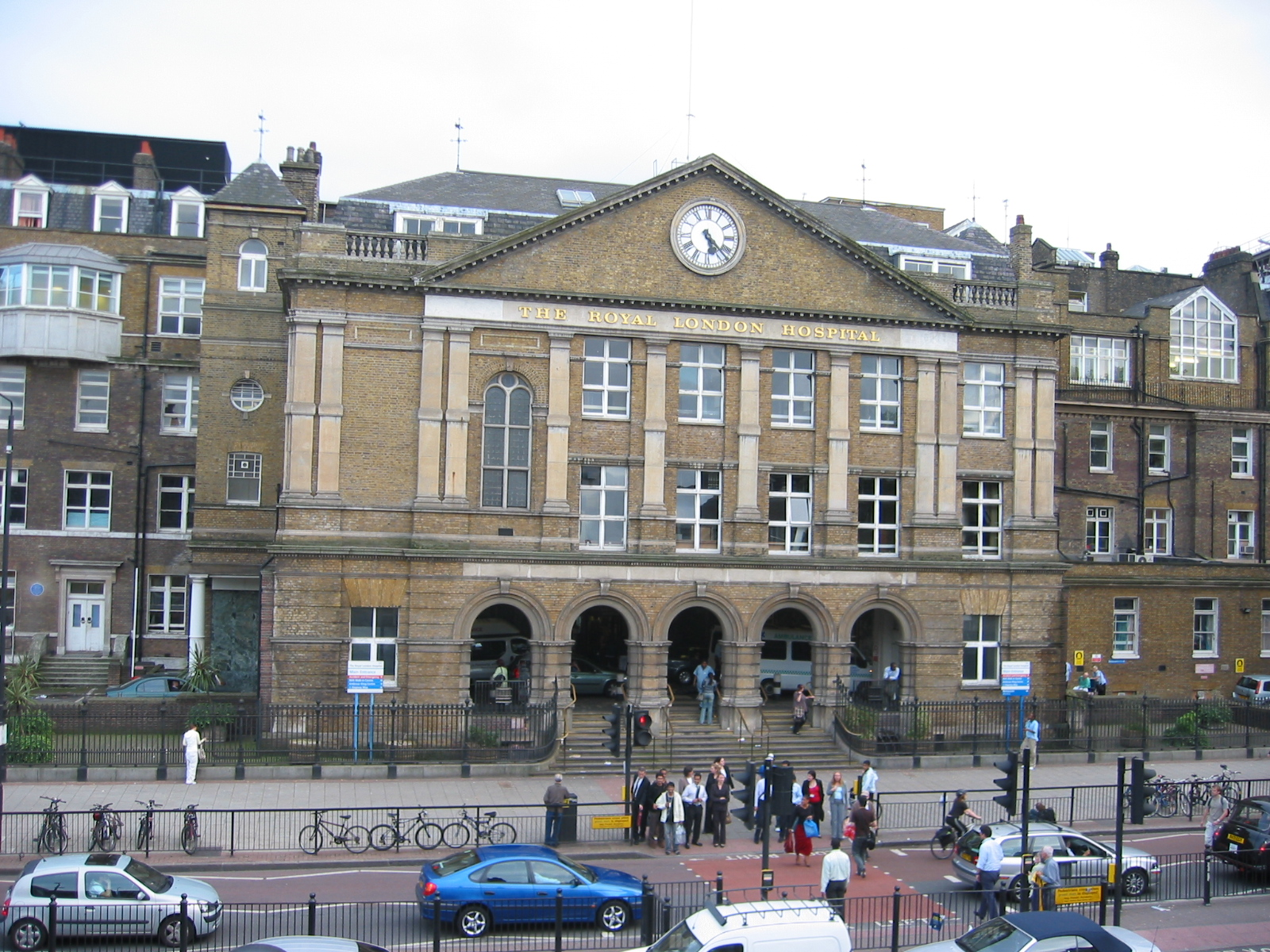
Facade of The Royal London Hospital

After Oxford, Roberts went into hospital administration. In 1892 he was appointed house-governor of The London Hospital and over the years trained the rowing crews of the London Hospital. By 1903, he was secretary at St Thomas' Hospital. He was appointed a Commander of the Order of the British Empire in the 1919 New Year Honours for his efforts during the First World War.

In 1920, he published a brief history of St Thomas' Hospital. Roberts belonged to the Worshipful Company of Pattenmakers and was appointed master in 1926.

== Family and later life ==
Roberts married Mary Waters at Kingston upon Thames in 1891. They had two sons, one of whom was killed in the First World War.

He retired in 1928. He was widowed in 1935 and died in Oxford in 1943.

== See also ==
- List of Oxford University Boat Race crews
