= The Boat Race 1882 =

39th Boat Race
- Date: 1 April 1882
- Winner: Oxford
- Margin of victory: 7 lengths
- Winning time: 20 minutes 12 seconds
- Overall record (Cambridge–Oxford): 17–21
- Umpire: Robert Lewis-Lloyd (Cambridge)

The 39th Boat Race took place on 1 April 1882. The Boat Race is an annual side-by-side rowing race between crews from the Universities of Oxford and Cambridge along the River Thames. In the race, umpired by former Cambridge rower Robert Lewis-Lloyd, Oxford won by a margin of seven lengths in a time of 20 minutes 12 seconds, taking the overall record to 21–17 in their favour.

== Background ==
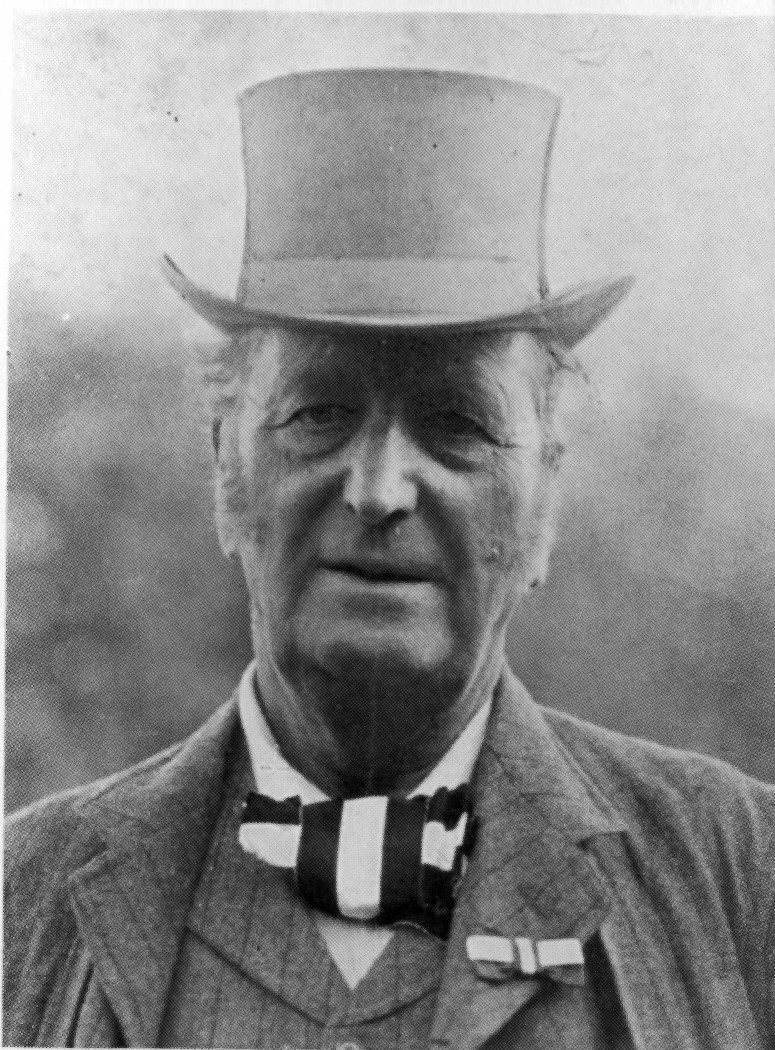
Walter Bradford Woodgate coached Oxford for the sixth time.

The Boat Race is an annual rowing eight competition between the University of Oxford and the University of Cambridge. First held in 1829, the competition is a 4.2-mile (6.8 km) race along The Championship Course on the River Thames in southwest London. The rivalry is a major point of honour between the two universities and followed throughout the United Kingdom and worldwide. Oxford went into the race as reigning champions, having won the previous year's race by three lengths, and held the overall lead, with 20 victories to Cambridge's 17 (excluding the "dead heat" of 1877).

Oxford were coached by Tom Edwards-Moss (who rowed for the Dark Blues four times between the 1875 and 1878 race) and Walter Bradford Woodgate (who represented Oxford in the 1862 and 1863 races). There is no record of Cambridge's coaches. The Oxford boat was manufactured by Swaddle and Winship and was used in preference to one built by Harry Clasper which had been tested extensively in practice. The umpire for the race was Robert Lewis-Lloyd (who had rowed for Cambridge four times between 1856 and 1859) and the starter was Edward Searle.

== Crews ==
The Oxford crew weighed an average of 11 st 11.125 lb (74.7 kg), 0.125 pounds (0.1 kg) more than their opponents. Cambridge saw five former Blues return, including Llewellyn Rhys Jones whose poor health had prevented him from rowing since the 1878 race. The Light Blue crew also included the only non-British competitor in the race in Australian Steve Fairbairn (whose brother Charles had competed in the 1879 race). Oxford's crew also contained five individuals with Boat Race experience, including R. S. Kindersley and David Edward Brown, both of whom were rowing in their third race.

Seat	Oxford			Cambridge		
Seat	Name	College	Weight	Name	College	Weight
Bow	G. C. Bourne	New College	10 st 13 lb	Ll. R. Jones	Jesus	10 st 13.5 lb
2	R. S. de Haviland	Corpus Christi	11 st 1.5 lb	A. M. Hutchinson	Jesus	11 st 6.75 lb
3	G. S. Fort	Hertford	12 st 3.5 lb	J. C. Fellowes	1st Trinity	12 st 3.5 lb
4	A. R. Paterson (P)	Trinity	12 st 12 lb	P. W. Atkin	Jesus	11 st 3 lb
5	R. S. Kindersley	Exeter	13 st 4.5 lb	E. Lambert (P)	Pembroke	11 st 10.5 lb
6	E. Buck	Hertford	12 st 0 lb	S. Fairbairn	Jesus	12 st 3 lb
7	D. E. Brown	Hertford	12 st 6 lb	C. W. Moore	Christ's	11 st 6.5 lb
Stroke	A. H. Higgins	Magdalen	9 st 6.5 lb	S. P. Smith	1st Trinity	11 st 0.5 lb
Cox	E. H. Lyon	Hertford	7 st 12 lb	P. L. Hunt	Cavendish	7 st 5 lb
Source: (P) – boat club president

== Race ==
The Championship Course, along which the race is conducted

Oxford were firm pre-race favourites, having rowed the course twenty seconds quicker than Cambridge in practice. Cambridge won the toss and elected to start from the Middlesex station, handing the Surrey side of the river to Oxford. The race commenced at 1:02 p.m. in conditions described by author and former Oxford rower George Drinkwater as "fine and warm" with a "breeze from the north-west". Cambridge made the better start, taking a lead of a canvas length, but were in front for less than a minute. Oxford took the lead and were clear of the Light Blues by the Mile Post and held a three-length lead at Hammersmith Bridge. Cambridge encountered choppy water and, according to Drinkwater, "fell to pieces". Oxford drew away to win by seven lengths in a time of 20 minutes 12 seconds. It was Oxford's third consecutive win and the fastest winning time since the 1873 race. The result took the overall record to 21–17 in their favour.
