= Twickenham Rowing Club =

British rowing club

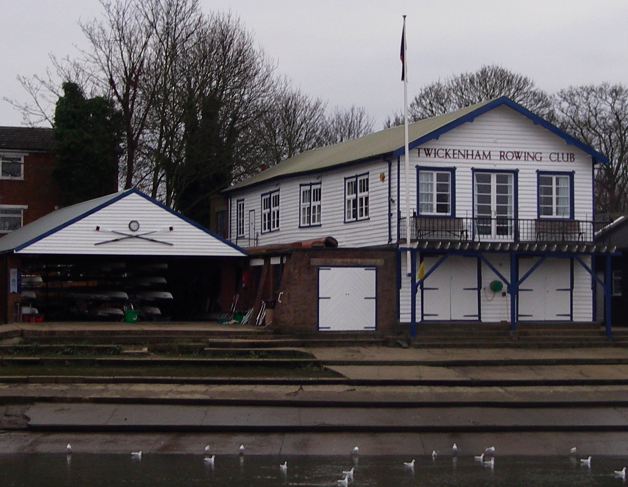

- Location: Eel Pie Island, Twickenham, London, England
- Coordinates: 51°26′44.1″N 0°19′31.6″W
- Home water: Tideway
- Founded: 1860
- Affiliations: British Rowing boat code - TWK
- Website: www.twickenhamrc.co.uk

Events
- Twickenham Regatta

Notable members
- Henri, Duc D'Aumale (b.1822); Jefferson Lowndes (b.1858); David E Brown (b.1858); George Q Roberts (b.1860); Hugh Comyn (b.1876); Grp. Capt. Edward Howe Verity (1901–1984); Dame Diana ("Di") Ellis (1938–2017); Sir Giles Cockburn (b.1950); Robert E. Lerwill (b. 1952); Callum Dixon (b. 2000)

Twickenham Rowing Club was founded on 26 July 1860 so is jointly with Thames Rowing Club the third oldest rowing club on the Thames. The club is on Eel Pie Island in Twickenham, south-west London. Its boat code is TWK.

== Club colours ==
The club colours are quite dark blue with either magenta bands or in recent decades a single wide such band to split the blade into thirds (blades are usually arranged normally fesswise). An official source simply specifies the first colour as "blue" and its shade has varied slightly over generations.

== History ==
Henri, Duc D'Aumale (the fifth son of the exiled king of France, Louis Philippe I, who lived at York House in Twickenham) helped to found the club and was its first President from 1860 to 1897. The freehold to the land on which the clubhouse stands was donated to the rowing club in 1876, by HRH Le Comte de Paris, 'King' Philippe VII (1838–1894), Louis Philippe I's grandson and the pretender to the disbanded French throne. The latter's son, Philippe VIII, Duc D'Orleans (1869–1926) became the club's second President from 1898 to 1899.

=== Construction and facilities ===
The first boathouse was built in 1861/62 as a floating structure and was moored at some point off Twickenham Ait which became known as Eel Pie Island. The boathouse cost £295, a large sum as fully paid for out of ordinary income, by 1866. (Note: equivalent to £30,360 in 2025.)

For a few years the reading room of Twickenham Literary Society was shared as the meeting-up point from 1864.

The floating boathouse remained for several years despite sinking on a couple of occasions. When the club became owners of the current site the boathouse was put ashore and finally sold in 1882/83 for a nominal £32. The Thames Conservancy provided the ballast to raise the ground level where it rested.

By March 1866 the boathouse contained:

- 1 Cutler eight,
- 2 Gig eights,
- 2 Cutler fours,
- 2 Gig fours,
- 1 Skiff and
- 1 Punt.

In 1889 it was proposed by the club and others using the island to build a bridge to the island. The island's first bridge was built in 1957.

== Accolades ==
The Club is one of the founding members of The Remenham Club, a social and event-celebratory club with an enclosure at Henley Royal Regatta.

Aside from notable national oarsmen and women mentioned top right, Twickenham have won:

- A few trophies at the Head of the River Race since 1926.
- The novice club pennant (as winners) at the Women's Eights Head of the River Race in 1999
- A small number of events in various years at the Fours head
- A small number of events at the Pairs head
- At Henley Royal Regatta:
  - Three times at the Silver Goblets (these involved Jefferson Lowndes in the 19th century)
  - The club won the Thames Challenge Cup in 1879, 1881 and 1884 and was runner-up in 1880, 1911, 1924, 1927 and 1928. The club's top eight reached the quarter-finals in 2014.
- Winner of the 1980 British Rowing Championships, Men J16 2x composite

== St George's Ladies Rowing Club ==
The St George's Ladies Rowing Club was merged into the Twickenham Club in 1979. The club had existed for 55 years and won three British Rowing Championships in 1972, 1975 and 1977.

== See also ==
- Rowing on the River Thames

== Notes and references ==
Notes
