= St George's Club =

The St George's Club was an English rowing club based on the Tideway of the River Thames that competed in the middle of the 19th century.

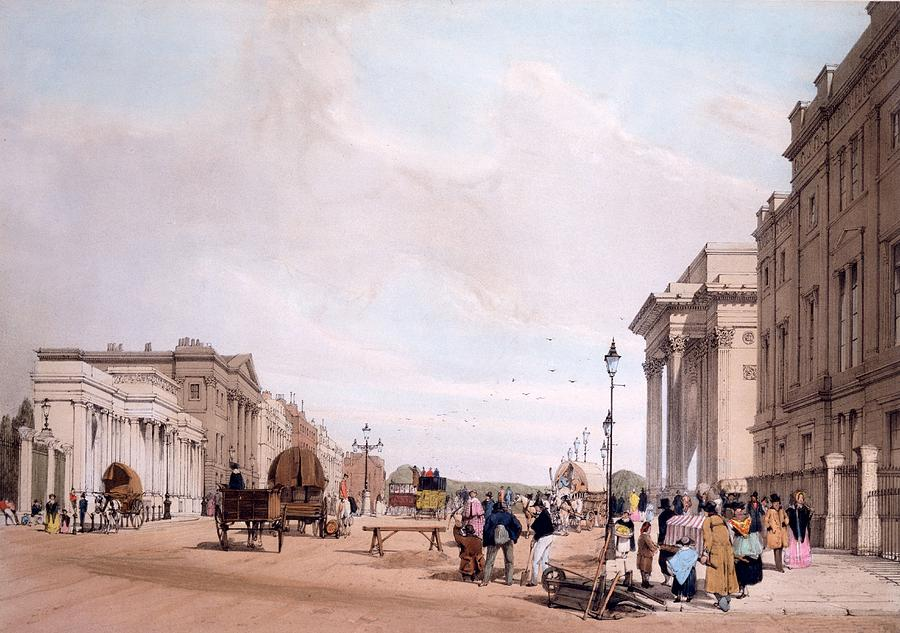
Hyde Park Corner in 1842, looking east with the St George's Hospital building on the right.

The St George's Club included members who were receiving a medical education at St George's Hospital at Hyde Park Corner. It was active in the 1840s and entered coxed four events at Henley Royal Regatta. The St George's boat came third in the Stewards' Challenge Cup in 1841 but won the event in 1843 with the crew of G. Jeffreys, J. Hodding, G. Collier, T. B. Bumpstead (stroke) and A. Johnson (cox). The club were runners up to Oxford University Boat Club in the competition in 1844. Also in 1844 Thomas Bumpsted won the Wingfield Sculls and the Diamond Challenge Sculls although he entered the latter for Scullers Club. In 1845 at Henley St George's won the New Challenge Cup which was the precursor to the Ladies' Challenge Plate and were runners up to OUBC in the Stewards' again. In 1847 at Henley St George's were runners up in the Visitors' Challenge Cup to Christ Church, Oxford. In the same regatta William Falls and W Coulthard rowing for St George's won the Silver Wherries beating T Pollock and T H Fellows of Leander Club in the final.

St George's was one of several clubs on the Tideway including Wandle Club, Argonaut Club, Thames Club, Meteor Club and Petrel Club. In 1856 there was a move to combine these clubs into a single club that could compete successfully against the Oxford and Cambridge crews at Henley in the four and eights. To achieve this, the London Rowing Club was formed.
