= Terence Sanders =

British rower, army officer, and lecturer

Medal record

Men's rowing

Representing Great Britain

Olympic Games
Gold medal – first place	1924 Paris	Coxless four

Terence Robert Beaumont Sanders (2 June 1901 – 6 April 1985) was a British rower who competed in the 1924 Summer Olympics, a lecturer in engineering at Cambridge, an army officer engaged in countering the V2 threat, civil servant and High Sheriff of Surrey.

== Biography ==
Sanders was born in Charleville, Cork, Ireland. He was educated at Eton and Trinity College, Cambridge. At Cambridge, Sanders, Maxwell Eley, Robert Morrison and James MacNabb, who had rowed together at Eton, made up the coxless four that in 1922 at Henley won the Stewards' Challenge Cup as Eton Vikings and the Visitors' Challenge Cup as Third Trinity Boat Club Sanders stroked the Cambridge in the Boat Race in 1923 which was won by Oxford. The coxless four won the Stewards' Challenge Cup at Henley again in 1923 crew won Steward's at Henley again in 1924 and went on to win the gold medal for Great Britain rowing at the 1924 Summer Olympics.

In 1925 Sanders became a Fellow of Corpus Christi College, Cambridge and lectured in engineering. He was active in the Territorial Army at the university. He also served as honorary treasurer of the University Boat Club from 1928 to 1939. With G.C. Drinkwater he produced The University Boat Race: Official. Centenary History 1829–1929 in 1929. He was in the Leander Club eight that won the Grand Challenge Cup at Henley in 1929.

In 1936 Sanders was appointed University lecturer in engineering. He was a Member of the Institute of Civil Engineers and the Institute of Mechanical Engineers.

Sanders joined the Ministry of Supply in 1941 and in 1946 he was appointed Principal Director of Technical Development (Defense). Maintaining his army role, he was active in Operation Crossbow which was concerned with the threat of V2 rockets. In November 1944, the "Sanders mission" led by Colonel T. R. B. Sanders inspected the site at La Coupole.- Later he was Assistant Controller of Supplies at the Ministry of Supply. He was awarded the CB in 1950. He left the Army the following year with the rank of colonel. He later became Chairman of the Buckland Sand and Silica Co. and in 1967 he was appointed High Sheriff of Surrey and Deputy Lieutenant of the County of Surrey.

Sanders died at Dorking, Surrey at the age of 83.

== Publications ==
- The University Boat Race: Official. Centenary History 1829–1929 London, 1929 with G.C. Drinkwater
- The aims and principles of standardization 1972, International Organization for Standardization ([Geneva])

== See also ==
- List of Cambridge University Boat Race crews

Honorary titles
Preceded by Henry Dumas	High Sheriff of Surrey; 1967	Succeeded by Jack Master
