= James Paine (rower) =

English rower

James Paine was an English rower who competed in the 19th century and won the Wingfield Sculls and events at Henley Royal Regatta.

Paine lived in London and rowed initially as a member of the Argonaut Club. In 1853 he won the Wingfield Sculls, the amateur championship of the River Thames, against Stephen Rippingall and Josias Nottidge.

In 1856 Paine became one of the early members of London Rowing Club when it was formed from a number of existing clubs on the Tideway. However being newly founded, the club was ineligible to enter Henley Royal Regatta in 1856 so its members competed as members of the Argonaut Club. Paine was in a coxed four with Nottidge, A. A. Casamajor and Herbert Playford which won the Stewards' Challenge Cup. He also partnered Playford in the Silver Goblets in which they were runners-up to Nottidge and Casamajor. In 1857 the London Rowing Club competed and won the Grand Challenge Cup and the Stewards' Cup again with Paine in the crews. Paine partnered Casamajor in the Silver Goblets in 1859 when they were runners up to Edmond Warre and John Arkell.
