= Arthur Heywood-Lonsdale =

Arthur Pemberton Heywood-Lonsdale (9 January 1835 – 24 February 1897) was an English rower and landowner who was High Sheriff of two counties and a substantial investor in North Vancouver.

== Early life ==
Lonsdale was the son of Rev. Henry Gylby Lonsdale and his wife Anna Maria Heywood. He was the nephew of John Lonsdale, Bishop of Lichfield. Lonsdale was educated at Eton College and Balliol College, Oxford, where he graduated as B.A. in 1858.

He rowed at Oxford and was in the Oxford crew in the Boat Race in 1856 and 1857. In 1857, Lonsdale also partnered Edmond Warre in a coxless pair to win Silver Goblets at Henley Royal Regatta. In 1858 the pair lost in the final of Silver Goblets to Herbert Playford and A. A. Casamajor. Lonsdale studied law at Lincoln's Inn, where he was called to the Bar in 1862.

== Career ==
He became High Sheriff of Louth in 1877. He was granted a Royal Licence to change his name to Arthur Pemberton Heywood-Lonsdale in order to inherit a fortune of a million and a quarter pounds under the will of his maternal uncle John Pemberton Heywood who died in 1877. Enriched by his inheritance, from 1878, he leased a townhouse in Grosvenor Square, Mayfair. In 1880 he served as treasurer of the Salop Infirmary in Shrewsbury.

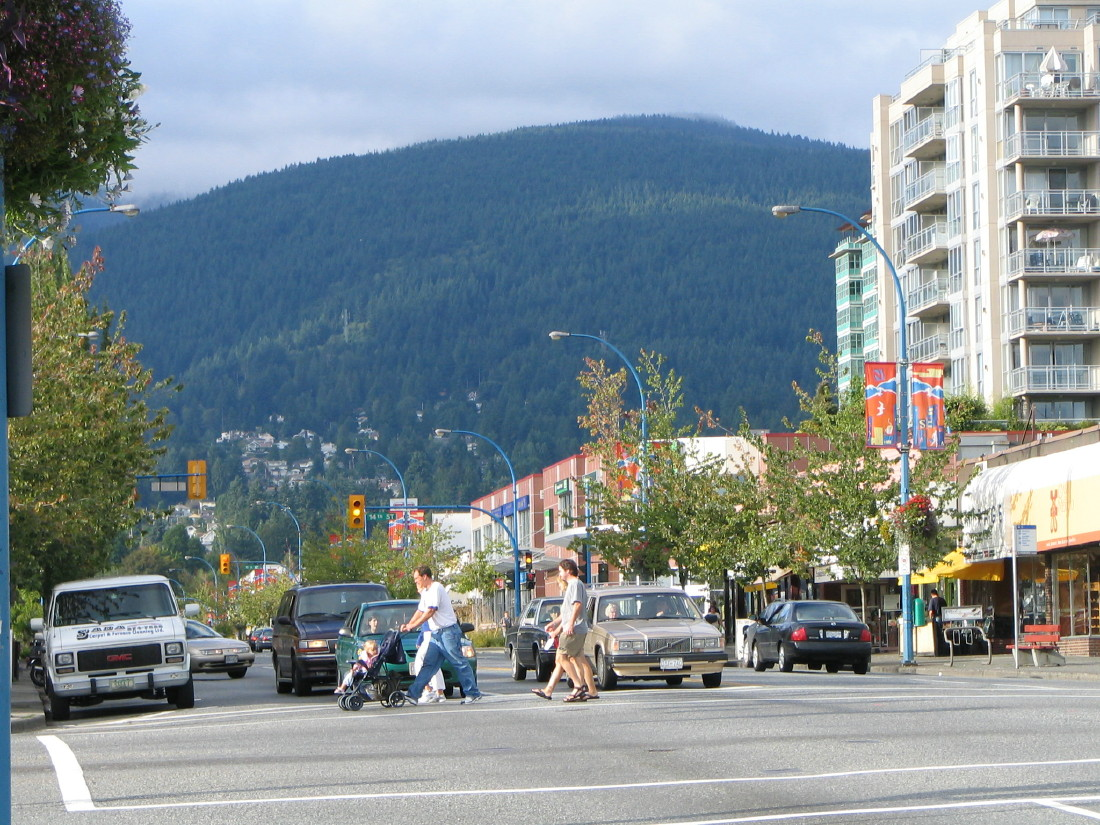
Lonsdale Avenue – Main thoroughfare of North Vancouver

With another relation James Pemberton Fell, Heywood-Lonsdale made substantial investments in the City of North Vancouver. In 1882 he financed the Moodyville investments founded by Sewell Moody. Several locations in the North Vancouver area are named after Lonsdale and the family.

In 1885 Heywood-Lonsdale purchased the Shavington estate in Shropshire and greatly improved the house and grounds. He became High Sheriff of Shropshire in 1888 After the formation of Shropshire County Council in 1889 he served on it as an alderman and as its vice chairman.

== Marriage and family ==
Lonsdale married, in Ackworth Church on 28 January 1863, Frances Elizabeth Neilson, of Hundhill. His uncle, the Bishop of Lichfield, officiated.

Arthur died in February 1897 aged 62, his widow died at Cloverley, Whitchurch, Shropshire, on 14 April 1902, aged 59.

Their son Henry Heywood-Lonsdale inherited the estate. Another son John Heywood-Lonsdale coxed Oxford in the Boat Race from 1889 to 1892.

His great-granddaughter Amanda Heywood-Lonsdale is the Duchess of Devonshire, married to Peregrine Cavendish, 12th Duke of Devonshire.

== See also ==
- List of Oxford University Boat Race crews

Honorary titles
Preceded by Sir Offley Wakeman, 3rd Baronet	High Sheriff of Shropshire; 1888	Succeeded by John Tayleur, of Buntingsdale, Market Drayton
