= Tom Christie (rower) =

British doctor and rower

Personal information
- Nationality: British (English)
- Born: 26 March 1927
- Died: 11 October 2017 (aged 90)

Sport
- Sport: Rowing
- Club: RAF RC; Thames Rowing Club
Medal record
Men's rowing
Representing England
Commonwealth Games
Silver medal – second place	1954 Vancouver	Coxless pairs

Thomas Hildred Christie (26 March 1927 – 11 October 2017) was a doctor and rower who represented Great Britain rowing at the 1948 Summer Olympics and twice won Silver Goblets at Henley Royal Regatta.

== Biography ==
Christie trained as a doctor at King's College, and was a member of Thames Rowing Club. In the 1948 Summer Olympics in London, he was a member of the coxless fours crew. In 1949 he won the Silver Goblets at Henley, partnering Tony Butcher. He also won the Wyfold in 1946 for King's College London, and the Grand and the Stewards in 1948 for Thames Rowing Club.

Christie qualified as a doctor in 1950 and spent time at Westminster Hospital and St Thomas' Hospital training in anaesthetics. He won Silver Goblets at Henley again in 1952 representing Westminster Hospital and partnering H C I Baywater.

He represented the English team at the 1954 British Empire and Commonwealth Games held in Vancouver, Canada, where he won the silver medal in the coxless pairs event, partnering Nicholas Clack.

Christie was a consultant in Brighton and was involved with obstetric anaesthesia and open-heart surgery in its early days.
