= Robert Morrison (rower) =

British rower

Olympic medal record

Men's rowing

Representing Great Britain
Gold medal – first place	1924 Paris	Coxless four

Robert Erskine Morrison (26 March 1902 – 19 February 1980) was a British rower who competed in the 1924 Summer Olympics.

Morrison was born at Richmond on Thames, and he was educated at Eton College and at Trinity College, Cambridge, where he was a member of the Pitt Club. At Cambridge, Morrison, James MacNabb, Maxwell Eley and Terence Sanders, who had rowed together at Eton, made up the coxless four that in 1922 at Henley won the Stewards' Challenge Cup as Eton Vikings and the Visitors' Challenge Cup as Third Trinity Boat Club. Morrison rowed for Cambridge in the Boat Race in 1923 and was again in the winning crew for the Stewards' Challenge Cup The coxless four crew won Steward's at Henley again in 1924 and went on to win the gold medal for Great Britain rowing at the 1924 Summer Olympics. In 1925 at Henley Morrison won the Stewards's Challenge Cup, the Visitors' Challenge Cup and the Silver Goblets partnering Edric Hamilton-Russell.

Morrison became an engineer and worked around the country until he retired to Longstanton, Cambridgeshire in 1976.

== See also ==
- List of Cambridge University Boat Race crews
