= James MacNabb =

British rower

Personal information
- Born: 26 December 1901
- Died: 6 April 1990 (aged 88)
Medal record
Men's rowing
Representing Great Britain
Olympic Games
Gold medal – first place	1924 Paris	Coxless four

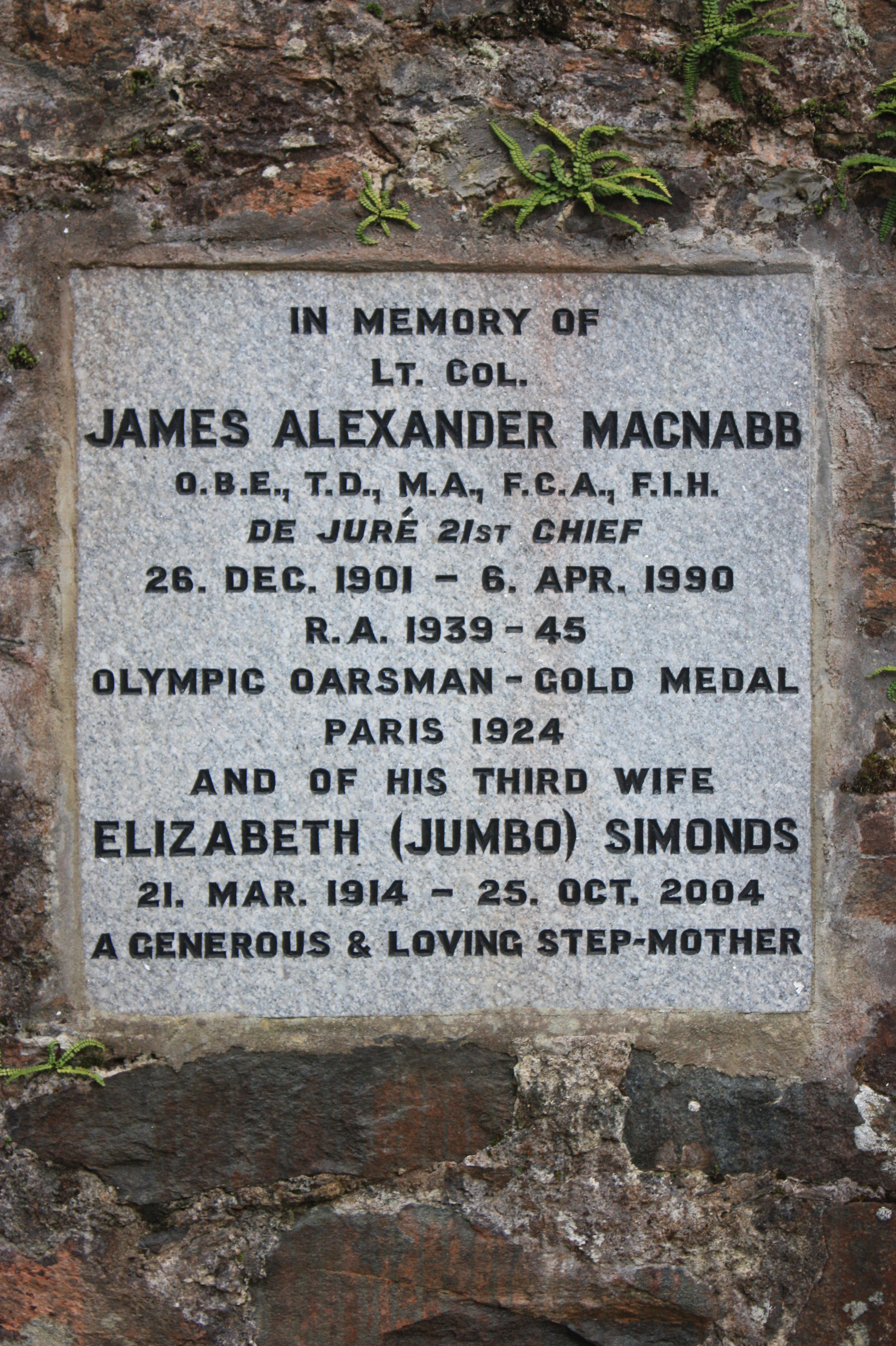
Memorial to James Alexander MacNabb, Old MacNabb Burial Ground, Killin

James Alexander MacNabb (26 December 1901 – 6 April 1990) was a British rower who competed in the 1924 Summer Olympics. He was the de jure 21st Chief of Clan Macnab.

MacNabb was born at Keighley, West Yorkshire, the son of Rev. James Frederick MacNabb, and his wife Margaret Elizabeth Waterworth. He was educated at Eton and first rowed at Henley in 1920 as a member of the Eton Crew that reached the semi-finals of the Ladies' Challenge Plate. He then went to Trinity College, Cambridge. At Cambridge, MacNabb, Maxwell Eley, Robert Morrison and Terence Sanders, who had rowed together at Eton, made up the coxless four that in 1922 at Henley won the Stewards' Challenge Cup as Eton Vikings and the Visitors' Challenge Cup as Third Trinity Boat Club. They won the Stewards' Challenge Cup again in 1923. MacNabb rowed for Cambridge in the Boat Race in 1924, and also won Silver Goblets at Henley in 1924 partnering Maxwell Eley. The coxless four crew won Stewards' at Henley again in 1924 and went on to win the gold medal for Great Britain rowing at the 1924 Summer Olympics.

MacNabb qualified as an accountant. He was associated with charitable housing for many years and was honorary treasurer at the Amateur Rowing Association for 20 years. He was also honorary secretary and treasurer of Leander Club and a steward of Henley Regatta. He coached the winning Cambridge crew from 1931 to 1933.

MacNabb served in World War II in the Royal Artillery in West Africa and Burma. He attained the rank of lieutenant colonel and was awarded the T.D. He coached the Oxford crew from 1949 to 1951, making him one of the few people to have coached both universities. In 1972 he was awarded the O.B.E for his work with the Peabody Trust.

== Personal life ==
MacNabb was married three times: to Ursula Barnett in 1925; to Pauline Mary Beatrice Shears, daughter of Philip James Shears, in 1938; and to Elizabeth Anne Simonds in 1958. His son James (1926−2013) became the 23rd Chief of Clan Macnab.

== See also ==
- List of Cambridge University Boat Race crews
