= Edward Corrie (rower) =

English rower

Edward Lyall Corrie (January 1848 - 1931) was an English rower who won Silver Goblets at Henley Royal Regatta three times.

Corrie was born in Liverpool, the son of Edgar Corrie, a merchant, and his wife Helen.

Corrie moved to London where he became a discount broker. He rowed for Kingston Rowing Club where he was coached by Walter Bradford Woodgate. In 1866, he partnered Woodgate to win Silver Goblets at Henley Royal Regatta. This was the infamous occasion when Woodgate entered the event twice, using the name Wat Bradford in the other entry when he partnered another Kingstonian M M Brown. The rules of entry at the regatta were subsequently revised to prevent this. Corrie partnered M M Brown in 1867 to win Silver Goblets again. In 1870 Corrie partnered E Hall for his third win of SIlver Goblets. He was captain of Kingston in 1872 when he was party to the revision of the laws of Boat Racing.

Corrie died at Reigate at the age of 83.

Corrie married Julia Sophia Hammond at St George Hanover Square in 1872.
