= Maxwell Eley =

British rower (1902–1983)

Olympic medal record

Men's rowing
Gold medal – first place	1924 Paris	Coxless four

Charles Ryves Maxwell Eley OBE (16 September 1902 – 15 January 1983) was a British rower who competed in the 1924 Summer Olympics, winning a gold medal with the British coxless four.

== Family ==
Eley was born in Samford, Suffolk, the eldest of four sons of Charles Cuthbert Eley, a barrister and noted gardener, and Ethel Maxwell Ryves. His great-grandfather co-founded the Eley Brothers company. Maxwell was the older brother of banker Sir Geoffrey Eley.

== Education and rowing ==
Eley was educated at Eton College and first rowed at Henley Royal Regatta in 1921, when Eton won the Ladies' Challenge Plate. He then went to Trinity College, Cambridge. At Cambridge, Eley, James MacNabb, Robert Morrison and Terence Sanders, who had rowed together at Eton, made up the coxless four that in 1922 at Henley won the Stewards' Challenge Cup as Eton Vikings and the Visitors' Challenge Cup as Third Trinity Boat Club. They won the Stewards' Challenge Cup again in 1923. Eley rowed for Cambridge in the Boat Race in 1924 and also won Silver Goblets at Henley in 1924 partnering James MacNabb.

The coxless four crew won Steward's at Henley again in 1924 and went on to win the gold medal for Great Britain at the 1924 Summer Olympics.

== Later life ==
Eley was with Imperial Chemical Industries. During World War II he was Deputy Controller of Industrial Ammonia Supplies at the Ministry of Supply from 1940 to 1945. After the war he was Director of Nitrogen Supplies at the Board of Trade from 1946 to 1947. He was on the Central Agricultural Control Committee and received the O.B.E in the 1949 New Year Honours.

Eley lived at East Bergholt Place, East Bergholt, Suffolk where he developed the impressive grounds and arboretum that his father had created into one of the finest private gardens in England. His son Robert was the husband of Bridget Cracroft-Eley.

== See also ==
- List of Cambridge University Boat Race crews
