= Tony Butcher =

English rower (1926–2009)

Personal information
- Nationality: British (English)
- Born: 1 June 1926 Hackney, London, England
- Died: 20 August 2009 (aged 85)

Sport
- Sport: Rowing
- Club: Thames Rowing Club
Medal record
Men's rowing
British Empire Games
Representing England
| Bronze medal – third place | 1950 Auckland | eights |

Anthony Sidney Fairbank Butcher (1 June 1926 – 20 August 2009) was an English rower who competed for Great Britain in the 1948 Olympic Games and won Silver Goblets at Henley Royal Regatta.

== Biography ==
Butcher was educated at Cambridge University and rowed for Cambridge in the Boat Race in 1947. He became a member of Thames Rowing Club. He competed at the 1948 Summer Olympics in the coxless fours. Butcher recalled that at these post-war austerity Olympics, his kit was made by his mother from terry towelling.

In 1949 he won the Silver Goblets at Henley, partnering Tom Christie.

He represented the English team at the 1950 British Empire Games in Auckland, New Zealand, where he won the bronze medal in the eights event.

== Personal life ==
Tony Butcher was married to wife Peggy and had four children, John, Adrian, David and Marilyn. He lived for most of his life in Beaconsfield.

== See also ==
- List of Cambridge University Boat Race crews
