= Ewan Pearson (rower) =

Scottish rower

Sport
- Sport: Rowing
- Club: [CUBC then Molesey Boat Club]
Medal record
Men's Rowing
Representing Scotland
Commonwealth Games
Bronze medal – third place	1986 Edinburgh	Coxless Pair

Ewan Murray Gilmour Pearson is a Scottish former international rower who participated in the 1986 Commonwealth Games.

== Rowing career ==
Pearson started rowing at The King's School, Canterbury in 1975, gaining a seat in their 1st VIII in 1978, a year when with Christopher Perry he also won the National Championships in the J16 double sculls, setting a course record. In 1980 he won the J18 Double Sculls National Title with Andrew Civil, and together they then competed for England, winning the same event at the Home Countries Regatta in Athlone, Ireland. He competed for Cambridge University in The Boat Race, in 1982, 1983 and 1984.

Pearson was part of the coxless pairs crew, with David Riches that won the national rowing title for Molesey Boat Club, at the 1984 and 1985 National Rowing Championships. The following year the pair participated in the 1986 Commonwealth Games, where for Scotland he won a bronze medal in the men's coxless pairs, again with David Riches. He competed at Henley Royal Regatta from 1978 to 1991, and was a double winner of the Silver Goblets & Nickalls' Challenge Cup in 1984 and 1985, losing the final of the same event to Steve Redgrave (Sir) and Andy Holmes in 1986. He also rowed for The Canterbury Pilgrims and Crabtree Boat Clubs from 1987 to 2014.

== Personal life ==
He studied at The King's School, Canterbury from 1975 to 1980. He was awarded a place at Jesus College, Cambridge, matriculating in September 1982. He graduated in medical sciences in 1984 and worked as a doctor, schoolteacher and investment banker before setting up a consultancy business, Grant Pearson Brown Consulting Ltd, in April 1993 with co-founder Alastair Grant, a former Royal Marine Colonel. In 2008 he took on the task of building a new boathouse for Cambridge University Boat Club, running Project Ely then chairing the development company, CUBL, through to the completion in 2017, and the opening of the boathouse by the University Vice Chancellor, Leszek Borysiewicz. In 2017 Ewan became Executive Chairman of the Cambridge University Boat Club.
