= William Falls =

English doctor and rower

William Stewart Falls (1825 – 22 May 1889) was an English medical doctor and rower who won Silver Wherries at Henley Royal Regatta.

Falls was born at Clifton, Bristol, the son of William Falls, a naval surgeon, and his wife Elizabeth. He received medical training at St George's Hospital. He was a keen water sportsman and rowed for the St George's Club on the River Thames. In 1847 with his friend, W Coulthard, he won Silver Wherries at Henley Royal Regatta beating T Pollock and Thomas Howard Fellows of Leander Club on appeal in the final.

Falls received his M.R.C.S.Eng. in 1847 and was house-surgeon at St George's Hospital. In 1849, he started in practice at Hampstead with Mr. Evans. In 1856 he went to Bournemouth where he was consulting physician at the Royal Victoria Hospital and at St. Mary's Home for Invalid Ladies in Bournemouth. He was a recognised specialist in diseases of the chest and was senior physician of the Sanatorium for Consumption and Diseases of the Chest. He took the degree of M.D. at St. Andrews in 1863 and became F.R.C P.London in 1875.

In 1867 Falls was elected a member of the Bournemouth Improvement Commissioners. The town's population of 300 when he arrived rose to 30,000 by the time of his death in 1889 at the age of 64.

Falls was noted for his kind and affable manner. He married twice, firstly on 17 January 1850 to Annie Eyken who died in 1866 and secondly to Alicia M Hamond in 1868. He had seven children including William Coulthard Falls who was a doctor in London.
