= Robert Gordon (rower) =

English rower

Robert Gordon (30 July 1830 – 11 October 1914) was an English rower who won the Silver Goblets at Henley Royal Regatta, and clergyman.

Gordon was born at West Bromwich, Staffordshire, the son of Rev, William Gordon of Lichfield. He was educated at Bridgnorth School and at Christ's College, Cambridge He won the university rowing pairs in 1853 with J. B. Barlee and the Silver Goblets at Henley Royal Regatta in 1854 also with Barlee. He won University pairs again in 1856 with P. H. Wormald

Gordon was ordained deacon (Lichfield) in 1854 and priest in 1856. He was curate of Norton, Staffordshire from 1854 to 1855, curate of Longdon from 1855 to 1856 and curate of Speen and lecturer at Speenhamland, Berkshire from 1856 to 1858. He became rector of Hammerwick, Lichfield in 1858, where he remained until 1890. He later lived at Uplands, Grove Park Road, Weston-super-Mare where he died at the age of 84.
