= Edward Sturges =

British rower

Edward M Sturges (1920–1997) was an English rower, a behind-the-lines marines officer in World War II and a fitness enthusiast who ran an elite gymnasium in London.

Sturges was born at Kensington. He was educated at Radley College where he was one of the winning crew in the Ladies' Challenge Plate at Henley Royal Regatta in 1938. During World War II he served as a major in the Royal Marines in Burma behind enemy lines. In spite of his size, he was able to creep as stealthily as a cat and ran an effective guerilla campaign.

After the second world war, Sturges joined London Rowing Club and won Silver Goblets at Henley Royal Regatta partnering John Pinches. They were runners up in the same event in 1950 and also in 1950, Sturges won the Wingfield Sculls.

Sturges ran a gymnasium in Knightsbridge for forty years and trained generations of young people, including the four children of Queen Elizabeth II. He retired to Benson, Oxfordshire in 1992. He trained every day and had sculled on the evening he died at the age 76.
