= Argonaut Club =

English rowing club

- Location: London, England
- Home water: Tideway

Distinctions
- Wingfield Sculls (1853), Stewards' Challenge Cup, Wyfold Challenge Cup and Silver Goblets (1856)

Notable members
- James Paine

The Argonaut Club was an English rowing club based on the Tideway of the River Thames that competed in the middle of the 19th century.

== History ==
The Argonaut Club was active in the 1850s and its first major successes were in the Visitors' Challenge Cup at Henley Royal Regatta in 1852 and 1853. The most prominent member, James Paine won the Wingfield Sculls in 1853.

Argonaut was one of several clubs on the Tideway including Wandle Club, Thames Club, St George's Club, Meteor Club and Petrel Club. In 1856 there was a move to combine these clubs into a single club that could compete successfully against the Oxford and Cambridge crews at Henley in the four and eight. To achieve this, the London Rowing Club was formed.

Under the rules of the Henley Regatta, a club had to be in existence for a year before it could compete at the regatta. For this reason, the London Rowing Club members competed under the aegis of the Argonaut Club in 1856. Its crack four, composed of Josias Nottidge, A. A. Casamajor, James Paine, and Herbert Playford at stroke, and F. Levien as cox won the Stewards' Challenge Cup and the Wyfold Challenge Cup. The same four comprised the final of the Silver Goblets with Casamajor and Nottidge winning over Paine and Playford.

In addition, Casamajor won the Diamond Challenge Sculls at Henley and also won the Wingfield Sculls for Argonaut Club in 1856.

In 1857, London Rowing Club was able to compete at Henley in its own name when it won the Grand Challenge Cup and the Argonaut Club went out of existence.

== Honours ==
=== Henley Royal Regatta ===
Year	Winning crew
1852	Visitors' Challenge Cup
1853	Visitors' Challenge Cup
1856	Wyfold Challenge Cup
