= Humphrey Playford =

English rower

Humphrey Blake Playford (8 February 1896 – 1981) was an English rower distinguished by rowing in three successful races against Oxford University and rowing Head of the River for Jesus College, Cambridge in the same three years.

== Birth, Parentage and Youth ==
Playford was born in Hampton, then in Middlesex, the son of Frank Lumley Playford and his wife, Kate Percy Ward.

He was educated at St Paul's School, London. Leaving school in 1914, he was employed as a temporary Clerk in the Army Audit Office, Headquarters, Eastern Command. He attested in the British Army on 27 December 1915 and was mustered on strength as a Driver, Army Service Corps. He was discharged on 21 January 1916 to take up a Commission, being appointed Second Lieutenant, Army Service Corps, Horse Transport, with effect from 22 January 1916. He crossed to France in April 1916. In 1918 he returned to England and was posted on attachment to 70 Wing, Royal Air Force, Felixstowe. He resigned his commission with effect from 29 January 1919.

== Cambridge ==
Playford went up to Jesus College, Cambridge in 1919, graduating B.A. in 1921 and M.A. in 1925.

He was 6 ft 5in tall, with a long reach, and quickly made his mark as a rower: In March 1919 he was picked in the place of R.C. Guthrie (indisposed) to row in the Jesus College crew in the semi-finals of the Fixed-seat, Eight oared Races.

He rowed in the winning Cambridge crews in the Boat Race in 1920, 1921 and 1922.

In July 1921 Playford won the Silver Goblets at Henley in a coxed pair with John Campbell, defeating Guy Oliver Nickalls and Richard Lucas "easily" in the final.

He served as President of the Cambridge University Boat Club (C.U.B.C.) from October 1921 - April 1922.

Rowing stroke with G.O. Nickalls, bow, he was beaten by five feet by W.F. Godden and R.E. Eason of Trinity College, Oxford, in the final for the Silver Goblets and Nickalls Challenge Cup at the Henley Royal Regatta on 7 July 1923.

== Professional career ==
Playford was ordained as a deacon in the Church of England by the Bishop of Ely, the Right Reverend Frederic Henry Chase, at Ely Cathedral on 8 October 1922. He was ordained as a priest at Jesus College Chapel by the Bishop of Ely on 8 June 1924. He served as Chaplain of Jesus College, Cambridge, 1922–1924.

He served as Curate of Christ Church, Trafalgar Road, East Greenwich, 1924-1925. In 1925 he was recruited by J.F. Roxburgh, and appointed as Assistant Chaplain and Master at Stowe School in Buckinghamshire. He was appointed as first Under-Housemaster of Grafton House in 1926, and served as Housemaster of Bruce House, 1928-1939 and 1940-1953. He was described as a "larger-than-life figure of strong opinions, known to be quite combative in the Common Room".

When the Second World War broke out, Playford took leave of absence to play a short, but exciting, role in hostilities: "Even ... the Reverend Humphrey Playford, now rising 40 [sic], had managed to be driving ambulances in Nazi-threatened France [in the summer of 1940] (before beating a hasty retreat)”.

He retired from Stowe School on 29 July 1958.

== Later life ==
Playford was married, in Cambridge in 1959, to Elizabeth Mary Bickersteth ("Betty") Birks, the daughter of the late Dr. Guy Thornton Birks and his wife, Elsie A. Marsh, of Bedford; she was born on 5 January 1914.

He settled in Hampshire, and died there, aged 85 years, in 1981. His widow, Mrs. Betty Playford, died, aged 87 years, in 2001.

== Publications ==
- F. Brittain and H. B. Playford The Jesus College Boat Club, Cambridge Cambridge 1928
- F. Brittain and H. B. Playford The Jesus College, Cambridge, Boat Club, 1827-1962 Cambridge 1962

== See also ==
- List of Cambridge University Boat Race crews
