= John Pinches =

English rower and author (1916–2007)

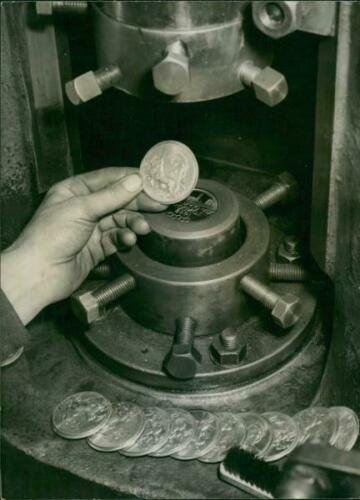
1948 London Olympic medals minted at the works of John Pinches in Clapham

John Harvey Pinches MC (9 April 1916 – 2 July 2007) was an English rower, Royal Engineers officer, medallist and author.

Pinches was born at Chelsea, London, the son of John Robert Pinches and Irene Inchbold. His father was a medallist in the family business which was founded in London by Pinches' great-great uncle in 1840. After attending Chelsea Polytechnic and two years' engineering training, Pinches joined the family firm.

Pinches was a member London Rowing Club and was in the crews which won events at Henley Royal Regatta from 1935 to 1939 including the Grand Challenge Cup, the leading race for eights at the Regatta, in 1938. He was also a member of The Skiff Club and won the Gentlemen's Single Sculls at the Skiff Championships Regatta in 1937, 1938 and 1939. He also won the Gentlemen's Double Sculls in 1937 and 1938.

In the Second World War, Pinches was commissioned into the Duke of Wellington's Regiment, but was transferred to the Royal Engineers because of his engineering qualifications. He served in North Africa, Palestine, Greece and Italy. He won the Military Cross at Salerno on 22 September 1943. The British Army's advance north was held up by a lorry and anti-tank gun which had broken down, blocking a bridge. Pinches pulled a heavy winch rope single-handed across the bridge under enemy fire to the damaged vehicle so it could be towed away. Later he served in the occupation of Austria before being demobilised as Lieutenant-Colonel.

In 1947, together with Edward Sturges, he won the Silver Goblets for pairs at Henley, after a memorable semi-final victory by six feet. He was approached by the Amateur Rowing Association to ask if he would make up a crew with Dickie Burnell for the 1948 Summer Olympics, which were to be held on the Henley course. Pinches insisted on having proper trials, but as these were not customary at the time, the ARA paired Burnell with Bert Bushnell, who subsequently won the pairs. In 1950, Pinches was runner-up in the Silver Goblets with Sturges and won the Gentlemen's Single Scull in the Skiff Championships again. Pinches was an ebullient and enthusiastic captain of the London Rowing Club in 1952. He became an international coach and attended world and European championships, as well as the 1960 Summer Olympics in Rome, when he advised the coxless fours and coxed fours. He continued to row competitively until he was 60, his last victory being in an international veterans' regatta in 1976 at Tours, France.

Pinches continued to run the family medallion business, whose output included badges and insignia in Britain, commemorative issues for much of the Commonwealth, and decorations and orders for overseas governments. In 1940 the business was turned into a Limited Company -John Pinches (Medallists) Ltd. It was sold to the Franklin Mint of Philadelphia, USA, in 1969 and Pinches moved to Wiltshire. His wife, Rosemary, had worked at the College of Arms, contributed a comprehensive bibliography of Burke's Peerage Ltd publications produced between 1826 and 1976 to Burke's Family Index (1976), and established a heraldry and genealogy business. Together they wrote books on heraldry and genealogy.

Pinches died in 2007 at the age of 91.

== Publications ==
- Pinches, J. H.; Pinches, R. V. (1974). The Royal Heraldry of England. London: Heraldry Today. ISBN 090045525X.
- Pinches, John Harvey (1981). The Family of Pinches: the medallists, their Shropshire forebears back to 1490, and some collateral families. London: Heraldry Today. ISBN 0900455306.
- Pinches, John Harvey (1987). Medals by John Pinches: a catalogue of works struck by the company from 1840 to 1969. London: Heraldry Today. ISBN 0-900455-43-8. (A private printing limited to 500 copies.)
- Pinches, J. H. (1994). European Nobility and Heraldry: a comparative study of the titles of nobility and their heraldic exterior ornaments for each country, with historical notes. Ramsbury: Heraldry Today. ISBN 0900455454.
