= James Charles Macnab of Macnab =

23rd Chief of Clan Macnab (1926–2013)

Clan Macnab
- Crest: The head of a savage affrontée Proper
- Motto: Timor Ommis Abesto (Let fear be far from all)

Profile
- Plant badge: Stone bramble or common heath

Chief
- James William Archibald Macnab of Macnab
- 24th Chief of Clan Macnab.
Septs of Clan Macnab
Abbot, Abbott, Abbotson, Cleland, Dewar, Gilfillan, Gillan, Maclellan, Macandeoir, MacNair
Allied clans
Clan Mackinnon
Clan MacGregor
Rival clans
Clan Neish

James Charles Macnab of Macnab JP (14 April 1926 – 11 January 2013), otherwise known as The Macnab, was the 23rd Chief of Clan Macnab, and a member of the Royal Company of Archers, Queen Elizabeth II's bodyguard in Scotland.

== Early life ==
Born in London, the elder son of Lieutenant-Colonel James Alexander Macnabb OBE TD, de jure the 21st Macnab of Macnab, by his marriage to Ursula Walford (formerly Barnett), of Wokingham, the young Macnab was educated at Cothill House, Radley College, and Ashbury College, Ottawa.

== Career ==
Between 1944 and 1945, during the closing stages of the Second World War, Macnab served in the Royal Air Force and the Scots Guards. He was commissioned as a Lieutenant into the Seaforth Highlanders in 1945. In 1948 he transferred to the Federation of Malaya Police Force, serving successively as an Assistant Superintendent, then Acting Deputy Superintendent, and retired in 1957. He returned as a Captain into the Seaforth Highlanders (Territorial Army), from 1960 to 1964, and was a justice of the peace for Perthshire from 1968 to 1975, then for Stirling from 1975 to 1986.

In 1961 he was elected to the Western Perthshire District Council, and from 1964 to 1975 was a County Councillor for Perth and Kinross. He became a Member of the Central Regional Council in 1978, serving until 1982. He was an Executive Consultant with Hill Samuel Investment Services from 1982 to 1992.

== Marriage ==
In 1959 Macnab married Diana Mary, daughter of William Anstruther-Gray, Baron Kilmany. They have two sons and two daughters.

== Clan chief ==
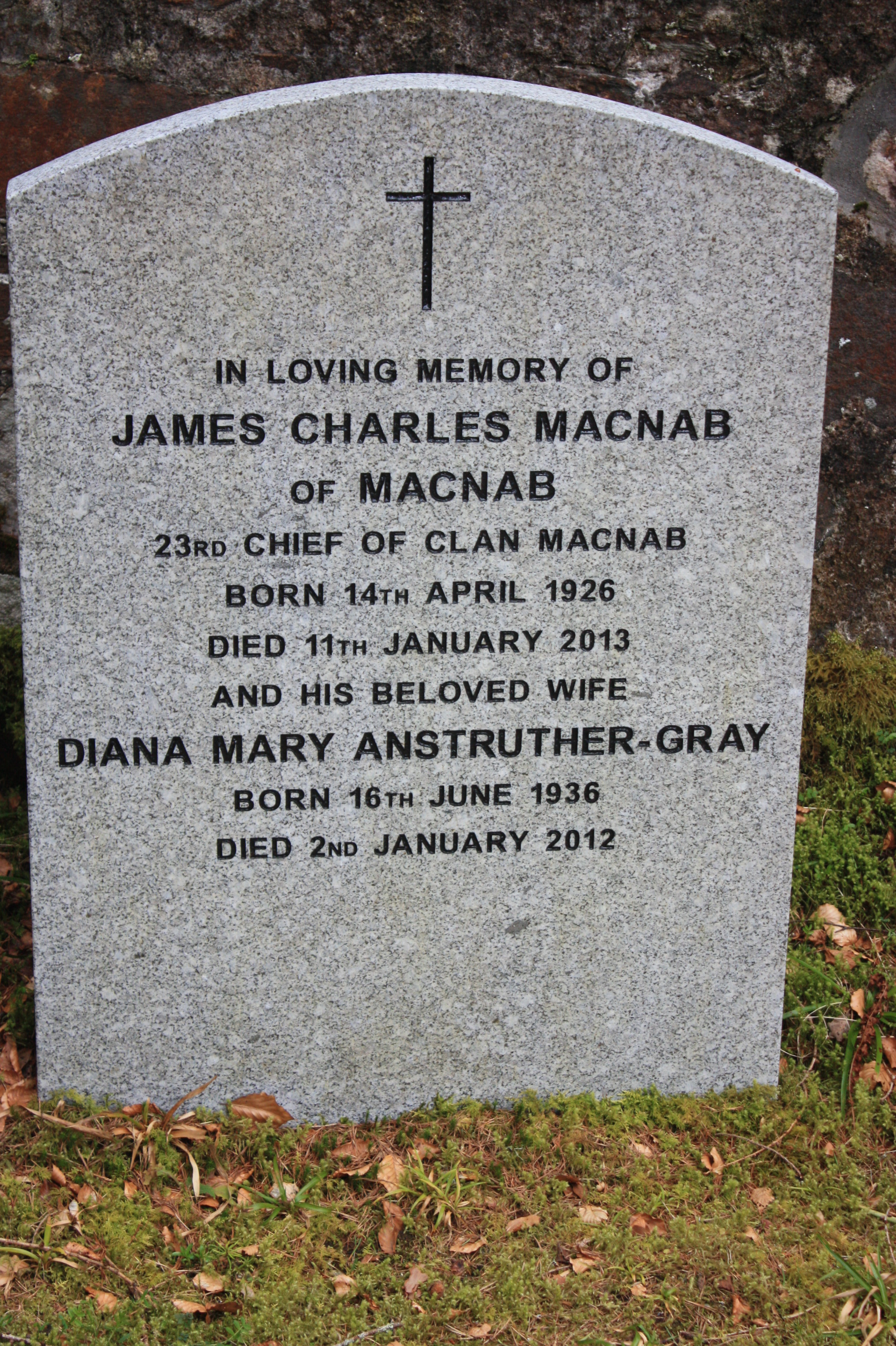
Grave of James Charles MacNab of MacNab, Old MacNab Burial Ground, Killin

In 1860 Archibald MacNab of MacNab, the 17th Chief, and last in the direct male line of Chiefs, died in France at the age of eighty-three. Sarah Anne McNab, his daughter, is now considered the 18th Chief. After she died in Florence in 1894 the succession was disputed until the 1950s. After long years of research, begun in earnest in 1907, the Arthurstone Macnabbs, who were descended from a younger son of a Chief who died in 1645, were able to establish their claim. James William Macnabb of Arthurstone (1831–1915) is now deemed to have succeeded as 19th Chief, thus making his grandson James Alexander Macnabb (1901–1990) the 21st Chief de jure. However, in 1949 his uncle Archibald Corrie Macnabb bought Kinnell House, Killin, and a large part of the former Macnab estate from the Breadalbane Trustees, and in 1956 James Alexander Macnabb gave up his rights in favour of his uncle, whom the Lord Lyon King of Arms recognised as 22nd Chief de facto, while confirming James Charles Macnab as his heir presumptive.

In 1970 Macnab succeeded his great uncle, Archibald Corrie Macnab of Macnab, as Chief. However, he was faced with high death duties, with the result that in 1978 he had to sell Kinnell House and much of the estate. He went on living at Finlarig, Killin, until 1985, when he moved to Fife following the death of his wife's parents.

The Macnab lived at Leuchars Castle Farmhouse, Leuchars, St Andrews, Fife, and was a member of the New Club, Edinburgh. His elder son James William Archibald Macnab, (born 1963), became the 24th Chief of Clan MacNab on his death.

== See also ==
- Standing Council of Scottish Chiefs
- Clan Macnab
