= A. A. Casamajor =

British rower

Alexander Alcée Casamajor (1833 – 7 August 1861) was a British rower who won the Wingfield Sculls in six successive years and the Diamond Challenge Sculls at Henley Royal Regatta as well as being twice in the winning Grand Challenge Cup team.

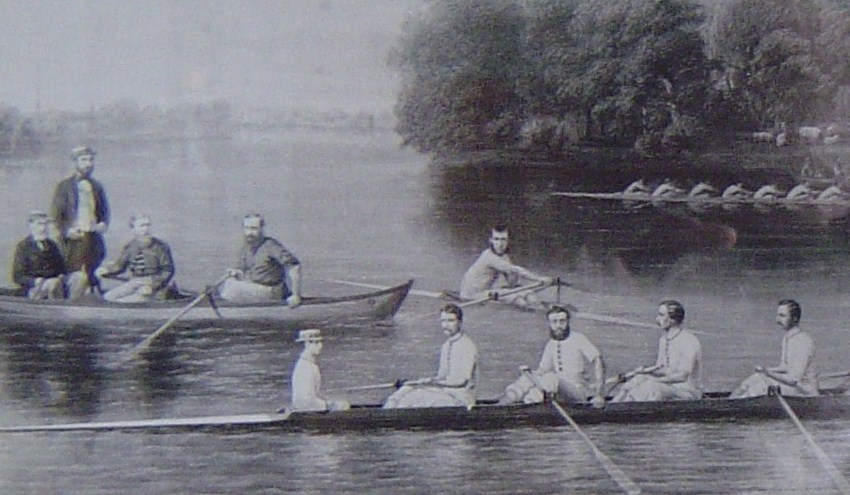
Casamajor is the single sculler

Casamajor was an amateur and won his first public sculling match at Barnes Regatta in 1852. He rowed for Wandle Club in 1855 when he won the Wingfield Sculls and Diamond Challenge sculls at Henley beating Herbert Playford in the final. He also won Silver Goblets at Henley with Josias Nottidge beating W F Short and Edward Cadogan.

In 1856, Casamajor helped Nottidge and Playford establish the London Rowing Club, becoming secretary. As a newly founded club, they were unable to enter Henley Royal Regatta in 1856, so its members competed as members of the Argonaut Club. Casamajor was in a coxed four with Nottidge, James Paine and Playford which won the Stewards' Challenge Cup and the Wyfold Challenge Cup. In 1856 at Henley he won the Diamonds beating C Stephens in the final and partnered Nottidge again in the Silver Goblets which they won over their colleagues Paine and Playford. He also won the Wingfield Sculls for Argonaut Club.

In 1857 the London Rowing Club competed at Henley and won the Grand Challenge Cup and the Stewards' Cup with Casamajor in the crews. Though primarily a sculler, Casamajor helped the club eight win the Grand Challenge Cup at Henley in 1857 and 1859 although on both occasions he showed extreme exhaustion. He won Diamonds in 1857, beating Paine in the final.

In 1858, Casamajor won the Diamond Challenge sculls with a row over and won Silver Goblets with Playford when they beat Edmond Warre and Arthur Lonsdale in the final in 1858. Casamajor helped the club eight win the Grand Challenge Cup and partnered Paine in the Silver Goblets in 1859 when they were runners-up to Warre and John Arkell. In 1860, he won Silver Goblets partnering W Woodbridge. He won the Wingfield sculls with a row over in 1857, 1858, 1859 and 1860. In 1861, he won the Diamond Challenge Sculls, again beating Edwin Brickwood in the final.

Casamajor died from a broken blood vessel at the age of 28, a month after winning at Henley and three days before the date of the Wingfield Sculls and the race was postponed in tribute. He won 45 races of approximately 60 in which he took part, and was never beaten in a public event. Casamajor was also rowing correspondent of The Field.

A tribute in Hunts Yachting Magazine noted

"THIS gentleman's sudden death on Wednesday Aug 7th caused great regret amongst the rowing men on the Thames and a large circle of friends His kindly disposition gained him the esteem of all parties with whom he came in contact during his long and successful career as the Champion Sculler on the Thames and the aquatic editor of DeWs Life himself an oracle on boating says His wonderful prowess as an oarsman and sculler and unflinching pluck at once directed attention to the boat in which he was pulling a match and without disparagement to his predecessors and contemporaries we may pronounce him to have been one of the best scullers that have ever appeared."

Casamajor had a distinctive sculling style with a very long swing back with straight arms and a stiff back until the blades came out of the water of their own accord. As a result, he pulled himself up on the blades slightly at the start of the recovery so that his technique was considered inferior to contemporaries such as Herbert Playford. However, he had great strength and his technique was effective, it being noted that on an occasion when he rowed out of style he was quickly down at the start, although he went on to win when he reverted to his long stroke.
