= Courtenay Knollys =

British rower and colonial administrator

Sir Clement Courtenay Knollys KCMG (1849 – 16 December 1905) was a British rower and colonial administrator and governor.

Knollys was the son of Rev. Erskine Knollys and his wife Caroline Augusta North. His father was rector at Quedgeley, Gloucestershire, among other parishes. He was educated at Magdalen College, Oxford, where he distinguished himself as a rower. In 1872 he was substituted into the Oxford crew four days before that year's Boat Race which was won by Cambridge by two lengths. However later that year he won the Diamond Challenge Sculls at Henley Royal Regatta and beat the holder William Fawcus to win the Wingfield Sculls. He joined Kingston Rowing Club and in 1873 won the Silver Goblets with Alfred Trower, but lost the Wingfield Sculls to A. C. Dicker. He also rowed in 1873 Boat Race.

Knollys became a colonial administrator. In 1885 he was a colonial secretary in Barbados and up to 1894 was a member of the assembly. In 1904 Knollys was appointed Governor of the British Leeward Islands but died at Southsea in the following year at the age of 56.

== See also ==
- List of Oxford University Boat Race crews
- List of governors of the Leeward Islands

Government offices
Preceded by Sir Gerald Strickland	Governor of the Leeward Islands; 1904–1905	Succeeded by Sir Ernest Sweet-Escott
