= Josias Nottidge =

English rower

Josias Nottidge (1828–1873) was an English rower who twice won Silver Goblets at Henley Royal Regatta.

Nottidge rowed initially for Wandle Club . He took part in the Wingfield Sculls in 1853 when it was won by James Paine. In the heat, there was a private match between Nottidge and H C Smith for a £15 cup. In 1855 he won Silver Goblets at Henley Royal Regatta partnering A. A. Casamajor and beating W F Short and E Cadogan in the final. In 1856 he was one of the founders of the London Rowing Club with Casamajor and Herbert Playford. As the new club was unable to compete at Henley, they rowed under the name of Argonaut Club in 1856. Nottidge won Silver Goblets with Casamajor again against fellow club members Henry Playford and James Paine. Nottidge, Paine, Playford and Casamajor also rowed in a coxed four to win Stewards Challenge Cup. In 1857 they competed as London Rowing Club to win Stewards again and the Grand Challenge Cup supplemented in the crew by Ireland (bow), Potter, Schlosel and Farrar. Casamajor and Nottidge, however, came third this year in Silver Goblets.

Nottidge died at Bromley at the age of 45.
