= David Riches (anatomist) =

British anatomist known for research on dermatology

Professor David Riches
- Scientific career
- Fields: Anatomy
- Institutions: Queen Mary University of London, Gonville and Caius College, Cambridge, International Medical University

David Riches is a British anatomist. He is Emeritus Professor of Anatomy at Queen Mary University of London and a Fellow and Director of Studies at Gonville and Caius College, Cambridge. He is noted for research on dermatology, particularly the basement membrane zone and bullous disorders. He has formerly been Dean of Medical Sciences at the International Medical University in Kuala Lumpur.

He was appointed Arnott Demonstrator of the Royal College of Surgeons of England in 1976.
