= David Riches (rower) =

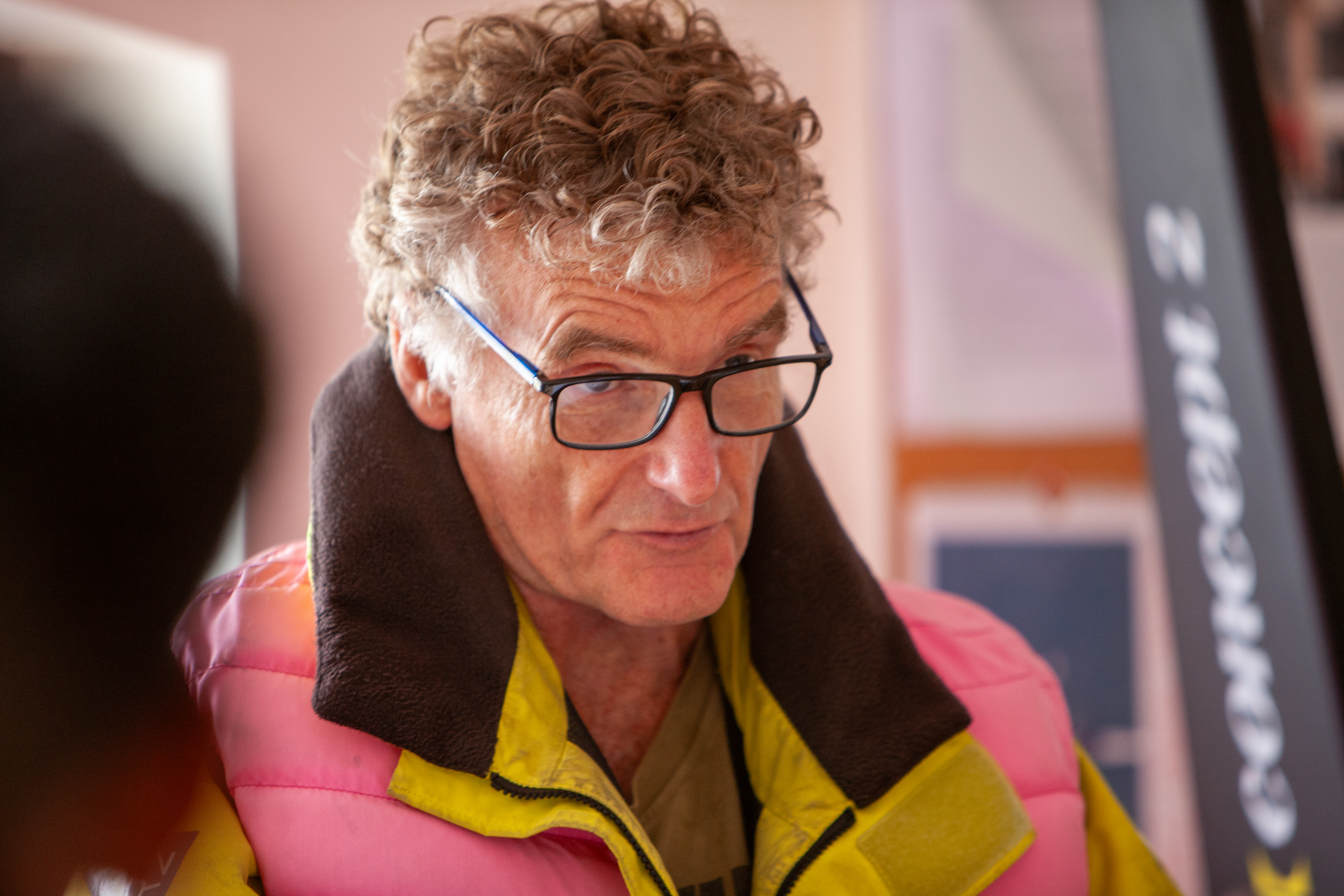
- David Riches teaching at WSBC

Personal information
- Full name: Christopher David M Riches
- Born: 23 March 1961 (age 65)

Sport
- Sport: Rowing
- Club: Molesey Boat Club
Medal record
Men's Rowing
Representing Scotland
Commonwealth Games
Bronze medal – third place	1986 Edinburgh	Coxless Pair

David Riches (or CD Riches) (born 1961) is a former Scottish international rower who participated in the 1986 Commonwealth Games.

== Career ==
=== Rowing career ===
Riches was part of the coxless pairs crew, with Ewan Pearson that won the national title rowing for Molesey Boat Club, at the 1985 National Rowing Championships. The following year the pair participated in the 1986 Commonwealth Games, where he won a bronze medal in the men's coxless pairs. He was a double winner of the Silver Goblets & Nickalls' Challenge Cup in 1984 and 1985.

=== Teaching career ===
David Riches currently teaches history and works as the head of rowing at Westminster School, primarily as a rowing coach.
