= Guy Oliver Nickalls =

British rower (1899–1974)

- Born: 4 April 1899
- Died: 26 April 1974 (aged 75)
- Education: Eton College
- Alma mater: Magdalen College, Oxford
- Occupation: rower
- Parent: Guy Nickalls

Guy Oliver Nickalls (4 April 1899 – 26 April 1974), also known as Gully Nickalls, was a British rower who competed in the 1920 Summer Olympics and in the 1928 Summer Olympics.

== Life ==
Nickalls was the son of Guy Nickalls, who was also a rower and an Olympic gold medalist and his wife Ellen Gilbey Gold. His grandfather, Tom Nickalls, was one of the founding members of London Rowing Club. Nickalls' mother was the sister of Sir Harcourt Gold, who was chairman of Henley Royal Regatta from 1945 to 1952 and Chairman of the ARA from 1948 to 1952.. Nickalls was educated at Eton College and Magdalen College, Oxford.

Olympic medal record

Men's rowing
Silver medal – second place	1920 Antwerp	Eight
Silver medal – second place	1928 Amsterdam	Eight

In 1920, rowing for Magdalen, Nickalls partnered Richard Lucas to win the Silver Goblets & Nickalls' Challenge Cup at Henley Royal Regatta, beating Bruce Logan and S I Fairbairn in the final. Later in the year, Nickalls was a member of the Leander eight which won the silver medal for Great Britain rowing at the 1920 Summer Olympics, coming within half a length of winning. In 1921, Nickalls rowed in the Oxford crew which lost to Cambridge in the Boat Race and also lost the final of the Silver Goblets to John Campbell and Humphrey Playford. In 1922, he rowed in the losing Oxford Boat Race crew again, but regained Silver Goblets with Lucas, beating Karl Vernon and H West in the final. In 1923 he was in the winning Oxford boat in the Boat Race but was runner up again in the Silver Goblets. He was runner up in Silver Goblets again with various partners in 1925, 1926 and 1927.

When the outside sport broadcasts covered the Boat Race for the first time on 2 April 1927, Nickalls became the first ex-sportsman to broadcast from an outside broadcast microphone. The BBC had hired the launch Magician to carry four BBC engineers, a pilot, 1,000 lbs of generator and batteries and the two new commentators: Nickalls and Sir John Squire. Nickalls said afterwards: "We stood on each other's foot when it was our turn to interrupt and simply poured excited words from start to finish, totally oblivious to being heard or not." They were – and the director-general, John Reith, wired his congratulations.

In the 1928 season, Nickalls rowed with the Thames Rowing Club first eight, which won the Grand Challenge Cup at Henley Royal Regatta and then represented Great Britain rowing at the 1928 Summer Olympics.

Nickalls followed in his uncle's footsteps and was Chairman of the ARA during the 1950s, the period when the ARA amalgamated with the NARA and finally ending the gentleman/tradesman amateur split in the UK. He was also a steward of Henley regatta – his silver Stewards badge now held by Sir Steve Redgrave, the only person to have surpassed his father's record of six wins in the Goblets.

== Achievements ==
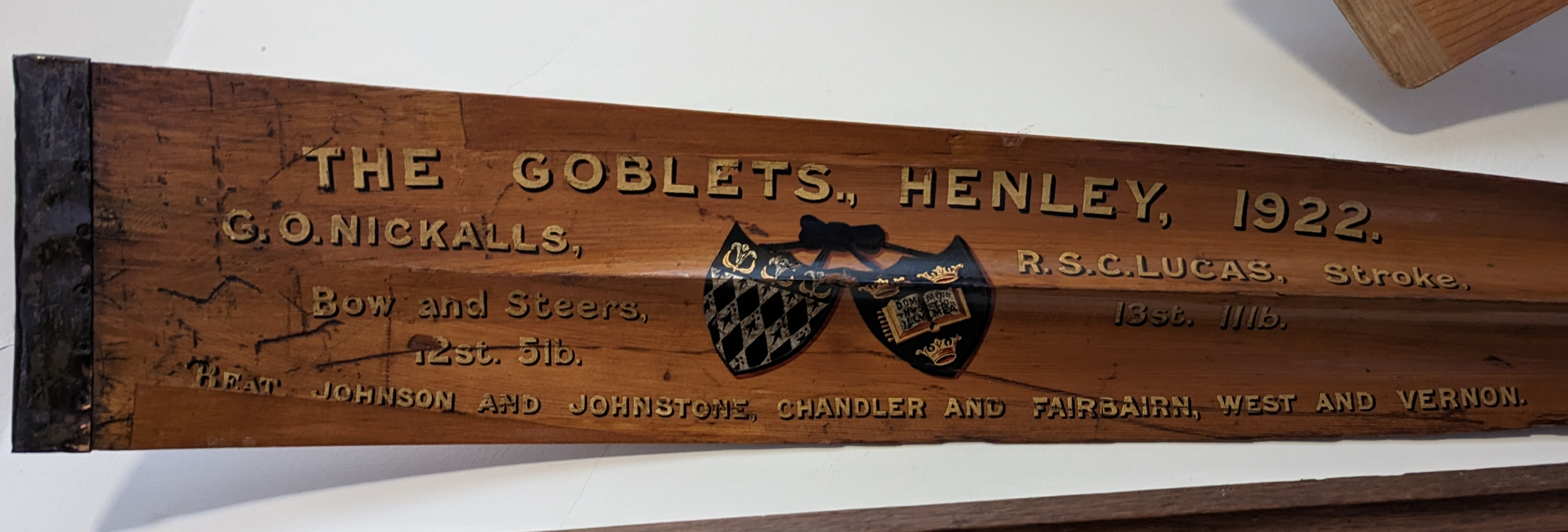
Blade from the Goblets, 1922

=== Olympic Games ===
- 1920 – Silver, Eight
- 1928 – Silver, Eight

=== Henley Wins ===
- 1920 – Silver Goblets & Nickalls' Challenge Cup
- 1922 – Silver Goblets & Nickalls' Challenge Cup
- 1928 – Grand Challenge Cup

== Published works ==
- Rowing, 1949 – G.O. Nickalls and Dr P.C. Mallam
- Life's a pudding: an autobiography, 1939 – Guy Nickalls with additional chapter by G.O. Nickalls
- With the Skin of their Teeth. Memories of great sporting finishes, 1951 – Edited by G.O. Nickalls
- A Rainbow in the sky: Reminiscences, 1974 -G.O. Nickalls

== See also ==
- List of Oxford University Boat Race crews
