= James Hastie (rower) =

British rower (1848–1897)

James Hastie (1848 – 9 December 1897) was a British rower who won Silver Goblets at Henley Royal Regatta three times.

== Early life and career ==
Hastie was born at sea, and became a brewers agent in London. He was a member of Thames Rowing Club where he was a long-standing captain. In 1877 Hastie with W Eyre won Silver Goblets at Henley Royal Regatta beating Frank Lumley Playford and S Le B Smith in the final. He was captain of Thames in 1878 when he was involved in meetings to set up the Amateur Rowing Association and to set a definition for amateur. In 1879 with Eyre he was runner-up in Silver Goblets to Francis Gulston and R H Labat. However Hastie and Eyre won Silver Goblets in 1880 beating Alexander Payne and F D Leader in the final and in 1881 beating Playford and P Adcock in the final. He spent the night of the census in 1881 at the Thames Clubhouse in Putney.

Hastie died in the Staines district at the age of 49.
