= Edward Buck (lawyer) =

American lawyer and writer (1814–1876)

Edward Buck (October 6, 1814 – July 16, 1876) was an American lawyer and writer. He was the author of The Drift of the War (1861) and Massachusetts Ecclesiastical Law (1866).

== Biography ==
Buck, the fifth son of Gurdon and Susannah (Manwaring) Buck, and a descendant of Gov. Gurdon Saltonstall, of Connecticut, was born in New York City, Oct. 6, 1814. He graduated from Yale College in 1835. He studied law in New York City, and began practice there in 1838. In 1843 he removed to Boston, where he continued actively engaged in his profession until his death. From 1854 onwards he lived in Andover, Massachusetts, where he died, July 16, 1876, at the age of 62. Buck was a frequent writer for the newspapers, and in 1866 published an important volume on Massachusetts Ecclesiastical Law (Boston, 8vo, 316 pp.). As a prominent Christian layman his interest in all educational and philanthropic matters was always intelligent and active. He married, June 8, 1841, Elizabeth Greene, daughter of Hon. Samuel Hubbard, of Boston, a Justice of the Supreme Court of Massachusetts. She survived him with their two children, a son and a daughter. The son graduated Yale in 1870.
