= Albert de Lande Long =

English iron founder and manufacturer

Albert De Lande Long (13 September 1844 – 23 February 1917) was an English iron founder and manufacturer who co-founded the company Dorman Long. Before doing so he was a highly successful adult amateur rower.

== Biography ==
Long was born at Ipswich, the son of Peter Bartholemew Long, a solicitor, and his wife Hannah Justinia Falkland.

He was a member of London Rowing Club and in 1868 partnered with William Stout to win pairs at the Metropolitan Regatta. He won the Grand Challenge Cup (in a crew of eight) five times between 1868 and 1877. In 1869 he won the Silver Goblets equally at Henley Royal Regatta with Stout, the London Cup at the Metropolitan Regatta and the Wingfield Sculls. He retained the Wingfield Sculls in 1870, but came third in the shorter Diamond Challenge Sculls that year at Henley. In 1871 he re-won the Silver Goblets with Francis Gulston. He lost the long-distance Wingfield Sculls to William Fawcus. He won the Silver Goblets again with Gulston in 1872 and 1874.

Long moved to Stockton-on-Tees where he co-founded the iron manufacturing company of Dorman Long with Arthur Dorman.

Long married Susanna Kelso at Knaresborough in 1875. Their son Lt-Col. Albert de Lande Long DSO DL (1880–1956), schooled at Winchester and a graduate of New College, Oxford, was also a rower. He rowed in the Boat Race for Oxford in 1901, 1902 and 1903, winning in his first such year and was OUBC President those last two years.

Long, Sr. died at Northallerton, North Yorkshire, on 23 February 1917.
