= Tony Leadley =

British rower

Personal information
- Born: 1928 (age 97–98) Bedford, England

Sport
- Sport: Rowing
Medal record
Men's rowing
Representing the United Kingdom
European Championships
| Gold medal – first place | 1957 Duisburg | Coxless pair |

David Antony Terence Leadley, known as Tony Leadley (born 1928), is a British rower.

Leadley was born in 1928 in Bedford, England. He was educated at Bedford Modern School, and the University of Cambridge. In 1953 Leadley was part of the winning Cambridge crew for the 1953 University Boat Race in the No. 5 position. The crew won by eight lengths in a time of 19 minutes and 54 seconds. After the 1953 Boat Race Leadley was elected President of Cambridge University Boat Club but, after failing a university examination, he had to resign and could no longer race for the University. He was later a member of the Leander Club.

At the 1957 European Rowing Championships held at Duisburg in Germany, Leadley partnered with Christopher Davidge and won the coxless pair event by 0.4 seconds.

There is a photographic portrait of him at the National Portrait Gallery.

== See also ==
- List of Cambridge University Boat Race crews
