= John Buckle Barlee =

English rower

John Buckle Barlee (2 June 1831 – August 1870) was an English rower who won the Silver Goblets at Henley Royal Regatta.

Barlee was born at West Chillington, Sussex, the son of Rev. William Barlee, rector of West Chillington and his wife Margaret. They belonged to a branch of the Buckle family which took the name of Barlee.

Barlee was educated at Christ's College, Cambridge and was Tancred Student in 1850. He never took part in the Boat Race but won the university rowing pairs and the Silver Goblets at Henley Royal Regatta in 1853 partnering Robert Gordon.

Barlee went into the army where he was in the Commissariat department, and was assistant commissary-general to HM Forces.

Barlee died in the Penzance district at the age of 39. He left a widow and children, including an elder son Dr. Hobart J. W. Barlee, who married on 1 January 1903 Amy Elizabeth Scott, daughter of Thomas Scott, of Singapore.
