= Stephen Rippingall =

English rower and cricketer

Stephen Frost Rippingall (12 December 1825 – 11 January 1856) was an English rower and cricketer who played first-class cricket for Cambridge University in 1845 and won the Diamond Challenge Sculls at Henley Royal Regatta in 1853.

Rippingall was born at Aylmerton, Norfolk, the son of Rev Stephen Frost Rippingall Vicar of Langham, Norfolk, and his wife Sarah Johnson. He was educated at Rugby School and Peterhouse, Cambridge. In 1845 he played for Cambridge University in two matches against MCC and in the Varsity Match when he took 10 wickets in a Cambridge 6 wicket victory. He took 21 first-class wickets in his three matches, but made just 12 runs in 4 innings with a top score of 8. He graduated BA in 1848.

In 1853 Rippingall won the Diamond Challenge Sculls at Henley in a time of 10 minutes 2 seconds. He also competed in the Wingfield Sculls but lost to James Paine.

Rippingall died at Norwich, Norfolk, at the age of 30 and was buried on 17 January 1856 at the Church of St Andrew and St Mary, Langham. His brother Cornelius had rowed in the Boat Race in 1845. In some sources including cricket databases, his surname is spelled "Rippinghall".
