= Henry Raine Barker =

English lawyer, banker and rower

Henry Raine Barker (11 November 1829 – 1902) was an English lawyer, banker and rower who won three events at Henley Royal Regatta in the same year in 1852

== Life ==
He was the son of Richard Barker of London, educated at Westminster School and Christ Church, Oxford. In 1852 he was a member of the Oxford University eight which won the Grand Challenge Cup at Henley Royal Regatta. He was also in the Oxford four which won the Stewards Challenge Cup and he won Silver Goblets partnering Philip Henry Nind.

Barker was admitted at Inner Temple in 1858. He became a banker and army agent. 1881 with his wife Caroline and children

Barker married Caroline Haynes and lived in Kensington and later at Harrow-on-the Hill. They were the parents of England footballer Richard Raine Barker and artist Anthony Raine Barker.

Barker died in North London at the age of 72.
