= Francis Gulston =

Francis Stepney Gulston (September 1845 – 1917) was a Welsh rower who at Henley Royal Regatta won the Grand Challenge Cup five times, the Stewards' Challenge Cup ten times, and the Silver Goblets five times.

Gulston was born at Llandilofawr, the son of Alan James Gulston of Woodland Castle, Swansea and of Llandilo, Carmarthenshire. His father was a landowner and was High Sheriff of Carmarthenshire in 1860. Gulston was educated at the Royal Naval School, and entered Magdalene College, Cambridge in 1863. It is said he went to Cambridge mainly and merely to row, and was recalled as taking up residence at the college with a pilot jacket on, a bottle of gin in one pocket and a bottle of bitters in the other. The authorities would hardly let him take part in a college crew, and would not consider him for the Cambridge eight because they thought his style was too professional. He became a civil engineer and was in business in London in 1866. Accounts exist of his social life in London and Wales

Gulston was a member of the Oscillators Club of Surbiton and then joined London Rowing Club heralding ten years of success with Gulston in their crews. LRC won the Grand Challenge Cup at Henley Royal Regatta in 1868 and the Stewards Challenge Cup in 1868, 1869 and 1871. Also in 1871, Gulston won the Silver Goblets partnering Albert de Lande Long. He was captain of London Rowing Club in 1872 when they won the Grand and Stewards and he won Silver Goblets with Long again. LRC won Stewards every year until 1878. Meanwhile, Gulston and Long were runners up in Silver Goblets in 1873 to Clement Courtenay Knollys and A Trower and won in 1874. They were disqualified in the final of Silver Goblets in 1875 but Gulston won with S le B Smith in 1876.

In August 1876 Guslon, together with R H Labat, A Trower and J Rowell went to Philadelphia on the steam ship Wyoming to take part in the town's centennial regatta. Gulston took part in the single scull and in the double scull with Labat. Prior to the event the rowers went for a swim in the Harlem giving scope for the local newspapers to describe their physiques. The New York Times wrote of Gulston "very much larger than the others His face is full with heavy whiskers and he is in all respects a thorough English oarsman. His shoulders and back are immense while he is not the least lacking in full development of arms and legs."

In 1877 LRC won the Grand as well as Stewards and in 1879 Gulston had his fifth win in Silver Goblets, this time partnering R H Labat. In 1878 and 1879, Gulston as captain of LRC was involved in meetings to set up the Amateur Rowing Association In 1881 Gulston was living in Putney with his wife and year old son.

Gulston was later living at Salcombe, Devon where he died at the age of 71. He was recalled as "that finest – I make no exception – gentleman oarsman".

Gulston married Emma Elizabeth Davis at Putney in 1880. His brother Alan Stepney Gulston was an artist and author.
