= Edward Buck (rower) =

English schoolmaster and rower

Edward Buck (born 1859) was an English schoolmaster and rower who won several events at Henley Royal Regatta.

Buck was the son of Albert Buck of Worcester. He was educated at Malvern College and matriculated at Hertford College, Oxford in 1876 where he studied mathematics and won the Hershell Astronomy Prize in 1881. While at Oxford Buck was a successful rower. He was on the staff as an assistant master at Bedford School between 1879 and 1894 but continued rowing for Oxford. He rowed in the winning Oxford crew in the 1881 Boat Race. He was also a member of the Hertford crew that won the Stewards' Challenge Cup at Henley Royal Regatta in the same year. He repeated his success in 1882 when he was in the winning Oxford crew in the Boat Race again and in the winning Hertford crew in Stewards. In 1888 he won Silver Goblets at Henley partnering Noel Symonds.

In 1895 Buck went to Barbados where he spent two years as headmaster of The Lodge School. In 1899 back in England he became assistant master at St Edmund's School in Canterbury. In 1902 he moved to Christ's Hospital at Horsham.

== See also ==
- List of Oxford University Boat Race crews
