= Henry Chapman (rower) =

English rower

Henry Chapman was an English 19th century rower who four times won the Wingfield Sculls, the amateur championship of the River Thames.

Chapman lived in London and rowed as a member of Crescent Club. He first competed in the Wingfield Sculls in 1838 when the event was won by H Wood. Chapman won the event in 1839 against C Pollock and Crockford. However, in 1840 he was away in Boulogne because he was suffering from ill-health and so he could not compete. He lost the event in 1841 to Thomas Lowten Jenkins after he suffered a rheumatic attack. However he won the Wingfield Sculls in 1842 and 1843 when he beat S Wallace. In 1844 he lost to Thomas Bumpsted but reversed the result in 1845. Also in 1845 he competed at Henley Royal Regatta when he came third in the Diamond Challenge Sculls behind S Wallace and J W Conant, and runner up in Silver Wherries partnering E G Peacock.

In 1848 Chapman was signatory to the revised rules of the Wingfields Sculls which changed the course, outlawed fouling and specified umpiring arrangements. Other signatories were Patrick Colquhoun, John Walmisley and Thomas Howard Fellows.
