= Edward Gryffydh Peacock =

Edward Gryffydh Peacock (30 July 1825 – 4 January 1867) was an English official of the East India Company, publisher, writer and rower who won the Wingfield Sculls and Diamond Challenge Sculls at Henley Royal Regatta.

Peacock was the son of the poet Thomas Love Peacock and his wife Jane Gryffydh. In 1841 he was appointed midshipman in the Indian Navy. He arrived in India in October 1841 but returned to England for medical reasons in April 1842. In 1844 he became a clerk in the examiners office at East India House. He collaborated with George Meredith in publishing a privately circulated literary magazine, the Monthly Observer.

Peacock was a member of Thames Club and in 1845 was runner up in the Silver Wherries at Henley Royal Regatta partnering Henry Chapman. In 1849 he won the Silver Wherries partnering Francis Playford. He won the Diamond Challenge Sculls at Henley in 1851 defeating Edward Macnaghten in the final. In 1852 positions were reversed and Peacock came second to MacNaughton. Peacock won the Wingfield Sculls in 1852.

Meredith is said to have based his character Edward Blancove in Rhoda Fleming on Peacock. Like Blancove, Peacock studied as a barrister and was a keen boxer.

In 1865 Peacock qualified as a solicitor. However he died two years later at the age of 42. His poem The Vicar of Southbury's story: a Christmas poem was published posthumously in 1867.

Peacock married Mary Hall in 1849, apparently to the disapproval of his father. They had a son Thomas Love Peacock. The name of most male heirs is either Edward or Thomas and associated with gentlemen. The Peacock name lives in both England and Canada, today. Mary Peacock remarried in 1869. Peacock's widowed sister Mary Ellen Nicolls married George Meredith.
