= Doug Melvin (rower) =

British rower (1928–2021)

Douglas V Melvin (born 1928, died 5 May 2021) was a British rower who twice won the Wingfield Sculls, the amateur sculling championship of the River Thames.

Melvin was born at Lancaster. He took a job there with the Electricity Board, and was working there and rowing for John O'Gaunt Rowing Club when he won the Wingfield Sculls in 1955. He was encouraged by Eric Phelps to join London Rowing Club and was able to transfer his Electricity Board job to Wandsworth in order to do so. This gave him the opportunity to train alongside other notable scullers at the club including Farn Carpmael, John Marsden, Tony Fox and John Pinches. In the Diamond Challenge Sculls in 1955 he reached the semi-final where he met Teodor Kocerka, the eventual winner. He went on to represent Great Britain in the single sculls at the European Championships later the same year. In 1956 he was selected as the spare man for the Great Britain team for the 1956 Summer Olympics in Melbourne. After his boat and blades were shipped off to the Games he was de-selected in favour of someone more inclined to rowing rather than sculling. Later in 1956, he became the first winner of the Weybridge Silver Sculls. In 1957 he won the Scullers Head of the River Race and 1958, the Wingfield Sculls again.

In 1960 Melvin retired from competitive rowing to concentrate on his career. However he became a coach and a GB selector. In later years he returned to competitive rowing as a veteran oarsman and sculler. In 2000 he was elected President of London Rowing Club and held the office for four years. He was the President of John O'Gaunt Rowing Club from 1966 to 2009.
