= Katharine Colquhoun =

British novelist

- Born: 1787
- Died: 1871
- Occupation: Novelist
- Spouse: James Colquhoun
- Children: Patrick Colquhoun, James Charles Henry Colquhoun

Katharine Colquhoun (1787 – 1871) was a British novelist.

Katharine Deacon was born in 1787, the youngest daughter of James Deacon, a customs receiver-general at the port of London, and Frances Colyns Deacon. In 1810, she married James Colquhoun, a British diplomat who represented a number of German governments and islands in the West Indies. They had three sons and two daughters, including the diplomats Patrick Colquhoun and James Charles Henry Colquhoun. She published a single novel, a work of historical fiction about Maurice, Elector of Saxony and dedicated to Frederick Augustus II of Saxony. She died in 1871.

== Bibliography ==
- Maurice, the Elector of Saxony: An Historical Romance of the Sixteenth Century. 3 vol. London: T. C. Newby, 1844.
