= Thomas Lowten Jenkins =

English barrister and rower

Thomas Lowten Jenkins (1812–1869) was an English barrister and rower who twice won the Wingfield Sculls, the amateur championship of the River Thames.

Jenkins was called to bar at Inner Temple in 1837. He joined Leander Club and in 1839 competed in the Wingfield Sculls when he lost to Henry Chapman. However he won in a rowover in 1840 when Chapman was unable to compete for health reasons. Also in 1840 he rowed number 5 in the Leander eight which won the Grand Challenge Cup at Henley Royal Regatta. He won the Wingfield Sculls again in 1841. In 1847 he umpired the Boat Race.

Jenkins then went to India in the legal service and became Master in Equity in the Supreme Court until the end of 1858. Back in England he lived at Wraxall House Somerset and in 1860 became a member of council for Clifton College.

Jenkins died in London at the age of 57.

Jenkins married Emily Feliza Vaughan, youngest daughter of Charles Vaughan of Clifton Gloucestershire in Bombay on 16 June 1849.
