= Withymead Nature Reserve =

Nature reserve in Oxfordshire, England

Coordinates: 51.5405°N 1.1355°W

Withymead Nature Reserve is a 13-acre (5.3 ha) site on the banks of the River Thames near Goring-on-Thames, Oxfordshire. The nature reserve is managed by the Anne Carpmael Charitable Trust, and aims to provide a haven for wildlife and inspiration to visitors.

== Location ==
The site is located at grid reference grid reference SU600827, on the eastern bank of the river Thames, roughly 1.2 miles (1.9 km) north of Goring village centre, and is bordered by the railway line to the west. The village of South Stoke lies roughly half a mile to the north.

== Description ==
Centred on the cottage originally owned by Anne Carpmael, the site comprises a tree-lined length of riverbank, reed-fen, and woodland area. The site is accessible via maintained paths and boardwalks, and includes three hides from which to unobtrusively and comfortably watch the wildlife. Evidence of Saunders Boatyard can also be seen in the form of two slipways, among other artifacts including tracks and wagon apparatus which was used to launch the boats.

== Flora and fauna ==
Withymead’s signature flower is the Loddon lily, which can be seen throughout April and May. The site also boasts Star of Bethlehem, cuckoo plant, ragged robin, yellow iris, and red and white campion.

The site is also home to muntjac and roe deer, as well as badgers and foxes.

Indigenous birds include coots, moorhens, red kites, and buzzards. Winter visitors include lesser redpolls and bramblings.

The reserve also plays host to many invertebrate species, and is a particular haven for Desmoulin's whorl snail.

== History ==
The area surrounding the cottage was once Saunders Boatyard, which was founded in 1870 by Cornelius Saunders, and moved to the Withymead site in 1882.

Anne Carpmael and her first husband, Jock Wise, initially bought the cottage at Withymead as a holiday retreat. Anne added to the size of the site by buying up surrounding land as it became available, resulting in the 22 acres which the trust manages today. Anne lived at Withymead for over 60 years, during which time the site provided habitat for local fauna and flora.

== See also ==
- Goring-on-Thames
- Farn Carpmael
- South Stoke, Oxfordshire
