= Charles Lewis (sculler) =

English rower

Charles Lewis (died 1863) was an English rower who was twice winner of the Wingfield Sculls, the amateur sculling championship of the River Thames.

Lewis was an early member of Leander Club and competed unsuccessfully for the Wingfield sculls in the first race in 1830. He beat the champion James Bayford in the 1831 race. He was defeated by A. A. Julius in 1832, but won the championship back from him in 1833.
