= A. A. Julius =

English rower

Alfred Alexander Julius (4 September 1812 – 1865) was an English rower who achieved notable success in the sport, winning the Wingfield Sculls three times, a title which represents the amateur sculling championship of the River Thames.

Julius was born at Richmond on Thames, the son of George Charles Julius and Isabella Maria Gilder. His father hailed from Nichola Town, St Kitts, West Indies. In 1832, Julius made his mark in rowing by challenging and defeating the reigning Wingfield Sculls champion, Charles Lewis. Although Lewis regained the title in 1833, Julius's dominance in the sport became evident as he went unchallenged in 1834 and 1835, securing victories through row-overs, a situation where no other competitors come forward to race.

Julius died in the Richmond district at the age of 43.

In 1844, Julius married Eliza Alexander, the daughter of Major General James Alexander of the East India Company, at St Marylebone. The couple had a daughter, Ada, who later married Sir Charles Layard, the Government Agent of the Western Province of Ceylon.
