= Wingfield Sculls =

British rowing event

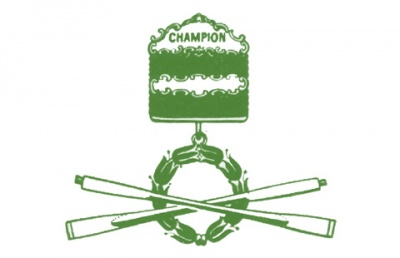

Event information
- Discipline: Single sculls (men's and women's)
- Location: Championship Course, River Thames, London, England
- Distance: 4.25 miles (6.8 km)
- Frequency: Annual
- Years active: 1830–present
- First held: 10 August 1830 (men); 1929, revived 2007 (women)
- Next race: 31 October 2027
- Website: wingfieldsculls.com

Most recent (2026)
- Date: 25 October 2026
- Men's champion: George Bourne
- Women's champion: Imogen Grant

Records
- Most wins (men): Jack Beresford (7; 1920–26)
- Most wins (women): Imogen Grant (5; 2022-26)
- Course record (men): 19:41, Adam Freeman-Pask (2011)
- Course record (women): 20:55, Anna Watkins (2011)

The Wingfield Sculls is a rowing race held annually on the River Thames in London, England, on the 4 1/4 miles (6.8 km) Championship Course from Putney to Mortlake. Winning the race brings with it the titles of Champion of the Thames and British Amateur Champion as well as Champion of the Wingfield Sculls.

The race is between single scullers and is usually on the last Sunday in October, one week after the Head of the Charles. Due to tide changes on the Tideway, the race may occasionally race in the opposite direction, to retain the same date on the calendar.

== History ==
The race was founded on 10 August 1830, at the instigation of barrister Henry Colsell Wingfield. The idea for the race was suggested at a dinner after a sculling race and following this a subscription dinner was held at the Swan in Battersea, where money was raised to fund the event, the rules were decided and a date was set.

The initial conditions were that the race should be run on the half tide from Westminster to Putney against all challengers, annually on 10 August forever (10 August being Wingfield's birthday), though the first race actually went from the Red House, Battersea to Hammersmith.

The Wingfield Sculls, the Diamond Challenge Sculls at Henley Royal Regatta and the London Cup in the Metropolitan Regatta made up the "Triple Crown" of the three premier men's amateur single sculling events in the United Kingdom.

Following the first Wingfield Sculls race, a separate Championship of the Thames for professional scullers was held for the first time in October 1831, which ceased in 1957 due to a decline in prize purses from betting in the sport and on the merger of the 'amateur' and 'professional'/'manual trade' former class-based categories of rowers.

=== Henry Wingfield ===
Henry Colsell Wingfield, born 1805, an Old Westminster, married Jane Nicholls in Margate, Kent in 1828. Henry Wingfield ("the First" of 3 Henrys) was the grandson of a rich hatter (felt hats), the son of an attorney and was raised at St James's Parish, Westminster.

He and Jane lived at 37 Great Marlborough Street near Oxford Circus — now rebuilt as a Coffee Republic and O'Neill's Irish Bar. They had two children. In 1842 Jane divorced Henry for adultery. Henry stayed long enough to bury his beloved daughter Emma 10 months later, in a new grand family grave at Kensal Green, Kensington and then emigrated to Prince Edward County — now part of Canada — which juts into Lake Ontario.

He farmed near Picton near South Marysburgh for 20 years, sometimes visiting England. In 1861, Henry Wingfield sold his farm and — wishing to spend his last days in England, embarked for Liverpool. At noon on 4 June 1861, 4 miles off the north point of Newfoundland in fog, his ship, the SS Canadian, struck an iceberg and the Wingfield Sculls founder and about 30 others of the passengers and crew of 300 succumbed to the cold and waves of the Atlantic Ocean.

== Men's Race ==
Date	Winner	Club	Time	Course
1830	J. H. Bayford	Trinity Hall, Cambridge	NTT	Battersea to Hammersmith
1831	C. Lewis	London	NTT	Westminster to Putney
1832	A. A. Julius	Leander Club	NTT	Westminster to Putney
1833	C. Lewis	London	NTT	Westminster to Putney
1834	A. A. Julius	Leander Club	NTT	Westminster to Putney
1835	A. A. Julius	Leander Club	NTT	Westminster to Putney
1836	H.Wood	London	NTT	Westminster to Putney
1837	P. Colquhoun	St John's College, Cambridge	38.30	Westminster to Putney
1838	H.Wood	Leander Club	NTT	Westminster to Putney
1839	H. Chapman	Crescent Club, London	NTT	Westminster to Putney
1840	T.L.Jenkins	Leander Club	Row Over	Westminster to Putney
1841	T.L.Jenkins	Leander Club	NTT	Westminster to Putney
1842	H. Chapman	Crescent Club, London	NTT	Westminster to Putney
1843	H. Chapman	Crescent Club, London	NTT	Westminster to Putney
1844	T.B.Bumpsted	Scullers' Club, London	NTT	Westminster to Putney
1845	H. Chapman	Crescent Club, London	NTT	Westminster to Putney
1846	W.Russell		NTT	Westminster to Putney
1847	J. R. L. Walmisley	Thames Club	NTT	Westminster to Putney
1848	J. R. L. Walmisley	Thames Club	Row Over	Westminster to Putney
1849	F. Playford	Thames Club	NTT	Putney to Kew
1850	T. R. Bone	Meteor Club	Row Over	Putney to Kew
1851	T. R. Bone	Thames Club	Row Over	Putney to Kew
1852	E G Peacock	Thames Club	Row Over	Putney to Kew
1853	J. Paine	Argonaut Club	NTT	Putney to Kew
1854	H. H. Playford	Wandle Club, London	Row Over	Putney to Kew
1855	A. A. Casamajor	Wandle Club, London	NTT	Putney to Kew
1856	A. A. Casamajor	Argonaut Club	Row Over	Putney to Kew
1857	A. A. Casamajor	London Rowing Club	Row Over	Putney to Kew
1858	A. A. Casamajor	London Rowing Club	Row Over	Putney to Kew
1859	A. A. Casamajor	London Rowing Club	Row Over	Putney to Kew
1860	A. A. Casamajor	London Rowing Club	Row Over	Putney to Kew
1861	E. D. Brickwood	London Rowing Club	29.52	Putney to Mortlake
1862	W. B. Woodgate	Brasenose College, Oxford	27.00	Putney to Mortlake
1863	J. E. Parker	University College, Oxford	Row Over	Putney to Mortlake
1864	W. B. Woodgate	Brasenose College, Oxford	25.22	Putney to Mortlake
1865	C. B. Lawes	Third Trinity, Cambridge	27.04	Putney to Mortlake
1866	E. B. Michell	Magdalen College, Oxford	27.36	Putney to Mortlake
1867	W. B. Woodgate	Oxford Radleian Club	Row Over	Putney to Mortlake
1868	W. Stout	London Rowing Club	26.40	Putney to Mortlake
1869	A. de L. Long	London Rowing Club	Row Over	Putney to Mortlake
1870	A. de L. Long	London Rowing Club	27.16	Putney to Mortlake
1871	W. Fawcus	Tynemouth Rowing Club	26.13	Putney to Mortlake
1872	C. C. Knollys	Magdalen College, Oxford	27.15	Putney to Mortlake
1873	A. C. Dicker	Lady Margaret BC, Cambridge	24.40	Putney to Mortlake
1874	A. C. Dicker	Lady Margaret BC, Cambridge	25.45	Putney to Mortlake
1875	F. L. Playford	London Rowing Club	27.08	Putney to Mortlake
1876	F. L. Playford	London Rowing Club	24.46	Putney to Mortlake
1877	F. L. Playford	London Rowing Club	26.03	Putney to Mortlake
1878	F. L. Playford	London Rowing Club	24.41	Putney to Mortlake
1879	F. L. Playford	London Rowing Club	24.13	Putney to Mortlake
1880	A. Payne	Molesey Boat Club	25.50	Putney to Mortlake
1881	J. Lowndes	Derby School	25.13	Putney to Mortlake
1882	A. Payne	Molesey Boat Club	27.40	Putney to Mortlake
1883	J. Lowndes	Twickenham Rowing Club	Row Over	Putney to Mortlake
1884	W. S. Unwin	Magdalen College, Oxford	24.12	Putney to Mortlake
1885	W. S. Unwin	Magdalen College, Oxford	?	Putney to Mortlake
1886	F.I.Pitman	Third Trinity, Cambridge	24.12	Putney to Mortlake
1887	G. Nickalls	Magdalen College, Oxford	25.23	Putney to Mortlake
1888	G. Nickalls	Magdalen College, Oxford	23.36	Putney to Mortlake
1889	G. Nickalls	Magdalen College, Oxford	Row Over	Putney to Mortlake
1890	J. C. Gardner	Cambridge University BC	26.20	Putney to Mortlake
1891	G. Nickalls	Leander Club	Row Over	Putney to Mortlake
1892	V. Nickalls	Magdalen College, Oxford	23.40	Putney to Mortlake
1893	G. E. B. Kennedy	Kingston Rowing Club	24.56	Putney to Mortlake
1894	V. Nickalls	Magdalen College, Oxford	27.30	Putney to Mortlake
1895	V. Nickalls	London Rowing Club	25.06	Putney to Mortlake
1896	R. Guinness	Leander Club	24.10	Putney to Mortlake
1897	H. T. Blackstaffe	Vesta RC	23.58	Putney to Mortlake
1898	B. H. Howell	Trinity Hall, Cambridge	22.56	Putney to Mortlake
1899	B. H. Howell	Thames Rowing Club	23.07	Putney to Mortlake
1900	C. V. Fox	Guards Brigade RC	22.54	Putney to Mortlake
1901	H. T. Blackstaffe	Vesta RC	24.16	Putney to Mortlake
1902	A. H. Cloutte	London Rowing Club	24.32	Putney to Mortlake
1903	F. S. Kelly	Leander Club	23.32	Putney to Mortlake
1904	St.G.Ashe	London Rowing Club	23.25	Putney to Mortlake
1905	H. T. Blackstaffe	Vesta RC	25.17	Putney to Mortlake
1906	H. T. Blackstaffe	Vesta RC	23.10	Putney to Mortlake
1907	John de Greet Edye	Auriol RC	23.51	Putney to Mortlake
1908	H. T. Blackstaffe	Vesta RC	24.48	Putney to Mortlake
1909	A. A. Stuart	Kingston Rowing Club	26.06	Putney to Mortlake
1910	W.D. Kinnear	Kensington RC	23.12	Putney to Mortlake
1911	W.D. Kinnear	Kensington RC	Row Over	Putney to Mortlake
1912	W.D. Kinnear	Kensington RC	23.51	Putney to Mortlake
1913	C. W. Wise	London Rowing Club	24.12	Putney to Mortlake
1914	J.L.Tann	Thames Rowing Club	23.39	Putney to Mortlake
1915–19	no races			
1920	Jack Beresford	Thames Rowing Club	23.14	Putney to Mortlake
1921	Jack Beresford	Thames Rowing Club	24.44	Putney to Mortlake
1922	Jack Beresford	Thames Rowing Club	22.13	Putney to Mortlake
1923	Jack Beresford	Thames Rowing Club	24.27	Putney to Mortlake
1924	Jack Beresford	Thames Rowing Club	24.36	Putney to Mortlake
1925	Jack Beresford	Thames Rowing Club	23.27	Putney to Mortlake
1926	Jack Beresford	Thames Rowing Club	22.25	Putney to Mortlake
1927	David Collet	Leander Club	23.10	Putney to Mortlake
1928	David Collet	Leander Club	23.00	Putney to Mortlake
1929	David Collet	Leander Club	21.47	Putney to Mortlake
1930	Denis Guye	London Rowing Club	23.50	Putney to Mortlake
1931	Denis Guye	London Rowing Club	NTT	Putney to Mortlake
1932	Denis Guye	London Rowing Club	21.01	LRC to Mortlake (Putney Bridge being repaired)
1933	Dick Southwood	Thames Rowing Club	21.11	LRC to Mortlake (Putney Bridge being repaired)
1934	Cuthbert Buckle	London Rowing Club	22.21	Putney to Mortlake
1935	Peter H. Jackson	London Rowing Club	22.06	Putney to Mortlake
1936	Peter H. Jackson	London Rowing Club	22.31	Putney to Mortlake
1937	Ralph Hope	Thames Rowing Club	21.44	Putney to Mortlake
1938	Peter H. Jackson	London Rowing Club	22.40	Putney to Mortlake
1939–45	no races			
1946	Dickie Burnell	Leander Club	22.36	Putney to Mortlake
1947	Bert Bushnell	Maidenhead Rowing Club	22.14	Putney to Mortlake
1948	Farn Carpmael	London Rowing Club	25.45	Putney to Mortlake
1949	Farn Carpmael	London Rowing Club	22.55	Putney to Mortlake
1950	Edward Sturges	London Rowing Club	22.07	Putney to Mortlake
1951	Tony Fox	Pembroke College, Cambridge	22.14	Putney to Mortlake
1952	Tony Fox	London Rowing Club	24.33	Putney to Mortlake
1953	Tony Fox	London Rowing Club	22.30	Putney to Mortlake
1954	Sidney Rand	Royal Air Force	24.43	Putney to Mortlake
1955	Doug Melvin	John o'Gaunt Rowing Club	22.05	Putney to Mortlake
1956	John Marsden	London Rowing Club	25.33	Putney to Mortlake
1957	Graham Beech	London Rowing Club	22.57	Putney to Mortlake
1958	Doug Melvin	London Rowing Club	22.12	Putney to Mortlake
1959	John Russell	London Rowing Club	22.37	Putney to Mortlake
1960	George Justicz	Birmingham Rowing Club	24.41	Putney to Mortlake
1961	Robert Carpmael	London Rowing Club	23.50	Putney to Mortlake
1962	Charlie Dearsley	Poplar and Blackwall RC	23.57	Putney to Mortlake
1963	William L. Barry	Quintin Boat Club	23.30	Putney to Mortlake
1964	William L. Barry	Quintin Boat Club	25.50	Putney to Mortlake
1965	William L. Barry	Quintin Boat Club	23.06	Putney to Mortlake
1966	William L. Barry	Quintin Boat Club	25.22	Putney to Mortlake
1967	Nick Cooper	London Rowing Club	24.00	Putney to Mortlake
1968	Kenny Dwan	Poplar and Blackwall RC	23.39	Putney to Mortlake
1969	Kenny Dwan	Poplar and Blackwall RC	23.21	Putney to Mortlake
1970	Kenny Dwan	Poplar and Blackwall RC	23.51	Putney to Mortlake
1971	Kenny Dwan	Poplar and Blackwall RC	23.45	Putney to Mortlake
1972	Kenny Dwan	Poplar and Blackwall RC	21.59	Putney to Mortlake
1973	David Sturge	London Rowing Club	21.50	Putney to Mortlake
1974	David Sturge	Lady Margaret	21.24	Putney to Mortlake
1975	Kenny Dwan	Poplar and Blackwall RC	24.16	Putney to Mortlake
1976	Graeme Mulcahy	Quintin Boat Club	22.20	Putney to Mortlake
1977	Tim Crooks	Leander Club	24.13	Putney to Mortlake
1978	Tim Crooks	Leander Club	22.37	Putney to Mortlake
1979	Malcolm Carmichael	Leander Club	24.55	Putney to Mortlake
1980	Tim Crooks	Leander Club	23.27	Putney to Mortlake
1981	Chris Baillieu	Leander Club	22.05	Putney to Mortlake
1982	Chris Baillieu	Leander Club	22.01	Putney to Mortlake
1983	Chris Baillieu	Leander Club	23.08	Putney to Mortlake
1984	Chris Baillieu	Leander Club	22.14	Putney to Mortlake
1985	Steve Redgrave	Marlow Rowing Club	21.40	Putney to Mortlake
1986	Steve Redgrave	Marlow Rowing Club	23.04	Putney to Mortlake
1987	Steve Redgrave	Marlow Rowing Club	21.41	Putney to Mortlake
1988	Steve Redgrave	Marlow Rowing Club	21.01	Putney to Mortlake
1989	Steve Redgrave	Marlow Rowing Club	20.16	Putney to Mortlake
1990	Rorie Henderson	Leander Club	20.23	Putney to Mortlake
1991	Guy Pooley	Leander Club	20.3	Putney to Mortlake
1992	Guy Pooley	Leander Club	22.04	Putney to Mortlake
1993	Wade Hall-Craggs	Tideway Scullers School	21.13	Putney to Mortlake
1994	Peter Haining	Auriol Kensington	19.58	Putney to Mortlake
1995	Peter Haining	Auriol Kensington	21.01	Putney to Mortlake
1996	Peter Haining	Auriol Kensington	22.03	Putney to Mortlake
1997	Martin Kettle	Queen's Tower	20.29	Putney to Mortlake
1998	Greg Searle	Molesey Boat Club	20.44	Putney to Mortlake
1999	Greg Searle	Molesey Boat Club	21.56	Putney to Mortlake
2000	Peter Haining	Auriol Kensington	22.27	Putney to Mortlake
2000	Greg Searle	Molesey Boat Club	22.21	Putney to Mortlake
2001	Ian Lawson	Leander Club	21.41	Putney to Mortlake
2002	Ian Lawson	Leander Club	26.13	Putney to Mortlake
2003	Ian Lawson	Leander Club	20.13	Putney to Mortlake
2004	Matthew Wells	Leander Club	21.52	Putney to Mortlake
2005	Matthew Wells	Leander Club	23.14	Putney to Mortlake
2006	Alan Campbell	Tideway Scullers School	22.48	Putney to Mortlake
2007	Mahé Drysdale	Tideway Scullers School	Row Over	Putney to Mortlake
2008	Mahé Drysdale	Tideway Scullers School	21.14	Putney to Mortlake
2009	Alan Campbell	Tideway Scullers School	20.27	Putney to Mortlake
2010	Alan Campbell	Tideway Scullers School	22.34	Putney to Mortlake
2011	Adam Freeman-Pask	Imperial College	19.41 (record)	Putney to Mortlake
2012	Alan Campbell	Tideway Scullers School	24.00	Putney to Mortlake
2013	Alan Campbell	Tideway Scullers School	21.15	Putney to Mortlake
2014	Tim Richards	Imperial College	21.06	Putney to Mortlake
2015	Tim Richards	Imperial College	21.40	Putney to Mortlake
2016	Jamie Kirkwood	Leander Club	20:56	Putney to Mortlake
2017	Rich Clarke	University of London Boat Club	22:03	Putney to Mortlake
2018	Charles Cousins	Griffen Boat Club	21:57	Putney to Mortlake
2019	Sam Meijer	Tideway Scullers School	20.35	Putney to Mortlake
2020	Matt Haywood	Nottingham Rowing Club	17.04	Hammersmith to Kew
2021	Graeme Thomas	Agecroft Rowing Club	28.04	Putney to Mortlake
2022	Seb Devereux	Leander Club		Putney to Mortlake
2023	Joshua Lyon	Reading University Boat Club	23.48	Putney to Mortlake
2024	Callum Dixon	Twickenham Rowing Club		Chiswick to Putney
2025	George Bourne	Leander Club		Putney to Mortlake
2026	George Bourne	Leander Club		Putney to Mortlake

== Women's race ==
The 2007 event on 25 October saw the revival of the women's championship which, except for the years between 1939 and 1948, had been an annual event from 1929 until the early 1970s, when the Women's Amateur Rowing Association amalgamated with the ARA.

The Wingfield Family Society have been involved with the Wingfield Sculls for the last 10 years (and a few years ago presented the Wingfield Sculls Committee with a new flag). It has also funded and presented a silver Trophy – based on Henry Wingfield's original 1830 Trophy – for the revived Women's Race.

The closest living relative to Henry Wingfield, Clare Morton (the g-g-great-granddaughter of Henry's Uncle John Wingfield) presented both the trophy to the winner of the 2007 race, Elise Laverick (Thames RC), and a framed montage of extracts about the "Life of the Wingfield Sculls Founder" to Wade Hall-Craggs, the Honorary Secretary of the Wingfield Sculls Committee.

Results

Date	Winner	Club	Time	Course
2007	Elise Laverick	Thames Rowing Club	21.53	Putney to Mortlake
2008	Sophie Hosking	London Rowing Club	22.05	Putney to Mortlake
2009	Sophie Hosking	London Rowing Club	23.05	Putney to Mortlake
2010	Anna Bebington	Leander Club	23.07	Putney to Mortlake
2011	Anna Watkins	Leander Club	20.55 (record)	Putney to Mortlake
2012	Beth Rodford	Gloucester Rowing Club	23.32	Putney to Mortlake
2013	Imogen Walsh	London Rowing Club	21.44	Putney to Mortlake
2014	Melanie Wilson	Imperial College	21.31	Putney to Mortlake
2015	Mathilda Hodgkins-Byrne	Reading Rowing Club	21.54	Putney to Mortlake
2016	Jessica Leyden	Leander Club	22:32	Putney to Mortlake
2017	Fran Rawlins	Tideway Scullers School	22:54	Putney to Mortlake
2018	Ruth Siddorn	Leander Club	22:29	Putney to Mortlake
2019	Jessica Leyden	Leander Club	22:30	Putney to Mortlake
2020	Mathilda Hodgkins-Byrne	Reading Rowing Club	17.11	Hammersmith to Kew
2021	Lola Anderson	Leander Club		Putney to Mortlake
2022	Imogen Grant	Cambridge University Boat Club		Putney to Mortlake
2023	Imogen Grant	Cambridge University Boat Club		Putney to Mortlake
2024	Imogen Grant	Cambridge University Boat Club		Chiswick to Putney
2025	Imogen Grant	Upper Thames Rowing Club		Putney to Mortlake
2026	Imogen Grant	Upper Thames Rowing Club		Putney to Mortlake

The last champion to win a hat trick on the Tideway was Imogen Grant, who holds the current title.

== See also ==
- Rowing on the River Thames
