= James Bayford =

English rower

James Heseltine Bayford (30 December 1804 – 22 October 1871) was an English rower who was the first winner of the Wingfield Sculls, the amateur sculling championship of the River Thames.

Bayford was the son of John Bayford, a London magistrate, and his wife Frances who lived in the region of St Pancras London. He was educated at Trinity Hall, Cambridge where he became a proficient rower. Bayford won the Wingfield Sculls in 1830 against seven challengers but lost in the following year to Charles Lewis.

Bayford became an attorney and notary, of 7 Godliman Street, London. He died at Chelsea at the age of 66.

Bayford married Rose Bright at Brighton in November 1834. His brother Augustus Fredrick Bayford rowed for Cambridge in the first Boat Race of 1829.
