= University of York Boat Club =

British rowing club

- Location: York
- Home water: River Ouse
- Founded: 1963
- Key people: James Maiklem (President) Ella Mabbutt (Vice President) Esme Redmond (Secretary) Ned Goodrich (Treasurer) Daisy Waters (Training Coordinator) Alex McCrae (Senior Men's Captain) Keira Brueton (Senior Women's Captain) Erin Sanders and Harry Thomas (Novice Men's Captains) Lauren Mutch and Christie Morrow (Novice Women's Captains) Keela Webster and Ben Page (YURow Captain) Sophia Leigh-Hunt (Coxswain’s Officer)
- University: University of York
- Colours: Black and Gold, York Blue
- Affiliations: British Rowing; BUCS
- Website: www.universityofyorkboatclub.com
- Acronym: UYO

Events
- Roses Tournament; White Rose Head

The University of York Boat Club (UYBC) is the rowing club of the University of York. It was founded in 1963 by Richard Miles. The club's boathouse is located along the River Ouse in Fulford, York, North Yorkshire, United Kingdom.

The club is composed of five squads: Senior Women, Senior Men, Novice Women, Novice Men, and YURow, a development of the former 'White Rose' staff and community club into an inclusive development environment to both University members and the wider community.

The boat club was a GB Start centre until 2021, and in 2016 was the university's largest mixed-gender sports club on campus, with over 200 members and a membership more than 50% female.

== History ==
The Boat Club was founded in October 1963 during the first month of activity of the newly established university. It was first hosted by York City Rowing Club which allowed the students to use their equipment for no charge. In March 1965, the club entered its first competition: The Yorkshire Head of the River which took place in York. The Vice-Chancellor of the university, Lord James Rusholme suggested a boat race between the Lancaster University Boat Club and the University of York. The first Roses Boat Race was competed on 15 May 1965 and was won by York. This boat race has since evolved in the Roses tournament competed every year by sports teams across both universities.

The club fundraises annually, both for charities such as Movember, and to fund itself. Fundraising events have included a 24-hour sponsored row on an ergometer and a world record attempt for the longest continual row on an ergometer. In 2016 the club became the first UK university boat club to introduce an LGBT policy, promoting it by adopting rainbow-coloured Wellington boots.

The club has competed at Henley Royal Regatta, most recently qualifying for the Temple Challenge Cup in 2011, 2017, 2021 and 2023. The senior women's squad has been similarly attended Henley Women's Regatta, qualifying for the main draw in June 2022 in ninth, beating international and domestic crews.

== Committee ==
The club is entirely run by the students. The committee is elected each year in May. The committee comprises several club signatories and other roles such as Novice captains, Safety and Wellbeing officers, Social secretaries and a Development team.

== Kit and Blades ==
The club used "York" blue as its colour until the sports union unification in 2012, at which point the official colours changed to black and gold. As of 2025, the club has returned to racing in York blue to reflect its origins and history. The club's blade design is black with a white rose of York. The blazer of the club remains blue with white edging and bears a modified version of the crest of the university's arms (white rose of York with two crossed rowing oars behind it instead of the crossed keys of York).

== Races ==
The club partakes in various different races all around the academic year catering to those who are wanting to compete at various different levels. Throughout the winter the club partakes in Head Races such as York Autumn Sculls, Head of the Don, Fours Head, Rutherford and York Small Boats. After returning in the New Year the Club attends South Yorkshire Head, BUCS Head and both Women's Head of The River and Men's Head of The River.

The summer season consists of attending major events in the rowing calendar such as Durham Regatta, the Metropolitan Regatta, Marlow Regatta, Henley Women's Regatta and Henley Royal Regatta.

The club also used to have a race against York Saint John University Rowing Club, and traditionally run the White Rose Head, a three-kilometre head-to-head race from on the River Ouse, from the university boathouse and the Lowther pub.

== Jorvik B.C. ==
Jorvik B.C. is the university's alumni's boat club. It was founded in 2011 and holds a number of events each year for former and current club members. It boasts members of some of the biggest rowing clubs in the country and races under the traditional colours of the club. This is a vibrant community of people who have passed through the club at various points in its history and continues to welcome new members on an annual basis.

- An annual Jorvik Dinner held in one of the grand boathouses in South West London along the river Thames.
- The Henley Royal Regatta Picnic which is usually held the Saturday of the race each July.
- The Jorvik vs UYBC boat race, a 400m race between the two clubs held each April in Henley on Thames.

Blade of the Jorvik Boat Club

The Jorvik Boat Club uses the old club colour: the York Blue.
