= James Colquhoun (diplomat) =

British diplomat (1780–1855)

James Colquhoun (7 June 1780 – 23 July 1855) was a British diplomat who represented the interests of various German cities in Great Britain.

== Biography ==
He was the only son of Patrick Colquhoun, who became Lord Provost of Glasgow and was a pioneer of modern policing methods. He entered St John's College, Cambridge in 1797 but left in 1798.

He was private secretary to Henry Dundas in 1806. In 1809, he was Deputy Agent-General for the payment of volunteers organized under the Volunteer Act 1804 (44 Geo.3 c.54) for the defence of Britain in the Napoleonic Wars.

For the cities of Hamburg, Bremen and Lübeck he was Hanseatic Consul-General to Great Britain between 1817 and 1855, signing commercial treaties on their behalf not just with Britain but with various other countries. In 1827 he became the consul-general in the United Kingdom representing King Anton of Saxony, and in 1848, he was appointed by Augustus, Grand Duke of Oldenburg to be his chargé d'Affaires in London. He received the star of a Commander of the Royal Saxon Order of Civil Merit, and assumed the title of Chevalier de Colquhoun. At various times he also represented the interests of the legislatures of Saint Vincent and other West Indies islands.

He was elected a fellow of the University of Glasgow, from which he also received an honorary LL.D. degree.

He married Katharine Deacon and they had three sons and two daughters; their eldest son Patrick Colquhoun was a lawyer and a rower, and followed in his footsteps as a diplomat representing German cities.
