= William Hope (VC) =

Recipient of the Victoria Cross (1834–1909)

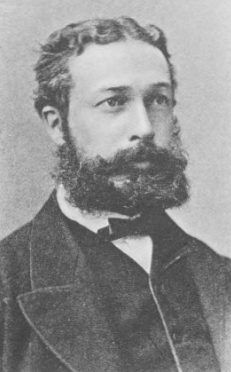
- Born: 12 April 1834; Edinburgh, Scotland
- Died: 17 December 1909 (aged 75); Chelsea, London, England
- Burial place: Brompton Cemetery
- Relatives: John Hope (father)
- Military career
- Allegiance: United Kingdom
- Branch: British Army
- Rank: Colonel
- Units: 7th Regiment of Foot
- Conflicts: Crimean War
- Awards: Victoria Cross; Medal of Military Valour (Sardinia)

Colonel William Hope VC (12 April 1834 – 17 December 1909) was a Scottish recipient of the Victoria Cross, the highest and most prestigious award for gallantry in the face of the enemy that can be awarded to British and Commonwealth forces.

William Hope was the son of the Right Honourable John Hope, Lord Chief Justice Clerk of Scotland, and his wife Jessie Irving, and was born in Edinburgh on 12 April 1834. He was educated privately and at Trinity College, Cambridge.

William Hope married Margaret Jane, daughter of Robert Cunningham Cunninghame Graham of Gartmore and aunt of the author, politician and traveller Robert Bontine Cunninghame Graham, by whom she had six children, the eldest of which was a son, Adrian, whose granddaughter, Lauretta Hope-Nicholson, was the second wife of the artist Jean Hugo.

== VC action ==
He was 21 years old, and a lieutenant in the 7th Regiment of Foot (later The Royal Fusiliers), British Army during the Crimean War when the following deed took place for which he was awarded the VC.

On 18 June 1855 at Sebastopol, Crimean Peninsula, Lieutenant Hope went to the assistance of the adjutant, who was lying outside the trenches badly wounded. Having found that it was impossible to move him, even with the help of four men, he ran back across the open ground under very heavy fire from the enemy batteries, and procured a stretcher to bring the wounded officer in.

He later achieved the rank of colonel. Hope invented a form of shrapnel shell for rifled guns, and later became an enthusiastic supporter of the volunteer movement, rising to the command of the 1st City of London Artillery Volunteers.

== The medal ==
His Victoria Cross is displayed at the Royal Fusiliers Museum in the Tower of London, England.

== Business ==
Following his military career, Hope was involved in a number of business ventures. In 1862 he was described as General Manager of the International Financial Society, and was also Director of the Lands Improvement Company, through which he had been involved in reclamation and irrigation work in Spain and Majorca. With William Napier, he proposed a scheme to convey sewage from the northern outfall of Joseph Bazalgette's London sewer system some 44-mile (71 km) across Essex to reclaim 20,000 acres (81 km^{2}) of land from Dengie Flats, and a similar area from Maplin Sands, off the shore of Foulness Island. The estimated cost of the project was £2.1 million, and although work started in 1865, a crisis in the banking system, when the Overend Gurney bank failed, made it difficult to obtain finance, and the scheme foundered.
