= John Laurence Tann =

English rower

John Laurence Tann (born 1890) was an English rower who won the Wingfield Sculls, the amateur single sculling championship of the River Thames, in 1914.

Tann was born at Holborn, the son of Edward Tann. The Tann family were the first in the business of manufacturing iron safes. Tann studied engineering at London University and entered the family safe business. He joined Thames Rowing Club and in 1914 won the Wingfield Sculls and the London Cup at the Metropolitan Regatta.

Tann was an Associate Member of the Institution of Civil Engineers and the Institute of Mechanical Engineers and obtained patents relating to safes. Tann was the last member of the family to run the safe making company, and having no male heir, sold the business in 1965.

Tann married Christine X Bevan at Wandsworth in 1916. His grandson Tim Crooks was an Olympic rower who also won the Wingfield Sculls.
