= Lancaster John O'Gaunt Rowing Club =

British rowing club

Coordinates: 54.06210°N 2.79545°W

- Motto: Gaunt to the fore
- Location: Skerton, United Kingdom
- Home water: River Lune
- Founded: 1842
- Affiliations: British Rowing Lancaster Rowing Development Group
- Website: lancasterrowing.co.uk

Events
- Lancaster City Regatta

Notable members
- Doug Melvin; Scott Durant; Mason Durant; Pauline Janson

Lancaster John O'Gaunt Rowing Club (JOG) is an English rowing club based at Lancaster on the River Lune. Its origins date back to 1842 making it the fifth oldest surviving rowing club in the United Kingdom outside the universities.

== History ==
Lancaster Rowing Club was first founded in 1842 by the architect and engineer Edmund Sharpe. with the help of his partner Edward Graham Paley.

Sharpe lived in one of the largest riverside houses at Halton Hall and owned two 4-oared cutters, the 'Ariadne' and the 'Lotus', which he made over to the new rowing club for £40 on 20 September 1842.

At the 1865 general election there were allegation of political bribery concerning members of the Lancaster Rowing Club. After a Royal Commission's investigation in 1867 the original Lancaster Rowing Club had ceased to exist and two new clubs were established: a new Lancaster Rowing Club (Tory) and John O'Gaunt Rowing Club (Liberal).

Up to 1876 the Lancaster Rowing Club, with subscriptions as high as £70 saw increasing success and the boathouse was paid for. However John O'Gaunt Rowing Club on the other side of the river was less successful and had to remove their boats from their building as rental was too high. It was then that James Williamson, 1st Baron Ashton a leader of Lancaster's newfound manufacturing prosperity, came to the rescue. He bought all the riverside property on part of which stood the boathouse and leased the land and building to the club for 2/6d. (12.5p) per annum.

By 1931 the fortunes of the two Clubs had reversed as the Lancaster RC building needed refurbishment and without the benefit of a benefactor the committee were 'unanimously of the opinion that under present conditions it is impossible to carry on'. The Lancaster Rowing Club then made all its stock available to JOG.

== Associated clubs and organisations ==
Lancaster Schools' Rowing Association (LSRA) was first founded in 2010. The club was formed to enhance the rowing provision available to under-18s in Lancaster and the surrounding area. Facilities, equipment and coaching staff would primarily be provided by JOG. In the first two years British Rowing, Henley Stewards' and Lancaster and Morecambe College provided additional coaching staff, this was later taken over by JOG. Partner schools would provide land-based facilities and recruitment opportunities.

Lancaster University Boat Club was first founded in 1964. They used JOG's facilities up until 1966 when they moved to the newly renovated station building at Halton.

Lancaster Royal Grammar School Boat Club (LRGSBC) was first founded in 1948. They were tenants of JOG from 1985 to 2011. In 2011 LRGSBC relocated to Halton Army Training Camp.

Lancaster Rowing Development Group was set up in 2014 with the primary aim of developing rowing in Lancaster. Organisations sitting on the group included:

- John O'Gaunt Rowing Club
- Lancaster Royal Grammar School
- Lancaster University Boat Club
- Lancaster Schools' Rowing Association
- Lancaster University
- Lancaster University Athletics' Union
- Lancaster City Council
- Lancashire Sports Partnership
- British Rowing

== Facilities ==
JOG has a boathouse located by Skerton.

On 5 December 2015 the building was flooded to the greatest extent in living memory (approximately 2 inches into the first floor). As a result of the flood considerable damage to boats meant that more than half of the fleet was either sent for repair or written off. By late 2016 the fleet was back up to full strength and works to improve the building were nearly completed. As a result of the flood a flood action plan was developed; this included storing boats off site from November to February and fast flood response to environment agency flood warnings.

== Members ==
Membership is open to all except for those that have been refused membership of British Rowing.

Honorary club members:

- Doug Melvin (two-time winner of the Wingfield Sculls)
- Scott Durant (U23, European Championships, World Cups, World Championships and Rio Olympic Olympic Gold Medalist)
- Mason Durant (U23, European Championships and World Cups)
- Pauline Jansen (President and 6th at 1980 Olympics in the Women's 4+)
- Neil Wigglesworth (long-time member and sports historian)
- Colin McDermid (long-time member)

== See also ==
- British Rowing
- Lancaster University Boat Club
- Lancaster Royal Grammar School
