= Tynemouth Rowing Club =

British rowing club

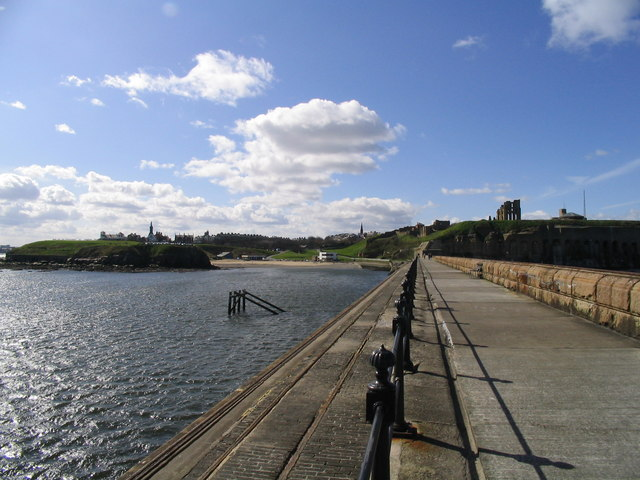

- Location: Tynemouth
- Coordinates: 55.016016°N 1.418527°W
- Home water: River Tyne estuary & North Sea
- Founded: 1867
- Affiliations: British Rowing (boat code TYM); Northern Rowing Council
- Website: tynemouthrowingclub.org.uk

Events
- Great Tyne Row

Notable members
- William Fawcus (b.1850)

Tynemouth Rowing Club (TRC) operates out of its clubhouse: the sandy cove of Priors Haven, Tynemouth, England.

== History ==
Tynemouth Rowing Club was founded in 1867 after members left Northern Rowing Club and is situated in Priors Haven by the North Pier at the entrance of the River Tyne. The club's colours reflect the two thin stripes of Royal Navy (#1A0076; 82% blue, 18% red) and otherwise: white.

The notable northern rower James Renforth was employed as a coach for Tynemouth RC in 1869. He was paid 3 guineas for two weeks work.

In 1871, the club had a victory at the Henley Royal Regatta, where William Fawcus won the Diamond Challenge Sculls. The club is the only open club from the North East to have won this event. William Fawcus also claimed victory in the Wingfield Sculls the same year. He was the first provincial sculler to win the Diamond Challenge Sculls at Henley and also the first to win the Wingfield Sculls.

In 2005, the club christened a new safety boat on its open day.

Since 2011, the club has hosted the finishing ceremony of the Great Tyne Row, which is an Explore Rowing event, rowed over 25 kilometres, starting at Newburn and ending at Tynemouth.

Chris Dixon, chairman of Tynemouth Rowing Club, said of the inaugural event, "This was a great opportunity for us to welcome rowers from across the country and to show off the wonderful experience rowers at our club get to enjoy."

== Honours ==
=== Henley Royal Regatta ===
Year	Races won
1871	Diamond Challenge Sculls
