= William Fawcus =

British rower

William Fawcus (born 10 October 1850) was a British rower and member of Tynemouth Rowing Club. He won the Wingfield Sculls and the Diamond Challenge Sculls at Henley Royal Regatta in 1871, being the first provincial competitor to do so.

Fawcus was born in Dockwray Square, North Shields, the son of John Fawcus and his wife Wilhelmina. His father worked in the family firm of Pow & Fawcus which manufactured chains and anchors. The earliest record of Fawcus is rowing at the age of 17 for Tynemouth Rowing Club 2nd crew at the Wear Boat Club regatta on 7 July 1868. In the "Four Oared Outriggers, 1¼ mile, open to Gentleman Amateurs, Prize – Gold Medals" the Tynemouth crew, in pink, comprising W. Fawcus, R. Park, S. Morrison T. Pickering, (stroke) and J. Gallon (cox) lost to the Wear Boat Club 2nd crew by 3 lengths. On Saturday 1 August 1868 at Tynemouth, Fawcus and G A Dodds won the 1st heat of the coxed junior pairs but lost the final to Eltringham and Bushell.

Fawcus became Champion of the Wear in 1870, winning the Oswald Plate. It is possible he was coached by James Renforth, who was engaged by Tynemouth RC at 30 shillings a week in May 1869. It is certain that he was coached by James Taylor who coached Tynemouth RC later in the summer of 1869 but also prepared members for the racing season of 1871. As well as being an outstanding sculler, Fawcus also stroked a successful Tynemouth Four. His younger brother R. F. Fawcus was a good oarsman too.

In 1871, at the age 20, Fawcus won the three premier events for amateur single scullers in Britain, rowing for Tynemouth RC. In the Diamond Challenge Sculls at Henley Royal Regatta he beat John Goldie of Lady Margaret Boat Club.

The local newspaper reported

"HENLEY ROYAL REGATTA – The concluding day's boat racing came off yesterday, in lovely weather and in the presence of a great number of spectators. For the Diamond Challenge Sculls, the result of the final heat was:- W.C. Fawcus, Tynemouth, 1; J.H.D. Goldie, Cambridge, 2; F. T. Ashby, Staines, 3. Considerable interest was felt in this race from the meeting of Mr. Goldie with an amateur sculler from the Tyne, this year being the first appearance of a representative of the northern men at Henley. Mr.Fawcus had the best station (on the Bucks side), Ashley was in the centre and Goldie on the Berks side. A beautifully level start was made, and for a few strokes the men were equal. Goldie and Fawcus then drew away from Ashley and took the race into their own hands. As soon as they had got fairly settled into their stroke Fawcus began to creep ahead inch-by-inch, every stroke telling, until at the end of the half mile he had placed fully a length to his credit. This lead was perceptibly and favourably increased on the voyage down to the finish, where Fawcus arrived a good three lengths before Goldie. Ashley caught his right hand scull in the reeds at Poplar Point and ceased sculling. Fawcus sculled in splendid style and won easily."

Fawcus was also in the Tynemouth RC crew comprising W Fawcus, G R Ramsay, J Morrison, J L Browne, cox J Greensit that lost to London Rowing Club in a heat of the Stewards Challenge Cup.

At the Metropolitan Regatta on 20 July Fawcus won the London Cup, and two days later won the Wingfield Sculls beating A. de L. Long captain of London Rowing Club by 1½ lengths in 26.13.

However at the Durham Regatta Fawcus ended up in the reeds. "Hardly had the pair gone fifty yards when Mr. Sinclair (of Tyne) commenced to row over towards Mr. Fawcus, and the latter attempting to keep out of his way struck the river bank with his right hand scull, and smashed the blade clean off. Of course, Mr. Sinclair then went in alone. There was some talk of an objection to the winner for boring on to Mr. Fawcus, but no formal protest was entered." Tynemouth RC (including Fawcus) won the Grand Challenge Cup at Durham Regatta.

In 1872 on 12 July Fawcus lost in the Wingfield Sculls to C.C. Knollys who won the Diamonds and OUBC sculls. At the Durham Regatta in 1872, Tynemouth RC won the Grand Challenge Cup once again.

In 1873 Fawcus challenged for the Wingfield Sculls again but was defeated in the challengers' heat by WH 'Piggy' Eyre of Thames Rowing Club.

In 1874 Fawcus was defeated in the Diamond Sculls at Henley Royal Regatta by A. C. Dicker of Lady Margaret BC (who also won the Wingfields that year).

The only known painting of William Fawcus had been hanging in the Gibraltar Rock public house in Tynemouth before being relocated to the clubhouse at Priors Haven, Tynemouth. Unfortunately it was removed by a Rowing Master of the 6th Form College for restoration and despite efforts to relocate it, was last heard of in Scarborough. It was reported that the damage was so great that the painting disintegrated
