= James Redhouse =

British lexicographer (1811-1892)

Redhouse's Turkish Dictionary, Second Edition (1880)

Sir James William Redhouse KCMG (30 December 1811 – 4 January 1892) was a British lexicographer. He authored the original and authoritative Ottoman–English dictionary. He was commissioned by the American Board of Commissioners for Foreign Missions for his dictionary. His work was later used as the basis for many Turkish–English dictionaries.

== Biography ==
Redhouse was born near London, the eldest son of James Redhouse and his wife Elizabeth Saunders. He was orphaned and educated at Christ's Hospital from 1819 to 1826. In 1826 he toured the Mediterranean, Smyrna (now İzmir) and Constantinople (the entirety of which is now Istanbul). He was offered a post by the Turkish government as a draftsman, and as a result learnt Turkish. In 1830 he visited Russia and returned to England in 1834 to publish a Turkish-English dictionary.

In 1838 Redhouse returned to work for the Ottoman government as an interpreter to the Grand Vizier and the Minister for Foreign Affairs. He transferred to the Ottoman Admiralty in 1840, became a member of the Naval Council, and went to Syria to help communications between the English, Austrian, and Ottoman fleets which were running a blockade. He received the Sultan's Imperial Order (İftihar Nişanı) in 1841. In 1843 he was appointed secretary and interpreter to the British Commissioner William Fenwick Williams, who was arranging a peace treaty between the Ottoman Empire and Persia. Redhouse was also involved in peace negotiations at Erzurum in 1847 and was awarded the Persian Order of the Lion and the Sun. He returned to Constantinople until 1853. He was appointed oriental translator to the Foreign Office in 1854 and went to Paris to help negotiate a treaty with Persia.

Redhouse retired from the Foreign Office to concentrate on literary work. He joined the Royal Asiatic Society in 1854 and was its secretary from 1861 to 1864. He lived at Kilburn where he compiled a dictionary of Arabic, Persian and Turkish languages. In 1884 he was given an honorary doctorate at Cambridge University. He was made CMG in 1885 and knighted in 1888.

Redhouse married firstly Jane Carruthers Slade, daughter of Thomas Slade of Liverpool, who died in 1887. He was married again in 1888 to Eliza Colquhoun, daughter of Sir Patrick Colquhoun.

== Works ==
- Müntahabât-ı Lügât-i Osmâniyye (1838)
- Grammaire raisonnée de la langue ottomane (1846)
- Kitāb-i müntah̲ābat-i luġāt-i Os̲māniye. [A Dictionary of Arabic and Persian words used in Turkish] (as compiler) (1853)
- The Turkish campaigner's vade-mecum of Ottoman colloquial language (1855)
- The Turkish vade mecum [&c.] (1877)
- A Vindication of the Ottoman Sultans title of Caliph (1877)
- On the History, System and Varieties of Turkish Poetry (1879)
- A Simplified Grammar of the Ottoman-Turkish (1884)
- The Mesnevi (1881)
- A Turkish and English Lexicon: Shewing in English the Significations of the Turkish Terms (1890)
- Kitabı maanii lehçe li James Redhouse el İngilizi (1890)
