= Thomas Bumpsted =

English surgeon and rower

Thomas Brooks Bumpsted (1822–1917) was an English surgeon and rower who won both the Diamond Challenge Sculls and Wingfield Sculls in 1844. He later died at the age of 94 in the Chesterton district.

Bumpsted was born at Berkley, Somerset. He studied medicine at St George's Hospital, London and became MRCS in 1844. In 1843 he stroked the St George's Club crew that won the Stewards' Challenge Cup at Henley Royal Regatta. In the same year he competed unsuccessfully in the Wingfield Sculls. In 1844, rowing for Scullers Club, he won the first Diamond Challenge Sculls at Henley, beating H Morgan of Christ Church, Oxford and J W Conant of St John's College, Oxford. His time was 10 minutes 32 seconds Later that year he won the Wingfield Sculls beating the holder H Chapman. In 1845 he was beaten in the Wingfield Sculls by Chapman.

Bumpsted was in medical practice in Cambridge and was surgeon at Cambridge County Gaol.

Bumpsted married Margaret Louisa Yaustin Doria of Flempton in 1856.
