= Lancaster University Boat Club =

British rowing club

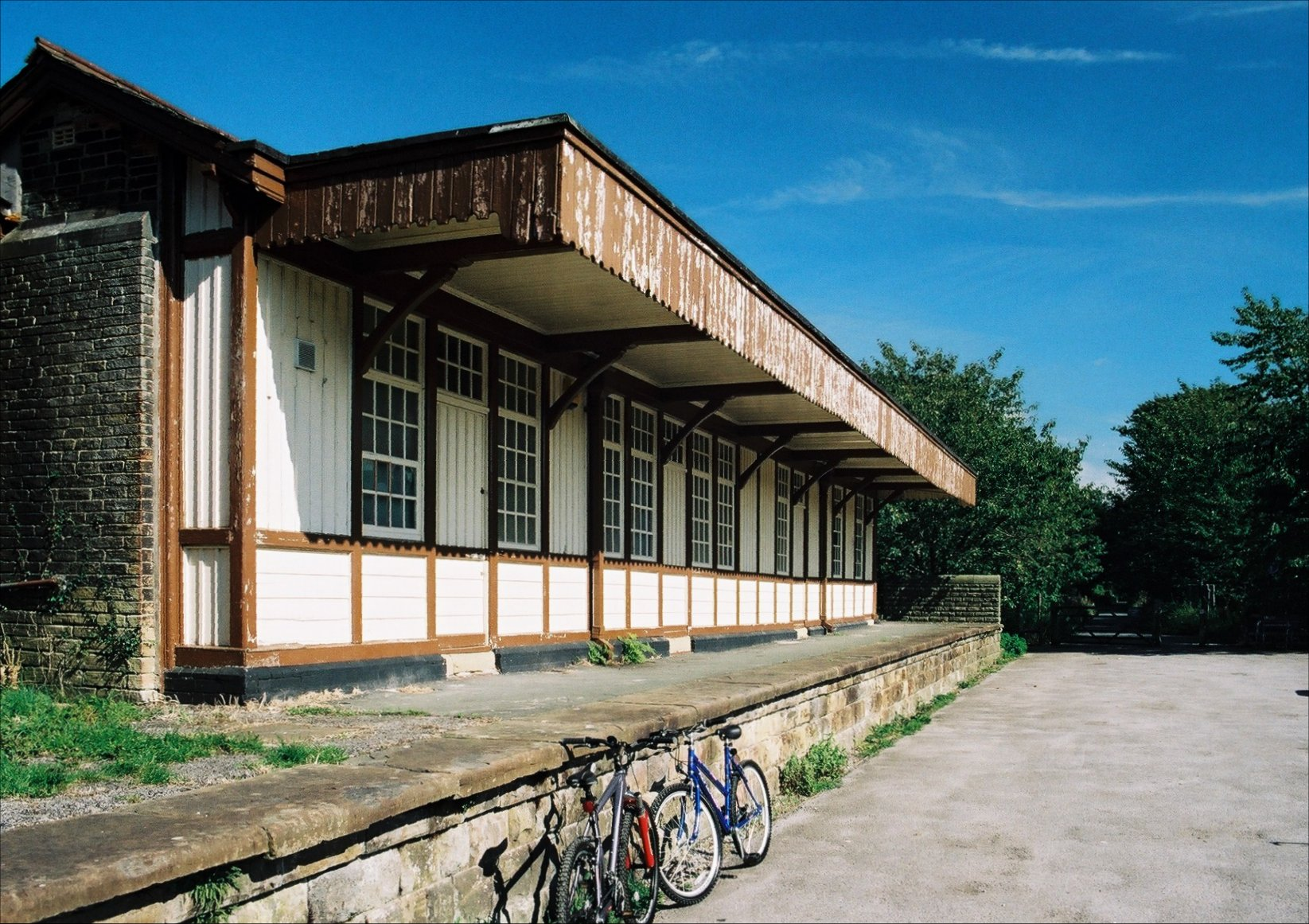

- Location: Halton, Lancashire
- Coordinates: 54.074°N 2.759°W
- Home water: River Lune
- Founded: 1964
- Membership: 150
- University: Lancaster University
- Affiliations: British Rowing
- Website: lancasterunibc.co.uk

Events
- Roses Tournament

Lancaster University Boat Club (LUBC) is the rowing club of Lancaster University. The club was founded in 1964 with the inception of the university by Sir Harold Parkinson and is the oldest sports club at the university. The club is based in the old Halton railway station and trains on a 3 km stretch of the River Lune, 3 miles north of Lancaster.

== History ==
The university opened to students in October 1964. A group of students from the university began the task of assembling the necessary equipment for the foundation of a University Boat Club which could stand independent of the local club, Lancaster John O'Gaunt Rowing Club.

Due to the limited available assistance of the university and the students' union, the group decided to seek outside help to get the club moving. This help came in the form of a wealthy benefactor, Sir Harold Parkinson, who provided the club with the funds to purchase its first boats and a coaching launch. John O'Gaunt Rowing Club offered their facilities as a temporary home for the newly formed University Boat Club and from 1964 to 1966 both clubs cohabited.

After two years of sharing John O’Gaunt's boathouse, the club moved to its current location, the old Halton railway station in 1966. This acquisition was entirely down to Parkinson again; after the station had been closed to the public in 1966, he rented the building on behalf of the club. It was converted into suitable quarters to operate from. The location of the new boat house was ideal; less than 100 m from the River Lune and placed on the railway which would soon be converted into the Lancaster – Caton Cycleway, which is used by members for commuting to the boat house. Parkinson also funded the building of the Halton weir, 100m upstream of club's boathouse, in order to enable better conditions for rowing.

In 1982 the free-hold of the boathouse and the surrounding land was secured to be administered by the university as a part of the university's estates. From 1996, the club allowed Lancaster University Canoe Club to use the premises to store their boats.

The Francis Russell Trophy is raced for each year between Lancaster John O'Gaunt RC and Lancaster University BC. The race is in memory of ex-club captain Francis Russel who lost his life in 1989 after going over the Skerton Weir in a November training session. The trophy takes the form of a mounted rudder, that of the boat that went over the weir.

In December 2015 the effects of Storm Desmond caused the River Lune to flood much of the City of Lancaster and surrounding area, with the University's Boat House being flooded by several feet of water causing damage to much of the fleet of boats, and resulting in a severe disruption to the clubs rowing calendar.

The COVID-19 pandemic disrupted much of the 2019/20 and 2020/21 seasons for the club. The third-term (April-July) of the 2019/20 season and second-term (January-March) of the 2020/2021 season saw the club unable to row due to restrictions in place from the UK Government and British Rowing. When restrictions were eased the club returned to the water, but with the indoor changing rooms in the boat house closed to ensure social distancing guidelines were adhered to. Due to funding cuts at the students union, the club received much less funding in the 2020/21 season, reducing their ability to perform maintenance and buy new equipment. Due to restrictions in place, many races and events that the club would normally attend were cancelled. The Roses varsity against the University of York Boat Club in April 2021 was the first ever to be competed for virtually. The clubs each fielded teams of novice men, novice women, senior men and senior women to compete in 4x500m relay races which were livestreamed.

== Location ==
=== Boat house ===
The Lancaster University Boat House takes the form of the disused Halton Railway Station on Denny Beck Lane, 3 miles North of Lancaster. The upper floor of the station building houses the club kitchen, changing rooms and toilet facilities, whilst the lower floor houses the club's fleet of boats as well as Lancaster University Canoe Club's canoes. Fixed racking exists for up to ten rigged larger boats (eights or fours). A mobile rack was added in 2020 to house 5 small boats, with space on the rack available to rent for members of the club and the public. Evidence of the building's past life still exists in the racking area in the form of a 5-ton crane. Plans existed in the late 20th century for a shared boathouse with the other clubs using the river, John O'Gaunt RC and Lancaster Royal Grammar School BC.

=== River ===
The club trains along a 3 km stretch of the River Lune, from the Denny Beck Bridge to the Skerton Weir adjacent John O'Gaunt RC, which marks the upper extent of the tidal Lune. The river is shared with John O'Gaunt RC (JOG) and Lancaster Royal Grammar School RC (LRGSRC), boating from Skerton and the Halton Army Training camp respectively. The river passes below the Grade I listed 18th-century Lune Aqueduct. Notable races on this stretch of the Lune include the Head of the Lune, the City of Lancaster Regatta, the Red Rose head races and the Roses Varsity race against the University of York Boat Club.

=== Sports Center ===
The Lancaster University Sports Center is used by the club for most land-based training. Weight training is performed in the Strength and Conditioning facility, opened in 2018. Ergometer workouts are performed on the club's fleet of Concept2 Ergometers outside the sports center complex. Circuit training sessions are held in the Sports Hall.

== Races ==
The club frequently aims to attend the following races:

=== Head races ===
- Head of the Lune
- Rutherford Head
- Dee Autumn Head
- York Small Boats Head
- BUCS Head
- Women's Head of the River
- North of England Head
- Head of the River Race

=== Regattas ===
- BUCS Regatta
- Durham Regatta
- Henley Women's Regatta
- Henley Royal Regatta
- Hexham Regatta
- Marlow Regatta
- Metropolitan Regatta

=== Roses Varsity Race ===
The club was one of the founders of the Roses Varsity race with The University of York Boat Club. This originated in 1965 when the Vice-Chancellor of York suggested a boat race between the two institutions, which later developed into the Roses Competition that sees scores of York and Lancaster athletes compete across a wide range of sports, alternating the venue between the universities annually.

== Equipment ==
The focuses on sweep rowing in larger boats. As such, the fleet consists of 6 eights, 5 coxed fours, 1 coxless four and 5 coxless pairs. On occasion, some fours and pairs may be rigged for sculling. There is room available to rent for up to 5 small boats on the club's mobile rack. The club has two coaching launches, used during training sessions.

The club owns a large fleet of Model E & D, PM5 Concept2 Ergometers, mostly purchased in 2020.

== See also ==
- British Rowing
- Lancaster University
- Lancaster John O'Gaunt Rowing Club
