= City of London Artillery =

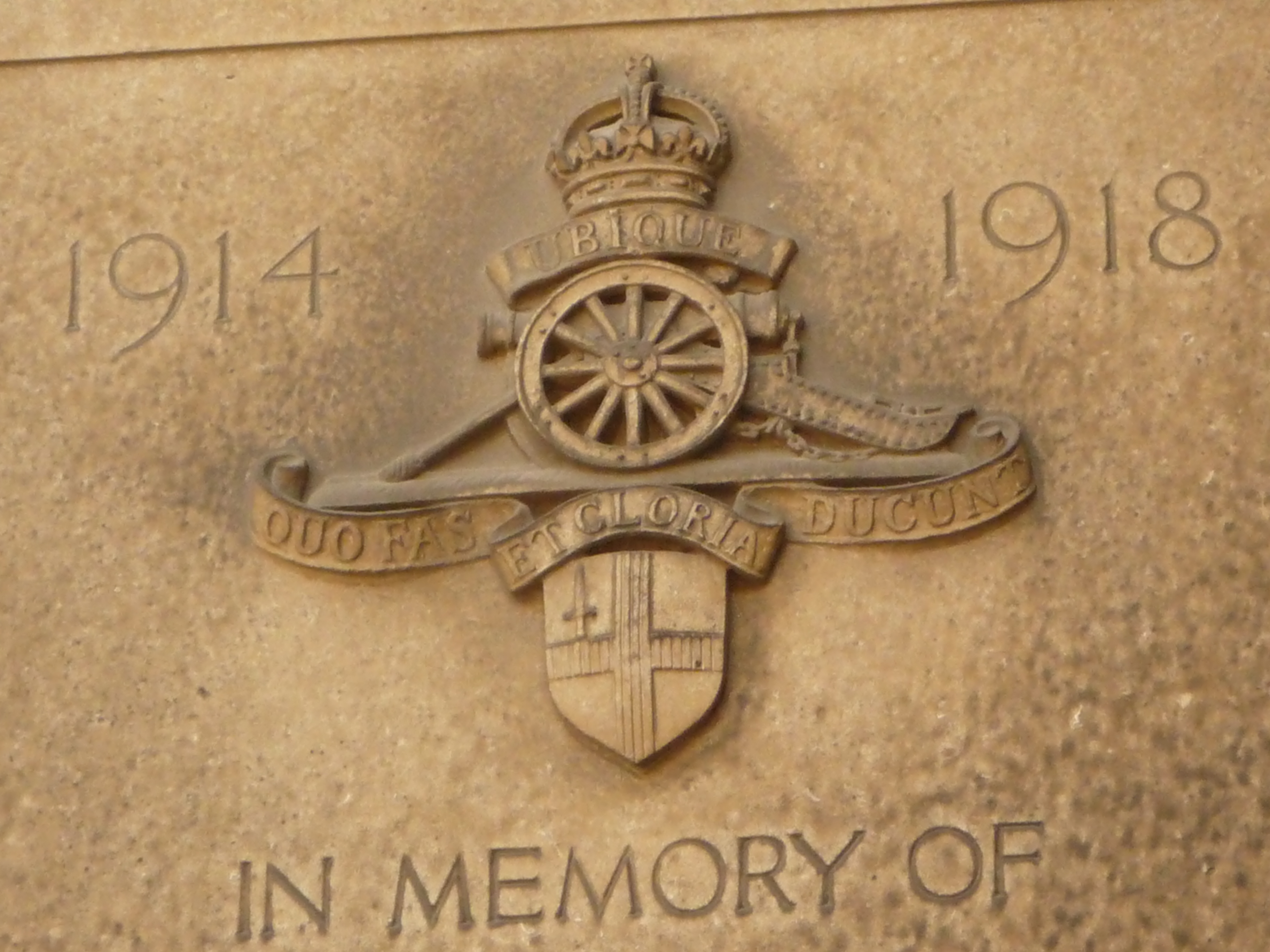
- Badge of the City of London Artillery
- Active: 15 April 1863 – 1 April 1971
- Country: United Kingdom
- Branch: Territorial Army
- Type: Artillery Regiment
- Role: Field artillery
- Engagements: Western Front (World War I); North Africa; Sicily; Italy; North West Europe

Commanders
- Notable commanders: Lt-Col John Walmisley; Lt-Col William Hope, VC; Lt-Col George Dorrell, VC

The 1st London Artillery Brigade or City of London Artillery was a volunteer field artillery unit of the British Army, part of the Territorial Force and later the Territorial Army, that existed under various titles from 1863 to 1971 and fought in World War I and World War II.

== Origins ==
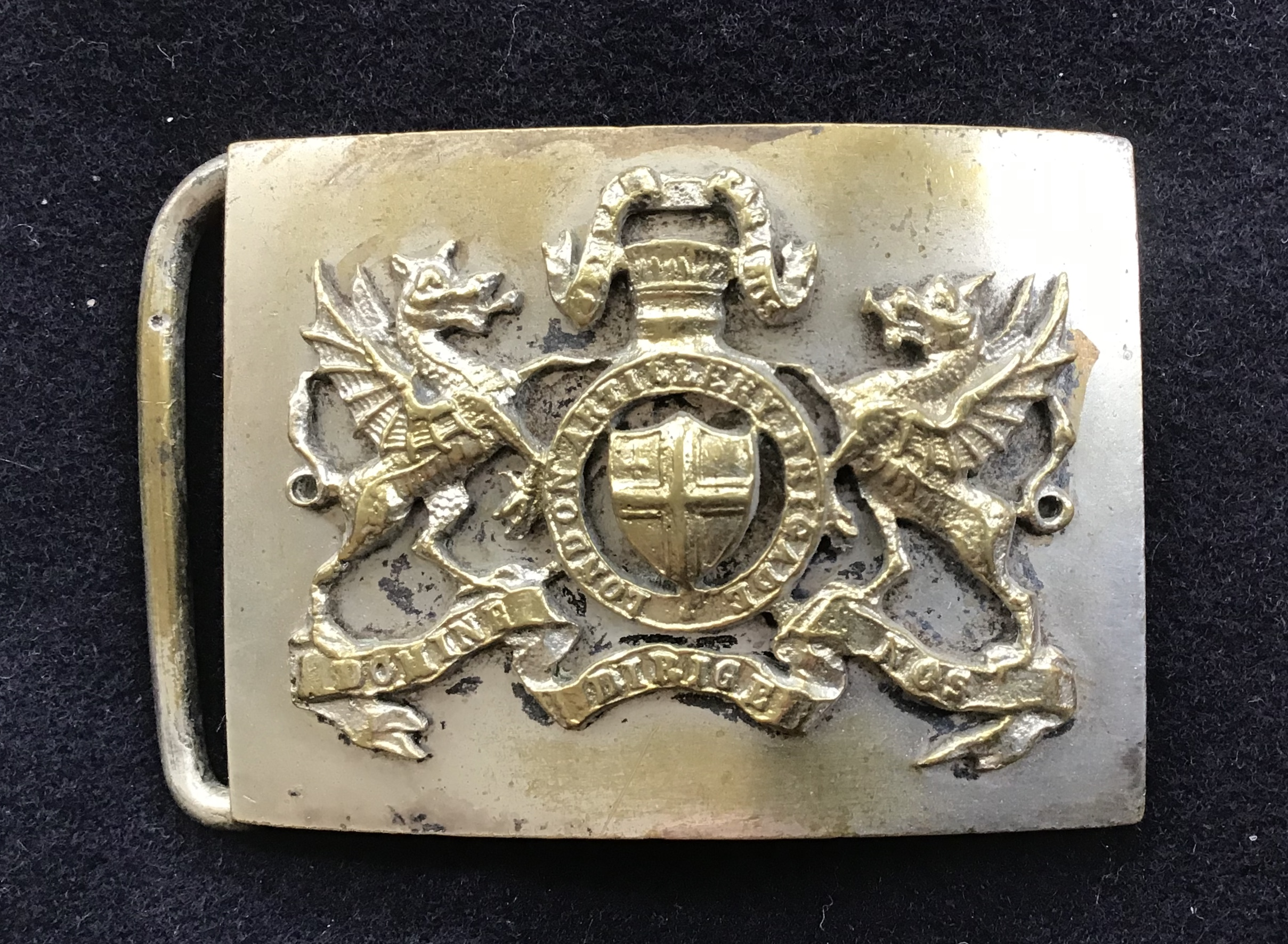
Officer's waistbelt clasp, City of London Artillery, c1880

The enthusiasm of the Volunteer movement in 1859 and subsequent years saw the creation of many Rifle, Artillery and Engineer Volunteer units composed of part-time soldiers eager to supplement the Regular British Army in time of need. The 1st London (City) Artillery Volunteer Corps (AVC) was raised in the City of London on 15 April 1863, with its HQ and five (later six) batteries at 5 Farringdon Road. The titles '1st London' and 'City of London' were used interchangeably throughout the unit's history. As one of the later AVCs raised, the 1st Londons ranked 61st (later 65th) in order of precedence. The first commanding officer was Captain (later Lieutenant-Colonel) John Walmisley (1818–90), a London solicitor, famous oarsman and former officer in the Honourable Artillery Company. The unit's first Honorary Colonel was Prince Alfred, Duke of Edinburgh.

In 1873, the 1st London AVC became part of the 1st Administrative Brigade of Middlesex Artillery Volunteers under the command of Walmisley. Artillery Volunteer units proved expensive to maintain, and the Secretary of State for War, Edward Cardwell, refused to pay for the upkeep of horses, harness and field-guns from the annual capitation grant. As a result, many Volunteer Field artillery units were wound up in the 1870s and the two batteries of the 1st (Hanover Square) Middlesex AVC were absorbed into the 1st London. In 1883, the 1st London also absorbed the 1st Surrey AVC, and by now it had 16 batteries around the City and County of London (Nos 1–3 and 8 at Camberwell; Nos 4, 9, 11 and 13–16 at the HQ at the Barbican; No 5 at Peckham; No 6 at Norwood; No 7 at Tooting; No 10 at Kilburn; No 12 at Shepherd's Bush). At first the brigade had consisted of Horse and Field artillery batteries, but now the 16 batteries became Garrison Artillery companies, divided into two wings, each commanded by a lieutenant-colonel. This made it one of the strongest brigades in the country, at one time boasting a strength of over 1,500 volunteers.

Walmisley retired in January 1875 and was succeeded by William Hope, who had won a Victoria Cross in the Crimean war and had afterwards become a City businessman.

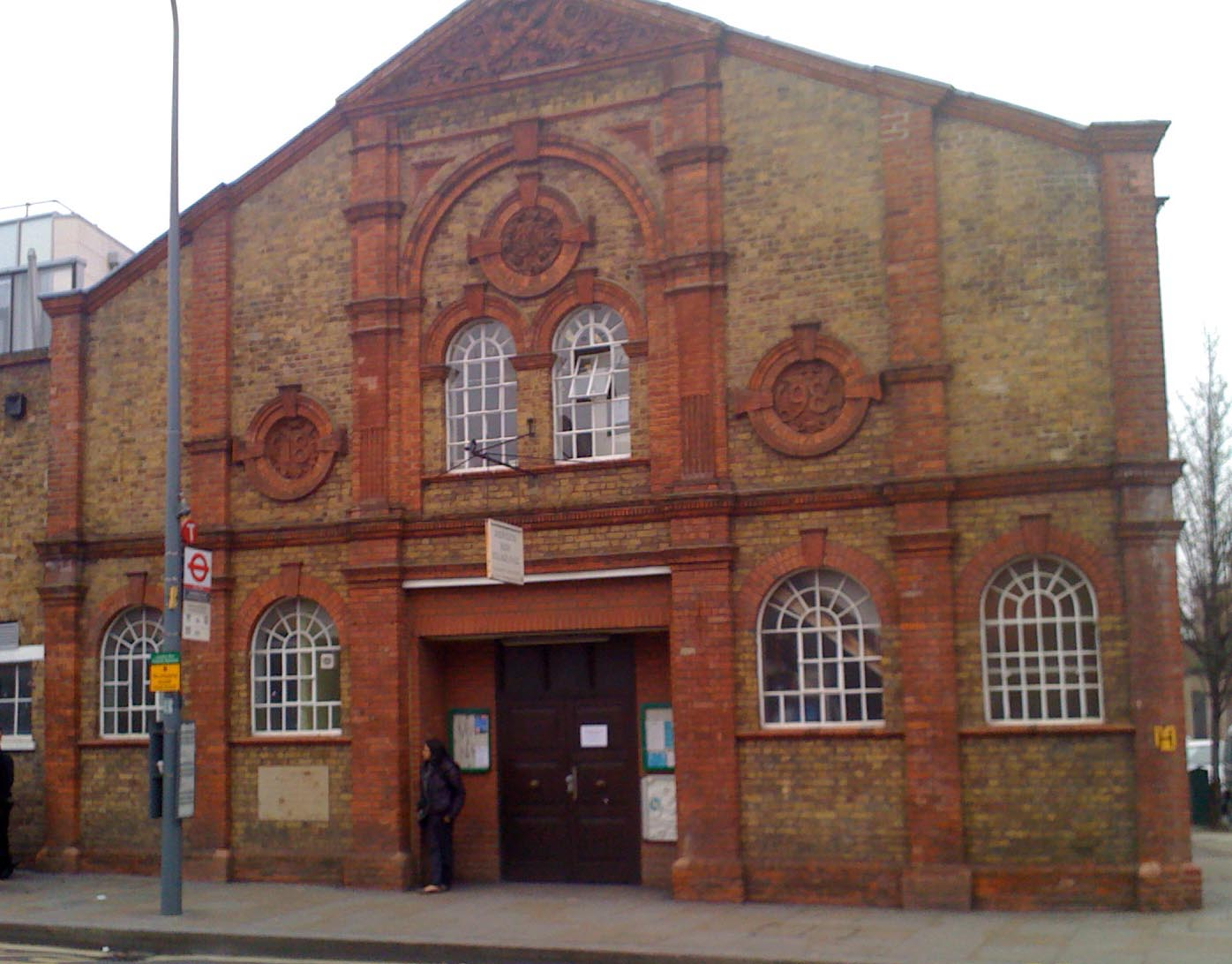
Drill Hall built in 1898 for some of the batteries of the 1st London Artillery Volunteers, Shepherd's Bush, London. Later used by the 7th London Brigade, Royal Field Artillery (TF)

In 1887 and 1890, the Corps won the Queen's Prize at the annual National Artillery Association competition held at Shoeburyness. By 1893, the War Office Mobilisation Scheme had allocated the unit to the Thames defences. During the Second Boer War, the brigade supplied volunteers to the City of London Imperial Volunteers and other branches of the Regular forces.

The 1st Londons had been included in the London Division when the Royal Artillery (RA) adopted a territorial structure on 1 April 1882, but this was disbanded and the unit was assigned to the Eastern Division on 1 July 1889. All artillery volunteers were assigned to the Royal Garrison Artillery (RGA) in 1899. When the divisional organisation was abandoned on 1 January 1902, the unit was re-titled 1st City of London Royal Garrison Artillery (Volunteers). At this time, the 16 companies were based at Staines House, Barbican (HQ and Nos 1-7), Shepherd's Bush (Nos 8–10) and Brixton (Nos 11–16).

== Territorial Force ==
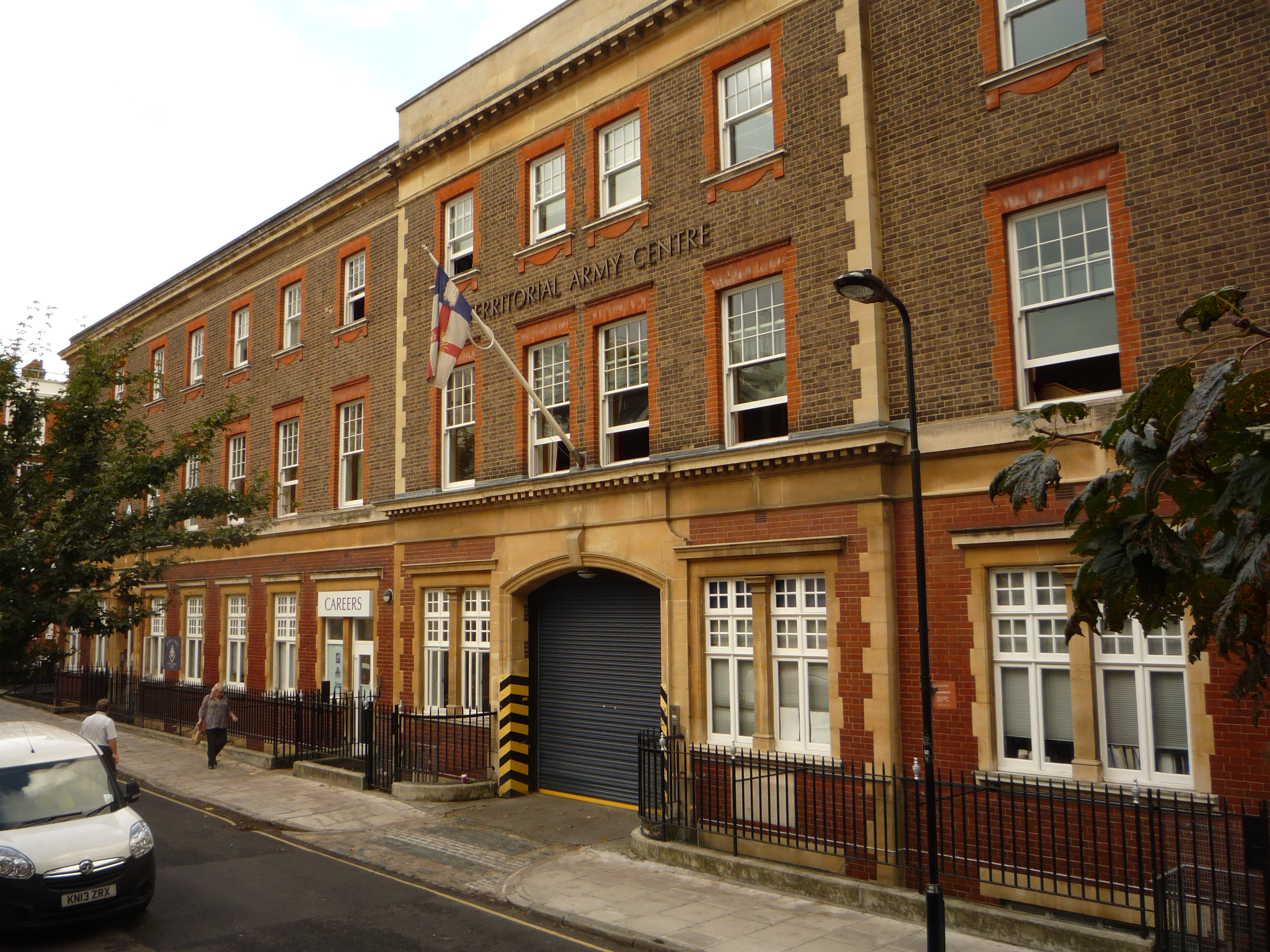
Artillery House, Handel St, London. Opened in 1913 as headquarters of the 1st City of London Brigade, RFA, and shared with the 1st (City of London) Battalion, London Regiment. After World War II it was shared with the City of London Yeomanry. Today (2013) it is known as Yeomanry House and is HQ of the University of London Officers' Training Corps.

In 1908, the Haldane Reforms created the Territorial Force (TF), which subsumed the previous Volunteers. The large 1st London corps provided three field brigades of the Royal Field Artillery in the new force: the companies at Shepherd's Bush became the VII London Brigade while those at Brixton became the VI London Brigade. The remaining companies based at the Barbican became the I City of London Brigade RFA (TF):

- Brigade HQ – from HQ and part of No 7 Company
- 1st City of London Battery – from Nos 1 and 4 Companies
- 2nd City of London Battery – from Nos 2 and 6 Companies
- 3rd City of London Battery – from Nos 3 and 5 Companies
- 1st London Ammunition Column – from No 7 Company

I City of London Bde, along with II, II and IV London Bdes, was assigned to the 1st London Division of the TF. The three batteries were each equipped with four 15-pounder guns. In 1913, the brigade moved to a new headquarters at Artillery House, Handel Street, in Bloomsbury. The building was shared with the 1st (City of London) Battalion, London Regiment (Royal Fusiliers).

== World War I ==
=== Mobilisation and organisation ===
Annual training for 1st London Division had just started when war was declared on 4 August 1914, and the City of London Brigade promptly mustered at Bloomsbury for mobilisation. The Division's infantry were soon posted away to relieve Regular Army garrisons in the Mediterranean or to supplement the British Expeditionary Force on the Western Front. By January 1915, only the artillery and other support elements of the division remained in England, and these were attached to the Second Line TF division (58th (2/1st London) Division) that was being formed. The City of London Brigade became 1/I City of London Bde and formed 2/I City of London Bde, which served with the 58th Division throughout the war.

Colonel J. Stollery, who commanded I City of London Brigade, had been with the unit since 1874 and was too old for overseas service, so he remained behind to train the 2/I Brigade. So many recruits came forward, including many who had previously served with the brigade and whose training could be quickly refreshed, that the 2/I Brigade was soon completed, and a 3rd Line Brigade was also formed to supply reinforcements to the other two.

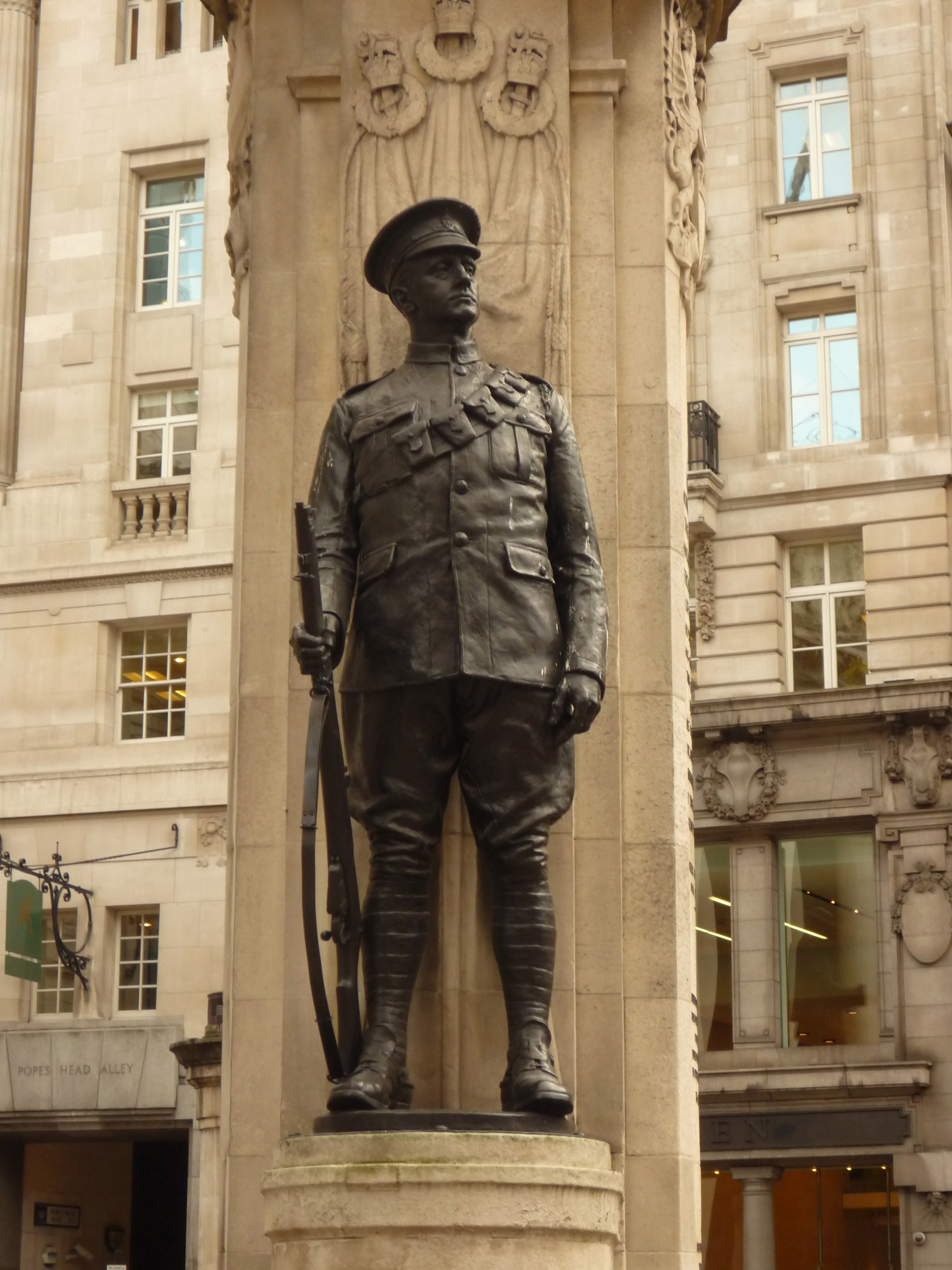
The artilleryman depicted on the London Troops Memorial.

=== 1/I City of London Brigade ===
The brigade left Handel Street on 23 August 1914 and underwent training in various locations. During the winter of 1914–15, it spent five months guarding the Northumbrian Coast. In August 1915, the 36th (Ulster) Division was being readied for service. Its infantry were largely drawn from the Ulster Volunteers and had already received weapons training before the war; the artillery however were newly raised Londoners, and the drivers were still being taught to mount and dismount from wooden horses. The 1st London Divisional Artillery were therefore attached to the Ulster Division until its own gunners were ready for active service. In September 1915, the 1/I City of London Bde moved to Bordon to re-equip with modern guns and prepare for overseas service. It then accompanied the Ulster division to France, landing at Le Havre on 4 October 1915. 1/I Bde went into the line on 9 October, and first went into action at Colincamps.

In December, the Ulster Division's artillery arrived from England, and the London Divisional Artillery was transferred to the 38th (Welsh) Division, which had also arrived in France minus its own artillery. 1/I City of London Bde served with the Welsh Division from 11 December 1915 to 1 February 1916. It was next attached to 16th (Irish) Division until 25 February 1916, when the 16th Divisional Artillery arrived. By now, 1st London Division (now numbered 56th (London) Division) was being reformed in France and its divisional artillery was finally able to rejoin.

==== 1916 ====
In April 1916, a Regular battery (93 Battery, from XVIII Brigade Royal Field Artillery, which had been serving with Indian and Canadian formations) joined 1/I City of London Bde. In May, TF artillery brigades were numbered in sequence with the Royal Field Artillery: 1/I City of London became CCLXXX Brigade (280 Brigade), and the batteries became A–D. Shortly afterwards, D (93rd) Battery was exchanged with a battery (formerly 11th County of London Battery) from the divisional howitzer brigade, equipped with 4.5-inch howitzers. Brigade Ammunition Columns were also abolished at this time, and the men distributed between the batteries and the Divisional Ammunition Column. By mid-May, the division had formed its three medium trench mortar batteries: 1/I City of London Bde provided the manpower for X Battery. In the winter of 1916–17, TF field artillery batteries were reorganised from a four-gun to a six-gun establishment, so B Battery was split between A and C Batteries, and to make up the numbers 93rd Battery rejoined together with a section from 500 Battery (a New Army howitzer unit). For the remainder of the war, therefore, 1/I City of London had the following organisation:

CCLXXX Brigade RFA

- 93rd Battery
- A Battery
- C Battery
- D (Howitzer) Battery

==== Gommecourt ====
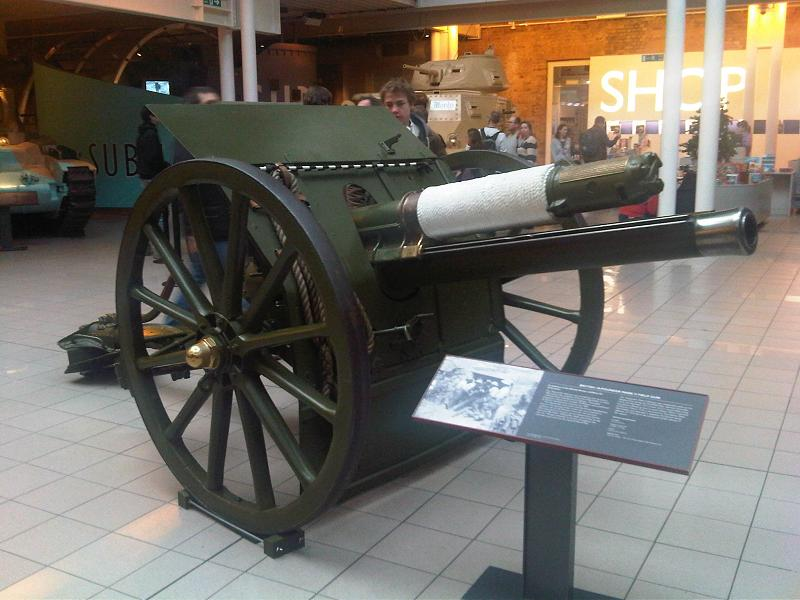
18-pounder Mk II field gun preserved at the Imperial War Museum.

The first major action for CCLXXX (280) Bde came at the Battle of the Somme, and there are detailed accounts of its actions. 56th Division's task for the opening day of the Somme Offensive (the 'Big Push') was to attack the south side of the Gommecourt Salient as a diversion to support the main attack further south.

The divisional artillery was disposed in three groups. Lt-Col L.A.C Southam of 280 Bde commanded the Northern Group (called 'Southart') with B/280 and C/280 Btys (together with D (H)/282 and A/283 Btys), while A/280 and D (H)/280 Btys were in the Wire Cutting Group under Lt-Col A.F Prechtel of 282 Bde ('Peltart'), though A/280 Bty reverted to 'Southart' at Zero Hour. During the preliminary bombardment, Southart was under VII Corps control, but from Zero Hour it was assigned to support the assaulting infantry of 169th (3rd London) Brigade. The batteries began moving into position in late May 1916, A/280 and B/280 being the last to arrive on 3 June. The batteries then began to register their targets during June.

B/280 and C/280 Batteries were positioned west of Gommecourt to take the German lines in enfilade at ranges of 2,000 and 3,000 yards respectively. Their role was to 'search' the enemy trenches, villages, woods and hollows. In the wire cutting group, A/280 Bty was in a fold of ground about 1,500 yards west of the British-held village of Hébuterne and about 2,500 yards from the German lines, while the howitzers of D (H)/280 Bty were dug into the gardens and orchards behind Hébuterne, where they could range into the German rear areas. One section (two howitzers) was on call to assist the heavy counter-battery guns in addition to their wire-cutting task.

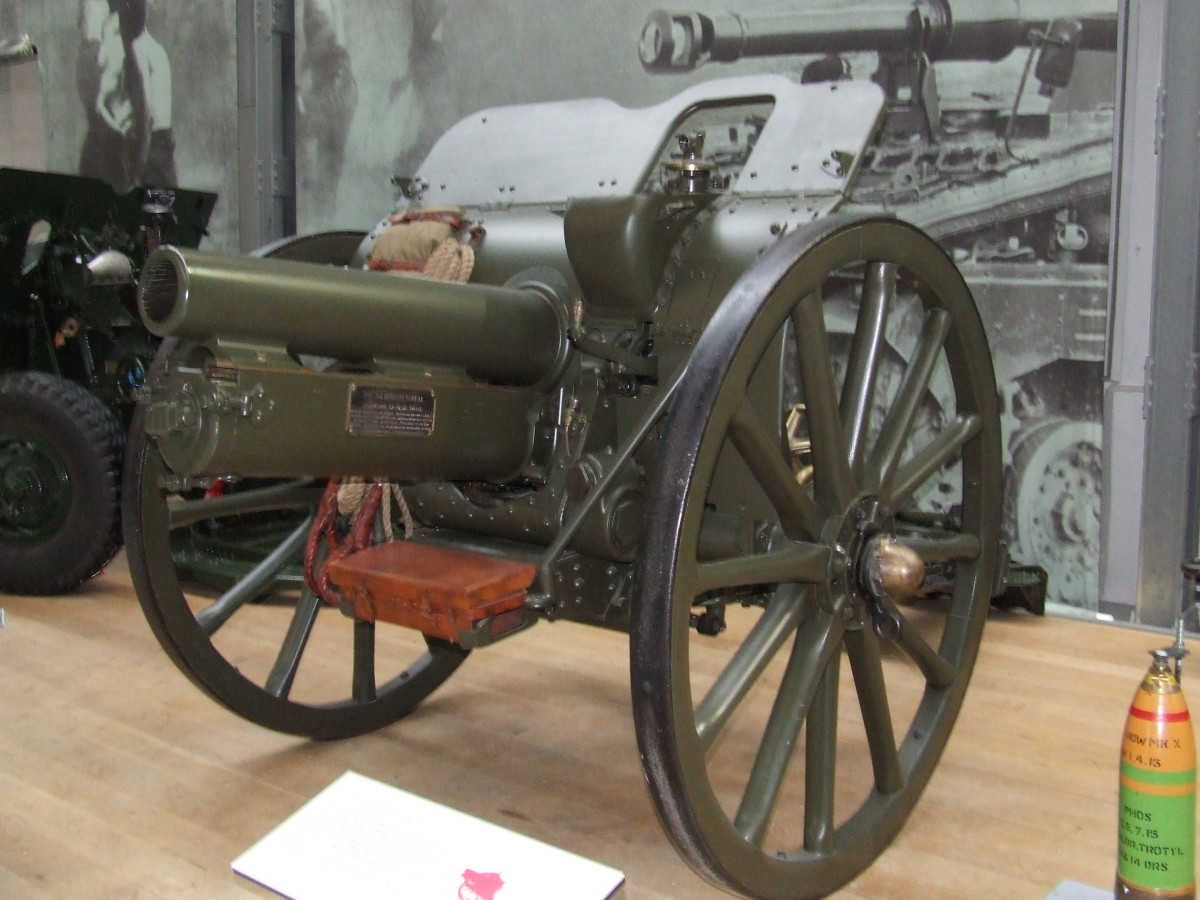
4.5-inch Howitzer preserved at the Royal Artillery Museum

Five days of intense bombardment were planned leading up to the attack, designated U, V, W, X and Y days, but the whole attack was delayed by two days, so there was seven days of bombardment culminating in Z Day on 1 July. The two additional days were used for Interdiction of enemy movement and repairs, to complete the wire-cutting and counter-battery tasks, and to deceive the enemy. The Southart Group found that by Y Day (28 June) the guns were showing signs of strain, with recoil springs having to be frequently replaced, and the extension to Y2 Day (30 June) made the situation worse. The division's batteries and observation posts (OPs) also suffered from German counter-battery fire.

Each afternoon, the bombardment paused between 16.00 and 16.30 to allow a BE2c aircraft of No. 8 Squadron, Royal Flying Corps, to photograph the German positions. Analysis of these pictures on 30 June revealed large areas of uncut wire, especially in the centre of the area to be attacked by 56th Division. Night patrols confirmed these reports.

Each day of the firing programme had included an intense bombardment starting at 06.25, reaching a crescendo at 07.20 and lifting at 07.45; on Z Day (1 July), this lifted 15 minutes earlier than usual, in an attempt to deceive the enemy. 56th Divisional artillery was allocated 11,600 rounds for this final 65 minutes, amounting to three rounds per minute for each 18-pounder gun and 4.5-inch howitzer. A smoke screen was laid at 07.25, and under its cover the infantry went 'over the top' and assembled in No man's land. Then, at Zero Hour, 07.30, the guns lifted to pre-arranged targets in the German support and reserve lines while the infantry began their assault.

Having reverted to divisional control at Zero Hour, the 18-pounders had a series of very short lifts, almost amounting to a creeping barrage. The first lift was onto the German reserve trench, on which they fired for four minutes, then they fired for six minutes just beyond it, and then swept the communication trenches for 12 minutes. Next, they shifted to the infantry's second objective for eight minutes. This programme was intended to conform to the infantry's plan of attack.

At first, this went well for 56th Division. Despite casualties from the German counter-bombardment on their jumping-off trenches, the smoke and morning mist helped the infantry, and they reached the German front line with little loss and moved on towards the second and reserve lines. The artillery OPs reported the signboards erected by the leading waves to mark their progress. On 169 Bde's front, the London Rifle Brigade found the wire well cut, except at Point 94 where the shelling had piled it into mounds that still presented an obstacle, and the battalion reached Gommecourt Park and began to consolidate. But the Queen Victoria's Rifles struggled to get through narrow gaps in uncut wire and met fierce resistance at the Cemetery, so that the following battalion, the Queen's Westminsters, got mixed up with them while trying to push through to the second objective, the Quadrilateral. The Germans began counter-attacking about an hour after Zero, and their heavy barrage on No man's land and their own front trenches made it almost impossible for reinforcements and supplies to be got forward to the assaulting battalions, who were now cut off. On the other side of the Gommecourt Salient, the assault of the 46th (North Midland) Division was a disaster, bogged down in mud and uncut wire, and the defenders could turn all their attention to the 56th Division.

Although VII Corps' heavy guns and 56th Division's howitzers tried to suppress the German artillery, and the Southart guns dealt with some counter-attacks coming down communication trenches, the situation was too confused for the OPs and spotter aircraft to allow the divisional artillery to provide close support for the infantry. Several of the field guns were also out of action with broken springs: at 12.05 Southart reported only 13 out of 20 18-pounders were firing. By 15.45, the group only had three guns from A/280 firing from near Hébuterne and one of C/280 firing at Gommecourt Park, and only four guns from the other three batteries were in action. Even when repaired, the guns had to conserve ammunition later in the day.

At about 13.00, the isolated battalions in the German lines began to crumble, and by 16.00 169 Bde only held the German front line trench. The Southart Group now had 14 serviceable guns and was firing just over the heads of the men. By nightfall, all of the 56th Division's gains had been reduced to a single stretch of trench, and this had to be abandoned after dark.

The attack at Gommecourt had only been a diversion, so it was not continued after the first day., and 56th Division remained in position, holding its original line. On 13 July, the divisional artillery made a demonstration to help the continuing Somme Offensive, and on 17 July all the brigades made raids in the enemy line, but otherwise the period was quiet. On 20 August it was relieved and move south to rejoin the Somme Offensive.

Thereafter CCLXXX Bde supported 56th Division in the following actions:

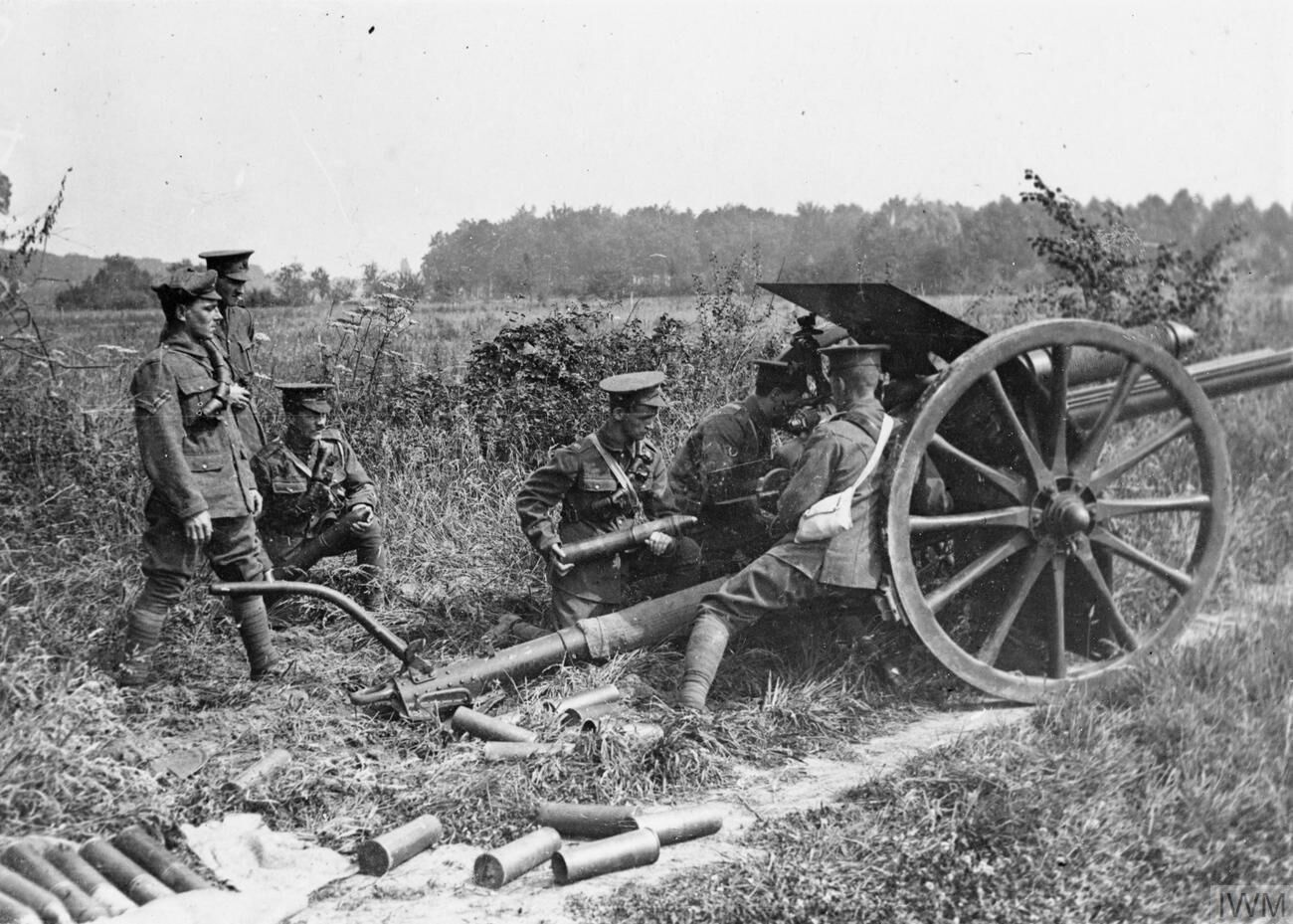
18-pounder in action on the Somme, August 1916.

==== Battle of the Somme ====
- Attack at Gommecourt Salient, 1 July
- Battle of Ginchy, 9 September
- Battle of Flers-Courcelette, 15–22 September
- Battle of Morval, 25–27 September
- Capture of Combles, 26 September
- Battle of the Transloy Ridges, 1–9 October

==== 1917 ====
- German Retreat to the Hindenburg Line, 14 March–5 April
- Battles of Arras
  - First Battle of the Scarpe, 9–14 April
  - Third Battle of the Scarpe, 3–4 May
- Third Battle of Ypres
  - Battle of Langemarck, 16–17 August
- Battle of Cambrai
  - Capture of Tadpole Copse, 21 November
  - Capture of Bourlon Wood, 23–28 November
  - German Counter-attacks, 30 November–2 December

==== 1918 ====
- First Battle of the Somme (1918): The weight of the German spring offensive (Operation Michael) initially fell on British Fifth Army to the south, but on 28 March 1918 the focus of German attacks (Operation Mars) shifted to British Third Army in front of Arras, resulting in what became known as the 1st Battle of Arras (1918). After a heavy bombardment of the British positions, including those held by 56th Division, the attacking German troops swept into the lightly-held outpost line, but there they were shot down by rifle, machine-gun and field gun fire. The artillery were presented with 'many excellent targets'. 280 Brigade was covering the infantry holding Gavrelle on the slope of Vimy Ridge, with a section of 93 Battery well forward in position to fire at the attackers in enfilade. As the defenders of Gavrelle were forced back, Lt G.J. Palfrey, commanding this forward section of two 18-pounders, was ordered to fire off all his ammunition, destroy his guns and withdraw his men. He poured shells into the advancing German infantry until they were close enough to throw grenades and the British defensive barrage was falling on his position. He then destroyed his guns, and he and his crews, taking the breech blocks and sights, and carrying their wounded, fought their way back through the scattered Germans who had already passed the position. Palfrey was awarded the Military Cross for his actions that morning. The German attack was completely stopped, having suffered extraordinarily heavy casualties.
- Second Battle of the Somme (1918)
  - Battle of Albert, 23 August
- Second Battles of Arras
  - Battle of the Scarpe, 26–30 August
- Battles of the Hindenburg Line
  - Battle of the Canal du Nord, 27 September–1 October
  - Second Battle of Cambrai, 8–9 October
  - Pursuit to the Selle, 9–12 October
- Final Advance in Picardy
  - Battle of the Sambre, 4 November
  - Passage of the Grande Honnelle, 5–7 November

Throughout this period, even when the infantry of the division were resting, the divisional artillery were frequently left in the Line supporting other formations. 56th Division was relieved and drawn back into support by midnight on 10 November 1918, but its artillery remained in action until 'Cease Fire' sounded at 11.00 on 11 November when the Armistice with Germany came into force. The cadre of the brigade returned to England on 14 June 1919. The 93rd (Regular) Battery returned to India, where it had been serving when the war broke out.

=== 2/I (City of London) Brigade ===
After the First Line divisional artillery left for France, 2/I City of London Bde joined 58th Division on 25 September at Ipswich with the following composition:

2/I (City of London) Brigade

- 2/1st City of London Battery
- 2/2nd City of London Battery
- 2/3rd City of London Battery
- 2/I City of London Brigade Ammunition Column

The division remained in East Anglia, digging trenches, manning coastal defences. and training, until July 1916, when it moved to Salisbury Plain for final training. By then, the artillery had received their 18-pounders and 4.5-inch howitzers. As with the other TF artillery, the brigade was assigned a number and became CCXC Brigade (290 Brigade). The batteries were redesignated A–C, a howitzer battery was added and became D Battery, and the brigade ammunition columns were abolished. To bring the batteries up to six guns, the 2/I London Bde was reinforced by a battery from 2/III London Bde and a howitzer battery from 2/IV London Bde:

CCXC Brigade RFA

- A Bty (2/1st City of London + half a battery from 2/III London)
- B Bty (2/2nd City of London + half a battery from 2/III London)
- C Bty (2/3rd City of London + half a battery from 2/III London)
- D (H) Bty (2/11th County of London from 2/IV London + half D (H) Bty 2/III London)

==== 1917 ====
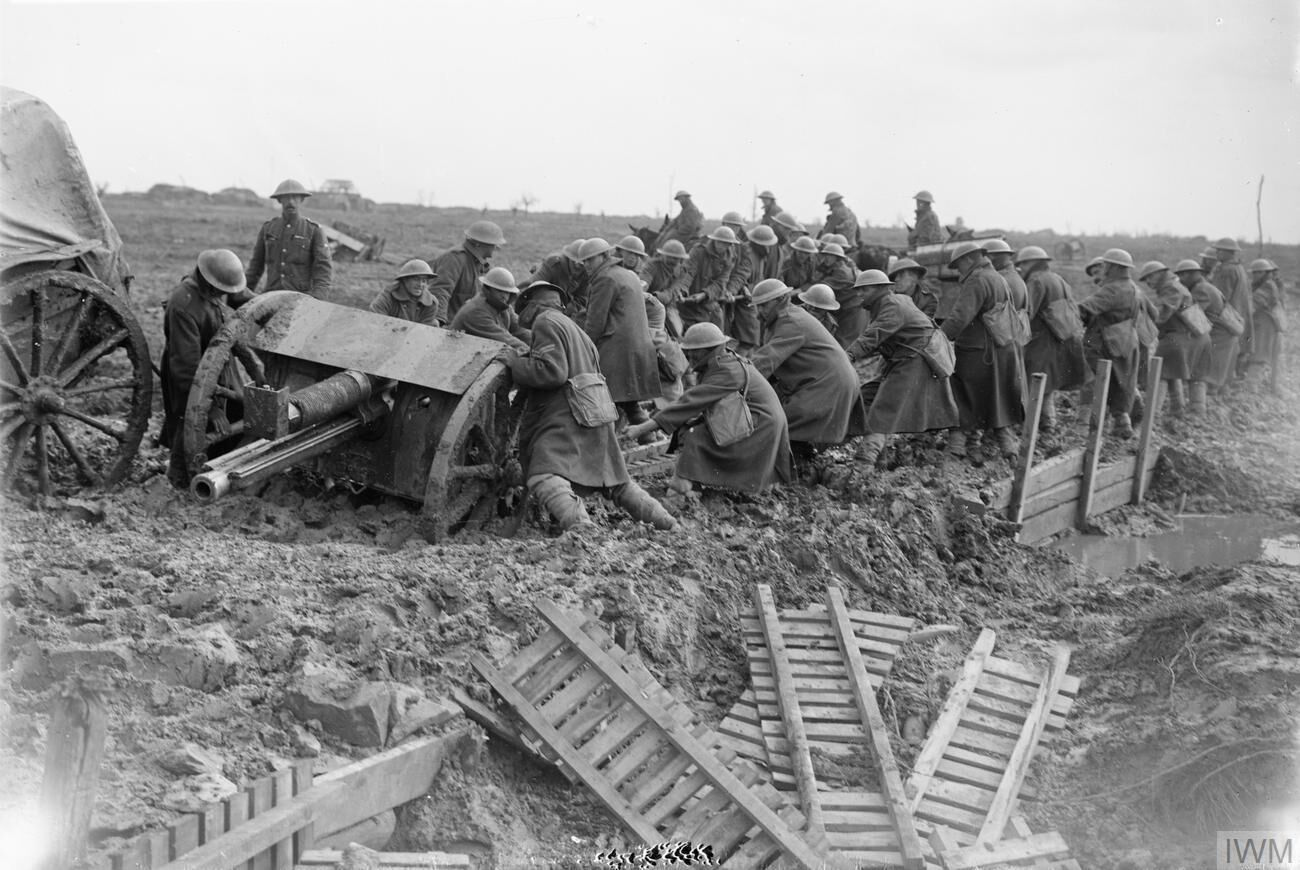
18-pounder being hauled out of mud at Ypres, October 1917.

The division began embarking for France on 20 January 1917. The brigade's first spell in the line was at Berles-au-Bois, in bitter weather that killed many of the horses fetching ammunition. Shortly afterwards, the division followed up when the Germans fell back to the Hindenburg Line (Operation Alberich). Next, the brigade was at Ervillers for the Battle of Bullecourt, then at Havrincourt Wood. It moved to St Julien for the Third Ypres Offensive, where the division took part in the battles of the Menin Road Ridge (20–25 September), Polygon Wood (26–27 September) and then the Second Battle of Passchendaele (26 October–10 November). Casualties were high: in one 14-day period the six-gun D (Howitzer) Bty lost 10 guns destroyed or disabled.

==== 1918 ====
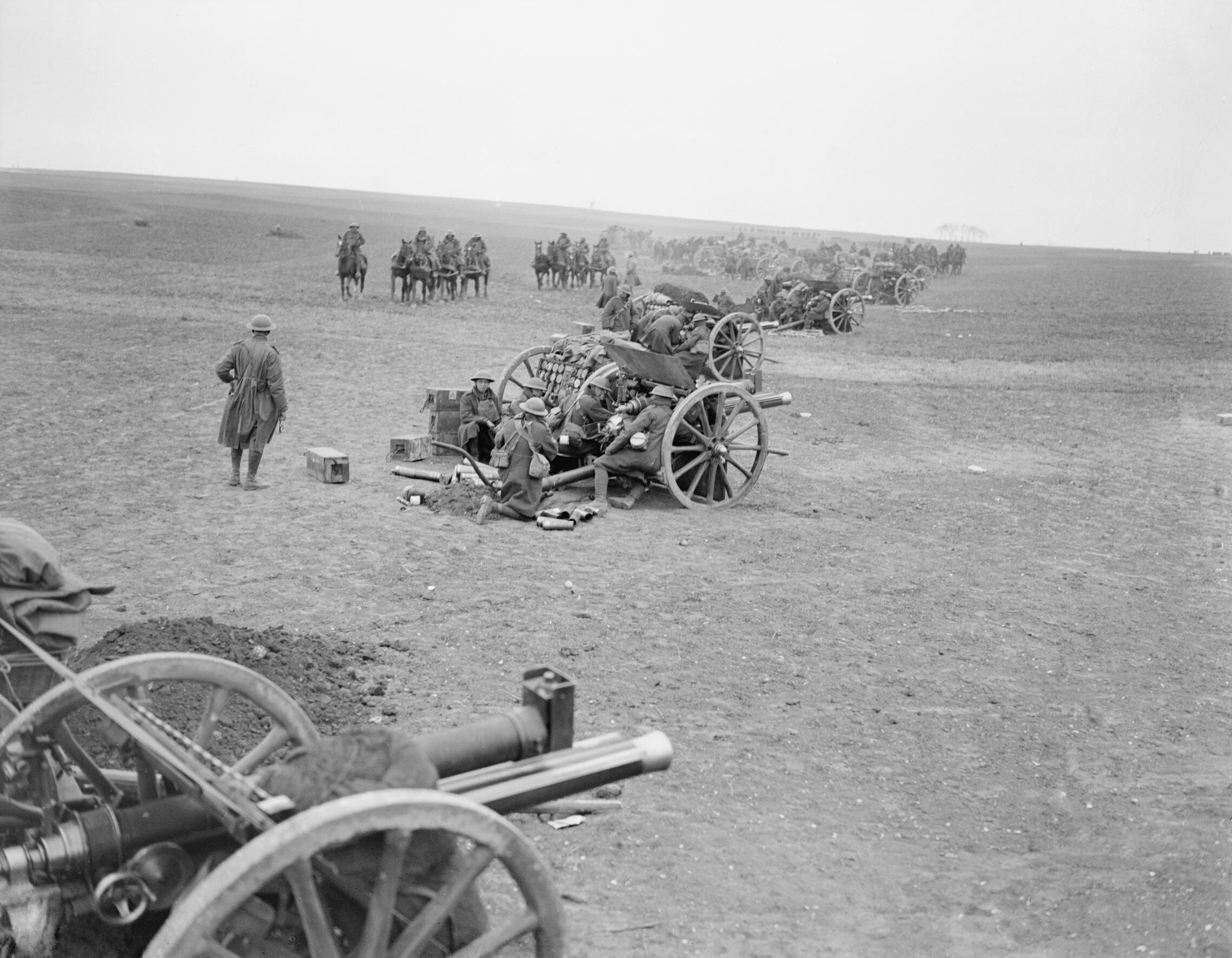
18-pounder battery in action in the open, 28 March 1918.

In November, CCXC Bde got its first rest for eight months, then it was back in the line in the Ypres Salient in December. In January 1918, 58th Division was moved to the area of Villers-Bretonneux in Fifth Army. It was in the front line when the German spring offensive opened on 21 March, and over the next few days was forced back wit heavy casualties. When XXCX Bde was forced to withdraw, it could bring away only eight of its 24 guns, half of them howitzers from D Bty. In the 'Great Retreat' that followed, the battery came into action 18 times. The brigade was then transferred to Amiens where it supported Australian and US troops as well as 58th Division in the Battle of Villers-Bretonneux. A sudden attack on 28 April saw D Bty's position overrun by German troop, but a counter-attack recaptured the guns.

There followed a quiet period for the brigade, then, in August, it was warned for a two-day 'stunt', travelling light, without the men's blankets. This became a continuous two-month series of actions and advances during the Allied Hundred Days Offensive, from Chipilly Wood at the Battle of Amiens (8–11 August) up the Somme Valley via Vaux-sur-Somme, Malard Wood, Clery, Saulcourt, St Emilie and Govy. Even though the infantry of 58th Division were close to exhaustion, the artillery were kept in action. At the Battle of Bapaume (2 September), CCXC Bde fired a creeping barrage for the attack of 47th (2nd London) Division, and at the Battle of Épehy (18 September) it did the same for 18th (Eastern) Division. At 01.00 on 8 October, the brigade fired a barrage for a night attack by 1st Battalion King's Own Yorkshire Light Infantry of 49th (West Riding) Division to break through the Beaurevoir Line.

In October, the brigade was transferred by train to rejoin 58th Division in the Lens area, where it fired its last shots shortly before the Armistice.

After the Armistice came into force, skilled men began to return home. Full demobilisation got under way in March 1919 and 58th Division's artillery left for England on 4 April.

== Interwar ==
When the TF was reconstituted on 7 February 1920, the brigade was reformed at Handel Street, by Captain and Adjutant (later Lieutenant-Colonel) George Dorrell, who as a Battery Sergeant-Major had won a Victoria Cross at Néry in 1914. The brigade once again shared its headquarters with 1st London Regiment. The City of London Artillery was initially numbered 3rd London, but when the TF was reorganised as the Territorial Army it was numbered as the 90th (3rd London), soon afterwards 90th (1st London) Brigade, with the following organisation:

- 357 (1st City of London) Battery
- 358 (2nd City of London) Battery
- 359 (3rd City of London) Battery
- 360 (4th City of London) Battery – formerly 2nd County of London Brigade RFA based at Woolwich Arsenal

When the RFA was subsumed into the Royal Artillery on 1 June 1924, the brigades were redesignated field brigades, RA. In April 1929, the unit's subtitle was changed to 'City of London'. Royal Artillery field brigades were redesignated regiments on 1 November 1938. The prewar expansion of the Territorial Army saw 359 and 360 Batteries split off on 27 April 1939 to form a duplicate regiment at Bloomsbury numbered 138th Field Regiment.

Field regiments were now organised as Regimental HQ (RHQ) and two batteries each of 12 guns. These were 18-pounders of World War I pattern, though now equipped with pneumatic tyres and towed by motorised gun tractors. There was a programme to replace the 18-pdr barrels with that of the new 25-pounder coming into service, giving the hybrid 18/25-pounder.

== World War II ==
=== 90th (City of London) Field Regiment ===
==== Mobilisation ====
The regiment was embodied on 1 September 1939, and on 3 September went to its war station defending London's Royal Docks. By November, it was in Sussex helping to guard Southern England with 1st London Division. At first the regiment was equipped with four 4.5-inch howitzers of World War I vintage. In November 1939, the regiment provided a cadre for the formation of 56 (Newfoundland) Heavy Battery, RA. By the time the Battle of France opened, the regiment was in the Canterbury area, equipped with four 18-pounders and four 18/25-pounders. It provided a party to man anti-aircraft and light machine guns on small craft for the Dunkirk evacuation. By July, the regiment was operating eight French-made 75mm guns of 1897 design and six 25-pounders; a later reorganisation gave it eight 75 mm guns and four 4.5-inch howitzers. It appears to have been fully equipped with modern 25-pounders before proceeding overseas. On 18 November 1940, the division regained its historic number and was renumbered as the 56th (London) Infantry Division.

It was only in the autumn of 1940 that the RA began producing enough battery staffs to start the process of changing regiments from a two-battery to a three-battery organisation. (Three 8-gun batteries were easier to handle, and it meant that each infantry battalion in a brigade could be closely associated with its own battery.) 90th Field Rgt formed 465 Bty on 14 January 1941 while it was stationed at Southport, Lancashire.

In August 1942, the 56th (London) Division embarked for the long voyage to the Middle East, arriving in Iraq in November, where it joined Paiforce. 90th Field Regiment was stationed at Kirkuk and took part in training exercises in Iraq and Iran.

==== North Africa ====
The following March, 168th (London) Infantry Brigade (comprising 1st London Irish Rifles, 1st London Scottish and 10th Royal Berkshire Regiment) and supporting units, including the 90th Field Regiment, was detached from the 56th Division and sent overland to Egypt to join 50th (Northumbrian) Infantry Division, which had suffered heavy casualties in North Africa (including a whole brigade at Gazala), in particular during the Battle of Gazala the year before, and had been withdrawn from the Tunisia Campaign to prepare and train in amphibious warfare for the landings in Sicily (Operation Husky).

==== Sicily ====
The 90th Field Regiment landed at Syracuse in Sicily on 13 July 1943 and went into action three days later, operating round Mount Etna. In October, the 50th Division returned to the United Kingdom to prepare for the Normandy landings in which, once again, it would spearhead the amphibious attack. After initial training with US-supplied M7 Priest self-propelled 105 mm guns, 90 Field Regiment was equipped with Canadian-built Sexton self-propelled 25-pounder guns for this campaign, with Sherman V and Universal Carrier Observation Posts (OPs). The regiment practised landing from tank landing craft (LCTs).

==== D-Day ====
The 90th Field Regiment was assigned to support the assault of 231 Infantry Brigade Group on Jig Beach of the Gold Assault Area, the most westerly assault sector of British Second Army on D-Day. It also had two troops of the 1st Royal Marine Armoured Support Regiment equipped with Centaur IV tanks mounting 95 mm howitzers. At 0650, the Sextons and Centaurs began their shoot from the landing craft on the run-in to the beach. Unfortunately, two control vessels had been lost on the passage across the Channel, so the field artillery were unable to fire at the village of Hamel, which dominated the East end of Jig Beach. When the 1st Battalion, Hampshire Regiment landed and moved towards Hamel, they met heavy fire and suffered casualties among senior officers, artillery observation officers and signallers, and were unable to call down support fire from the SP guns offshore. Only five of the ten Centaurs were able to land, and four of these were quickly put out of action by fire from Hamel. A, C and E Troops of 90 Field Regiment landed at 0825, despite difficulties caused by beach obstacles and the heavy swell, and went into action at 0845. Their Sextons were the first artillery to land on Jig Beach, followed an hour later by B, D and F Troops.

Despite the hold-ups, Hamel was captured later in the day, and after 50th Division's follow-up brigades had landed, 151st Brigade advanced towards Bayeux, supported by 90 Field Regiment's Sextons. By nightfall, they were still three miles short of Bayeux, their objective for the day, but the town fell to 50th Division the following day. In succeeding weeks, the division saw hard fighting in Operation Perch and other actions to expand the bridgehead that had been secured – it took a month to take Hottot, for example. On 30 July, the division led British Second Army's push from Caumont towards Mont Pincon (Operation Bluecoat), which resulted in more heavy fighting before the German resistance in Normandy crumbled a month later.

==== North West Europe ====
At the end of October 1944, the 50th Division, very weak at this time, was broken up to provide infantry drafts to replace casualties in other formations, due to a shortage of infantrymen in the British Army at the time. The 90th Field Regiment was transferred to Second Army control for the remainder of the year. Early in 1945, 90 Field Regiment was supporting formations of First Canadian Army, including 1st Polish Armoured Division and 4th Commando Brigade.

On 4 May 1945, the regiment heard on the wireless that the German forces in NW Europe had surrendered, and the officers drank a bottle of brandy they had bought in Alexandria in 1943, which had gone ashore with the regiment in Sicily and on D-Day.

After Victory in Europe Day, 90 Field Regiment undertook occupation duties at Lünen, under the command of 49th (West Riding) Infantry Division. As postwar demobilisation proceeded, the regiment was placed in suspended animation on 18 May 1946. The regimental war diary for that day says: 'Black Saturday. Regiment ceases to exist until T.A. is reformed, hope this is soon ... Rear party prepares to clear up to hand over in true Gunner style. Long Live 90th'.

=== 138th (City of London) Field Regiment ===
==== Mobilisation ====
On the outbreak of war, 138 Field Regiment mobilised at Handel Street as part of 2nd London Division. Shortly afterwards it moved out to Hertfordshire and Buckinghamshire, and in the summer of 1940 moved to Crickhowell in Wales to continue its training, also on World War I vintage 18-pounders and 4.5-inch howitzers. On 21 November 1940, the division was renumbered as the 47th (London) Infantry Division. The regiment formed its third battery – R Bty – on 9 December 1940 while it was stationed at Newport, Wales. This was numbered 502 Bty on 18 January 1941. During 1941, the regiment spent much of its time in Sussex and Oxfordshire. The regiment was authorised to adopt the 'City of London' subtitle on 17 February 1942.

The 47th Division served in Home Forces throughout the Second World War but, in July 1942, 138th Field Regiment was transferred to help create a new 78th Battleaxe Infantry Division being formed for Operation Torch, the landings in North Africa.

==== Tunisia ====
138 Field Regiment supported 78th Infantry Division during Torch and the succeeding actions in North Africa and the Tunisia Campaign:

- Tebourba Gap, 1–10 December 1942
- Oued Zarga, 7–15 April 1943
- Medjez Plain, 23–30 April 1943
- Tunis, 5–13 May 1943

==== Sicily ====
The Battleaxe Division then prepared for Operation Husky, the Allied invasion of Sicily, where 138 (City of London) Field Regiment fought alongside 90th (City of London) Field Regiment, as part of 50th Division. 78th Division captured Adrano on the slopes of Mount Etna on 3 August 1943.

==== Italy ====
The 78th Division next fought in the Italian Campaign. Landing on 22 September, it participated in breaking through the Barbara Line, crossing the Sangro River and closing up to the German Winter Line 19 November–3 December 1943. 138 Field Regiment supported 78th Division in the following actions during the remainder of the campaign:

- Fourth Battle of Monte Cassino, 11–18 May
- Liri Valley, 18–30 May
- Trasimene Line, 20–30 June
- Advance to Florence, 17 July–30 August
- The Senio, 9–12 April
- Battle of the Argenta Gap, 13–21 April.

78th Infantry Division ended the war in Austria. 138th (City of London) Field Regiment was placed in suspended animation on 10 November 1945 and formally disbanded when the TA reformed on 1 January 1947.

== Postwar ==
The regiment was reconstituted in the TA as 290th Field Regiment, RA (City of London), based once more at Artillery House, Handel Street, which was now shared with the City of London Yeomanry (Rough Riders). It now formed part of 56th (London) Armoured Division. In 1961, 290 Field Regiment merged with 264 (7th London) Field Regiment, 452 Heavy Anti-Aircraft Regiment (London) and 353 (London) Medium Regiment to form a single regiment designated 254 (City of London) Regiment RA, with the following organisation:

- HQ (City of London) Bty at Artillery House, Handel St – from 290 Rgt
- P (7th London) Bty at 86 Fulham High Street – from 264 Rgt
- Q (53rd London) Bty at Horn Lane, Acton – from 353 Rgt

Further reductions in the TA saw 254 Regiment disbanded in 1967 and replaced by S Battery (City of London) in The Greater London Regiment RA. In 1969, following the formation of the Territorial and Army Volunteer Reserve, the battery was reduced to become a detachment of the Headquarters Battery, 100th (Eastern) Medium Regiment, Royal Artillery.

== Honorary Colonels ==
- Prince Alfred, Duke of Edinburgh 1868–75
- 3rd Duke of Buckingham & Chandos, appointed Hon. Col. of 1st Middlesex Administrative Bde 10 July 1865
- Francis, 1st Duke of Teck appointed supernumerary Hon. Col. 15 June 1867
- Lord Mayor of London (ex-officio) from at least 1912 to at least 1939
- Col H.J.P. Oakley, MC, TD, appointed 15 June 1938, died 3 February 1942.

== Memorials ==
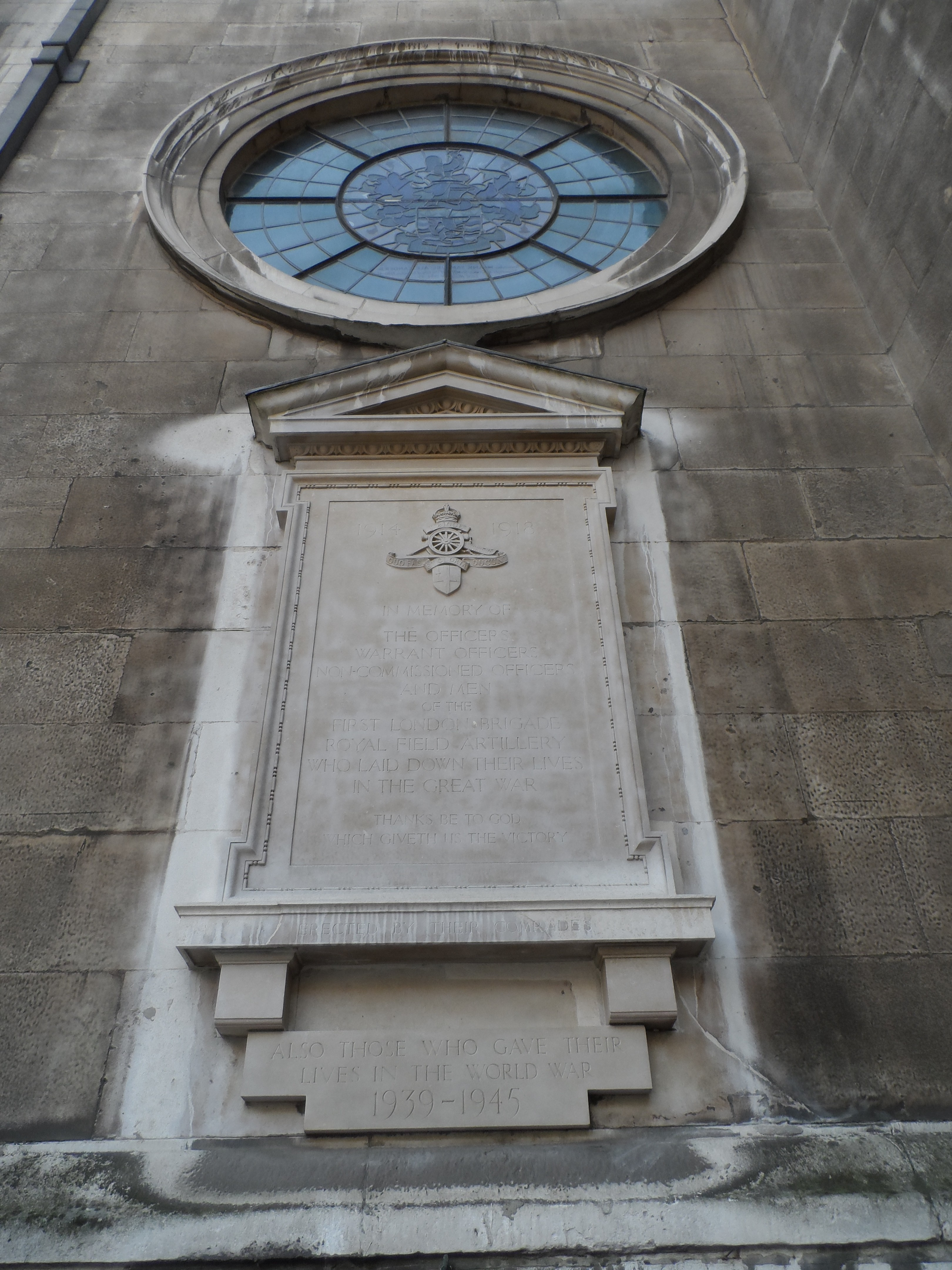
Memorial at St Lawrence Jewry in 2016 after restoration

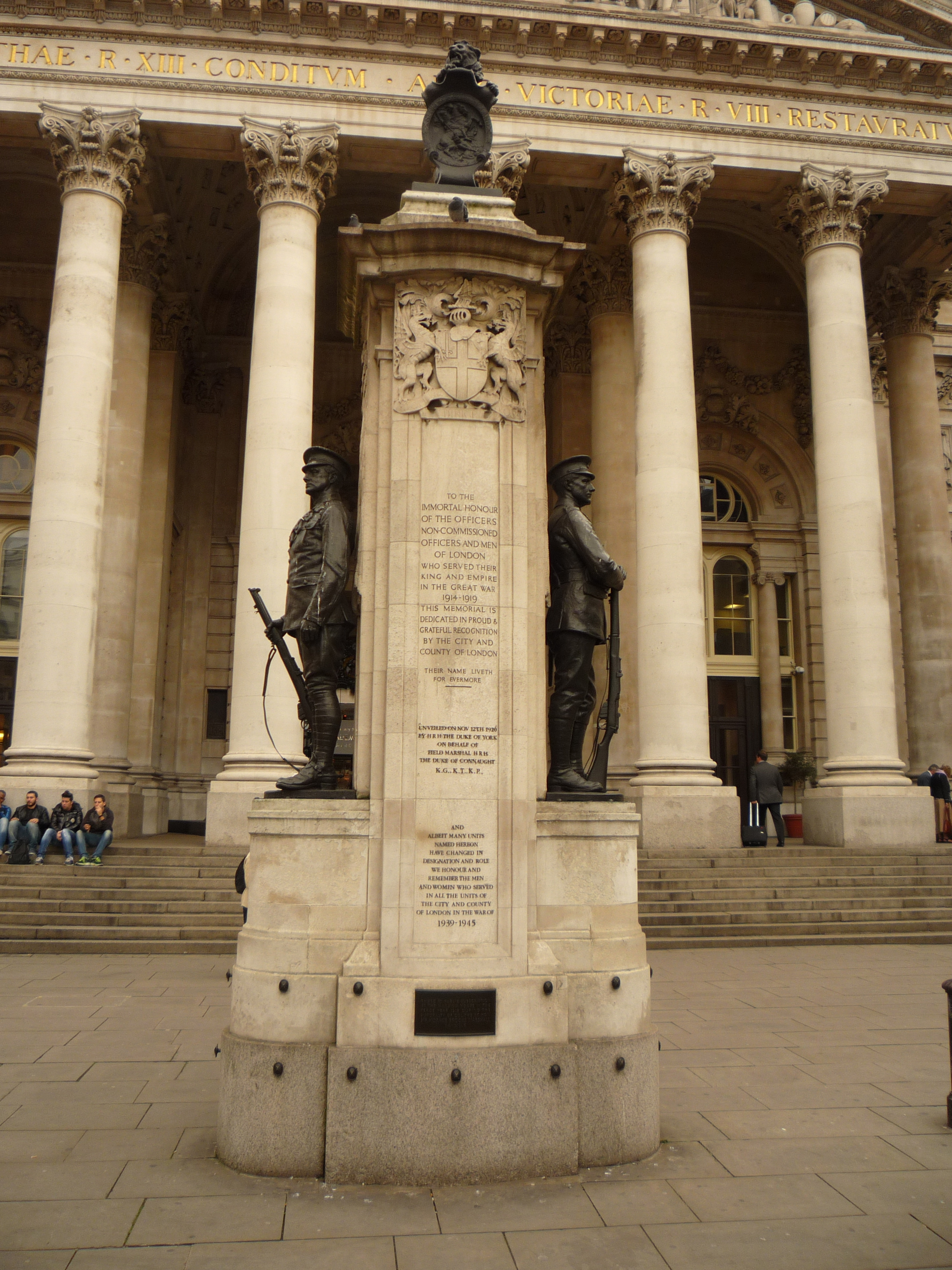
London Troops Memorial in 2013

The World War I memorial plaque of the 1st London Brigade is on the exterior wall of St Lawrence Jewry Church facing Guildhall Yard in the City of London. It depicts the unit's badge: the escutcheon of the City of London's arms surmounted by the badge of the Royal Artillery. The memorial was unveiled by the Lord Mayor on Saturday 22 October 1921, with a Guard of Honour, trumpeters and band from 90th (1st London) Brigade RFA. The brigade is also listed on the City and County of London Troops Memorial in front of the Royal Exchange, with architectural design by Sir Aston Webb and sculpture by Alfred Drury. The left-hand (northern) figure flanking this memorial depicts a Royal Artilleryman representative of the various London Artillery units.

== External sources ==
- Land Forces of Britain, the Empire and Commonwealth
- London Gazette
- The Long, Long Trail
- Orbat.com
- British Army units from 1945 on
- The Royal Artillery 1939–45
- Graham Watson, The Territorial Army 1947
- UK National Inventory of War Memorials
