= John Walmisley =

John Richard Lambert Walmisley (1816–1890) was an English solicitor, Volunteer officer, and prominent oarsman who twice won the Wingfield Sculls, the amateur sculling championship of the River Thames.

== Early life ==
Walmisley was the son of John Angus Walmisley of Westminster and Anna Maria Lambert, daughter of Col. W. Lambert of the East India Company. He was educated at Westminster School.

== Professional career ==
Walmisley became a solicitor in the City of London and was appointed Clerk to the Vestry and Commissioners for Paving of the Parish of St John the Evangelist, Westminster. He held the latter post for over 45 years, though its importance diminished as local government developed in the later 19th century. He was also a Commissioner to Administer Oaths in Chancery, and a Fellow of the Statistical Society.

== Sporting career ==
Walmisley rowed for Thames Club and in 1846 he stroked the Thames Club eight that won the Grand Challenge Cup at Henley Royal Regatta. Also in 1846, he challenged unsuccessfully for the Wingfield Sculls. He won the Wingfield Sculls in 1847 beating H Murray and C Harrington. However he fouled so badly that no one would challenge him in the following year and he won in 1848 by a row over. In November he was a member of the committee that revised the rules of the race. John Walmisley and his youngest brother Walter Milbanke Walmisley (1831–1915) were also noted cricketers for Surrey Club and Ground and for the Honourable Artillery Company.

== Military career ==
In 1850, Walmisley was commissioned as a lieutenant in the Honourable Artillery Company, London's oldest Volunteer regiment. He resigned as a captain four years later.

An invasion scare in 1859 led to the rise of the Volunteer movement, with the creation of many Rifle, Artillery and Engineer Volunteer units composed of part-time soldiers eager to supplement the Regular British Army in time of need. The following year Walmisley served as vice-president of a committee to establish the 'Royal National Rifles' as a 'Brigade for the Defence of the Metropolis ... formed of Artisans and other respectable persons'. Nothing came of this, but on 15 April 1863 the 1st London (City) Artillery Volunteer Corps (AVC) was raised in the City of London and Walmisley was commissioned as captain in command. This Field artillery unit grew quickly, and he was promoted to major-commandant a year later. The unit's first The unit's first Honorary Colonel was the Queen's son, HRH Prince Alfred, Duke of Edinburgh. In 1873 the 1st London AVC became part of the 1st Administrative Brigade of Middlesex Artillery Volunteers under the command of Walmisley, now promoted to lieutenant-colonel.

AVCs proved expensive to maintain, and the Secretary of State for War, Edward Cardwell refused to pay for the upkeep of horses, harness and field-guns from the annual capitation grant. As a result, many Volunteer artillery units were wound up in the 1870s, but the 1st Londons continued strongly and absorbed the 1st Middlesex (Hanover Square) AVC. Walmisley retired in January 1875. His brother Walter served in the 1st London AVC for 27 years, retiring with the rank of major.

== Family life ==
Walmisley married Maria Augustine Graff (née Girault) on 15 August 1841 at St Paul's, Covent Garden. She had been born in Paris about 1807 and had married a copper plate engraver Charles Louis Auguste Graff and had three children who were given up as orphans. After her first husband died she moved to England and registered the birth of a son John Charles Girault Walmisley the year before she married Walmisley. They also had a daughter named Augustine Anna Maria, born about 1847. Walmisley married a second time in 1883. Walmisley died on 17 December 1890 in the Lambeth district at the age of 74.

== External sources ==
- London Gazette
