= Thames Club =

English rowing club

- Home water: Tideway, River Thames

The Thames Club was an English rowing club based on the Tideway of the River Thames that competed in the middle of the 19th century.

The Thames Club was active in the 1840s and 1850s and its first major success was winning the Grand Challenge Cup at Henley Royal Regatta in 1846 with the crew including E. Webb, J. S. Robinson, Francis Playford, L. D. Strutton, and John Walmisley (stroke) with G. Walmisley (cox). Thames Club were runners up in the event in 1848. The club had a succession of wins in the Wingfield Sculls with John Walmisley in 1847 and 1848, Francis Playford in 1849 and E.G Peacock in 1852. At Henley, LD Bruce was runner up in the Silver Wherries with S Wallace in 1848. Peacock and Playford won the Silver Wherries in 1849 and Peacock won the Diamond Challenge Sculls in 1851. Thames came third in the Stewards' Challenge Cup in 1852.

Thames was one of several clubs on the Tideway including Wandle Club, Argonaut Club, St George's Club, Meteor Club and Petrel Club. In 1856 there was a move to combine these clubs into a single club that could compete successfully against the Oxford and Cambridge crews at Henley in the four and eight. To achieve this, the London Rowing Club was formed.

In 1862, the City of London Boat Club decided to rename itself "Thames Rowing Club" and sought and gained the permission of Frank Playford, the only traceable member of "The Thames Club" at the time.

New London, Connecticut is also home to a Thames Club.
