= Farn Carpmael =

English rower

Philip Nevil "Farn" Carpmael (1908–1988) was an English rower who won the Wingfield Sculls twice.

Carpmael was born at Warwick. He was educated at Oundle School and Jesus College, Cambridge. In 1929–30, he was Captain of Jesus College Boat Club, and he rowed in the winning Cambridge crews of the Boat Race in 1930 and 1931 races. He led a team for two years running to Australia where they won easily against extremely tough opposition.

Carpmael joined London Rowing Club and in 1948 was the first winner of the Norfolk Sculls. He won the Wingfield Sculls in 1948 and 1949.

Carpmael was still rowing at the age of 70 against his sons, one of whom also won the Wingfield Sculls.

Carpmael married Anne Wise, widow of Jock Wise. Anne and her former husband had purchased a small cottage, fronting the River Thames at Goring-on-Thames and as surrounding land came up for sale, they bought it to preserve the flora and fauna. Prior to her death in 2003 she established a Charitable Trust to preserve the house and riverside land as Withymead nature reserve.

== See also ==
- List of Cambridge University Boat Race crews
