= Patrick Colquhoun (lawyer) =

British diplomat, legal writer and sculler

Sir Patrick MacChombaich de Colquhoun QC

Chief Justice of the United States of the Ionian Islands
- In office 1861–1864
- Preceded by: Sir Charles Sargent
- Succeeded by: Office abolished

Personal details
- Born: 13 April 1815
- Died: 18 May 1891 (aged 76)
- Profession: Diplomat, writer, sculler

Sir Patrick MacChombaichde Colquhoun QC (/kəˈhuːn/ kə-HOON; 13 April 1815 – 18 May 1891) was a British diplomat, legal writer and sculler who influenced early Cambridge rowing.

Colquhoun was the son of James Colquhoun and Katharine Colquhoun and the grandson of the Patrick Colquhoun who was Lord Provost of Glasgow. He was educated at Westminster and St John's College, Cambridge. In 1837 he won the Wingfield Sculls and in the same year instituted the Colquhoun Sculls at the University of Cambridge.

From 1840 to 1844, Colquhoun was Plenipotentiary of the Hanse Towns at Constantinople, Persia and Greece, through his father's connections. In Constantinople he was close friends with James Redhouse. He encountered the author George Borrow on his travels and was not impressed. He then returned to England and joined the Home Circuit. He was well respected in the literary world and became a Fellow of the Royal Society of Literature in 1845. Charles Leland wrote Who that knows London knoweth not Sir Patrick Colquhoun? I made his acquaintance in 1848, when, coming over from student-life in Paris. He was also a noted linguist. From 1857 to 1866, he was Aulic Counsellor to the King of Saxony and standing Counsel to the Saxon Legation. He was then member of the Supreme Court of Justice in Corfu from 1858 to 1861. In 1861, when he was Chief Justice of the Ionian Islands, he was knighted on 14 November. Colquhoun became Queen's Counsel in 1868 and a bencher of the Inner Temple in 1869.

Colquhoun died at 2 King's Bench Walk at the age of 76. He was a member of the Order of the Temple and associated with fringe Freemasonry.

Colquhoun married Katherine de St Vitalis. Their daughter married Sir James Redhouse.

== Publications ==
- A Summary of the Roman Civil Law 1849-1860 (4 v.)
- Russian Despotism and Ruthlessness: As disclosed in authentic documents 1877
- A Concise History of the Order of the Temple 1878
