= Deaths in February 1996 =

The following is a list of notable deaths in February 1996.

Entries for each day are listed alphabetically by surname. A typical entry lists information in the following sequence:

- Name, age, country of citizenship at birth, subsequent country of citizenship (if applicable), reason for notability, cause of death (if known), and reference.

== February 1996 ==
=== 1 ===
- Adel Adham, 67, Egyptian film actor, pneumonia.
- Sergey Aganov, 78, Soviet/Russian Marshal of the engineer troops.
- Benny Brown, 42, American track and field athlete and Olympic champion (1976), traffic collision.
- Ray Crawford, 80, American fighter ace during World War II and racecar driver.
- Charles Proctor, 90, American Olympic skier (1928).
- Kevin Williams, 38, American gridiron football player in the National Football League (Baltimore Colts), train crash.

=== 2 ===
- Américo Astete, 28, Argentine alpine skier, plane crash.
- Sylwester Braun, 87, Polish photographer and army officer.
- Shamus Culhane, 87, American animator and director.
- Fred S. Keller, 97, American psychologist and a pioneer in experimental psychology.
- Gene Kelly, 83, American actor (Singin' in the Rain, An American in Paris, Anchors Aweigh) and dancer, stroke.
- Vernon Nicholls, 78, British bishop.
- Li Peiyao, 62, Chinese politician, homicide.
- Minao Shibata, 79, Japanese composer and musicologist.
- Aline Towne, 76, American actress.
- Müfide İlhan, 84, Turkish mayor.

=== 3 ===
- Edward Adamson, 84, British artist and art collector.
- Margaret Coughlin, American politician, member of the Washington House of Representatives (1937–1939).
- Larry Eigner, 68, American poet.
- Guy Gilles, 57, French film director, AIDS-related complications.
- Božo Grkinić, 82, Yugoslav water polo and basketball player, coach, and Olympian (1948).
- Hal Hinte, 76, American football player (Green Bay Packers, Pittsburgh Steelers).
- Audrey Meadows, 73, American actress and banker, lung cancer.

=== 4 ===
- Gerry Brand, 89, South African rugby player.
- Willard S. Curtin, 90, American politician, member of the United States House of Representatives (1957-1967).
- Vyacheslav Domani, 48, Russian Olympic volleyball player (1972).
- Manolo Fábregas, 74, Spanish-Mexican actor, film director and film producer.
- John Hugo Loudon, 90, Dutch businessman and CEO of Royal Dutch Shell.
- Norris Phillips, 79, American baseball player.
- Lakshman Singh, 85, Indian scouting leader.
- Allan Strang, 74, Australian rules footballer.

=== 5 ===
- Max Fresson, 83, French Olympic equestrian (1948, 1960).
- Gianandrea Gavazzeni, 86, Italian musician.
- Edward Jackson, 70, Australian rules footballer.
- Hideo Oguni, 91, Japanese screenwriter.
- Roberto Raviola, 56, Italian comic book artist, pancreatic cancer.
- Tom Re, 83, Australian rules footballer.
- Lim Chin Siong, 62, Singaporean politician, heart attack.
- Antonio Ruiz Soler, 74, Spanish dancer and choreographer.
- Ted Tyson, 86, Australian rules football player.
- Gary Zeller, 48, American basketball player (Baltimore Bullets, New York Nets).

=== 6 ===
- Georges de Wilde, 95, French Olympic speed skater (1924).
- Guy Madison, 74, American actor (The Adventures of Wild Bill Hickok), pulmonary emphysema.
- Bob Muncrief, 80, American baseball player.
- Renee Roberts, 87, British actress.
- Patsy Smart, 77, British actress.
- Jacques Wertheimer, 84, French businessman.
- Notable people killed in the crash of Birgenair Flight 301:
  - Zbigniew Gorzelańczyk, 51, Polish politician, member of the Sejm (since 1993).
  - Marek Wielgus, 45, Polish politician, member of the Sejm (since 1993).

=== 7 ===
- Lydia Chukovskaya, 88, Soviet/Russian writer, poet, editor, publicist, and dissident.
- Jack Cooper, 84, Australian rules footballer.
- I. K. Dairo, 65, Nigerian Jùjú musician.
- Phillip Davidson, 80, American lieutenant general.
- Barbara Hamilton, 69, Canadian actress, breast cancer.
- Lucien Maynard, 87, Canadian politician.
- Robert, Archduke of Austria-Este, 80, Austrian prince and Archduke of Austria-Este.
- Boris Tchaikovsky, 70, Soviet and Russian composer.
- Red Webb, 71, American baseball player (New York Giants).
- Pat West, 72, American gridiron football player (Cleveland/Los Angeles Rams, Green Bay Packers).
- Ernst Würthwein, 86, German theologian.

=== 8 ===
- T. J. Campion, 77, American football player (Philadelphia Eagles).
- Marcel Capelle, 91, French football player.
- Mercer Ellington, 76, American musician, composer, and arranger, heart attack.
- Del Ennis, 70, American baseball player, diabetes.
- Ri Sung Gi, 90, North Korean chemist.
- Bruno Hussar, 84, Egyptian priest.
- Siavash Kasraie, 68, Iranian poet, literary critic, and novelist.
- José Poy, 69, Argentine football player and manager.
- Felice Schwartz, 71, American feminist writer.
- Johan Van Den Steen, 67, Belgian Olympic water polo player (1952, 1964).
- Vladimír Vaina, 86, Czech Olympic rower (1936).
- Derek Worlock, 76, English catholic prelate and Archbishop of Liverpool, lung cancer.

=== 9 ===
- Chitti Babu, 59, Indian musician.
- Sir George Trevelyan, 4th Baronet, 89, British baronet and a founding father of the New Age movement.
- Adolf Borchers, 82, German Luftwaffe flying ace during World War II.
- Stephen Hope Carlill, 93, British Royal Navy admiral.
- Yun Chi-Young, 97, Korean politician.
- Alistair Cameron Crombie, 80, Australian zoologist and historian of science.
- Neil Franklin, 74, English football player and manager.
- Adolf Galland, 83, German Luftwaffe flying ace and general during World War II.
- Johanna Hall, 61, British Olympic equestrian (1960, 1964, 1968).
- Gerald Savory, 86, English playwright and screenwriter specialising in comedies.
- Gordon D. Shirreffs, 82, American writer.
- Robin Stille, 34, American actress (The Slumber Party Massacre), suicide.

=== 10 ===
- Josette Bruce, 76, Polish-French novelist.
- Björn-Erik Höijer, 88, Swedish writer.
- Giovanni Pontiero, 64, British scholar.
- Klaus-Dieter Seehaus, 53, German Olympic football player (1964).

=== 11 ===
- Olle Åhlund, 75, Swedish footballer and Olympian (1952).
- Thecla Boesen, 85, Danish film actress.
- William F. Claxton, 81, American television director and television producer.
- Brian Daley, 48, American writer, pancreatic cancer.
- Charles Imbault, 86, French Olympic field hockey player (1936).
- Kebby Musokotwane, 49, Zambian politician and Prime Minister.
- Quarentinha, 62, Brazilian football player, heart failure.
- Phil Regan, 89, American actor and singer.
- Amelia Rosselli, 65, Italian poet, suicide.
- Gertrude Sawyer, 100, American architect.
- Bob Shaw, 64, Northern Irish science fiction author and novelist, cancer.
- Pierre Edouard Leopold Verger, 93, French photographer, anthropologist, and writer.

=== 12 ===
- Andrea Barbato, 61, Italian journalist, writer and politician.
- Gina Falckenberg, 88, German actress.
- Alois Kuhn, 85, German Olympic ice hockey player (1936).
- Betty Roland, 92, Australian playwright and novelist.
- Ernest Samuels, 92, American biographer and lawyer.
- Ryōtarō Shiba, 72, Japanese writer.

=== 13 ===
- Martin Balsam, 76, American actor (A Thousand Clowns, 12 Angry Men, Psycho), Oscar winner (1966), heart attack.
- Scott Beach, 65, American actor (American Graffiti, Stand by Me, The Right Stuff) and disc jockey.
- Charlie Conerly, 74, American gridiron football player (New York Giants).
- George Jefferson, 85, American Olympic pole vaulter (1932).
- Léopold Langlois, 82, Canadian politician.
- Cynthia MacGregor, 31, American tennis player, complications from anorexia nervosa.
- Branko Marjanović, 86, Croatian film director and editor.
- Cy Proffitt, 84, American basketball player.
- Ugyen Rinpoche, 76, Tibetan Buddhist Lama.

=== 14 ===
- Ernie Barker, 82, Australian Olympic equestrian (1956).
- Lady Caroline Blackwood, 64, British writer and journalist, cancer.
- Louis Finot, 86, French footballer.
- Helge Halkjær, 79, Danish Olympic rower (1948).
- Fritz Hanson, 81, American-Canadian gridiron football player.
- Eva Hart, 91, British survivor of the sinking of RMS Titanic, cancer.
- Gied Jaspars, 56, Dutch television producer, colorectal cancer.
- Čeněk Kottnauer, 85, Czech-British chess master.
- Eddie Marks, 71, Irish cricketer.
- Alejandro de la Sota Martínez, 82, Spanish architect.
- Drago Matulaj, 84, Croatian Olympic rower (1936).
- Bob Paisley, 77, English football player and manager, Alzheimer's disease.
- Francisco Tomás y Valiente, 63, Spanish jurist, historian, and writer, homicide.
- Sylvester Veitch, 85, American horse trainer.
- Mark Venturini, 35, American actor (Friday the 13th: A New Beginning, The Return of the Living Dead, Mikey), leukemia.

=== 15 ===
- Lucio Agostini, 82, Italian-Canadian musician.
- Don Condon, 72, Australian rules footballer.
- Margaret Courtenay, 72, Welsh actress.
- Peter Gardner, 71, Australian hurdler and Olympian (1948).
- Edward Madejski, 81, Polish football player and Olympian (1936).
- Ron McCann, 82, Australian rules footballer.
- Tommy Rettig, 54, American child actor (Lassie), database programmer, and author, heart attack.
- Henri Simonet, 64, Belgian politician.
- McLean Stevenson, 68, American actor (M*A*S*H, Hello, Larry, The Doris Day Show) and comedian, heart attack.
- Brunó Ferenc Straub, 82, Hungarian biochemist.
- Sybren Valkema, 79, Dutch glass artist, founder of the European Studio Glass Movement.

=== 16 ===
- Roberto Aizenberg, 67, Argentine painter and sculptor.
- Roger Bowen, 63, American actor (M*A*S*H, Arnie, Tunnel Vision), heart attack.
- Pat Brown, 90, American lawyer and politician and Governor of California.
- Nicolae Carandino, 90, Romanian writer.
- Gordon Drummond Clancy, 83, Canadian politician, member of the House of Commons of Canada (1958-1968).
- Eleanor Clark, 82, American writer.
- Hank Gornicki, 85, American baseball player (St. Louis Cardinals, Chicago Cubs, Pittsburgh Pirates).
- Bert Iannone, 79, Canadian football player.
- Stasys Janušauskas, 93, Lithuanian Olympic footballer (1924).
- Miloš Kopecký, 73, Czech actor.
- Jón Kristjánsson, 75, Icelandic Olympic cross-country skier (1952, 1956).
- Brownie McGhee, 80, American folk-blues singer and guitarist, stomach cancer.
- Kenneth Robinson, 84, British politician.
- Ernst Weber, 94, Austrian-American electrical engineer, and microwave technology pioneer.

=== 17 ===
- Hervé Bazin, 84, French writer.
- Gus Hardin, 50, American country music singer, car accident.
- Andy Lapihuska, 73, American baseball player (Philadelphia Phillies).
- Evelyn Laye, 95, English actress, respiratory failure.
- Michael Keith Nunes, 78, Jamaican Olympic sailor (1972).
- Michel Pablo, 84, Greek Trotskyist leader, stroke.
- Nikolai Starostin, 93, Soviet/Russian football player and founder of Spartak Moscow.

=== 18 ===
- Margery Hinton, 80, English swimmer and Olympian (1928, 1932, 1936).
- Madhaviah Krishnan, 83, Indian photographer.
- Janice Loeb, 93, American film director, screenwriter, cinematographer and film producer.
- Andy Marefos, 78, American football player (New York Giants, Los Angeles Dons).
- Josef Meinrad, 82, Austrian actor, cancer.
- Edward O'Brien, 21, Northern Irish IRA volunteer, killed.

=== 19 ===
- Sehba Akhtar, 65, Indian poet and songwriter, heart attack.
- Brenda Bruce, 76, British actress.
- Marco Antonio Campos, 76, Mexican actor, aortic aneurysm.
- Antonio Creus, 71, Spanish motorcycle racer and racing driver.
- Charles O. Finley, 77, American businessman.
- Douglas Livingstone, 64, South African poet.
- Ernest Manning, 87, Canadian politician.
- Dorothy Maynor, 85, American singer.
- Grant Sawyer, 77, American politician and Governor of Nevada.

=== 20 ===
- Solomon Asch, 88, Polish-American psychologist.
- Charles O. Finley, 77, American businessman.
- Walter Marshall, Baron Marshall of Goring, 63, British peer and scientist.
- Viktor Konovalenko, 57, Soviet Union ice hockey player and Olympian (1964, 1968).
- Mariano Vidal Molina, 70, Argentinian actor.
- Carolyn Morris, 70, American baseball player.
- Audrey Munson, 104, American artist's model and film actress.
- Jeffrey Quill, 83, British test pilot.
- Frank Sheppard, 90, Canadian ice hockey player (Detroit Cougars).
- Tōru Takemitsu, 65, Japanese composer and writer, bladder cancer.

=== 21 ===
- Priscilla Bonner, 97, American silent film actress.
- Rune Börjesson, 58, Swedish football player.
- Hans-Joachim Bremermann, 69, German-American mathematician and biophysicist, cancer.
- Isolina Carrillo, 88, Cuban musician.
- Vahagn Davtyan, 73, Armenian writer.
- H. L. Gold, 81, American writer.
- Morton Gould, 82, American composer, conductor, arranger, and pianist.
- Elmer Jones, 75, American football player (Detroit Lions).
- August Kammer, 83, American Olympic ice hockey player (1936), and golfer.
- Don Laz, 66, American pole vaulter and Olympian (1952).
- Ray Smith, 81, English cricketer.

=== 22 ===
- George Christopher Archibald, 69, British economist and researcher.
- Karl Boo, 77, Swedish politician.
- Elwood Henneman, 81, American neurophysiologist.
- Hans Iklé, 89, Swiss Olympic equestrian (1936).
- Niall MacDermot, 79, British politician.

=== 23 ===
- Hussein Kamel al-Majid, 41, Iraqi general, politician and defector, killed.
- Joseph W. Barr, 78, American politician.
- David Berlo, 67, American communications theorist.
- William Bonin, 49, American serial killer and sex offender known as the Freeway Killer, execution by lethal injection.
- Birgit Brüel, 68, Danish actress and singer.
- Elisa Cegani, 84, Italian actress.
- Alan Dawson, 66, American musician.
- Gordon Goldsberry, 68, American baseball player (Chicago White Sox, St. Louis Browns).
- Dorothy Awes Haaland, 77, American lawyer and politician.
- Saddam Kamel, 35, Iraqi head of the Republican Guard and defector, killed.
- Billy Lothridge, 54, American gridiron football player, heart attack.
- Helmut Schön, 80, German football player and manager.
- Charlie Sloley, 89, Australian rules footballer.

=== 24 ===
- Akram al-Hawrani, 84, Syrian politician.
- Winston Chang, 54, Taiwanese academic and university president.
- Graeme Moran, 57, New Zealand rower.
- Kaarlo Niilonen, 73, Finnish football player and manager.
- Charles Edward Pratt, 84, American-Canadian architect and Olympic rower (1932).
- James Runcieman Sutherland, 95, English literary scholar.
- Franco Zucchi, 78, Italian Olympic sailor (1960).

=== 25 ===
- Caio Fernando Abreu, 47, Brazilian writer, AIDS-related complications.
- Vehbi Koç, 94, Turkish businessman and philanthropist, heart attack.
- Elvy Lissiak, 66, Italian actress.
- Haing S. Ngor, 55, Cambodian-American physician and actor (The Killing Fields, Heaven & Earth, My Life), Oscar winner (1985), shot.

=== 26 ===
- Jean Boisselier, 83, French archaeologist and art historian.
- Anna Larina, 82, Soviet/Russian writer.
- Don Oliver, 58, New Zealand weightlifter, fitness centre owner, and Olympian (1960, 1964, 1968), cancer.
- José Robinson, 51, Mexican Olympic diver (1964, 1968, 1972).
- John Dalrymple, 13th Earl of Stair, 89, Scottish Arl.
- Mieczysław Weinberg, 76, Polish-Soviet/Russian composer.
- Carlos Wilson, 83, Argentinian football player.

=== 27 ===
- Gerrit Berkhoff, 94, Dutch chemist and the first Rector Magnificus of the University of Twente.
- François Chaumette, 72, French actor, cancer.
- Ethlyne Clair, 91, American actress.
- Laurie Connell, 50, Australian businessman and fraudster.
- Sarah Palfrey Cooke, 83, American tennis player, lung cancer.
- Giordano De Giorgi, 77, Italian Olympic wrestler (1952).
- Kenneth Granviel, 45, American serial killer, execution by lethal injection.
- Vic Janowicz, 66, American gridiron football and baseball player (Ohio State Buckeyes, Pittsburgh Pirates, Washington Redskins), cancer.
- Robert Kühner, 92, French mycologist.
- Iain Murray, 10th Duke of Atholl, 64, British politician.
- Willy Rist, 84, Swiss Olympic diver (1948).
- Pat Smythe, 67, British equestrian and Olympian (1956, 1960).
- Ilario Zannino, 75, American mobster and member of the Patriarca crime family.

=== 28 ===
- Daniel Chipenda, 64, Angolan politician.
- Eric Harrower, 88, Australian rules footballer.
- Jorge Mathias, 71, Portuguese Olympic equestrian (1960).
- Maximilien Rubel, 90, Soviet-French Marxist historian.
- Bill Smith, 61, American poker player.
- Bruno von Freytag-Löringhoff, 83, German philosopher, mathematician and epistemologist.
- Sylvia Williams, 60, American museum director, curator, art historian and scholar of African art, brain aneurysm.

=== 29 ===
- Haydar Aşan, 89, Turkish-American athlete and Olympian (1928).
- Frank Daniel, 69, Czech director and scriptwriter, heart attack.
- Wes Farrell, 56, American musician, songwriter and record producer, cancer.
- Helmuth Fischer, 85, German swimmer and Olympian (1936).
- Aubrey Fowler, 75, American football player (Baltimore Colts).
- Ewart John Arlington Harnum, 85, Canadian businessman and the lieutenant governor of Newfoundland.
- Shams Pahlavi, 78, Iranian royal of the Pahlavi dynasty and elder sister of the last Shah of Iran, cancer.
- James van Rensburg, 71, South African Olympic weightlifter (1952).
- Sinclair Ross, 88, Canadian banker and writer, Parkinson's disease.
- Ralph Rowe, 71, American baseball player and manager.
- Winifred C. Stanley, 86, American politician and attorney.
- Clint Wager, 76, American gridiron football player and basketball player.
- Mario Zagari, 82, Italian journalist and politician.
