= Deaths in December 1991 =

The following is a list of notable deaths in December 1991.

Entries for each day are listed alphabetically by surname. A typical entry lists information in the following sequence:

- Name, age, country of citizenship at birth, subsequent country of citizenship (if applicable), reason for notability, cause of death (if known), and reference.

== December 1991 ==
=== 1 ===
- Ernst Albrecht, 77, German politician and member of the Bundestag.
- Charles D. Breitel, 82, American lawyer and politician.
- Karl Chmielewski, 88, German SS officer and concentration camp commandant.
- Barbara Hanrahan, 52, Australian artist, printmaker and writer.
- Zin Harris, 64, New Zealand cricket player.
- Thomas J. Hillery, 87, American politician.
- Robert Kerber, 78, American Olympic swimmer (1932).
- Jim Knox, 72, New Zealand trade unionist.
- Buster Mills, 83, American baseball player, coach, and scout.
- Pat O'Callaghan, 85, Irish Olympic hammer thrower (1928, 1932).
- Pyotr Pochynchuk, 37, Soviet and Russian athlete and Olympic medalist (1980).
- Alden Sanborn, 92, American rower and Olympic champion (1920).
- George Stigler, 80, American economist and Nobel Prize laureate (1982), heart failure.

=== 2 ===
- Ernst Achenbach, 82, German politician.
- Jim McCarthy, 71, American football player.
- Bimal Mitra, 79, Indian writer.
- Tracy D. Terrell, 48, American education theorist, AIDS.
- John J. Tolson, 76, United States Army lieutenant general.
- Eleanor Tufts, 64, American art historian and academic, ovarian cancer.

=== 3 ===
- René Brossy, 85, French Olympic cyclist (1928).
- Andrej Engel, 81, Slovak Olympic sprinter (1932).
- Arthur Fischer, 94, Swedish actor, writer, and sculptor.
- Jack Laird, 68, American screenwriter, heart disease.
- George Lott, 85, American tennis player and coach.
- Petre Țuțea, 89, Romanian philosopher, journalist, and economist.

=== 4 ===
- Cliff Bastin, 79, English football player.
- Moysés Baumstein, 60, Brazilian artist.
- Bert T. Combs, 80, American jurist and politician, hypothermia.
- Alex Graham, 78, Scottish cartoonist (Fred Basset).
- Orestes Jordán, 78, Peruvian Olympic footballer (1936).
- Eugen Maucher, 79, German politician and member of the Bundestag.
- Dan McGee, 80, American baseball player (Boston Braves).
- Brian Randall, 71, Australian rules footballer.
- Irving Taylor, 72, Canadian Olympic ice hockey player (1948).
- Herb Thomas, 90, American baseball player and manager (Boston Braves, New York Giants).
- Norman Wykes, 85, English cricketer.

=== 5 ===
- Earl Evans, 91, American gridiron football player (Chicago Cardinals, Chicago Bears).
- Robert Karvelas, 70, American actor (Get Smart).
- Aad Mansveld, 47, Dutch footballer, cancer.
- Héctor Orezzoli, 38, Argentine stage director and costume-, set-, and lighting designer, cardiopulmonary arrest.
- Richard Speck, 49, American convicted mass murderer, heart attack.
- Dimitrije Stefanović, 95, Yugoslav Olympic long-distance runner (1928).
- Jack Trevor Story, 74, English novelist.
- Roy Welensky, 84, Northern Rhodesian politician and Prime Minister.
- Hein van der Zee, 62, Dutch boxer and Olympian (1952).

=== 6 ===
- Rodney Ackland, 83, English playwright, actor, and screenwriter.
- György Aczél, 74, Hungarian communist politician.
- Vladimir Colin, 70, Romanian author.
- Virgilio Corbo, 73, Italian archaeologist.
- Vishnu Madhav Ghatage, 83, Indian aeronautical engineer.
- Tsuguhiro Hattori, 71, Japanese baseball player.
- Terry Slater, 54, Canadian ice hockey player and coach.
- Mimi Smith, 85, British nurse and secretary, aunt and parental guardian of musician John Lennon.
- Sir Richard Stone, 78, British economist, Nobel Prize laureate (1984), pneumonia.

=== 7 ===
- Jute Bell, 91, American baseball player.
- Judith Hart, 67, British politician, cancer.
- Herb Jaffe, 70, American film producer (Fright Night), cancer.
- Ataur Rahman Khan, 86, Bangladeshi lawyer, politician and Prime Minister.
- Spiro Kostof, 55, American architectural historian, and academic, cancer.
- Gordon Pirie, 60, English Olympic runner (1952, 1956, 1960), cholangiocarcinoma.

=== 8 ===
Francisco de Assis Barbosa

- Francisco de Assis Barbosa, 77, Brazilian essayist, historian, and journalist.
- Kimberly Bergalis, 23, American HIV/AIDS activists
- Buck Clayton, 80, American trumpeter.
- Agaath Doorgeest, 77, Dutch Olympic hurdler (1936).
- Fyodor Konstantinov, 90, Soviet Marxist–Leninist philosopher and academician
- Ulysses S. Grant IV, 83, American geologist and paleontologist
- Attila Laták, 46, Hungarian Olympic wrestler (1972).
- Bill Lewis, 75, Australian politician
- Dove Kull, 94, American social worker and activist
- John McLaughlin, 86, Canadian politician

=== 9 ===
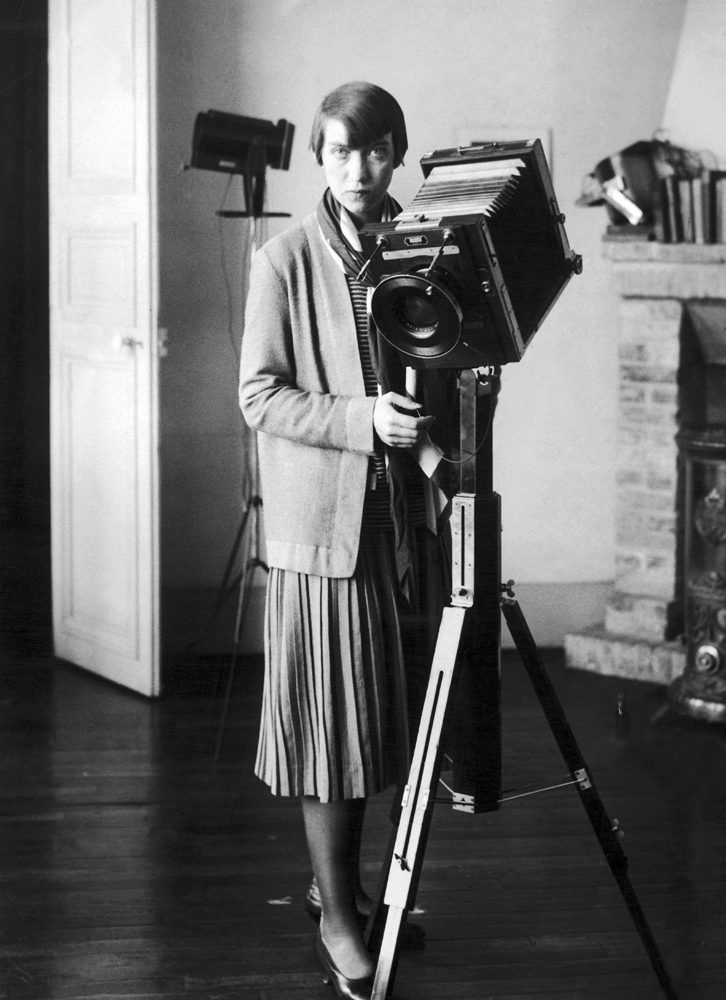
Berenice Abbott

- Berenice Abbott, 93, American photographer.
- Olga Bondareva, 54, Soviet mathematician and economist, traffic accident.
- Ken Day, 72, English cricketer
- David Hodge, 82, Scottish politician
- Maurice Joyeux, 81, French writer and anarchist.
- Greta Kempton, 90, American artist, heart failure.
- Gisèle Lestrange, 64, French graphic artist.
- Rizvan Teymurov, 24, Azerbaijani military officer

=== 10 ===
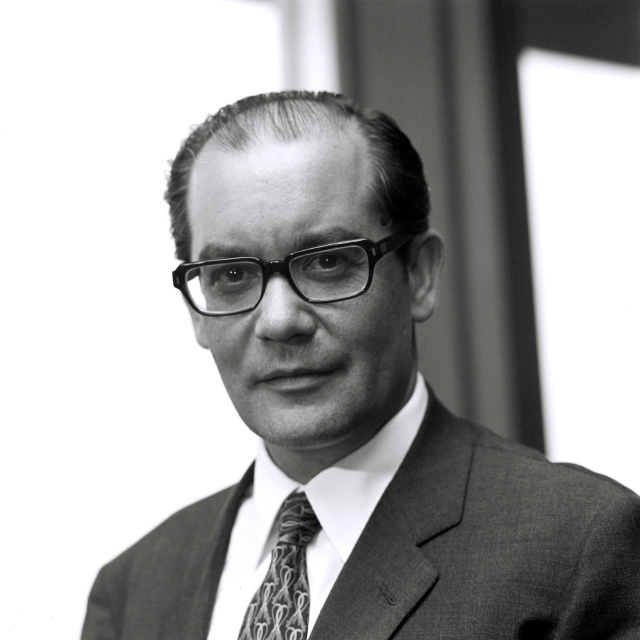
Franco Maria Malfatti

- Mark Faber, 41, English cricket player, complications from surgery.
- Iain Finlayson, 39, British Olympic alpine skier (1972).
- Tippy Larkin, 74, American boxer, kidney failure.
- Franco Maria Malfatti, 64, Italian politician, president of the European Commission (1970–1972).
- José María Cabo Puig, 84, Spanish football player and manager.
- Ed Murphy, 73, American baseball player (Philadelphia Phillies).
- Jean Rigaux, 82, French songwriter and actor.
- Gustav Schäfer, 85, German Olympic rower (1936).
- György Szűcs, 79, Hungarian football player.

=== 11 ===
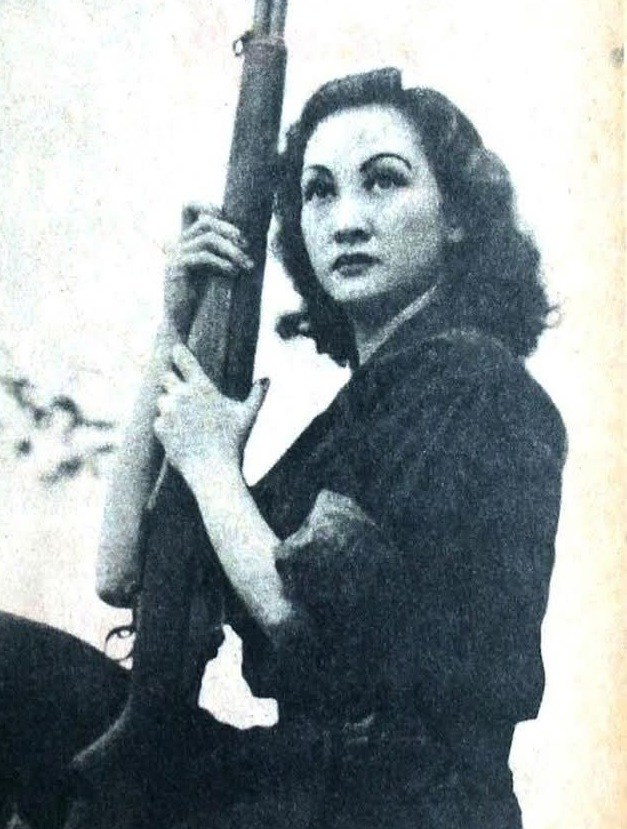
Carmen Rosales

- Enid Moodie Heddle, 87, Australian poet, editor children's writer.
- Kavisena Herath, 75, Ceylonese politician.
- Dick Kelley, 51, American baseball player (Milwaukee/Atlanta Braves, San Diego Padres).
- Robert Q. Lewis, 70, American television personality (What's My Line?) and actor, pulmonary emphysema.
- Artur Lundkvist, 85, Swedish writer.
- Matthew Rapf, 71, American television producer (Kojak, Ben Casey, The Loretta Young Show), influenza.
- Carmen Rosales, 74, Filipina actress and guerilla fighter during World War II.
- Joe Scibelli, 52, American gridiron football player (Los Angeles Rams).
- Simon Scott, 71, American actor (Trapper John, M.D., McHale's Navy, Cold Turkey), Alzheimer's disease.
- Mudiyanse Tennakoon, 57, Sri Lankan politician.
- Mario Tobino, 81, Italian poet, writer and psychiatrist.
- Pat Walshe, 91, American dwarf actor and circus performer, heart attack.

=== 12 ===
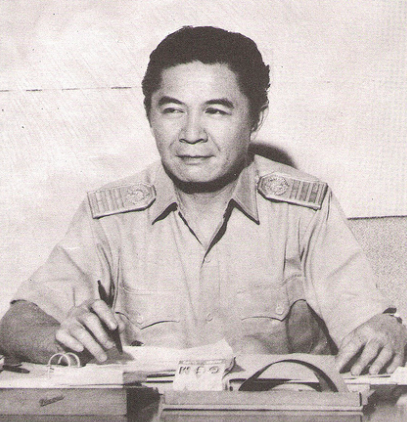
Henk Ngantung

- Eleanor Boardman, 93, American actress (The Crowd).
- Moshe Castel, 82, Israeli painter.
- Joaquim Gomis, 89, Spanish photographer, entrepreneur, and art collector.
- Harold St. John, 99, American botanist and academic.
- Ken Keltner, 75, American baseball player (Cleveland Indians, Boston Red Sox).
- Peter Kienast, 42, Austrian Olympic bobsledder (1984, 1988).
- Henk Ngantung, 64, Indonesian painter and politician.
- Ted Rippon, 77, Australian rules footballer.
- Ronnie Ross, 58, British saxophonist, cancer.
- Marvin Stout, 76, American basketball player.
- Olli Ungvere, 85, Estonian actress.
- Amherst Villiers, 91, English engineer and painter.
- Richard Wyndham, 80, Canadian Olympic swimmer (1932).

=== 13 ===
Marcelle Bunlet

- Marcelle Bunlet, 91, French soprano
- Stuart Challender, 44, Australian conductor, AIDS-related complications.
- André Pieyre de Mandiargues, 82, French writer.
- Jan Hendriks, 63, German film actor.
- Judy Moorcroft, 58, British costume designer (A Passage to India, The Europeans, The Killing Fields).
- Vincent Saurin, 84, French rower and Olympian (1928).

=== 14 ===
- John Arlott, 77, English broadcaster (Test Match Special).
- Guillermo Barreto, 62, Cuban drummer and timbalero.
- Larry Ciaffone, 67, American baseball player (St. Louis Cardinals).
- Robert Eddison, 83, English actor (Indiana Jones and the Last Crusade), pneumonia.
- Claude Faraggi, 49, French writer.
- Nikolay Gusakov, 57, Soviet Nordic combined skier and Olympic medalist (1956, 1960, 1964).
- J. C. Hamilton, 78, American baseball player.
- Josephus Serré, 84, Dutch Olympic modern pentathlete (1936).

=== 15 ===
- Reidar Andersen, 80, Norwegian ski jumper and Olympic medalist (1936).
- Grete Mostny, 77, Austrian-Chilean anthropologist, cancer.
- Ray Smith, 55, Welsh actor, heart attack.
- Sid Youngelman, 60, American gridiron football player.
- Vasily Zaytsev, 76, Soviet sniper during World War II and Hero of the Soviet Union.

=== 16 ===
- Ged Baldwin, 84, Canadian politician, member of the House of Commons of Canada (1958-1980).
- H. C. Casserley, 88, British photographer.
- Herbert Hobein, 84, German Olympic field hockey player (1928).
- Horatio Luro, 90, American racehorse trainer, pancreatic cancer.
- Aurélien Noël, 87, Canadian politician, member of the House of Commons of Canada (1967-1972).
- Fred Scott, 89, American actor.
- Pier Vittorio Tondelli, 36, Italian writer, AIDS-related complications.
- Mohammad Javad Tondguyan, 41, Iranian engineer and politician.
- Leopold Vogl, 81, Austrian football player and manager.

=== 17 ===
- Mitsuo Aida, 67, Japanese poet, brain hemorrhage.
- John Anton Blatnik, 80, American politician, member of the U.S. House of Representatives (1947–1974).
- Heinz Brücher, 76, German-Argentine botanist and SS officer during World War II, murdered.
- Jim Cunningham, 56, American basketball player.
- Jesse Flores, 77, Mexican Major League Baseball player (Chicago Cubs, Philadelphia Athletics, Cleveland Indians).
- Armand Frappier, 87, Canadian physisican.
- Chen Wen Hsi, 85, Chinese-Singaporean artist.
- Carl Shy, 83, American Olympic basketball player (1936).
- Joey Smallwood, 90, Canadian politician.
- Ronnie Starling, 82, English football player.
- Kurt Weyher, 90, German rear admiral of the navy (Kriegsmarine) of Nazi Germany.

=== 18 ===
- George Abecassis, 78, British racing driver.
- Richard Bruck, 76, American mathematician.
- Kerry Fitzgerald, 43, Australian rugby referee.
- King Kolax, 79, American jazz trumpeter and bandleader, Alzheimer's disease.
- Jean Orcibal, 78, French historian on religion.
- Marion L. Starkey, 90, American historian.
- June Storey, 73, Canadian-American actress, cancer.

=== 19 ===
- Joe Cole, 30, American roadie (Rollins Band, Black Flag), shot.
- Howie Dallmar, 69, American basketball player (Philadelphia Warriors), heart failure.
- Rudolf Eggenberg, 80, Swiss Olympic high jumper (1936).
- Ernest K. Gann, 81, American aviator, sailor, and author (Fate Is the Hunter, The High and the Mighty), kidney failure.
- Pearley Johnson, 86, American baseball player.
- Paul Maxwell, 70, Canadian-British actor (Coronation Street, Aliens, A Bridge Too Far).

=== 20 ===
- Simone Beck, 87, French cookbook writer.
- Walter Chiari, 67, Italian actor, heart attack.
- John Brian Harley, 59, English cartographer.
- Lal Chand Yamla Jatt, 77, Indian folk singer.
- Waldemar Kazanecki, 62, Polish musician.
- Maynard C. Krueger, 85, American socialist politician and academic.
- Samuel Rabin, 80, English artist and Olympic wrestler (1928).
- Albert Van Vlierberghe, 49, Belgian cyclist and Olympian (1964).
- Gaston Waringhien, 90, French linguist.
- Don Williams, 56, American baseball player (Minnesota Twins).

=== 21 ===
- José Miguel Barandiarán, 101, Spanish anthropologist, ethnographer, and catholic priest.
- Minna Citron, 95, American painter and printmaker.
- Alvin Robert Cornelius, 88, Pakistani jurist, legal philosopher and judge.
- Colin Douglas, 79, English actor.
- Francesco Golisano, 62, Italian film actor.
- Hannes Häyrinen, 77, Finnish actor.
- Sheldon Mayer, 74, American comics artist, writer, and editor.
- Byron N. Scott, 88, American lawyer and politician, member of the United States House of Representatives (1935-1939.
- Wilhelm Straßburger, 84, German footballer.

=== 22 ===
- Franz Brunner, 78, Austrian field handball player and Olympian silver medalist (1936).
- Joe Carter, 82, American football player (Philadelphia Eagles, Green Bay Packers, Chicago Bears).
- Hal Finney, 86, American baseball player (Pittsburgh Pirates).
- James C. Fletcher, 72, American academic and NASA administrator.
- Ernesto Grassi, 89, Italian philosopher.
- Beaver Harris, 55, American jazz drummer.
- Mirza Nurul Huda, 72, Bangladesh politician and academic.
- Ernst Krenek, 91, Austrian-American composer.
- Gyula Kunszt, 88, Hungarian Olympic gymnast (1928).
- Jack Otterson, 86, American art director.
- Bruno Pellizzari, 84, Italian Olympic racing cyclist (1932).
- Hans Edmund Wolters, 76, German ornithologist.
- Édouard Woolley, 75, Haitian-Canadian tenor, actor, and composer.

=== 23 ===
- Aimé Durbec, 89, French footballer.
- José Guerrero, 77, Spanish artist.
- Göte Melin, 81, Swedish Olympic wrestler (1936).
- Gene Milford, 89, American film and television editor.
- Andrew Odom, 55, American blues musician, heart attack.
- Tom Tribe, 72, Australian rules footballer.
- Bořivoj Zeman, 79, Czech film director and screenwriter.

=== 24 ===
- Jimmy Crapnell, 88, Scottish footballer.
- El-Sayed El-Dhizui, 65, Egyptian football player and Olympian (1948, 1952).
- Ivan Duke, 78, South African Olympic boxer (1932).
- Alfons Goppel, 86, German politician and Prime Minister of Bavaria.
- Marion West Higgins, 76, American politician, traffic collision.
- Georg Höltig, 79, German Olympic equestrian (1952).
- Ghulam Rasul, 60, Pakistani educationist and field hockey Olympic champion (1956, 1960).
- Virginia Sorensen, 79, American writer.

=== 25 ===
- Curt Bois, 90, German actor.
- Anton Burger, 80, German SS officer and concentration camp commandant.
- Orane Demazis, 97, French actress.
- Frank Finnigan, 88, Canadian ice hockey player (Ottawa Senators, Toronto Maple Leafs, St. Louis Eagles).
- Wilhelm Harster, 87, German policeman, SS officer and war criminal during World War ||.
- Mahmood Hussain, 59, Pakistani cricket player, diabetes.
- Heinrich Lebensaft, 86, Austrian footballer.
- Gotlib Roninson, 75, Soviet actor.
- Wilbur Snyder, 62, American gridiron football player.
- Richard G. Stilwell, 74, United States Army general.

=== 26 ===
- Prince Gorm of Denmark, 72, Danish prince.
- Gustav Neidlinger, 81, German bass-baritone.
- Tom Neumeier, 70, Dutch rower and Olympian (1948).
- Budd Olsen, 67, American racing driver.
- Sid Wayne, 69, American songwriter, lyricist and composer.

=== 27 ===
- Cary Cox, 73, American gridiron football player.
- Hervé Guibert, 36, French writer and photographer, AIDS.
- Arne Holst, 87, Norwegian Olympic bobsledder (1948, 1952).
- Eitan Livni, 72, Israeli revisionist zionist activist and politician.
- Petro Marko, 78, Albanian writer.

=== 28 ===
- Jacques Aubuchon, 67, American actor, heart failure.
- George Espeut, 74, Jamaican Olympic weightlifter (1948).
- Cassandra Harris, 43, Australian actress (For Your Eyes Only), ovarian cancer.
- Enrique Herrera, 87, Cuban film actor.
- Cy Kasper, 96, American football player and coach.
- Osório Pereira, 86, Brazilian Olympic rower (1932).
- Leon Punch, 63, Australian politician.
- Alfred Dudley Ward, 86, British Army general.

=== 29 ===
- Dora Gordine, 96, Estonian-British sculptor.
- John Houser, 82, American Olympic rower (1936).
- Gavin Morgan, 80, Australian rules footballer.
- V. N. Reddy, 77, Indian cinematographer and director.
- Brian Reilly, 90, Irish chess master, writer and editor.
- Tony Strobl, 76, American comic artist and animator (Pinocchio).
- Alex Tremulis, 77, American automotive designer.

=== 30 ===
- Jean Grumellon, 68, French football player.
- Louis Henry, 80, French historian.
- José Miguel Marín, 46, Argentine football player and coach, heart attack.
- Michiko Nakanishi, 78, Japanese sprinter.
- Marcus Morton Rhoades, 88, American cytogeneticist.
- Piet Vermeylen, 87, Belgian lawyer and politician.

=== 31 ===
- Yuri Belov, 61, Soviet and Russian film and theatre actor.
- Felicja Blumental, 83, Polish pianist.
- Marco Antonio Serna Díaz, 55, Colombian herpetologist, ornithologist, and naturalist.
- Mary Virginia Gaver, 85, American librarian.
- Raymond R. Guest, 84, American businessman and thoroughbred race horse owner, pneumonia.
- Laurdine "Pat" Patrick, 62, American jazz musician, leukemia.
- Georges Poulet, 89, Belgian literary critic.
- Ken Robinson, 64, Canadian lawyer and politician.
- Christopher Steel, 53, British composer.
