= Sloley (surname) =

Sloley is a surname. Notable people with the surname include:

- Alex Sloley (born 1991), British disappearance victim
- Charlie Sloley (1906–1996), Australian rules footballer
- Herbert Sloley (1855–1937), British colonial policeman and administrator.
- Richard Sloley (1891–1946), British footballer

== See also ==
- Slaley (disambiguation)
