= Bill Dugan (disambiguation) =

Bill Dugan (born 1959) is an American football offensive lineman. Bill Dugan or Duggan may also refer to:

- Bill Dugan (baseball) (1864–1921), 19th-century baseball player
- Bill Dugan (rower) (1913–1996), American Olympic rower
- Bill Duggan (born 1974), American actor
- Billy Duggan (1884–1934), Australian trade unionist
