= University Sports Association of Poland =

Students sports association in Poland

Academic Sports Association
- Akademicki Związek Sportowy
- Abbreviation: AZS
- Formation: May 15, 1909; 117 years ago
- Founder: Wacław Majewski
- Founded at: Collegium Novum, Jagiellonian University, Kraków
- Type: Students' sport organization
- Region served: Poland
- Members: 50,000+ (2007)
- Website: www.azs.pl

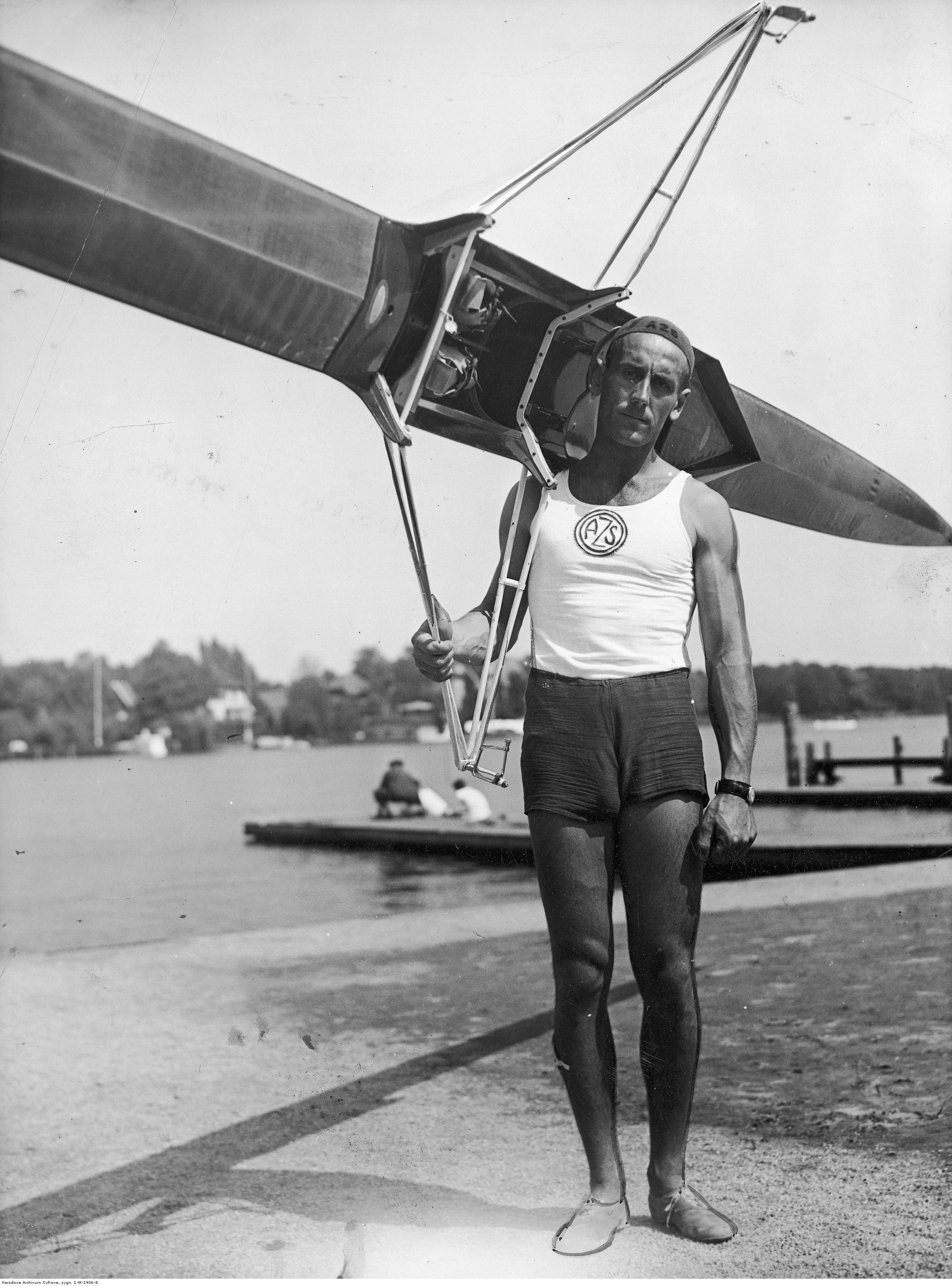
Roger Verey wearing a top with the AZS logo

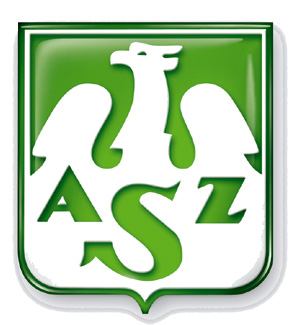
Logo of AZS

The Academic Sports Association (Polish: Akademicki Związek Sportowy, AZS) is a mass students’ sport organization, one of the biggest sports associations in Poland. Its main objectives are the development of physical education, the promotion of a healthy lifestyle and physical activities among Polish youth.

Currently, AZS has around 50,000 members, students of around 200 colleges across Poland. Students, associated with the organisation, can practice various kinds of sports as amateurs and as professionals. AZS sportspersons make up around 25% of members of Polish national teams; they are represented in all major sports events across the world, including the Olympic Games.

== History ==
=== Early days ===
The AZS was founded on 15 May 1909, during a meeting of students, which took place in the Collegium Novum of the Jagiellonian University in the Grand Duchy of Kraków. Wacław Majewski, a medical student at Jagiellonian University, became the first director of the association.

In the Second Polish Republic, the AZS quickly developed into a mass organization, present in all Polish major urban areas. Number of its branches grew, and by 1939, there were seven of them:

- from 1918 in Warsaw,
- 1919 in Poznań,
- 1921 in Wilno and Gdańsk,
- 1922 in Lwów and Lublin.

In the 1930s, the AZS had around 3,000 members, many of whom were renowned on the international stage. Among the most famous AZS sportspersons of the interbellum period were Halina Konopacka, Roger Verey, Jerzy Ustupski, Władysław Segda and Adam Papée. The most popular sports, practised by members of the organisation, were tourism, rowing, track and field, tennis, fencing and skiing. The quick growth of the organisation made it necessary to create a central office of the AZS, which would coordinate the activities of all local branches. It was created on 18–19 March 1923 in Warsaw, during a meeting of all representatives. The first director of the central office was Stefan Grodzki.

=== After World War II ===
As soon as the war was over, the AZS recreated its activities, and its main office was moved to Kraków. New branches were opened in all academic centres of Poland. In 1945, the AZS became active in colleges and universities in Katowice, Łódź, Gliwice, Wrocław and Częstochowa. More branches were opened almost every year:

- 1946 – Toruń, Szczecin,
- 1949 – Zabrze-Rokitnica,
- 1950 – Olsztyn, Białystok,
- 1955 – Opole,
- 1963 – Rzeszów,
- 1965 – Bydgoszcz,
- 1966 – Zielona Góra,
- 1968 – Koszalin,
- 1969 – Kielce, Płock, Radom, Siedlce, Słupsk,
- 1970s – Bielsko-Biała, Gorzów Wielkopolski, Cieszyn.

== Currently ==
The AZS is currently the most popular student organisation in Poland. According to its official webpage, it has 318 clubs, active at almost all Polish colleges and universities, both private and public. At each institution, there can be only one AZS organisation. As of 30 September 2007, it had more than 50,000 members. Its members have won numerous medals during the biggest sporting events in the world, including the Olympic Games. It has three sports centres – in Wilkasy, Gorki Zachodnie, and Zieleniec in Duszniki-Zdrój. It carries out activities in almost all kinds of sports.

== Clubs ==
Sports teams affiliated with AZS, historically competed in large numbers in the top Polish leagues in such sports as volleyball and basketball. As of the 2025/6 season, AZS-affiliated clubs include: AZS Olsztyn, who compete in the PlusLiga, AZS UJ Kraków in the Ekstraliga, and AZS Poznań and AZS Lublin in the Basket Liga Kobiet.

== Olympic gold medallists from AZS ==
- Waldemar Baszanowski – AZS AWF Warsaw
- Leszek Blanik – AZS Gdańsk
- Ryszard Bosek – AZS Warsaw
- Marek Dąbrowski – AZS Warsaw
- Magdalena Fularczyk – AZS WSG Bydgoszcz
- Arkadiusz Godel – AZS Lublin
- Sylwia Gruchała – AZS Gdańsk
- Otylia Jędrzejczak – AZS AWF Warsaw
- Robert Korzeniowski – AZS AWF Katowice
- Tomasz Majewski – AZS AWF Warsaw
- Beata Mikołajczyk – AZS WSG Bydgoszcz
- Zbigniew Zarzycki – AZS AWF Warsaw
- Adrian Zieliński – AZS WSG Bydgoszcz
- Szymon Ziółkowski – AZS Poznań
