= Franco Zucchi =

Franco Zucchi can refer to:

- Franco Zucchi (rower) (born 1965), Italian Olympic rower
- Franco Zucchi (sailor) (born 1917), Italian Olympic sailor
