= Rowing at the 1936 Summer Olympics – Men's single sculls =

Olympic rowing event

Men's single sculls at the Games of the XI Olympiad
- Venue: Grünau Regatta Course
- Dates: 11–14 August 1936
- Competitors: 20 from 20 nations
- Winning time: 8:21.5

Medalists
1st place, gold medalist(s)		Gustav Schäfer; Germany
2nd place, silver medalist(s)		Josef Hasenöhrl; Austria
3rd place, bronze medalist(s)		Dan Barrow; United States

The men's single sculls competition at the 1936 Summer Olympics took place at Grünau Regatta Course, near Berlin, Germany. The event was held from 11 to 14 August. There were 20 competitors from 20 nations, with each nation limited to a single boat in the event. The event was won by Gustav Schäfer of Germany, the nation's first victory in the event and first medal of any colour in the men's single sculls since 1908. Josef Hasenöhrl took silver, Austria's first medal in the event. Dan Barrow earned bronze, extending the United States' podium streak in the event to five Games; the Americans had taken a medal in each of the six times they competed in the event.

== Background ==
This was the ninth appearance of the event. Rowing had been on the programme in 1896 but was cancelled due to bad weather. The single sculls has been held every time that rowing has been contested, beginning in 1900.

None of the 5 rowers from the 1932 Games returned. Australia's Cecil Pearce was the cousin of 1928 and 1932 gold medalist Bobby Pearce, who had turned professional after the 1932 Games (and thus was no longer eligible under the amateurism rules in place at the time). The pre-race favorite was Ernst Rufli of Switzerland, the two-time reigning Diamond Challenge Sculls champion. Humphrey Warren of Great Britain, Gustav Schäfer of Germany, and Jiří Zavřel of Czechoslovakia were also significant contenders.

Argentina, Brazil, Estonia, Norway, and Yugoslavia each made their debut in the event. Great Britain made its eighth appearance, most among nations, having missed only the 1904 Games in St. Louis.

== Competition format ==
Despite having five more rowers than the previous record of 15 at the 1928 Games, the 1932 Games used only 4 rounds (to the 1928 tournament's 7). There were three main rounds and a repechage. The number of boats allowed in individual races was expanded from prior Games, with the final reaching six boats for the first time.

- Quarterfinals: There were four quarterfinal heats, each with 5 boats. The winner of each race advanced to the semifinals, while all other boats went to the repechage for a second chance. No rowers were eliminated.
- Repechage: There were again four heats, this time with 4 boats apiece. The winner of each joined the quarterfinal winners in the semifinals. The remaining 12 boats were eliminated.
- Semifinals: There were two heats, each with 4 boats (2 quarterfinal winners and 2 repechage winners apiece). The top 3 boats in each semifinal advanced to the final, with only the two 4th-place boats eliminated in this round.
- The final had 6 boats.

The course used the 2000 metres distance that became the Olympic standard in 1912.

== Schedule ==
Date	Time	Round
Tuesday, 11 August 1936	17:00	Quarterfinals
Wednesday, 12 August 1936	18:00	Repechage
Thursday, 13 August 1936	19:00	Semifinals
Friday, 14 August 1936	15:30	Final

== Results ==
=== Quarterfinals ===
The first rower in each heat advanced directly to the semifinals. The others competed again in the repechage for remaining spots in the semifinals.

==== Quarterfinal 1 ====
Rank	Rower	Nation	Time	Notes
1	Roger Verey	Poland	7:31.2	Q
2	Celestino de Palma	Brazil	7:37.7	R
3	Elmar Korko	Estonia	7:40.4	R
4	Hans ten Houten	Netherlands	7:42.9	R
5	Davor Jelaska	Yugoslavia	8:05.2	R

==== Quarterfinal 2 ====
Rank	Rower	Nation	Time	Notes
1	Gustav Schäfer	Germany	7:17.1	Q
2	Josef Hasenöhrl	Austria	7:24.0	R
3	Charles Campbell	Canada	7:25.7	R
4	Cecil Pearce	Australia	7:27.0	R
5	Dan Barrow	United States	7:30.5	R

==== Quarterfinal 3 ====
Rank	Rower	Nation	Time	Notes
1	Ernst Rufli	Switzerland	7:19.0	Q
2	Henri Banos	France	7:39.9	R
3	Carl Christiansen	Norway	7:42.9	R
4	László Kozma	Hungary	7:47.0	R
5	Walter Youell	South Africa	7:56.6	R

==== Quarterfinal 4 ====
Rank	Rower	Nation	Time	Notes
1	Humphrey Warren	Great Britain	7:27.0	Q
2	Riccardo Steinleitner	Italy	7:30.6	R
3	Antonio Giorgio	Argentina	7:33.0	R
4	Arquímedes Juanicó	Uruguay	7:39.6	R
5	Jiří Zavřel	Czechoslovakia	7:43.0	R

=== Repechage ===
The winner of each race advanced to the semifinals; the other rowers were eliminated.

==== Repechage heat 1 ====
Rank	Rower	Nation	Time	Notes
1	Josef Hasenöhrl	Austria	7:27.7	Q
2	Carl Christiansen	Norway	7:32.8	
3	Elmar Korko	Estonia	7:44.1	
4	László Kozma	Hungary	7:45.9	

==== Repechage heat 2 ====
Rank	Rower	Nation	Time	Notes
1	Dan Barrow	United States	7:31.3	Q
2	Riccardo Steinleitner	Italy	7:31.4	
3	Hans ten Houten	Netherlands	7:48.6	
4	Walter Youell	South Africa	8:04.7	

==== Repechage heat 3 ====
Rank	Rower	Nation	Time	Notes
1	Antonio Giorgio	Argentina	7:38.7	Q
2	Jiří Zavřel	Czechoslovakia	7:45.4	
3	Henri Banos	France	7:49.0	
4	Davor Jelaska	Yugoslavia	DNF	

==== Repechage 4 ====
Rank	Rower	Nation	Time	Notes
1	Charles Campbell	Canada	7:31.0	Q
2	Cecil Pearce	Australia	7:33.2	
3	Celestino de Palma	Brazil	7:49.7	
4	Arquímedes Juanicó	Uruguay	7:52.4	

=== Semifinals ===
The first three rowers in each heat advanced to the final.

==== Semifinal 1 ====
Rank	Rower	Nation	Time	Notes
1	Gustav Schäfer	Germany	8:04.0	Q
2	Dan Barrow	United States	8:17.9	Q
3	Antonio Giorgio	Argentina	8:18.4	Q
4	Roger Verey	Poland	DNF	

==== Semifinal 2 ====
Rank	Rower	Nation	Time	Notes
1	Ernst Rufli	Switzerland	7:46.9	Q
2	Josef Hasenöhrl	Austria	7:54.6	Q
3	Charles Campbell	Canada	8:02.2	Q
4	Humphrey Warren	Great Britain	8:08.8	

=== Final ===
Rank	Rower	Nation	Time
1st place, gold medalist(s)	Gustav Schäfer	Germany	8:21.5
2nd place, silver medalist(s)	Josef Hasenöhrl	Austria	8:25.8
3rd place, bronze medalist(s)	Dan Barrow	United States	8:28.0
4	Charles Campbell	Canada	8:35.0
5	Ernst Rufli	Switzerland	8:38.9
6	Antonio Giorgio	Argentina	8:57.5

== Results summary ==
Rank	Rower	Nation	Quarterfinals	Repechage	Semifinals	Final
1st place, gold medalist(s)	Gustav Schäfer	Germany	7:17.1	Bye	8:04.0	8:21.5
2nd place, silver medalist(s)	Josef Hasenöhrl	Austria	7:24.0	7:27.7	7:54.6	8:25.8
3rd place, bronze medalist(s)	Dan Barrow	United States	7:30.5	7:31.3	8:17.9	8:28.0
4	Charles Campbell	Canada	7:25.7	7:31.0	8:02.2	8:35.0
5	Ernst Rufli	Switzerland	7:19.0	Bye	7:46.9	8:38.9
6	Antonio Giorgio	Argentina	7:33.0	7:38.7	8:18.4	8:57.5
7	Humphrey Warren	Great Britain	7:27.0	Bye	8:08.8	Did not advance
8	Roger Verey	Poland	7:31.2	Bye	DNF	Did not advance
9	Riccardo Steinleitner	Italy	7:30.6	7:31.4	Did not advance	
10	Carl Christiansen	Norway	7:42.9	7:32.8	Did not advance	
11	Cecil Pearce	Australia	7:27.0	7:33.2	Did not advance	
12	Elmar Korko	Estonia	7:40.4	7:44.1	Did not advance	
13	Jiří Zavřel	Czechoslovakia	7:43.0	7:45.4	Did not advance	
14	László Kozma	Hungary	7:47.0	7:45.9	Did not advance	
15	Hans ten Houten	Netherlands	7:42.9	7:48.6	Did not advance	
16	Henri Banos	France	7:39.9	7:49.0	Did not advance	
17	Celestino de Palma	Brazil	7:37.7	7:49.7	Did not advance	
18	Arquímedes Juanicó	Uruguay	7:39.6	7:52.4	Did not advance	
19	Walter Youell	South Africa	7:56.6	8:04.7	Did not advance	
20	Davor Jelaska	Yugoslavia	8:05.2	DNF	Did not advance	
