= AZS =

AZS may refer to:

- Samaná El Catey International Airport
- Arizona Southern Railroad
- Akademickiego Związku Sportowego, the Academic Sports Association in Poland
