= Studach =

Studach is a surname. Notable people with the surname include:

- Eugen Studach (1907–1995), Swiss rower
- Martin Studach (1944–2007), Swiss rower
