= Gustav Schäfer =

Gustav Schäfer may refer to:

- Gustav Schäfer (rower) (1906–1991), German Olympic rower
- Gustav Schäfer (drummer) (born 1988), drummer of Tokio Hotel
