= Rapuano =

Rapuano is an Italian surname. Notable people with the surname include:

- Ed Rapuano (born 1957), American baseball umpire
- Kenneth Rapuano, American Marine
- Paschoal Rapuano (1910–2003), Brazilian rower
