= John Sutherland (author) =

British journalist, literary critic and writer (born 1938)

John Sutherland FRSL
- Born: John Andrew Sutherland; 9 October 1938 (age 88); London, England
- Education: University of Leicester; University of Edinburgh
- Occupations: Writer, academic
- Writing career
- Genre: literary criticism

John Andrew Sutherland (born 9 October 1938) is a British academic, newspaper columnist and author. He is Emeritus Lord Northcliffe Professor of Modern English Literature at University College London.

== Biography ==
After graduating from the University of Leicester in 1964, Sutherland gained a PhD from the University of Edinburgh, where he began his academic career as an assistant lecturer. He specialises in Victorian fiction, 20th-century literature, and the history of publishing. Among his works of scholarship is the Longman Companion to Victorian Fiction (known in the US as Stanford Companion, 1989), a comprehensive encyclopaedia of Victorian fiction. A second edition was published in 2009 with 900 biographical entries, synopses of over 600 novels, and extensive background material on publishers, reviewers, and readers.

Apart from writing regularly for The Guardian newspaper, Sutherland has published a number of books of literary scholarship and is editing the forthcoming Oxford Companion to Popular Fiction. The series of books, which starts with Is Heathcliff a Murderer?, has brought him a wide readership. The books in the series are collections of essays about classic fiction from the Victorian period. Carefully going over the text, Sutherland highlights apparent inconsistencies, anachronisms and oversights, and explains references that the modern reader is likely to overlook. In some cases, he demonstrates the likelihood that the author simply forgot a minor detail. In others, apparent slips on the part of the author are presented as evidence that something is going on below the surface of the book that is not explicitly described (such as his explanation for why Sherlock Holmes should mis-address Miss Stoner as Miss Roylott in "The Adventure of the Speckled Band").

Sutherland was elected a Fellow of the Royal Society of Literature in 1990.

In 2001, he published Last Drink to LA, a chronicle of his alcoholism, drug addiction, and return to sobriety. In 2004, he published a biography of Stephen Spender. In 2005, he was involved in Dot Mobile's project to translate summaries and quotes of classic literature into text messaging shorthand. In the same year, he was also Chair of Judges for the Man Booker Prize, despite having caused some controversy in 1999 when he revealed details of disagreements between his fellow judges in his Guardian column. In 2007, he published an autobiography, The Boy Who Loved Books. The same year, his annotated edition of Robert Louis Stevenson's The Black Arrow was released by Penguin Books. In 2011, he published Lives of the Novelists: A History of Fiction in 294 Lives, an 800-page book containing 294 idiosyncratic sketches of famous and lesser-known novelists selected from the past 400 years.

He has also provided the forewords and introductions to a number of titles in the Oxford World's Classics series; for authors such as William Makepeace Thackeray, Anthony Trollope and Wilkie Collins. Similarly for various titles published by Penguin Classics, the Folio Society and others. A number of his earlier books have the author as "J. Sutherland" or "J. A. Sutherland", and should not be confused with the scholar James R. Sutherland who was also a Lord Northcliffe Professor.

== Partial bibliography ==
- Thackeray at Work, Athlone Press, 1974, ISBN 978-0485111460
- Victorian Novelists and Publishers, Athlone Press, 1976, ISBN 978-0485111613
- Fiction and the Fiction Industry, Athlone Press, 1978, ISBN 978-0485111774
- Bestsellers: Popular Fiction of the 1970's, Routledge & Kegan Paul, 1981, ISBN 978-0710007506
- Offensive Literature: Decensorship in Britain 1960-1982, Junction Books, 1982, ISBN 978-0862450656
- The Longman Companion to Victorian Fiction, Longman, 1988; or (US edition) The Stanford Companion to Victorian Fiction, Stanford University Press, 1989 (revised edition, 2009), ISBN 978-1408203903
- Mrs Humphry Ward: Eminent Victorian, Pre-Eminent Edwardian, Oxford University Press, 1990, ISBN 978-0198185871 online copy
- Victorian Fiction: Writers, Publishers, Readers, Palgrave Macmillan, 1995, ISBN 978-0333632864
- The Life of Walter Scott. A Critical Biography, Wiley-Blackwell, 1995, ISBN 978-1557862310
- The Oxford Book of English Love Stories, Oxford University Press, 1996, ISBN 978-0192142375 (editor)
- Is Heathcliff a Murderer? Puzzles in Nineteenth-century Fiction, Oxford University Press, 1996, ISBN 0-19-282516-X
- Can Jane Eyre Be Happy? More Puzzles in Classic Fiction, Oxford University Press, 1997, ISBN 0-19-283309-X
- Where Was Rebecca Shot? Puzzles, Curiosities and Conundrums in Modern Fiction, Weidenfeld & Nicolson, 1998, ISBN 978-0297841463
- Who Betrays Elizabeth Bennet? Further Puzzles in Classic Fiction, Oxford University Press, 1999
- Henry V, War Criminal? & Other Shakespeare Puzzles, (w/ Cedric Watts), Oxford University Press, 2000, ISBN 0-19-283879-2
- The Literary Detective: 100 Puzzles in Classic Fiction, Oxford University Press, 2000, ISBN 978-0192100368 (omnibus edition)
- Last Drink to LA, Faber and Faber, 2001, ISBN 978-0-571-20855-5
- Literary Lives: Intimate Biographies of the Famous by the Famous, Oxford University Press, 2001, ISBN 978-0198604068 (editor)
- Reading the Decades: Fifty Years of British History Through the Nation's Bestsellers, BBC Books, 2002, ISBN 978-0563488101
- Stephen Spender: The Authorized Biography, Viking, 2004, ISBN 978-0670883035
- How to Read a Novel: A User's Guide, Profile, 2006, ISBN 978-1861979469
- The Boy Who Loved Books: A Memoir, John Murray, 2007, ISBN 978-0-7195-6431-4
- Bestsellers: A Very Short Introduction, Oxford University Press, 2007, ISBN 978-0199214891
- Curiosities of Literature: A Book-lover's Anthology of Literary Erudition, Random House, 2008, ISBN 9781905211975
- So You Think You Know Jane Austen? A Literary Quizbook, Oxford University Press, 2009, ISBN 978-0199538997 (with Deirdre Le Faye)
- 50 Literature Ideas You Really Need to Know, Quercus, 2010, ISBN 978-1848660601; or (US edition) How Literature Works: 50 Key Concepts, Oxford University Press, 2011, ISBN 978-0199794201
- Love, Sex, Death and Words: Surprising Tales from a Year in Literature, Icon Books, 2010, ISBN 978-1848311640 (with Stephen Fender)
- Lives of the Novelists: A History of Fiction in 294 Lives, Profile Books, 2011, ISBN 978-1846681578
- Stephen Spender: New Selected Journals, 1939-1995, Faber & Faber, 2012, ISBN 978-0571237579 (editor with Lara Feigel)
- The Connell Guide to F. Scott Fitzgerald's Great Gatsby, Connell Publishing, 2012, ISBN 978-1907776014 (with Jolyon Connell)
- The Connell Guide to Charles Dickens's Great Expectations, Connell Publishing, 2012, ISBN 978-1907776038 (with Jolyon Connell)
- The Connell Guide to Jane Austen's Emma, Connell Publishing, 2012, ISBN 978-1907776137 (with Jolyon Connell)
- The Dickens Dictionary: An A-Z of Britain's Greatest Novelist, Icon Books, 2012, ISBN 978-1848313910
- A Little History of Literature, Yale University Press, 2013, ISBN 978-0300186857
- The Connell Guide to Virginia Woolf's Mrs Dalloway, Connell Publishing, 2014, ISBN 978-1907776267 (with Susanna Hislop)
- How to be Well Read: A Guide to 500 Great Novels and a Handful of Literary Curiosities, Random House Books, 2014, ISBN 978-1847946409
- Jumbo: The Unauthorised Biography of a Victorian Sensation, Aurum Press, 2014, ISBN 978-1781312445
- How Good is Your Grammar?, Short Books, 2015, ISBN 978-1780722573
- The War on the Old, Biteback, 2016, ISBN 978-1785901713
- Orwell's Nose: A Pathological Biography, Reaktion Books, 2016, ISBN 978-1780236483
- The Good Brexiteer's Guide to English Lit, Reaktion Books, 2018, ISBN 978-1780239927
- The War on the Young, Biteback, 2018, ISBN 978-1785903397
- The Connell Guide to Jane Austen's Mansfield Park, Connell Publishing, 2018, ISBN 978-1907776304 (with Jolyon Connell)
- Literary Landscapes: Charting the Worlds of Classical Literature, Black Dog & Leventhal, 2018, ISBN 978-0316561822 (General editor)
- Rogue Publisher, 'The Prince of Puffers': The Life and Works of the Publisher Henry Colburn, EER, 2018, ISBN 978-1911204558
- The Secret Trollope: Anthony Trollope Uncovered, EER, 2019, ISBN 978-1912224456
- Monica Jones, Philip Larkin and Me: Her Life and Long Loves, Weidenfeld & Nicolson, 2021, ISBN 978-1474620185
- Triggered Literature: Cancellation, Stealth Censorship and Cultural Warfare, Biteback, 2023, ISBN 978-1785908170
