= Davor Jelaska =

Croatian rower (1907–1995)

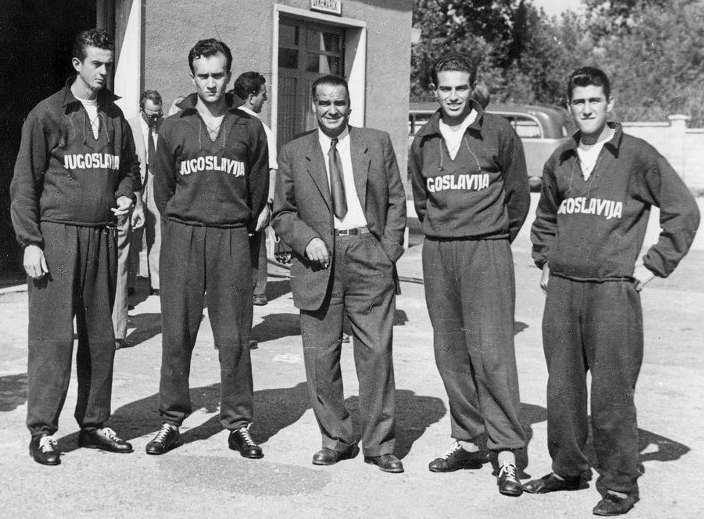
- Davor Jelaska (middle) in 1952

Personal information
- Nationality: Croatian
- Born: 25 November 1907; Split, Austria-Hungary
- Died: 5 December 1995 (aged 88); Split, Croatia

Sport
- Sport: Rowing

Davor Jelaska (25 November 1907 – 5 December 1995) was a Croatian rower. He competed in the men's single sculls event at the 1936 Summer Olympics. He was a coach of golden Men's Coxless Four in Helsinki.
