= Hans ten Houten =

Dutch rower

Personal information
- Nationality: Dutch
- Born: 14 April 1916; Watergraafsmeer, Netherlands
- Died: 10 December 1988 (aged 72); Eemnes, Netherlands

Sport
- Sport: Rowing

Hans ten Houten (14 April 1916 – 10 December 1988) was a Dutch rower. He competed in the men's single sculls event at the 1936 Summer Olympics.
