= Károly Bazini =

Hungarian rower (1910–1973)

Personal information
- Nationality: Hungarian
- Born: 18 February 1910; Budapest, Austria-Hungary
- Died: 1 March 1973 (aged 63); Budapest, Hungary

Sport
- Sport: Rowing

Károly Bazini (18 February 1910 – 1 March 1973) was a Hungarian rower. He competed in the men's double sculls event at the 1936 Summer Olympics.
