= Dick Southwood =

English rower

Olympic medal record

Men's rowing

Representing Great Britain
| Gold medal – first place | 1936 Berlin | double sculls |

Leslie Frank "Dick" Southwood (18 January 1906 – 7 February 1986) was an English rower who competed in the 1932 Summer Olympics and in the 1936 Summer Olympics representing Great Britain.

Southwood was born in Fulham and was educated at Latymer Upper School. He initially joined Auriol Rowing Club but Jack Beresford spotted his sculling potential and persuaded him to join Thames Rowing Club. He competed unsuccessfully in the Wingfield Sculls in 1931. In 1932 he competed in the single sculls rowing for Great Britain at the 1932 Summer Olympics but in the final suffered an attack of cramp in the shoulder and finished fourth. He won the Wingfield Sculls in 1933, beating the holder Denis Guye.

In 1936 Southwood partnered Jack Beresford in the double sculls for Great Britain rowing at the 1936 Summer Olympics in Berlin. With Adolf Hitler watching, Beresford and Southwood came from a length down to pass the Germans with 200 metres to go and won the gold medal. Beresford thus won his fifth Olympic medal and wrote later that it was "the sweetest race I ever rowed."

Beresford and Southwood paired up again in 1939 in the centenary double sculls at Henley Royal Regatta. They dead-heated with Scherli and Broschi of Trieste, who were the reigning European champions.

Southwood died in Little Wittenham, Oxfordshire at the age of 80.
