= Robert Jacquet =

French rower

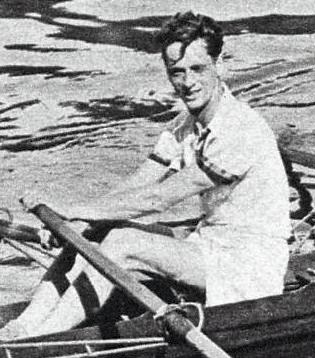

Personal information
- Born: 6 April 1906
- Died: 7 September 1970 (aged 64)

Sport
- Sport: Rowing
- Club: Rowing-Club Paris
Medal record
Men's rowing
Representing France
European Rowing Championships
Bronze medal – third place	1935 Berlin	Double sculls

Robert Jacquet (6 April 1906 – 7 September 1970) was a French rower. He competed at the 1936 Summer Olympics in Berlin with the men's double sculls where they came fourth.
