= László Kozma (rower) =

Hungarian rower

Personal information
- Nationality: Hungarian
- Born: 1 May 1903

Sport
- Sport: Rowing

László Kozma (born 1 May 1903, date of death unknown) was a Hungarian rower. He competed in the men's single sculls event at the 1936 Summer Olympics.
