= Herb Turner (rower) =

Australian rower

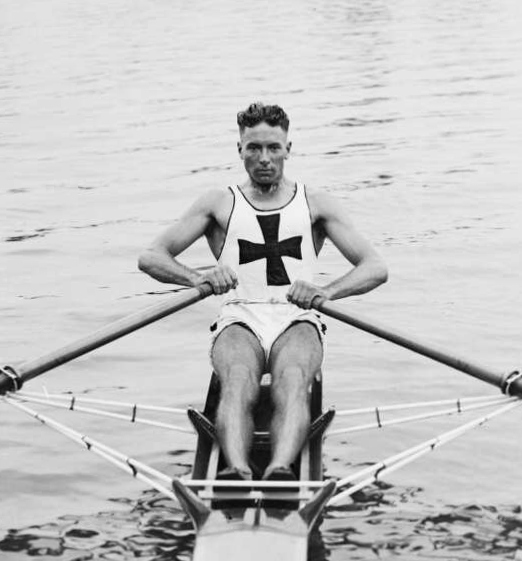
- Turner in 1935

Personal information
- Full name: Herbert James Turner
- Born: 6 August 1910
- Died: 5 May 1998 (aged 87) Croydon, New South Wales, Australia

Sport
- Sport: Rowing
- Club: Sydney Rowing Club

Achievements and titles
- Olympic finals: 1936 Berlin Olympics M2X
Medal record
Representing Australia
British Empire Games
| Gold medal – first place | 1938 Sydney | Single sculls |

Herbert James Turner (6 August 1910 – 5 May 1998) was an Australian representative rower. He was a four-time single sculls national champion who won the single sculls event at the 1938 British Empire Games. He competed in the double sculls at the 1936 Olympics, together with Bill Dixon, and finished sixth.

== State and club rowing ==
Turner's senior rowing was from Sydney Rowing Club. He was first selected as the New South Wales state entrant to contest the President's Cup - the interstate single sculls championship - at the 1932 Interstate Regatta. He won that title in 1932 and then won the event in 1933, 1934 (with a winning margin of 15 lengths) and 1935 (by 48 secs).

== International representative rowing ==
Although he was the 1935 Australian single-sculls champion, Turner was beaten in selection trials for the 1936 Summer Olympics by Cecil Pearce. Pearce was chosen as the single sculler and Turner was selected to row the double scull with Pearce. The rowing selectors also nominated Pearce and Turner in a double scull. However the AOF selection committee preferred to see Pearce focus on the single and Turner rowed the double with the Bill Dixon the reserve for the men's eight. Though Dixon had not sculled before selection, he and Turner were the best performers of the three Australian boats in Berlin. They made the Olympic final and placed sixth.

In 1938 Turner was Australia's single sculls entrant for the 1938 Commonwealth Games where he won the gold medal beating the British sculler Peter H. Jackson by five lengths in the final.
