= Walter Youell =

South African rower

Personal information
- Nationality: South African
- Born: 27 December 1909; Vereeniging, South Africa
- Died: 23 January 1994 (aged 84); Parys, South Africa

Sport
- Sport: Rowing

Walter Youell (27 December 1909 – 23 January 1994) was a South African rower. He competed in the men's single sculls event at the 1936 Summer Olympics.
