= Egon Bazini =

Hungarian rower

Personal information
- Nationality: Hungarian
- Born: 7 September 1911; Budapest, Austria-Hungary
- Died: 5 March 1998 (aged 86); Budapest, Hungary

Sport
- Sport: Rowing

Egon Bazini (7 September 1911 – 5 March 1998) was a Hungarian rower. He competed in the men's double sculls event at the 1936 Summer Olympics.
