= Antonio Giorgio =

Argentine rower

Personal information
- Nationality: Argentine
- Born: 29 October 1897
- Died: 27 July 1988 (aged 90)

Sport
- Sport: Rowing

Antonio Giorgio (29 October 1897 – 27 June 1988) was an Argentine rower. He competed in the men's single sculls event at the 1936 Summer Olympics.
