= Zita Kabátová =

Czech actress (1913–2012)

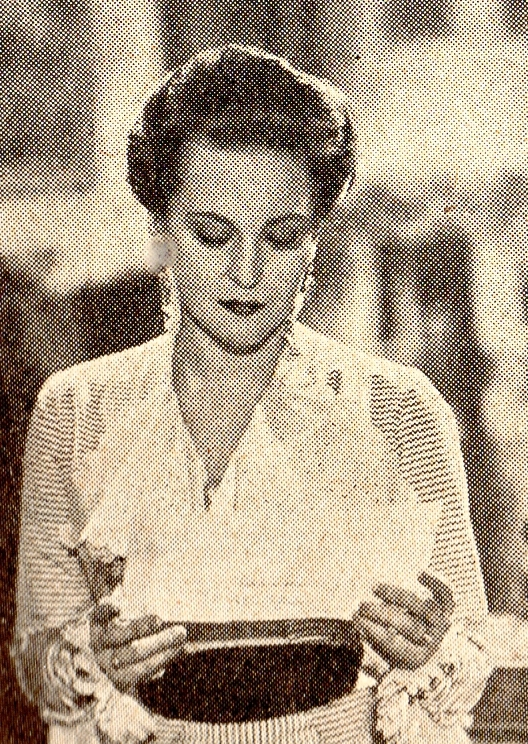
- Kabátová in 1942
- Born: 27 April 1913; Prague, Bohemia, Austria-Hungary
- Died: 27 May 2012 (aged 99); Prague, Czech Republic
- Other names: Zita Králová, Zita Zavřelová (married names)
- Occupation: Actress
- Spouse(s): Jerry Král (1946–1948), Jiří Zavřel (1956–1987)

Zita Kabátová (27 April 1913 – 27 May 2012) was a Czech actress.

== Life and career ==
Kabátová was born on 27 April 1913 in Prague, where her father, Benno Kabát, an architect, also acted in plays and wrote pieces for puppet theatres. Her uncle, Josef Šváb-Malostranský, was a well-known Prague cabaret artist and film actor. During World War II, she also played in the German films "Glück unterwegs" and "Schicksal am Strom". She wed athlete Jiří Zavřel, who represented Czechoslovakia at the Olympic Games. At the age of 44, she gave birth to their son Jiří, who now lives in the United States.

Kabátová lived in an assisted-living facility in Motol from 2005 until her death in 2012. At the time of her death, she was the oldest living Czech film actress and the only one alive to have performed before World War II. She took her first role in 1936 and thereafter was featured in over 60 movies. In addition to her film work, she appeared on stage, most notably at the Oldřich Nový Theatre (aka The New Theatre), and wrote and appeared in a book based on her life.

She is buried at the Vyšehrad Cemetery in Prague.

== Selected filmography ==
- Delightful Story (1936)
- Lojzička (1936)
- Paradise Road (1936)
- Vzdušné torpédo 48 (1937)
- A Foolish Girl (1938)
- Arthur and Leontine (1940)
- Station Master (1941)
- The Respectable Ladies of Pardubice (1944)
- Svět otevřený náhodám (1971)
- Ball Lightning (1979)
- Autumn Spring (2001)
