= Riccardo Steinleitner =

Italian rower

Personal information
- Nationality: Italian
- Born: 10 January 1915; Turin, Italy
- Died: 19 May 1998 (aged 83)

Sport
- Sport: Rowing

Riccardo Steinleitner (10 January 1915 – 19 May 1998) was an Italian rower. He competed in the men's single sculls event at the 1936 Summer Olympics.
