= Lásky Kačenky Strnadové =

1926 film

Lásky Kačenky Strnadové is a Czech silent comedy film. It was released in 1926.
