= Vid Fašaić =

Croatian rower

Personal information
- Nationality: Croatian
- Born: 6 June 1911
- Died: 11 April 2003 (aged 91); Velika Gorica, Croatia

Sport
- Sport: Rowing

Vid Fašaić (6 June 1911 – 11 April 2003) was a Croatian rower. He competed in the men's double sculls event at the 1936 Summer Olympics.
