= Jiří Zavřel =

Czechoslovak rower (1910–1987)

Personal information
- Born: 2 October 1910 Hrobce, Bohemia, Austria-Hungary
- Died: 8 September 1987 (aged 76) San Diego, California, United States
- Spouse: Zita Kabátová

Sport
- Sport: Rowing
Medal record
Men's rowing
Representing Czechoslovakia
European Rowing Championships
Bronze medal – third place	1932 Belgrade	Single sculls

Jiří Zavřel (2 October 1910 – 8 September 1987) was a Czech rower. He competed for Czechoslovakia at the 1936 Summer Olympics in Berlin with the men's single sculls where he was eliminated in the round one repêchage.

On 3 May 1947, he was sentenced to 12 years in prison for wartime espionage for Germany.

In 1956, he married the actress Zita Kabátová; she was the niece of the actor and writer Josef Šváb-Malostranský. They had a child the following year who they named Jiří.
