= Carl Christiansen (rower) =

Norwegian rower

Personal information
- Nationality: Norwegian
- Born: 19 January 1909; Oslo, Norway
- Died: 1 July 1990 (aged 81); Oslo, Norway

Sport
- Sport: Rowing

Carl Christiansen (19 January 1909 – 1 July 1990) was a Norwegian rower. He competed in the men's single sculls event at the 1936 Summer Olympics.
