= Elmar Korko =

Estonian rower (1908–1941)

Personal information
- Nationality: Estonian
- Born: 8 February 1908 Tartu, Estonia
- Died: 10 July 1941 (aged 33) Tartu, Estonia

Sport
- Sport: Rowing

Elmar Korko (8 February 1908 – 10 July 1941) was an Estonian bandy player and rower. He competed in the men's single sculls event at the 1936 Summer Olympics. He was executed by Soviet soldiers during World War II.
