= Guy Newton =

British rower and biochemist

- Born: 1919
- Died: 1969 (aged 49–50)
- Known for: Cephalosporin C
- Scientific career
- Fields: biochemistry

Guy Geoffrey Frederick Newton (1919–1969) was a British rower and biochemist. He was the co-discoverer of cephalosporin C.

Newton was born in St. Ives, Cambridgeshire, the son of Bernard Newton a gentleman farmer of Fairfield Bury, St Ives and his wife Antoinette Gerard. He was educated at Oundle School and Trinity Hall, Cambridge. He rowed at Cambridge and in 1949 was runner up in the Double Sculls Challenge Cup at Henley Royal Regatta, partnering Humphrey Warren.

Newton was described as "an outstanding young organic chemist with a passion for Aston Martin cars". During the 1950s at the Sir William Dunn School of Pathology, Newton and Edward Abraham discovered, purified and established the structure of cephalosporin C, the first of the cephalosporin family of antibiotics. This compound and the ring structure on which it was based were patented, and both Newton and Abraham set up trusts out of the royalties that they received. The Guy Newton Research Fund and the other trusts are dedicated to the support of medical, biological and chemical research in the Dunn School, Lincoln College and the University of Oxford.
