= Celestino de Palma =

Brazilian rower

Personal information
- Full name: Celestino João de Palma
- Born: 21 December 1912; São Paulo, Brazil

Sport
- Sport: Rowing

Celestino de Palma (born 21 December 1912, date of death unknown) was a Brazilian rower. He competed in the men's single sculls event at the 1936 Summer Olympics.
