= Willi Kaidel =

German rower (1912–1978)

Personal information
- Born: Wilhelm Kaidel; 20 April 1912 Schweinfurt
- Died: 2 April 1978 (aged 65) Schweinfurt

Sport
- Sport: Rowing
- Club: Schweinfurter Ruder-Club Franken von 1882; Skuller-Zelle, Berlin
Medal record
Men's rowing
Representing Nazi Germany
Olympic Games
Silver medal – second place	1936 Berlin	Double sculls
European Rowing Championships
Gold medal – first place	1937 Amsterdam	Double sculls

Wilhelm Kaidel (20 April 1912 – 2 April 1978), also known under his nickname Bubi, was a German rower who competed in the 1936 Summer Olympics.

Kaidel was born in Schweinfurt in 1912. He won the silver medal with his partner, Joachim Pirsch, in the 1936 Olympic double sculls competition. His son, Siegfried Kaidel, has since 2008 been the president of the German rowing association.
