= Kurt Haas =

Swiss rower

Personal information
- Nationality: Swiss
- Born: 19 January 1909
- Died: 23 September 1992 (aged 83)

Sport
- Sport: Rowing

Kurt Haas (19 January 1909 – 23 September 1992) was a Swiss rower. He competed in the men's double sculls event at the 1936 Summer Olympics.
