= Edward Abraham =

English biochemist (1913–1999)

Sir Edward Abraham CBE FRS
- Abraham at the Dunn School of Pathology, Oxford in 1939
- Born: Edward Penley Abraham; 10 June 1913; Shirley, Southampton, England
- Died: 8 May 1999 (aged 85); Oxford
- Education: The Queen's College, Oxford
- Spouse: Asbjörg Abraham (née Harung)
- Awards: CBE (1973); Royal Medal (1973); Knight Bachelor (1980)
- Scientific career
- Workplaces: University of Oxford
- Thesis: Some substituted peptides and Experiments with lysozyme (1938)
- Doctoral advisor: Sir Robert Robinson
- Doctoral students: Sir John Walker

Sir Edward Penley Abraham, CBE, FRS (10 June 1913 – 8 May 1999) was an English biochemist instrumental in the development of the first antibiotics penicillin and cephalosporin.

== Early life and education ==
Abraham was born on 10 June 1913 at 47 South View Road, Shirley, Southampton. From 1924 Abraham attended King Edward VI School, Southampton, before achieving a First in Chemistry at The Queen's College, Oxford.

Abraham completed his DPhil at the University of Oxford under the supervision of Sir Robert Robinson, during which he was the first to crystallise lysozyme, an enzyme discovered by Sir Alexander Fleming and shown to have antibacterial properties, and was later the first enzyme to have its structure solved using X-ray crystallography, by Lord David Phillips.

== Research ==
In 1938 Abraham won a Rockefeller Foundation travel fellowship and spent a year in Stockholm at the Biokemiska Institut.

He then moved back to Oxford and became part of a research team led by Sir Howard Florey at the Sir William Dunn School of Pathology, responsible for the development of penicillin and its medical applications. Abraham was specifically involved in the purification process and determination of its chemical structure. In 1940 Abraham discovered penicillinase as the cause of bacterial resistance to antibiotics such as penicillin. In October 1943 Abraham and Sir Ernst Boris Chain proposed a novel beta-lactam structure with a fused two ring system. This proposal was confirmed in 1945 by Dorothy Hodgkin using X-ray crystallography. Florey formally recognised Abraham's work in 1948 by nominating him to be one of the first three "penicillin" research Fellows at Lincoln College, Oxford.

Later that year samples of a Cephalosporium acremonium fungus with antibacterial properties were received from Giuseppe Brotzu. Abraham and Guy Newton purified the antibiotics from this fungus and found one, cephalosporin C, was not degraded by penicillinase and hence able to cure infections from penicillin-resistant bacteria. During a skiing holiday in 1958 Abraham conceived the structure of cephalosporin C, which he then went on to establish with Newton, and was confirmed by Dorothy Hodgkin through X-ray crystallography. Abraham showed that modification of the 7-amino-cephalosporanic acid nucleus was able to increase the potency of this antibiotic and registered a patent on the compound. This resulted in the first commercially sold cephalosporin antibiotic Cefalotin sold by Eli Lilly and Company. There are now five generations of cephalosporins, of which some are among the few remaining antibiotics for the treatment of MRSA.

In 1964 he became Professor of Chemical Pathology, and remained a Fellow of Lincoln until his retirement in 1980.

== Personal life ==
Abraham was born at 47 South View Road, Shirley, Southampton. His parents were Maria Agnes Abraham, née Hearne and Albert Penley Abraham, a customs and excise officer.

In 1938 he met Asbjörg Harung from Norway whom he married in Bergen the following year: she remained in Norway, trapped by the German invasion, before escaping to Sweden in 1942 when she was reunited with her husband. They had a son Michael Erling Penley Abraham, born in Oxford in July 1943.

Edward Abraham died in May 1999, in Oxford, following a stroke. He was survived by his wife, Asbjörg.

Sir Edward and Lady Abraham lived at Badgers Wood, Bedwells Heath, Boars Hill, where part of the land, Abraham Wood is now managed by the Oxford Preservation Trust.

== Legacy ==
He was a noted biochemist, his work on antibiotics producing great clinical advances. His principal work was concerned with the development of penicillin, and also later cephalosporin, an antibiotic capable of destroying penicillin-resistant bacteria. These vital drugs are now used extensively in the treatment of various infections, including pneumonia, bronchitis, septicaemia and infected surgical wounds.

Through the registration of the patent on cephalosporin, he was able to generate a regular income, which he devoted almost entirely to the establishment of two charitable trusts for the support of biomedical research, the Edward Penley Abraham Research Fund, the E.P.A. Cephalosporin Fund and The Guy Newton Research Fund. As of 2016 the combined endowment of these charities is over £194 million. By the end of the twentieth century, the charitable funds had donated more than £30m to the University of Oxford, mainly to the Dunn School of Pathology and to Lincoln College, along with other grants to The Royal Society and King Edward VI School, Southampton. Four recent Oxford buildings received funds from Abraham's trusts:

- the EP Abraham research building (completed in 2001, on South Parks Road)
- Lincoln College's EPA Science Centre (an accommodation and conferencing complex, including Lady Abraham House, completed in 2005, on Museum Road),
- Linacre College's Edward & Asbjörg Abraham Building (completed in 1995)
- The Oxford Molecular Pathology Institute, completed in 2011, is also largely funded by proceeds from Abrahams patents.

Funding from these trusts have also helped to establish two scholarship programmes for doctoral students at the University of Oxford (the Oxford-E P Abraham Research Fund Graduate Scholarship and the Oxford-EPA Cephalosporin Graduate Scholarship).

Abraham Wood is a bluebell wood at Boars Hill donated to the Oxford Preservation Trust in memory of Sir Edward and Lady Abraham.

== Awards ==
Abraham was the recipient of many awards over his lifetime:

- Fellow of the Royal Society in 1958
- CBE in the 1973 New Year Honours
- Royal Medal of the Royal Society (1973)
- Knight Bachelor in the 1980 Birthday Honours
- Mullard Award of the Royal Society (1980)
- Scheele Award in 1975
- Foreign Honorary Member of the American Academy of Arts and Sciences in 1983.
- Honorary Doctorate of Science from the University of Exeter in 1980.
- Honorary Doctorate of Science from the University of Oxford in 1984.
- Honorary Doctorate of Science from the University of Strathclyde in 1989.
