= Tom Askwith =

British rower

Thomas Garrett Askwith (24 May 1911 – 16 July 2001) was a British Olympic rower and a colonial administrator in Kenya during the Mau Mau Uprising. He was Permanent Secretary in the British Ministry of African Affairs, and an Olympic rower in the 1932 Summer Olympics and the 1936 Summer Olympics.

== Early life ==
Tom Askwith was born in Cheam, Surrey. He was educated at Haileybury and matriculated at Peterhouse, Cambridge, in 1929, where he read Engineering. His father worked in insurance, but was killed at Ypres in 1917.

== Cambridge and rowing ==
Askwith joined Peterhouse Boat Club (PBC) in the Michaelmas term of 1929, and was Treasurer in 1930–31, and Captain the following year and part of the next. He was Secretary of the Cambridge University Boat Club in 1933. Askwith was a prolific oarsman, and in the Michaelmas term of 1931 became the first PBC oarsman since Lord Kelvin to win the Colquhoun sculls. In the Lent term of 1932 he rowed at 3 in the winning Blue boat in the University Boat Race. This crew won the Grand Challenge Cup at Henley Royal Regatta rowing as Leander Club, and was subsequently chosen to represent Great Britain at the 1932 Summer Olympics in Los Angeles. In 1933, Askwith again represented the winning Cambridge crew in the Boat Race, later that year winning the Diamond Challenge Sculls at Henley Royal Regatta by two lengths from H L Warren of Trinity Hall, choosing to race under Peterhouse colours over those of Leander Club. After this victory, The Observer remarked that Tom would surely be a 'Pothouse Immortal'. Askwith was again selected to represent Great Britain at the 1936 Berlin Olympics, finishing fourth in the VIII again.

== Colonial Service ==
After going down from Cambridge, Askwith worked briefly for Whitbread in London, before entering the British Colonial Service in 1935. Posted to Kenya in 1936, he was District Commissioner for Isiolo, and then Machakos.

From 1945 Askwith became the Municipal African Affairs Officer in Nairobi. Four years later, Tom was appointed Commissioner of Community Development and Principal of Jeanes School, Kabete – a training institution for African colonial development officers.

With his keen sporting background, Askwith chaired the Kenya Sports Association and was involved in promoting Kenyan participation in the Commonwealth and Olympic Games.

Askwith was appointed to organise the rehabilitation of those imprisoned during the 1952 Mau Mau uprising, but was later relieved of his duties when he suggested that the Kenyan government should be more humane, and rely less upon force and harsh conditions to impose order in the camps. His stance was vindicated after the 1959 inquiry into the deaths of 11 detainees, who were beaten to death at Hola Camp (see Hola massacre).

== Later life ==
Askwith finished his career as Permanent Secretary to Beniah Ohanga, the first African incumbent at the Ministry of African Affairs, retiring in 1961. Tom spent the next year working as a community development officer in Afghanistan, and worked in a similar role for the British government in Turkey from 1964 until 1966.

Askwith recorded his memoirs in three volumes, From Mau Mau to Harambee (1995), Getting My Knees Brown (1996) and Eyeball to Eyeball (1998).

== Family ==
Askwith married Patricia Noad (died 1999) in 1939; they had two sons and a daughter.

== See also ==
- List of Cambridge University Boat Race crews
