= Cecil Pearce =

Australian rower

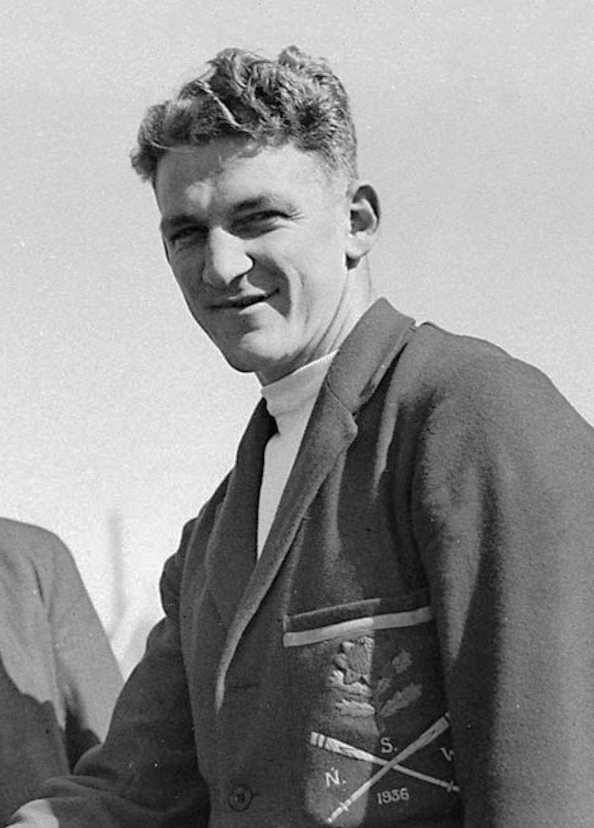

Personal information
- Born: 5 May 1913 Woollahra, New South Wales, Australia
- Died: 27 March 2002 (aged 87) Balmain, New South Wales, Australia

Sport
- Sport: Rowing
- Club: Balmain Rowing Club
Medal record
Representing Australia
British Empire Games
Gold medal – first place	1938 Sydney	Double sculls

Cecil Arthur Pearce (5 May 1913 – 27 March 2002) was an Australian representative rower. He was a four-time Australian national champion who won the double sculls event at the 1938 British Empire Games and competed in the single sculls at the 1936 Olympics.

== Sporting pedigree ==
Cecil Pearce was born in Woollahra, Sydney, Australia, into a family with an extraordinary sporting pedigree. His great-grandfather emigrated from England in 1850 and settled in Double Bay, in Sydney's harbourside district, where he worked as a fisherman and ran a boatshed. Pearce's grandfather Henry John "Harry" Pearce Sr. was an Australian champion in sculling. Harry Pearce had five sons and seven daughters. One of those daughters (Cecil's aunt) was a New South Wales swimming champion.

Cecil Pearce's father Sandy Pearce, was a national rugby league representative inducted into that sport's Australian Hall of Fame. Cecil's brother Sid Pearce also played rugby league for Australia. Cecil's son Gary Pearce would row in three Olympic games from 1964 to 1972.

Cecil's uncle, Henry J "Harry, Jr" Pearce Jr., was an Australian sculling champion and challenged for the world championship twice (in 1911 and 1913), losing to Richard Arnst (NZL) and Ernest Barry (GBR) respectively. Harry's son Bobby Pearce (Cecil's cousin and eight years his senior) was the most accomplished rower in the family. Bobby – a sculler like Cecil – was a three-time world champion (1933, 1934 and 1938); twice Olympic champion (1928 and 1932); three time Australian national champion; and won the Diamond Sculls at Henley in 1931.

== Club and state rowing ==
Cecil Pearce's took up rowing at age eighteen and rowed from the Balmain Rowing Club. He was first selected as the New South Wales state entrant to contest the President's Cup – the interstate single sculls championship – at the 1936 Interstate Regatta. He won that title in 1936 and then won the event in 1937, 1938 and 1939.

== International representative rowing ==
Pearce's chief Australian and New South Wales rival early in his career was Herb Turner. Although Turner was the 1935 Australian single-sculls champion, Pearce beat him in selection trials for the 1936 Summer Olympics. Pearce was chosen as the single sculler and Turner was selected to row the double scull with Pearce. The rowing selectors also nominated Pearce and Turner in a double scull. However the AOF selection committee preferred to see Pearce focus on the single and Turner rowed the double with the Bill Dixon the reserve for the men's eight. In Berlin Pearce finished fourth in his heat, then second in the repechage and failed to reach the final.

For the 1938 British Empire Games the selection intrigue was reversed. Pearce was the Australian national champion but Turner beat him in trials for the single sculls selection. Pearce rowed the double sculls event at the Empire Games in Sydney, with William Bradley and won a gold medal.

== War service ==
In World War II Pearce served as a sergeant in the Royal Australian Air Force. He enlisted in 1943 just before his 30th birthday and was discharged at the war's end.
