= Hermann Kubik =

Austrian rower (1907–1977)

Hermann Kubick
Personal information
- Nationality: Austrian
- Born: 27 January 1907; Klagenfurt, Austria-Hungary
- Died: 27 May 1977; Klagenfurt, Austria

Sport
- Sport: Rowing

Hermann Kubick (27 January 1907 – 27 May 1977) was an Austrian rower. He competed in the men's double sculls event at the 1936 Summer Olympics.
