= Joachim Pirsch =

German rower

Personal information
- Born: 26 October 1914
- Died: 25 August 1988 (aged 73)

Sport
- Sport: Rowing
- Club: Berliner Ruder-Verein Alemannia; Skuller-Zelle, Berlin
Medal record
Men's rowing
Representing Nazi Germany
Olympic Games
Silver medal – second place	1936 Berlin	Double sculls
European Rowing Championships
Gold medal – first place	1937 Amsterdam	Double sculls

Joachim Pirsch (26 October 1914 – 25 August 1988) was a German rower who competed in the 1936 Summer Olympics.

In 1936 he won the silver medal with his partner Willi Kaidel in the Olympic double sculls competition.
