= Arquímedes Juanicó =

Uruguayan rower

Personal information
- Nationality: Uruguayan
- Born: 20 February 1908

Sport
- Sport: Rowing

Arquímedes Juanicó (born 20 February 1908, date of death unknown) was a Uruguayan rower. He competed in the men's single sculls event at the 1936 Summer Olympics.
