= Bill Dixon (rower) =

Australian rower

Personal information
- Full name: William John Dixon
- Nationality: Australian
- Born: 9 November 1912 Sydney, Australia
- Died: 10 June 1969 (aged 56) New South Wales, Australia
- Education: St Joseph's College

Sport
- Sport: Rowing
- Club: Sydney Rowing Club

Achievements and titles
- Olympic finals: 1936 Berlin Olympics M2X
- National finals: King's Cup 1933-39
Medal record
Representing Australia
British Empire Games
Silver medal – second place	1938 Sydney	M8+

William John Dixon (9 November 1912 – 10 June 1969) was an Australian rower. He was a four-time national champion who competed in the men's double sculls event at the 1936 Summer Olympics.

== Club and state rowing ==
Dixon was educated at St Joseph's College, Hunters Hill with 1929 as his senior year. His senior rowing was from the Sydney Rowing Club and in the 1931–32 season he stroked a Sydney maiden four. He won a New South Wales state championship in the coxed four the following year.

In 1933 Dixon made state selection in the New South Wales men's eight which contested and won the King's Cup at the Interstate Regatta. He rowed in four successive King's Cup winning New South Wales eights between 1933 and 1936 and then contested the event on three further occasions from 1937 to 1939.

In 1939 Dixon rowed in a Sydney Rowing Club which contested the Grand Challenge Cup at the Henley Royal Regatta. They won their first round and were knocked out in the second.

== International representative rowing ==
In 1936 Australian Olympic Federation funding was scarce. The NSW Police Rowing Club eight which dominated the Sydney club season and the New South Wales state championship was selected in toto as Australia's men's eight to compete at the 1936 Berlin Olympics with their attendance wholly funded by the NSW Police Federation. Cecil Pearce was the selected single sculler and Herb Turner picked for the double. The selectors picked Dixon as the reserve sweep-oarsman and asked him to row the double-scull with Turner. Though Dixon had not sculled before selection, he and Turner were the best performers of the three Australian boats in Berlin. They made the Olympic final and placed sixth.

In 1938 Dixon was one of five New South Welshman selected in the men's eight for the 1938 Commonwealth Games. That eight took the silver medal behind the British crew.

== War service ==
In WWII Dixon served in the Australian Army. He enlisted early in the war in 1940 and had the rank of sergeant with the 2/5th Field regiment when was discharged at the war's end in 1945.
