= Ernst Rufli =

Swiss rower (1910–1996)

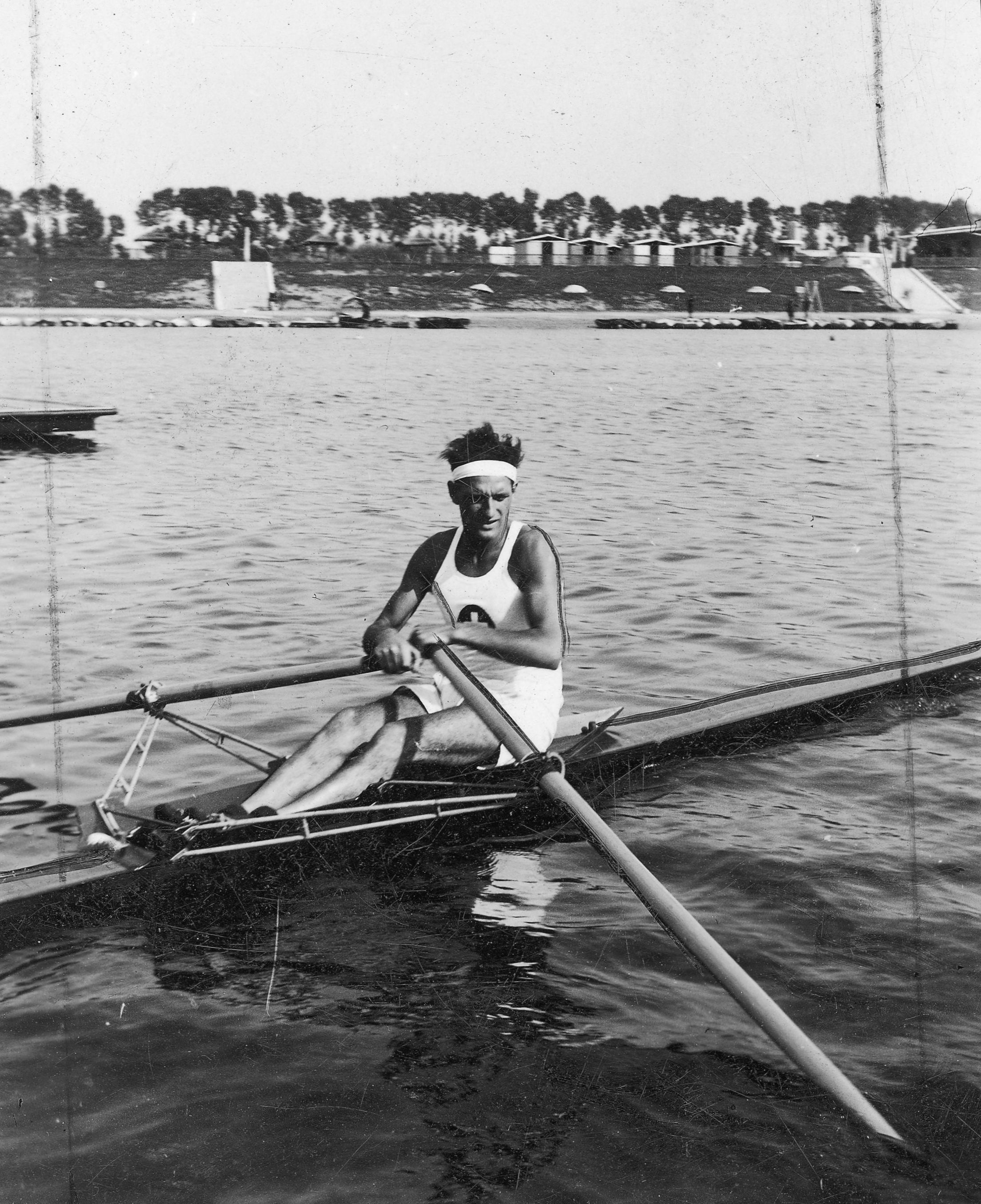
- Rufli in 1938

Personal information
- Born: 12 April 1910
- Died: 14 August 1996 (aged 86)

Sport
- Sport: Rowing
Medal record
Men's rowing
Representing Switzerland
European Rowing Championships
| Silver medal – second place | 1933 Budapest | Coxless pair |
| Silver medal – second place | 1935 Berlin | Eight |
| Bronze medal – third place | 1938 Milan | Single sculls |

Ernst Rufli (12 April 1910 – 14 August 1996) was a Swiss rower who competed at the 1936 Summer Olympics.

Rufli was born in 1910. He was initially a goalkeeper for FC Zürich but changed to rowing and sculled for Ruderclub Zürich. In 1935 and 1936 he won the Diamond Challenge Sculls at Henley Royal Regatta in England. Rufli came fifth in the single scull rowing for Switzerland at the 1936 Summer Olympics in Berlin.
