= Josef Hasenöhrl =

Austrian rower

Personal information
- Born: 5 May 1915 Vienna
- Died: 13 March 1945 (aged 29) Luxembourg

Sport
- Sport: Rowing
- Club: RV Ellida
Medal record
Men's rowing
Representing Austria
Olympic Games
Silver medal – second place	1936 Berlin	Single sculls
European Rowing Championships
Bronze medal – third place	1935 Berlin	Single sculls
Silver medal – second place	1937 Amsterdam	Single sculls
Gold medal – first place	1938 Milan	Single sculls

Josef Hasenöhrl (5 May 1915 – 13 March 1945 in Schöndorf (an der Ruwer)) was an Austrian rower who competed in the 1936 Summer Olympics. He was killed in action in World War II.

Hasenöhrl was a sculler with Ruderverein Ellida, Vienna. In 1936 he won the silver medal in the single sculls competition rowing at the 1936 Summer Olympics. In 1937 he won the Diamond Challenge Sculls at Henley Royal Regatta beating J F Coulson in the final. His coach was Tom Sullivan.

Hasenöhrl was serving as a lieutenant with the Wehrmacht when he lost his life on the Western Front (World War II) at the end of the Second World War.

He is buried at Sandweiler (Block P, Grab 214).
