= Charles Campbell (Canadian rower) =

Canadian rower

Personal information
- Born: 2 July 1914; Moose Jaw, Saskatchewan, Canada
- Died: 8 June 1963 (aged 48); Toronto, Ontario, Canada

Sport
- Sport: Rowing

Charles Alfred Campbell (2 July 1914 – 8 June 1963) was a Canadian rower. He competed in the men's single sculls event at the 1936 Summer Olympics. He was born in Moose Jaw, Saskatchewan and moved to Toronto in 1927. He died after a heart attack in 1963.
