= Henri Banos =

French rower (1913–1969)

Personal information
- Full name: Henri Hubert Banos
- Nationality: French
- Born: 7 November 1913; Joinville-le-Pont, France
- Died: 15 February 1969 (aged 55); Paris, France

Sport
- Sport: Rowing

Henri Banos (7 November 1913 – 15 February 1969) was a French rower. He competed in the men's single sculls event at the 1936 Summer Olympics.
