= Dan Barrow =

American rower (1909–1993)

- Born: Daniel Hubert Barrow Jr. July 22, 1909; Yeadon, Pennsylvania, U.S.
- Died: November 4, 1993 (aged 84); Harrisburg, Pennsylvania, U.S.
- Occupation: Athlete (rower)

Olympic medal record

Men's rowing
Bronze medal – third place	1936 Berlin	Single sculls

Daniel Hubert Barrow, Jr. (July 22, 1909 – November 4, 1993) was an American rower who competed in the 1936 Summer Olympics, and won a bronze medal in single sculls.

== Early life ==
Barrow was born in Yeadon, Pennsylvania, and raised in Lansdowne, the eldest of twelve children born to Elizabeth Florence Stewart Barrow and Daniel H. Barrow. He attended West Philadelphia Catholic High School.

== Rowing career ==
Barrow was recruited by Jack Kelly Sr. for the Pennsylvania Athletic Club's "Big Eight". This Penn AC crew, which, besides Dan Barrow, included Chester Turner, Joe Dougherty, Myrlin Janes, John McNichol, Jack Bratten, Tom Curran and Charley McIlvaine along with coxswain Tom Mack, were undefeated in all of their 31 races between 1928 and 1932. A notable victory included winning the 1930 FISA world rowing championship in Liège, Belgium, by two boat lengths after breaking the world record for 2,000 meters in an earlier heat.

In 1936, Barrow qualified for the Olympic finals in single sculls, and won the bronze medal in the single sculls competition at the Olympics. Despite rowing in a much heavier boat (European rowers used newer, lighter, sculls), Barrow initially was rowing in second place. However, his boat was bumped by the boat of another rower and he lost ground, falling back to fourth place. He was able to regain enough ground in the time remaining to win the bronze medal.

== Later years and death ==
After he retired from rowing in 1937, Barrow was an insurance agent and underwriter for more than thirty years. He was inducted into the West Catholic High School Athletic Hall of Fame, and spoke about sports for local audiences. He married Eleanor Geraldine Doyle in 1941, and they had seven children. His wife died in 1978, his son Daniel died at sea in 1989, and Barrow died in 1993, at the age of 84, at a medical center in Harrisburg.
