= Bill Dugan (rower) =

American rower (1913–1996)

Personal information
- Born: June 13, 1913 Philadelphia, Pennsylvania, United States
- Died: July 15, 1996 (aged 83) Atlantic City, New Jersey, United States

Sport
- Sport: Rowing

Bill Dugan (June 13, 1913 – July 15, 1996) was an American rower. He competed in the men's double sculls event at the 1936 Summer Olympics.
