= Eugen Studach =

Swiss rower (1907–1995)

Personal information
- Born: 18 November 1907
- Died: 15 May 1995 (aged 87) Küsnacht, Switzerland

Sport
- Sport: Rowing
Medal record
Men's rowing
Representing Switzerland
European Rowing Championships
| Silver medal – second place | 1933 Budapest | Single sculls |
| Silver medal – second place | 1935 Berlin | Single sculls |
| Gold medal – first place | 1937 Amsterdam | Single sculls |

Eugen Studach (18 November 1907 – 15 May 1995) was a Swiss rower. He competed at the 1936 Summer Olympics in Berlin with the men's double sculls where they were eliminated in the semi-finals.
