= Heinrich Lebensaft =

Austrian footballer (1905–1991)

Personal information
- Date of birth: 22 March 1905
- Date of death: 25 December 1991 (aged 86)

International career
Years	Team	Apps	(Gls)
1924–1927	Austria	6	(0)

Heinrich Lebensaft (22 March 1905 – 25 December 1991) was an Austrian footballer. He played in six matches for the Austria national football team from 1924 to 1927.
