= Vladimír Vaina =

Czech rower

Personal information
- Nationality: Czech
- Born: 2 November 1909
- Died: 8 February 1996 (aged 86)

Sport
- Sport: Rowing

Vladimír Vaina (2 November 1909 – 8 February 1996) was a Czech rower. He competed in the men's double sculls event at the 1936 Summer Olympics.
