= Eric Harrower =

Australian rules footballer

Personal information
- Full name: Eric James Harrower
- Born: 3 November 1907; Geelong, Victoria
- Died: 28 February 1996 (aged 88); Manifold Heights, Victoria

Playing career^{1}
| Years | Club | Games (Goals) |
| 1931 | South Melbourne | 3 (0) |
- ^{1} Playing statistics correct to the end of 1931.

Eric James Harrower (3 November 1907 – 28 February 1996) was an Australian rules footballer who played with South Melbourne in the Victorian Football League (VFL).
