= Norris Phillips =

American baseball player

- Pitcher
- Born: June 18, 1916; Rosenberg, Texas, U.S.
- Died: February 4, 1996 (aged 79); Seattle, Washington, U.S.
- Batted: Left Threw: Right

Negro league baseball debut
- 1942, for the Memphis Red Sox

Last appearance
- 1943, for the Kansas City Monarchs

Teams
- Memphis Red Sox (1942); Kansas City Monarchs (1942-1943)

Norris "Playboy" Phillips (June 18, 1916 - February 4, 1996) was an American professional baseball pitcher in the Negro leagues. He played with the Memphis Red Sox in 1942 and the Kansas City Monarchs in 1942 and 1943.
