= Wilhelm Straßburger =

German footballer

Personal information
- Full name: Wilhelm Straßburger
- Date of birth: 12 July 1907
- Place of birth: Duisburg, German Empire
- Date of death: 21 December 1991 (aged 84)
- Place of death: Germany
- Position: Defender

Senior career*
| Years | Team | Apps | (Gls) |
| 1925–1940 | Duisburger SpV | | |

International career
| 1930 | Germany | 2 | (0) |
- * Club domestic league appearances and goals

Wilhelm Straßburger (12 July 1907 – 21 December 1991), nicknamed Willi or Willy, was a German footballer who played as a defender and made two appearances for the Germany national team.

== Career ==
Straßburger made his international debut for Germany on 7 September 1930 in a friendly match against Denmark, which finished as a 3–6 loss in Copenhagen. He earned his second and final cap on 2 November 1930 in a friendly against Norway, which finished as a 1–1 draw in Breslau.

== Personal life ==
Straßburger died on 21 December 1991 at the age of 84.

== Career statistics ==
=== International ===
Germany
| Year | Apps | Goals |
|---|---|---|
| 1930 | 2 | 0 |
| Total | 2 | 0 |
