= Gavin Morgan (footballer) =

Australian rules footballer, born 1911

Personal information
- Full name: Roy Gavin Morgan
- Born: 17 November 1911; Geelong, Victoria
- Died: 29 December 1991 (aged 80)
- Height: 166 cm (5 ft 5 in)
- Weight: 65 kg (143 lb)

Playing career^{1}
Years	Club	Games (Goals)
1932–33	Essendon	6 (0)
- ^{1} Playing statistics correct to the end of 1933.

Roy Gavin Morgan (17 November 1911 – 29 December 1991) was an Australian rules footballer who played with Essendon in the Victorian Football League (VFL).
