= John Houser (rower) =

American rower

Personal information
- Born: December 2, 1909 Philadelphia, Pennsylvania, United States
- Died: December 29, 1991 (aged 82)

Sport
- Sport: Rowing

John Houser (December 2, 1909 – December 29, 1991) was an American rower. He competed in the men's double sculls event at the 1936 Summer Olympics.
