= Drago Matulaj =

Croatian rower

Personal information
- Nationality: Croatian
- Born: 18 February 1911; Gradiška, Austria-Hungary
- Died: 14 February 1996 (aged 84); Zagreb, Croatia

Sport
- Sport: Rowing

Drago Matulaj (18 February 1911 – 14 February 1996) was a Croatian rower. He competed in the men's double sculls event at the 1936 Summer Olympics.
