= Jerzy Ustupski =

Polish rower (1911–2004)

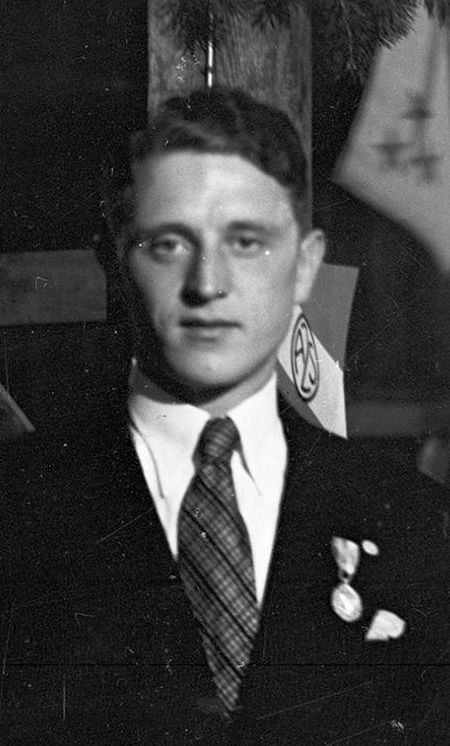
- Ustupski in 1935

Personal information
- Born: 1 April 1911 Zakopane, Austria-Hungary
- Died: 25 October 2004 (aged 93) Zakopane, Poland
- Height: 180 cm (5 ft 11 in)
- Weight: 78 kg (172 lb)

Sport
- Sport: Rowing
- Club: AZS Kraków
Medal record
Men's rowing
Representing Poland
Olympic Games
Bronze medal – third place	1936 Berlin	Double sculls
European Rowing Championships
Bronze medal – third place	1932 Belgrade	Double sculls
Gold medal – first place	1935 Berlin	Double sculls

Jerzy Ustupski (1 April 1911 – 25 October 2004) was a Polish rower who competed in the 1936 Summer Olympics.

He was born in Zakopane in 1911.

At the 1936 Summer Olympics he won the bronze medal with his partner Roger Verey in the double sculls competition.

He was a member of the Home Army (Armia Krajowa) during World War II and fought in the Warsaw Uprising in 1944.

He died in Zakopane in 2004.
