= Humphrey Warren =

English rower (1910–1978)

Humphrey Lloyd Warren (15 May 1910 – 14 July 1978) was an English rower who competed for Great Britain at the 1936 Summer Olympics.

Warren was born in St. Ives, Cambridgeshire. In 1932 he was granted a commission as a pilot officer but was also at Trinity Hall, Cambridge where he was a rower. In 1933 he was runner-up in the Diamond Challenge Sculls to Tom Askwith. In 1934 he was Champion of the Wye at the Hereford Regatta. He competed in the single scull representing Great Britain at the 1936 Summer Olympics in Berlin, but was unplaced.

During World War II Warren served in the Royal Air Force. As a flight lieutenant he was awarded the Air Force Cross in 1941. In 1944 as squadron leader of No. 220 Squadron RAF, he was awarded the DFC.

In 1946 he was runner up with Guy Newton in the Double Sculls Challenge Cup at Henley Royal Regatta.
