= Rowing at the 1936 Summer Olympics – Men's double sculls =

Men's double sculls at the Games of the XI Olympiad
- Date: 12–14 August 1936
- Competitors: 24 from 12 nations

Medalists
1st place, gold medalist(s)		Jack Beresford; Dick Southwood	Great Britain
2nd place, silver medalist(s)		Willi Kaidel; Joachim Pirsch	Germany
3rd place, bronze medalist(s)		Roger Verey; Jerzy Ustupski	Poland

The men's double sculls competition at the 1936 Summer Olympics in Berlin took place are at Grünau on the Langer See.

== Schedule ==
Date	Round
12 August 1936	Heats
13 August 1936	Semifinal
14 August 1936	Final

== Results ==
=== Heats ===
First boat of each heat qualified to the final, remainder goes to the semifinal.

==== Heat 1 ====
Rank	Rowers	Country	Time	Notes
1	André Giriat; Robert Jacquet	France	6:46.5	Q
2	Roger Verey; Jerzy Ustupski	Poland	6:50.0	
3	Károly Bazini; Egon Bazini	Hungary	6:51.9	
4	Bill Dixon; Herb Turner	Australia	6:55.6	
5	John Houser; Bill Dugan	United States	6:55.6	
6	Vladimír Vaina; Josef Straka	Czechoslovakia	7:07.2	

==== Heat 2 ====
Rank	Rowers	Country	Time	Notes
1	Willi Kaidel; Joachim Pirsch	Germany	6:41.0	Q
2	Jack Beresford; Dick Southwood	Great Britain	6:44.9	
3	Kurt Haas; Eugen Studach	Switzerland	6:56.9	
4	Vid Fašaić; Drago Matulaj	Yugoslavia	7:17.7	
5	Fritz Moser; Hermann Kubik	Austria	7:21.1	
6	Adamor Gonçalves; Paschoal Rapuano	Brazil	7:26.3	

=== Semifinal ===
First two qualify to the final.

==== Heat 1 ====
Rank	Rowers	Country	Time	Notes
1	Bill Dixon; Herb Turner	Australia	7:58.8	Q
2	Roger Verey; Jerzy Ustupski	Poland	8:02.8	Q
3	Károly Bazini; Egon Bazini	Hungary	8:05.2	
4	Kurt Haas; Eugen Studach	Switzerland	8:06.2	
5	Adamor Gonçalves; Paschoal Rapuano	Brazil	8:30.2	

==== Heat 2 ====
Rank	Rowers	Country	Time	Notes
1	Jack Beresford; Dick Southwood	Great Britain	7:48.0	Q
2	John Houser; Bill Dugan	United States	8:02.8	Q
3	Vladimír Vaina; Josef Straka	Czechoslovakia	8:07.2	
4	Vid Fašaić; Drago Matulaj	Yugoslavia	8:22.8	
5	Fritz Moser; Hermann Kubik	Austria	8:29.1	

=== Final ===
Rank	Rowers	Country	Time	Notes
1st place, gold medalist(s)	Jack Beresford; Dick Southwood	Great Britain	7:20.8	
2nd place, silver medalist(s)	Willi Kaidel; Joachim Pirsch	Germany	7:26.2	
3rd place, bronze medalist(s)	Roger Verey; Jerzy Ustupski	Poland	7:36.2	
4	André Giriat; Robert Jacquet	France	7:42.3	
5	John Houser; Bill Dugan	United States	7:44.8	
6	Bill Dixon; Herb Turner	Australia	7:45.1	
