= Slaley =

Slaley may refer to:

- Slaley, Derbyshire
- Slaley, Northumberland
