= Josephus Serré =

Dutch modern pentathlete

Personal information
- Born: 3 February 1907 Bergen op Zoom, Netherlands
- Died: 14 December 1991 (aged 84) Melbourne, Australia

Sport
- Sport: Modern pentathlon

Josephus Serré (3 February 1907 – 14 December 1991) was a Dutch modern pentathlete. He competed at the 1936 Summer Olympics.
