= Eddie Marks =

Irish cricketer

Personal information
- Full name: Alfred Edgar Marks
- Born: 15 May 1924; Belfast, Northern Ireland
- Died: 14 February 1996 (aged 71); Belfast, Northern Ireland
- Batting: Right-handed
- Role: Wicket-keeper

Domestic team information
- Years: Team
- 1953–1955: Ireland

Career statistics
Competition	First-class
Matches	3
Runs scored	35
Batting average	5.83
100s/50s	–/–
Top score	17
Balls bowled	0
Wickets	–
Bowling average	–
5 wickets in innings	–
10 wickets in match	–
Best bowling	–
Catches/stumpings	5/2
- Source: Cricinfo, 24 October 2018

Alfred Edgar 'Eddie' Marks (15 May 1924 – 14 February 1996) was an Irish first-class cricketer.

Born at Belfast, Marks was educated at Methodist College Belfast. Playing club cricket for North of Ireland Cricket Club and North Down in Belfast, Marks made his debut in first-class cricket for Ireland against Glamorgan at Margam during Ireland's 1953 tour of England and Wales. Two further first-class appearances for Ireland followed, both against Scotland in 1954 and 1955. He struggled with the bat in his three matches, scoring just 35 runs with a highest score of 17. In his capacity as a wicket-keeper, he took five catches and made two stumpings. Outside of cricket, he was employed as a draughtsman at Harland and Wolff shipyard. He died at Belfast in February 1996.
