= Franco Zucchi (sailor) =

Italian sailor

Franco Zucchi (22 November 1917 – 24 February 1996) was an Italian sailor who competed in the 1960 Summer Olympics.
