= Roger Verey =

Polish rower

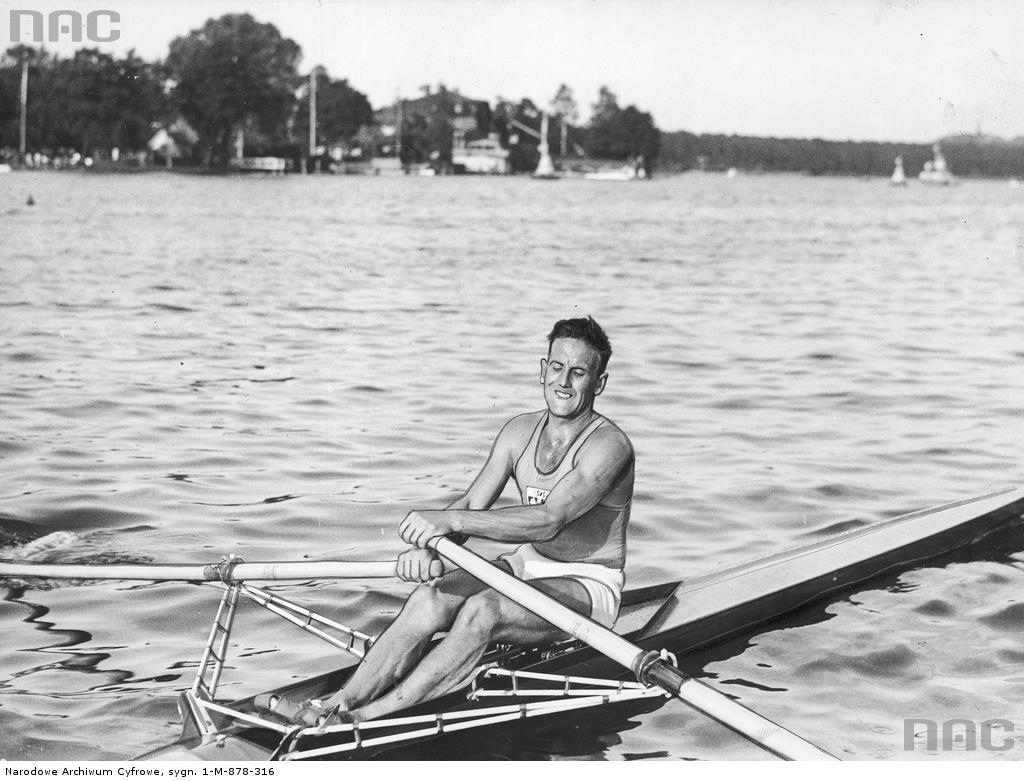
- Roger Verey, Berlin 1936

Personal information
- Born: Roger Roland Verey; 14 March 1912 Lausanne, Switzerland
- Died: 6 September 2000 (aged 88) Kraków, Poland
- Height: 186 cm (6 ft 1 in)
- Weight: 82 kg (181 lb)

Sport
- Sport: Rowing
Medal record
Men's rowing
Representing Poland
Olympic Games
Bronze medal – third place	1936 Berlin	Double sculls
European Rowing Championships
Bronze medal – third place	1932 Belgrade	Double sculls
Gold medal – first place	1933 Budapest	Single sculls
Silver medal – second place	1934 Lucerne	Single sculls
Gold medal – first place	1935 Berlin	Single sculls
Gold medal – first place	1935 Berlin	Double sculls
Bronze medal – third place	1937 Amsterdam	Single sculls
Silver medal – second place	1938 Milan	Single sculls

Roger Roland Verey (14 March 1912 – 6 September 2000) was a Polish rower who competed in the 1936 Summer Olympics.

He was born in Lausanne, Switzerland and died in Kraków. In 1936 he won the bronze medal with his partner Jerzy Ustupski in the double sculls competition rowing at the 1936 Summer Olympics. In 1939 he was runner-up in the Diamond Challenge Sculls at Henley Royal Regatta to Joe Burk.
