= Gustav Schäfer (rower) =

German rower

Personal information
- Born: 22 September 1906 Johanngeorgenstadt, Kingdom of Saxony, German Empire
- Died: 12 December 1991 (aged 85) Munich, Germany

Sport
- Sport: Rowing
Medal record
Men's rowing
Representing Nazi Germany
Olympic Games
Gold medal – first place	1936 Berlin	Single sculls
Gold Cup Challenge
Gold medal – first place	1936 Philadelphia	Single sculls
European Rowing Championships
Gold medal – first place	1934 Lucerne	Single sculls

Gustav Schäfer (22 September 1906 – 12 December 1991) was a German rower who became Olympic champion in the single sculls at the 1936 Summer Olympics.

He was born in Johanngeorgenstadt. In 1911, his family moved to Dresden. Schäfer's sporting career started in swimming. After school, he trained as a baker. He first tried rowing in 1929 when a rowing club in the suburb of Blasewitz made its club house available for a dance; he started training in March 1929.

At the 1936 Summer Olympics he won the gold medal in the single sculls competition. He died in Munich in 1991.
