= James Runcieman Sutherland =

English scholar and 18th century expert and author (1900–1996)

Sir James Runcieman Sutherland, FBA (26 April 1900 – 24 February 1996) was an English literary scholar, Lord Northcliffe Professor of Modern Literature at London University.

== Life ==
Sutherland was born on 26 April 1900 in Aberdeen. He was educated at Aberdeen Grammar School and Aberdeen University before studying at Merton College, Oxford. From 1930 to 1936 he was Senior Lecturer at University College London. He married Helen Dircks in 1931. From 1936 to 1944 he was Professor of English Literature, and from 1944 to 1951 Professor of English Language and Literature at Queen Mary College. In 1951 he was appointed Lord Northcliffe Professor of Modern English Literature at University College London, and he held the chair until retirement in 1967. From 1957 to 1962 he was Public Orator at London University.

He was elected a Fellow of the British Academy in 1953.

After his first wife died in 1975, he married Mrs Eve Betts in 1977. He was knighted in 1992. He died in Oxford on 24 February 1996.

== Works ==
- The Medium of Poetry (1934)
- Defoe (1937)
- A Preface to Eighteenth Century Poetry (1938)
- The Tempest (1939)
- Background for Queen Anne (1939)
- Fifteen Poets: Chaucer, Spenser, Shakespeare, Milton, Dryden, Pope, Cowper, Coleridge, Wordsworth, Shelley, Byron, Keats, Browning, Tennyson, Arnold (1941)
- The Dunciad (1942)
- Wordsworth and Pope (1944)
- The Oxford Book of English Talk (1952)
- Defoe (1954; revised 1970) (Writers and Their Work, no. 51)
- Restoration & Augustan Prose; Papers delivered by James R. Sutherland and Ian Watt at the Third Clark Library Seminar, 14 July 1956 (1956)
- Early Eighteenth Century Poetry (1956)
- On English Prose (1957)
- English Satire (1958)
- Shakespeare's World (1964) (editor with Joel Hurstfield)
- Robinson Crusoe, and other Writings (1968)
- English Literature of the late Seventeenth Century (1969)
- Daniel Defoe: A Critical Study (1971)
- The Oxford Book of Literary Anecdotes (1975) (editor)
- Restoration Tragedies (1977)
- The Restoration Newspaper and its Development (1986)
- Restoration Literature 1660-1700: Dryden, Bunyan, and Pepys (1990) (The Oxford History of English Literature series)
