= Charlie Sloley =

Australian rules footballer, born 1906

Personal information
- Full name: John Charles Sloley
- Born: 13 September 1906; Footscray, Victoria
- Died: 23 February 1996 (aged 89); Port Melbourne, Victoria
- Original team: Port Melbourne

Playing career^{1}
Years	Club	Games (Goals)
1927–29	Footscray	25 (35)
- ^{1} Playing statistics correct to the end of 1929.

John Charles Sloley (13 September 1906 – 23 February 1996) was an Australian rules footballer who played with Footscray in the Victorian Football League (VFL).
