= Paschoal Rapuano =

Brazilian rower 1910 – 2003

Paschoal Caetano Rapuano (23 May 1910 – 11 December 2003) was a Brazilian rower who competed in the 1936 Summer Olympics. He was born in Rio de Janeiro in 1910 and died there in 2003.
