= Thames Punting Club =

English governing body for the sport of punt racing

- Sport: Punt racing
- Founded: 1885

The Thames Punting Club (TPC) is the governing body in England for the sport of punt racing.

== History and constitution ==
Punting as a means of water travel has a long history in the United Kingdom and is now practiced recreationally on a number of rivers, being most obviously associated with Oxford and Cambridge universities. Punt racing, as a sport developed in the 1880s. Thames Punting Club was formed in 1885 as a racing club. It is now no longer a racing club but functions as the sport's governing body.

The Thames Punting Club maintains lists of umpires and publishes a handbook containing rules and bye-laws for those organizing punt races on the Thames. Punting uses a complex system of Handicapping and the TPC sets the handicaps of individual punters.

The TPA organises the annual Thames Punting Championships.

== Punt racing ==
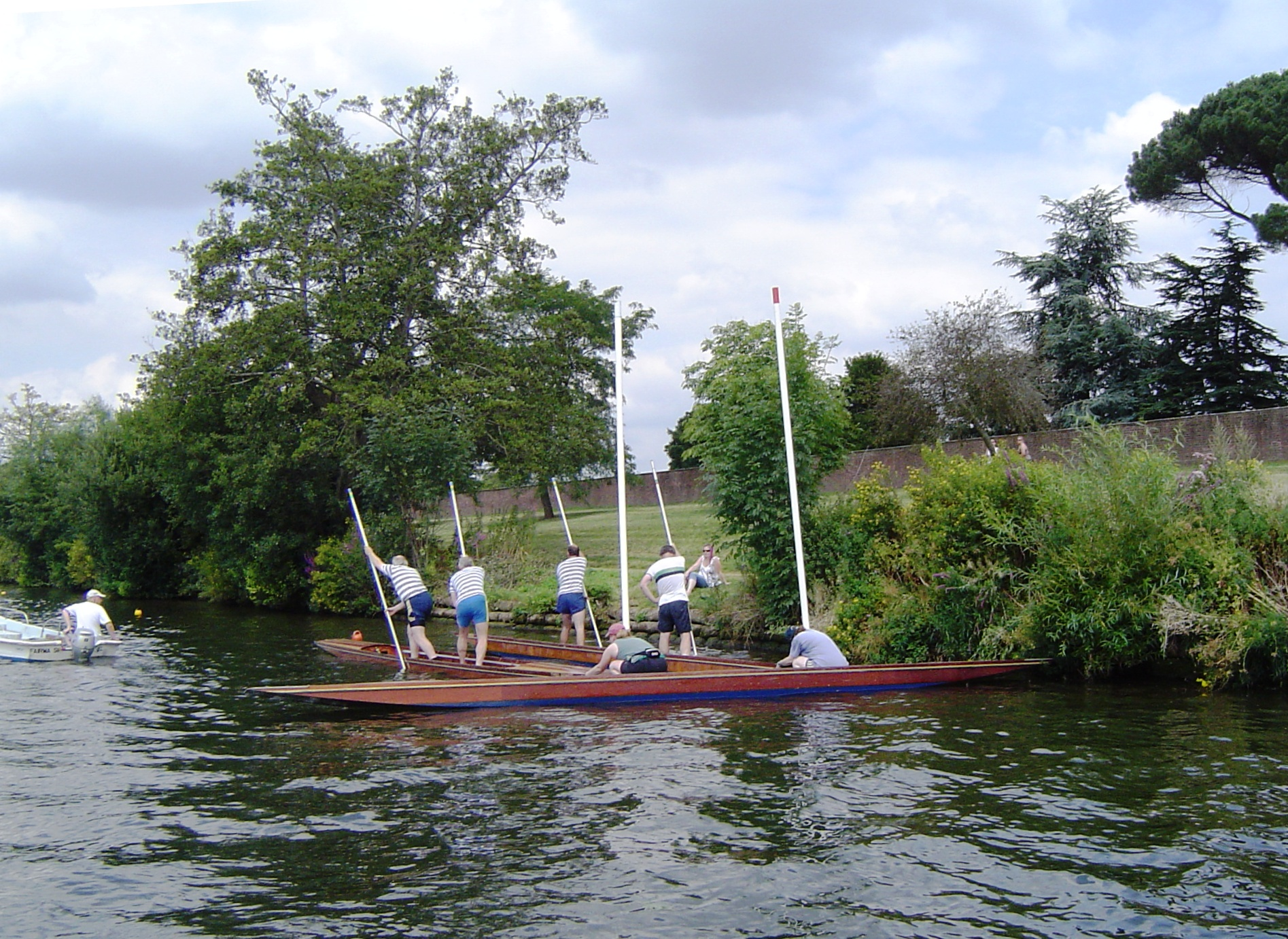
Start of a punt race

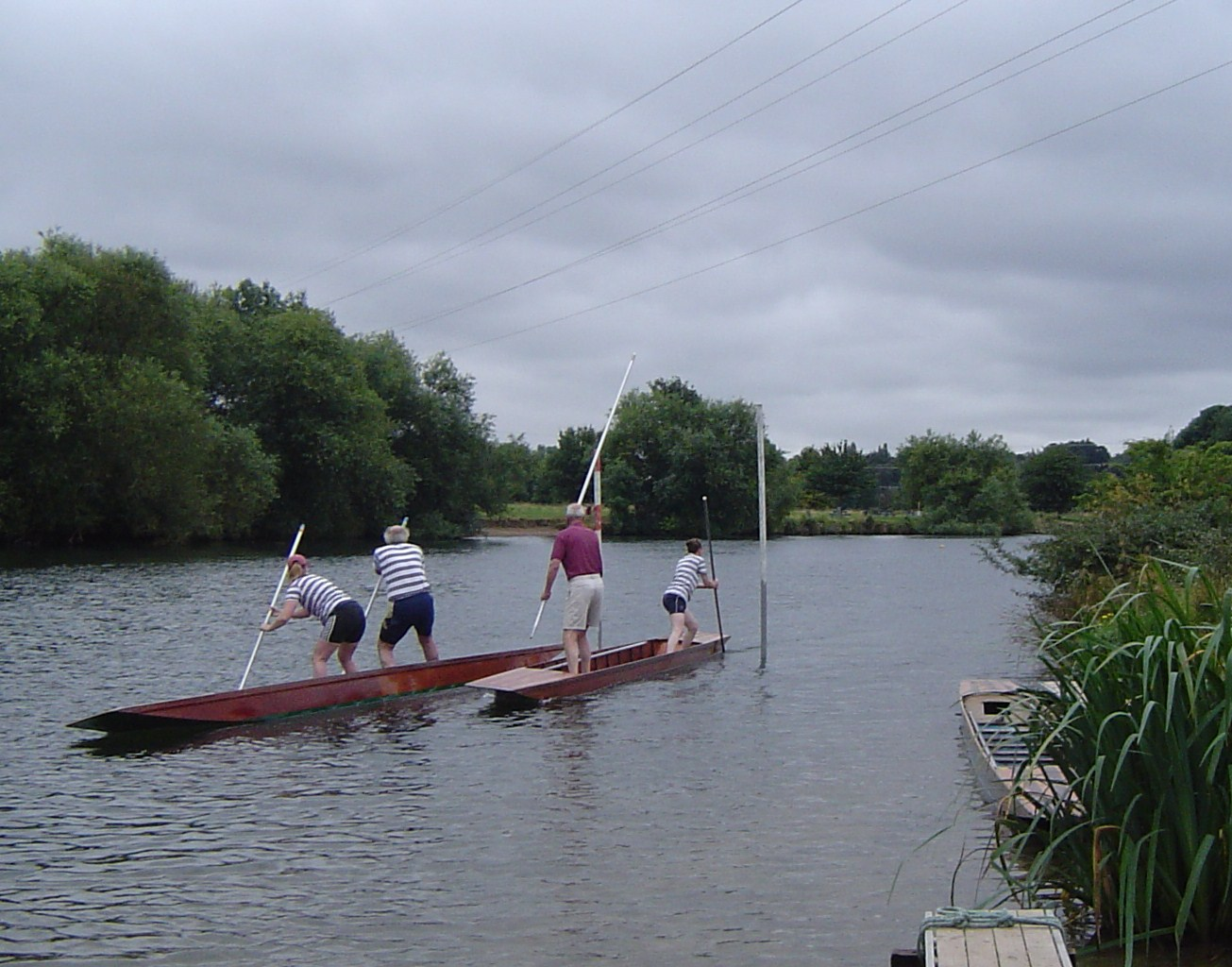
"Stopping up" at the rye-peck turn

Races are normally held in standard "2 foot punts", that is punts that are 2 ft (60 cm) wide in the middle and about 18 inches (45 cm) wide at each end and these are subject to handicap rules. There are also non-handicap races for punts which have no restrictions on width or length. Punts used for these races are called "best boats" or "best-and-best" punts; the name comes from the "best" boat that you can find and the "best" boat that your opponent can. The narrowest of these boats are no more than 15 inches (40 cm) wide. All racing punts generally have a till at both ends, and may have canvas covers to reduce the amount of water splashing into the boat.

Races are normally held over a distance of up to 880 yards (800 m) along the bank on a straight reach of the river. Each end of the course is marked by a pair of poles called "ryepecks" which are firmly pushed into the river bed before the race. Races are always one punt against another, and are either singles or doubles races depending on the number of punters in the punts. One punt has the inner lane and the other the outer lane. If the outer lane has consistently deeper water, or if there is a significant adverse bend, then the length of the outer course may be reduced to make the race more even.

The competitors usually start with their punts' sterns level with the line between the downstream ryepecks, punt to the upstream ryepecks, and then punt back. The winner is the first to pass the line of the starting ryepecks or the first one to hit his or her own ryepeck. In doubles, both punters must still be in the boat at the finish. The turn at the upstream ryepecks is done by "stopping-up"; that is the competitor passes the ryepeck on the outside, stops his or her punt with the pole just upstream of the ryepeck, turns to face the stern of the boat and punts back in the other direction, passing the ryepeck on the inside.

== Punting events ==
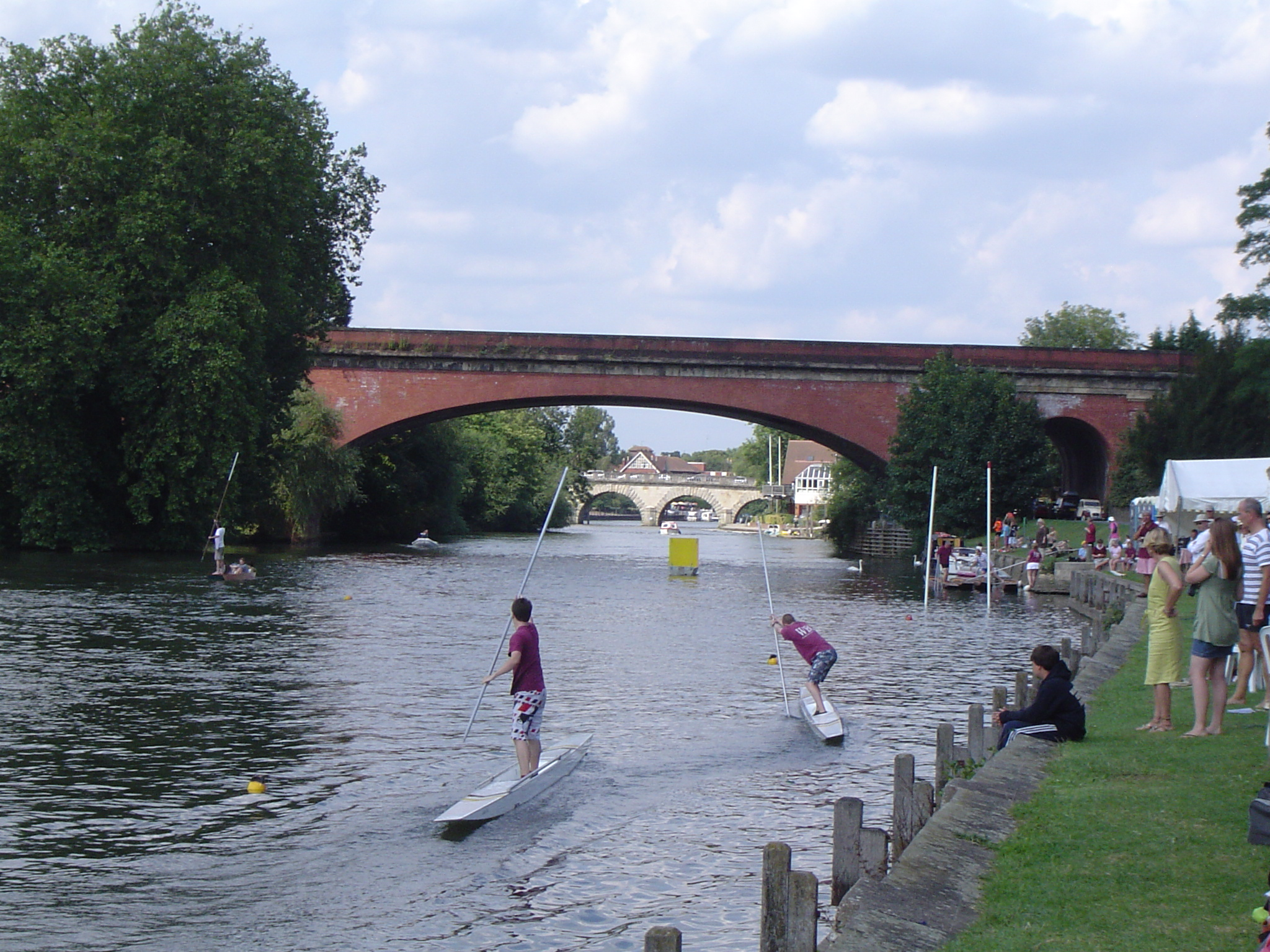
Best and Best punting event at the Thames Punting Championships

- Egham Regatta
- Sunbury Amateur Regatta
- Chertsey Regatta
- Hampton Court and Dittons Regatta
- Walton Reach Regatta
- The Thames Punting Championships (held at Maidenhead)
- Individual Club regattas

== Punting clubs ==
There are several English skiff and punting clubs on the Thames.

- The Skiff Club
- Thames Valley Skiff Club
- Wraysbury Skiff and Punting Club
- Dittons Skiff and Punting Club
- Wargrave Boating Club

All clubs also include participation in the partner traditional river sport – skiffing. Clubs also encourage youngsters to take part in punting, which may be easier for persons with a lower centre of gravity. Some clubs incorporate dongola racing, dragon boat racing and canoeing.

== See also ==
- Punt (boat)
- Skiff Racing Association
