= Dittons Skiff and Punting Club =

English skiff and punting club

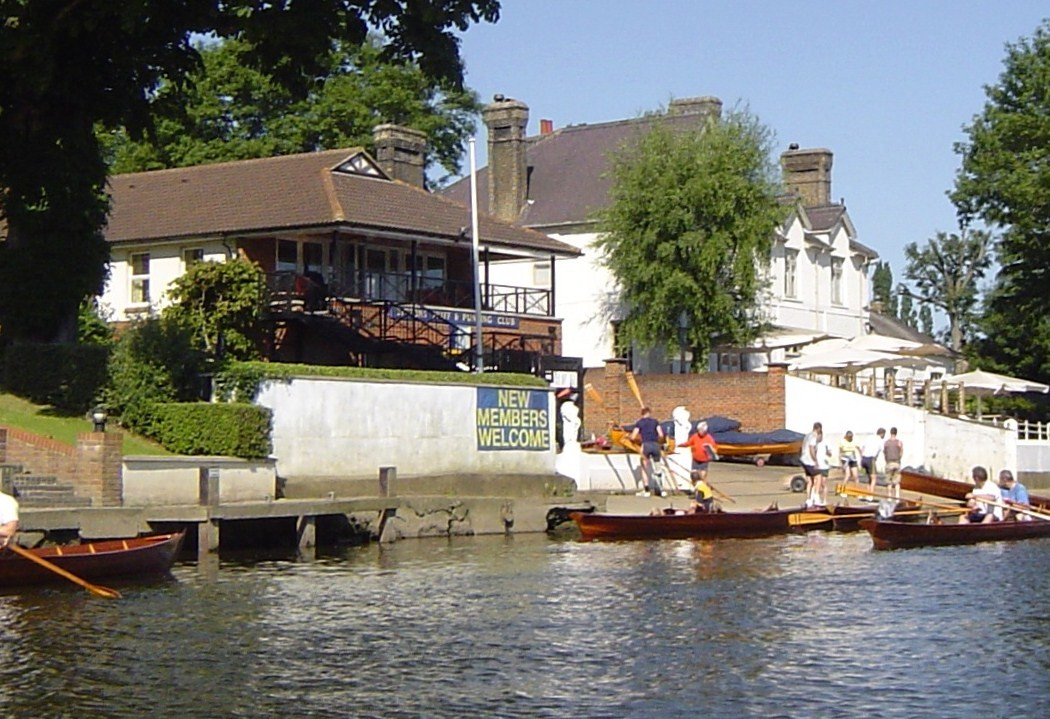

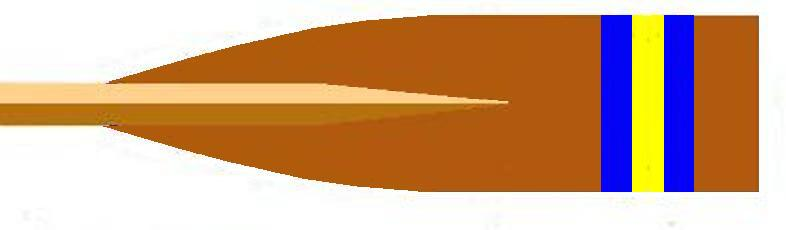
- Location: Thames Ditton
- Home water: Teddington Lock, River Thames
- Founded: 1923
- Affiliations: Skiff Racing Association
- Website: www.dittons.org.uk

Events
- Hampton Court and Dittons Regatta

Distinctions
- Guinness World Records

Notable members
- James Cracknell, Sarah Winckless, Mike Hart

Dittons Skiff and Punting Club (DSPC or Dittons) is an English skiff and punting club, which was founded in 1923. It is based on the River Thames with a club and boat house at Thames Ditton on the reach above Teddington Lock. As well as taking part in regular skiff and punt racing competitions, crews from the club have established several rowing world records.

The club supports two traditional water sports – skiffing and punting. Skiffs are traditional, stable wooden boats which are sculled with a pair of blades. Skiffs are raced at regattas run under the rules of the Skiff Racing Association, and are used for leisure outings such as Thames meanders. Punts are 2 ft and 1 ft racing punts. Punting is carried out competitively at regattas under the rules of the Thames Punting Club.

The club colours are blue and gold.

== History ==
The club was founded in 1923 following a meeting of interested persons in Long Ditton Parish Hall. The club operated initially from a site in Ferry Road Thames Ditton and leased single and double skiffs and a number of punts from Turks Boatyard.

In the early 1960s the club occupied Albany Cottage in Alexandra Road with a boatshed nearby.

In 1996 the area was redeveloped and the dilapidated buildings were replaced by a new purpose-built clubhouse and boatshed.

== Members ==
Several international and Olympic rowers have competed for the club including James Cracknell, Mike Hart, Sarah Winckless and Sally Andreae. The club provides support and coaching for all levels from beginner to advanced and has an active Junior section using rowing dinghies, skiffs and punts.

== Competition ==
DSPC hosts the 120-year-old Hampton Court and Dittons Regatta, and also organises a club regatta in September, the Tiny and Nancy Knight long-distance events and the Dittons Long Distance Singles event.

Each Saturday outside the regatta season, the club organizes a handicapped Bridge-to-Bridge (Hampton Court – Kingston Bridge) skiff race.

Club members have undertaken several rowing challenges to enter the Guinness World Records books. In 1988 a club crew established the record for rowing the length of the River Thames. This has been contested since and in 2004 a six-person crew regained the record. In the following year a club member set the record for a single scull the length of the Thames.

Other records achieved by the club include the record distance covered in rowing for 24 hours, and the record for rowing across the English Channel. Club members formed part of the joint skiff clubs team that set the record for rowing from London to Paris in 1996. The club represents Elmbridge in the Great River Race.

== See also ==
- Rowing on the River Thames
- Skiff Racing Association
