= Hampton Court and Dittons Regatta =

Regatta on the River Thames, England

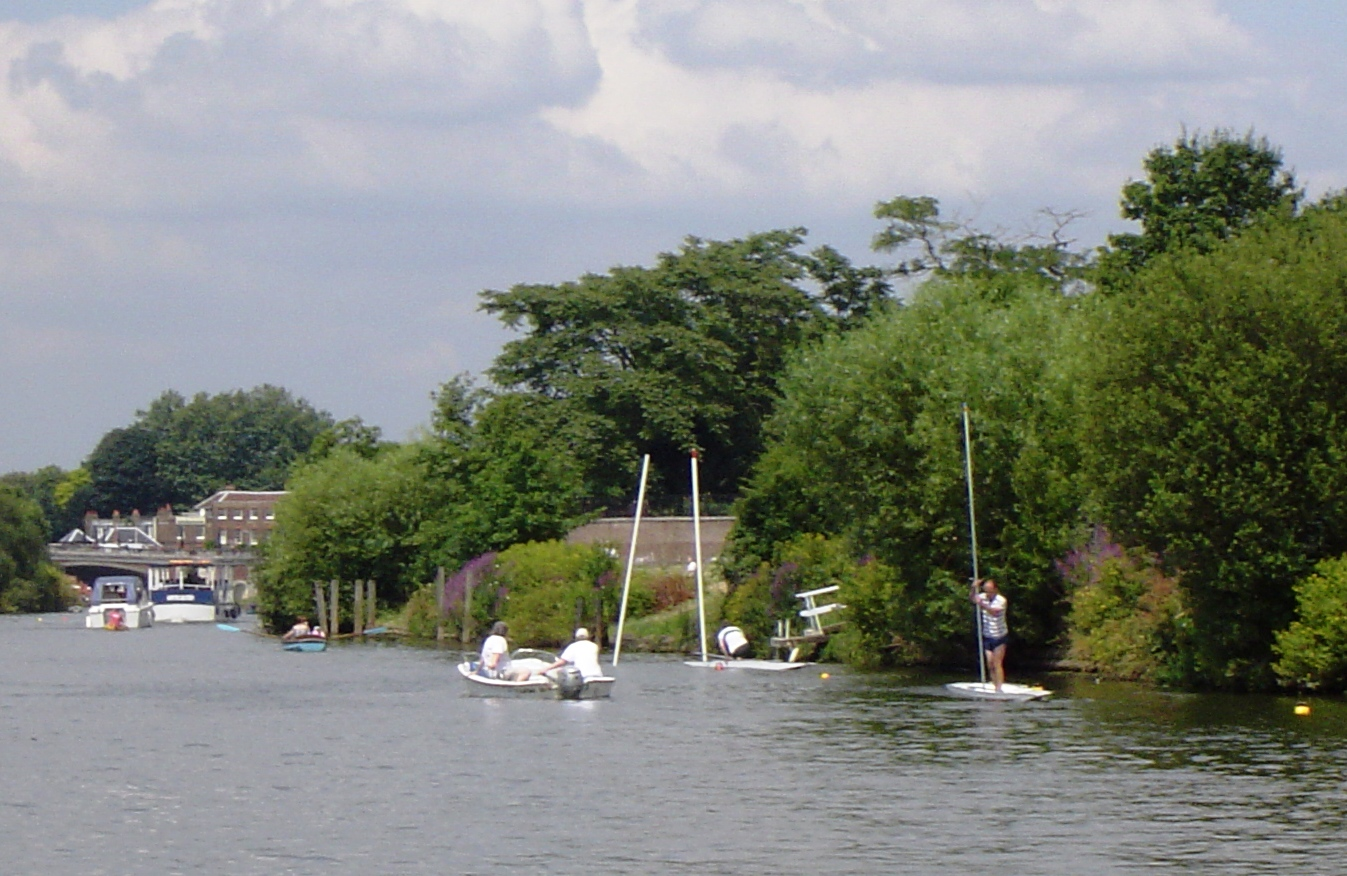
Best and best punt race with a competitor unboated at the rye peck turn

Hampton Court and Dittons Regatta is a regatta on the River Thames in England which takes place at Thames Ditton, Surrey beside Hampton Court Palace.

The regatta was inaugurated in 1887, being described as an "Aquatic Sports and Venetian Fete", although Alfred Sisley's painting illustrates a regatta in existence some thirteen years earlier at the same location. Pleasure boating on the River Thames between Teddington Lock and Molesey Lock had become extremely popular, and owners of self-propelled craft were interested in more sporting activity than just recreational boating, and competitors came from local sports clubs. The regatta was from the start under the royal patronage of Princess Frederica of Hanover who was then residing at Hampton Court Palace. The start point, then as now, was from the Hampton Court Palace Water Gallery, but finished then at the lower end of Boyle Farm Island.

The regatta has remained a traditional boat event, being a competition for skiffing and punting and is run from Dittons Skiff and Punting Club at Thames Ditton in July. Skiffing is run under the rules of the Skiff Racing Association and the course goes downstream from Hampton Court Palace Water Gallery to the clubhouse at Thames Ditton. Punting is run under the rules of the Thames Punting Club and the course is along the Hampton Court side on the opposite bank of the river from the clubhouse. Dongola racing and dinghy racing for juniors is also included in the regatta.

The regatta should not be confused with Thames Ditton Regatta which is a rowing regatta held at approximately the same location in May.

== Results 2019 ==
Hampton Court and Dittons Regatta took place on 20 July and scullers from Dittons Skiff and Punting Club won the following events: GSS - Russell Groom LSS - Siobhan O'Sulllivan MHD - Chez Fransella, Fabrice Gouttebroze, Patricia Cammack (cox) GIS - Ross Donnellan LES - Tuesday Manthorpe LED - Elly MacDonald, Tuesday Manthorpe, Anne Newman (cox) MVD - Deborah Charles, Chris Millward, Jai Patel (cox)

== Results 2018 ==
Hampton Court and Dittons Regatta took place on 21 July and scullers from Dittons Skiff and Punting Club won the following events: GHD - Andy Wells, Fabrice Gouttebroze, Patricia Cammack (cox) LSD - Natalie MacLean, Rebecca Hurley, Patricia Cammack (cox) LND - Pamela Hoad, Mandi Ronald, Ruth Knight (cox) GVS - Tim Tomlinson NJVD - John Roscoe, Nick Ronald, Sarah Duffy (cox)

== Results 2017 ==
Hampton Court and Dittons Regatta took place on 22 July and scullers from Dittons Skiff and Punting Club won the following events: Gents Senior Single - Robin Barwick Gents Novice Single - Andy Wells Gents Vet Double - Blu Laughland, Chris Millward, Lucy Richardson (cox) Mixed Senior Double - Siobhan O'Sullivan, Ross Donnellan, Patricia Cammack (cox) Mixed Higher Double - Lyssum Ross, Chris Millward, Maia Grace (cox) Gents Intermediate Double - Andy Wells, Fabrice Gouttebroze, Patricia Cammack (cox) U18 Mixed Double - Maia Grace, Daniel Cully, James Tyson (cox)

== See also ==
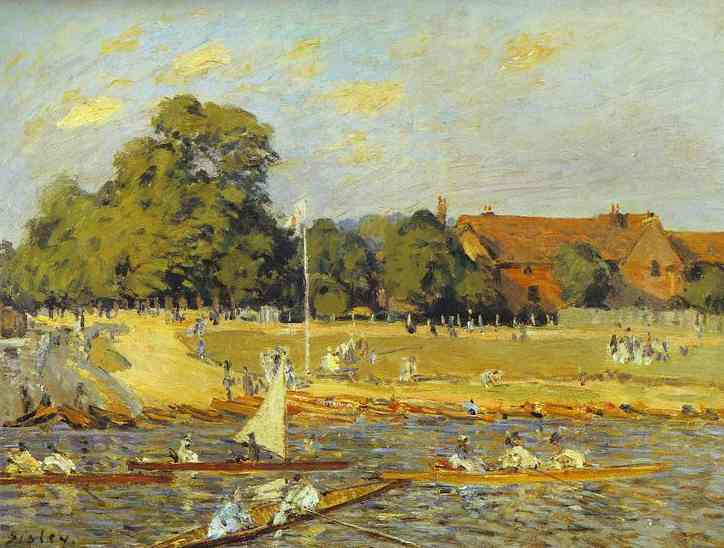
Alfred Sisley Regatta at Hampton Court 1874

- Rowing on the River Thames
