= Thames Ditton Regatta =

Rowing regatta in Surrey

Thames Ditton Regatta is a rowing regatta, on the River Thames in England which takes place at Thames Ditton, Surrey opposite Hampton Court Palace.

Thames Ditton Regatta was established in 1948, and is held annually in May. The regatta attracts top crews from schools, clubs and universities from around the UK, and over 250 entries are received each year. Racing takes place on the 1050 metre course that stretches alongside Hampton Court Palace and ends just downstream of the River Mole.

The regatta should not be confused with Hampton Court and Dittons Regatta which is a skiffing and punting regatta held at approximately the same location in July.

== See also ==
- Rowing on the River Thames
