= Mokoro =

Type of dugout canoe made from the sausage tree

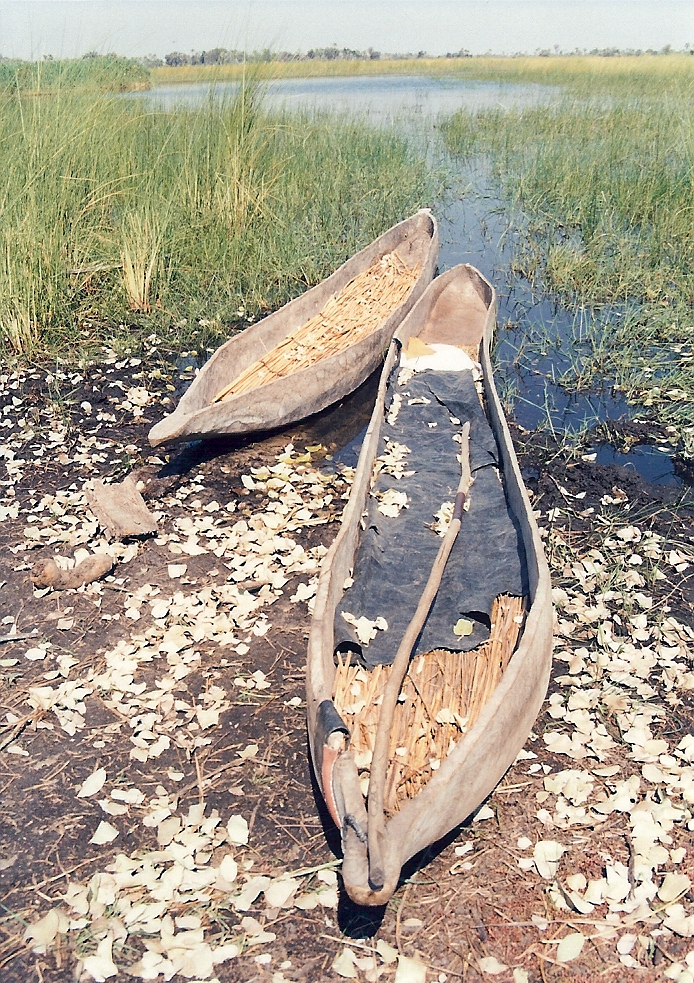
Two wooden mekoro

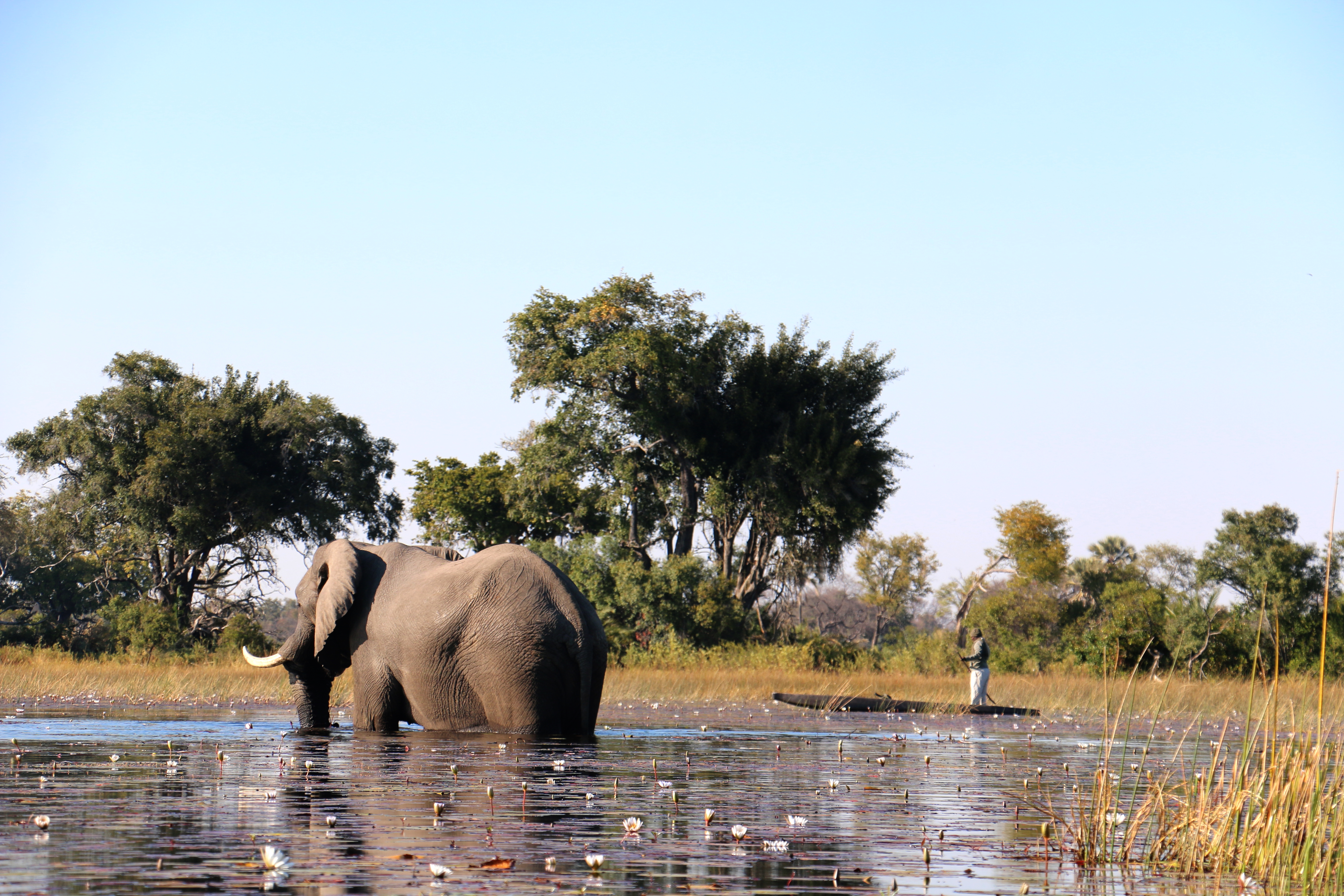
Travelling in a Mokoro (Okavangodelta 2017)

A mokoro (also spelled makoro, Tswana: [mʊˈkɔrɔ]) is a type of dugout canoe commonly used in the Okavango Delta and on the Chobe River in Botswana. It is propelled through the shallow waters of the delta or the river by standing in the stern and pushing against the riverbed with a pole, in the same manner as punting.

The plural in Setswana is mekoro.

Mokoro are traditionally made by digging out the trunk of a large straight tree, such as ebony and African sausage tree. Modern mokoros, however, are increasingly made of fiberglass, one of the advantages of which is the preservation of large trees. Mokoro safaris are a popular way for tourists to visit the delta and river, much of which is located in protected areas, but the boats are still a practical means of transport for local residents to use to move around the swamp. The boats are very vulnerable to attack by hippopotamus, which can overturn them with ease. Hippopotamus are reputed to have developed this behaviour because mokoros and other boats have been used for hunting.

== See also ==
- Dugout (boat)
