= The Skiff Club =

British rowing club

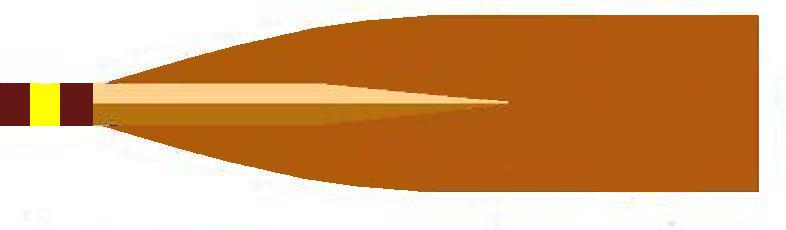
- Location: Teddington
- Home water: Teddington Lock
- Founded: 1895
- Affiliations: SRA, TPC
- Website: www.theskiffclub.org.uk

Events
- Gordon Dear Mixed Marathon The Skiff Club Regatta Teddington Head

Notable members
- Farn Carpmael, Peter H. Jackson, Jack Offer, Dick Offer, John Pinches, Jock Wishart, John Pritchard, Penny Chuter,

The Skiff Club is the oldest skiff and punting club in existence, having been founded in 1895. It is based on the River Thames in London, on the Middlesex bank between Teddington Lock and Kingston upon Thames.

The Club supports two traditional water sports - skiffing and punting. Skiffs are traditional, stable wooden boats which are sculled with a pair of blades. The Club uses skiffs for racing at regattas run under the rules of the Skiff Racing Association, and for leisure outings such as Thames meanders. Punting is also carried out competitively at the same regattas as skiffing under the rules of the Thames Punting Club, having access to one of the few surviving Victorian punting ledges on the Surrey bank of the Thames. The Skiff Club colours are chocolate (bronze) and gold. The Club organises a club regatta at the beginning of September, and also hosts the skiffing mixed doubles marathon in May. The Club also co-hosts the Teddington Head with Walbrook Rowing Club.

Over the years, club members have competed in rowing at international level. Members have also participated in long-distance rowing challenge events. The club provides support and coaching for all levels from beginner to advanced.

The Club is co-located at Trowlock Island in Teddington with Walbrook Rowing Club, Royal Canoe Club and Kingston Royals Dragon Boat Racing Club.

== History ==
The Skiff Club was initially based at the Albany Club in Kingston and in 1897 took the Turk's Albany Boathouse which was vacated by the Royal Canoe Club that year. By 1972 the waterfront conditions had deteriorated, and for this and other reasons the Club took up the offer of Twickenham Rowing Club of accommodation on Eel Pie Island. The Club left the island in 1988 and after a period located at Molesey Boat Club and Thames Tradesmen's Rowing Club at Barnes the Club settled at the present site on Trowlock Island in 1993. This had formerly been the Leisure Services site of BP which was acquired by pooling resources with the Royal Canoe Club and Walbrook Rowing Club.

== See also ==
- Rowing on the River Thames
- The Skiff Championships and Teddington Reach Regatta
- Skiffing
- Punting
- Skiff Racing Association
- Thames Punting Club
