= Thames Valley Skiff Club =

British rowing club

Coordinates: 51.3920°N 0.419957°W

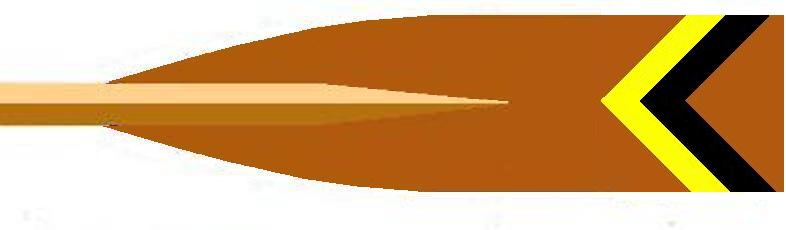
- Location: Walton on Thames
- Home water: Sunbury Lock
- Founded: 1923
- Membership: 132
- Affiliations: SRA & ARA
- Website: www.tvsc.co.uk/

Events
- Walton Reach Regatta, Skiff Marathons

Notable members
- Elise Laverick, John Stevens

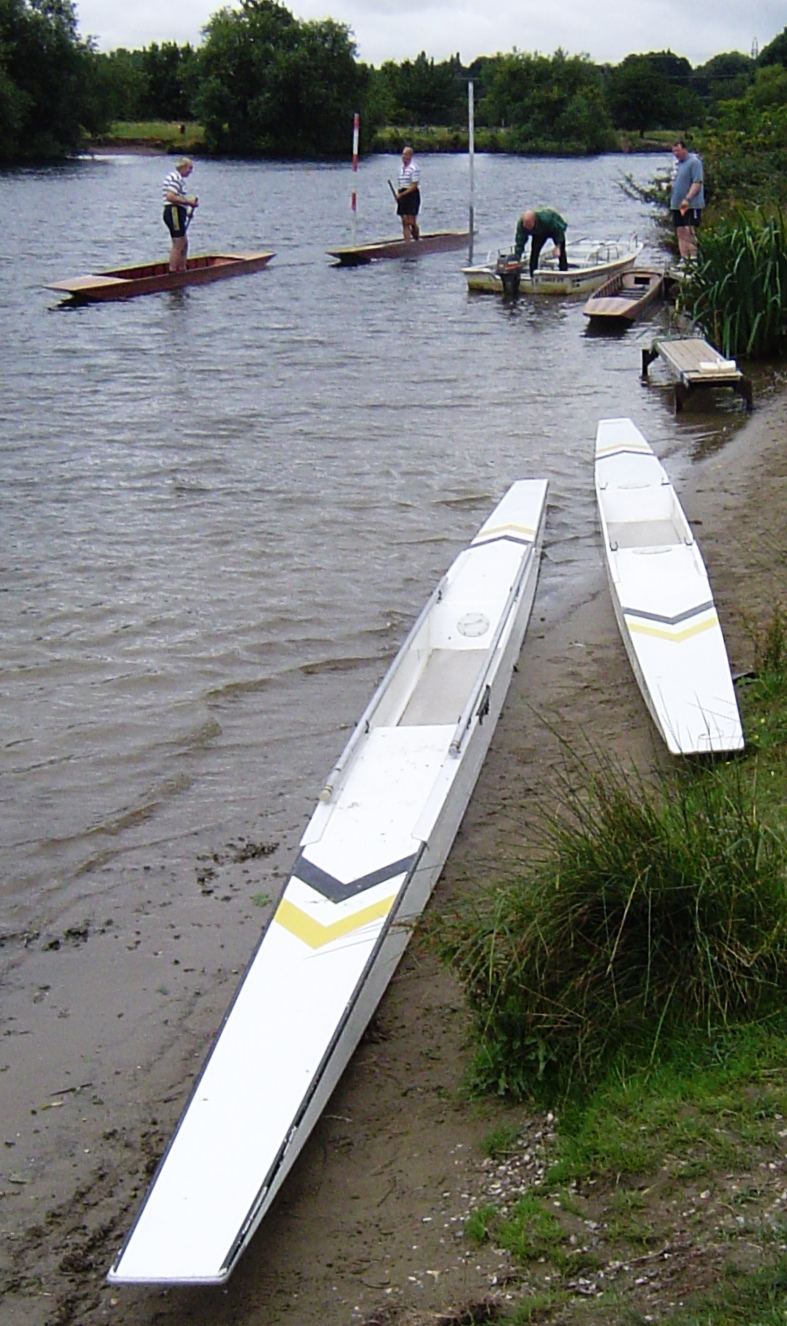
TVSC best and best punts at Chertsey Regatta

Thames Valley Skiff Club is an English skiff and punting club, which was founded in 1923. It is based on the River Thames in England, on the Surrey bank between Sunbury Lock and Walton on Thames.

The club supports two traditional water sports - skiffing and punting. Skiffs are traditional, stable wooden boats which are sculled with a pair of blades. Punts are 2 ft and 1 ft (Best and Best) racing punts. Punting is carried out competitively at regattas under the rules of the Thames Punting Association. Skiffs are raced at regattas run under the rules of the Skiff Racing Association, and are used for leisure outings such as Thames meanders. The club colours are yellow and black. The club organises a club regatta in July, and also hosts Walton Reach Regatta and the singles and doubles marathon events in October.

Over the years, club members have competed and won medals in rowing at the Olympic Games and other international level events. The club provides support and coaching for all levels from beginner to advanced.

The Club house is located at the end of Dudley Road in Walton and faces directly onto the river. The club originally boated from Rosewell's Boathouse at Walton Bridge and then to Clark's boathouse in Sunbury on Thames. After 1945 the club moved to the Anglers public house at Walton, before establishing its own boat and club house on a former UDC bathing place. The club has close historical links with Walton Rowing Club close by.

== See also ==
- Rowing on the River Thames
