= Weidling (boat) =

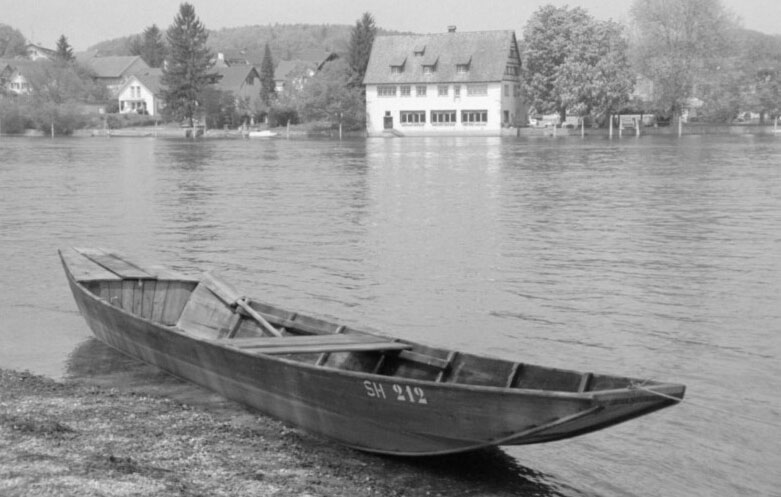
Typical Weidling made from wood, photographed at Scharen (TG) near Schaffhausen.

A Weidling is a flat-bottomed boat, with similarities to a punt. The weidling is traditionally constructed from solid wood, although today some boats are also made from plywood, plastic or aluminium. It is usually around 9 or 10 metres (30 or 33 ft) in length. A larger version is known as the Langschiff, and is up to 15 metres (49 ft) in length.

In the Middle Ages, the weidling was used for river transportation and fishing, and is depicted in contemporary works of art, including a set of altar panels by Hans Leu the Elder.

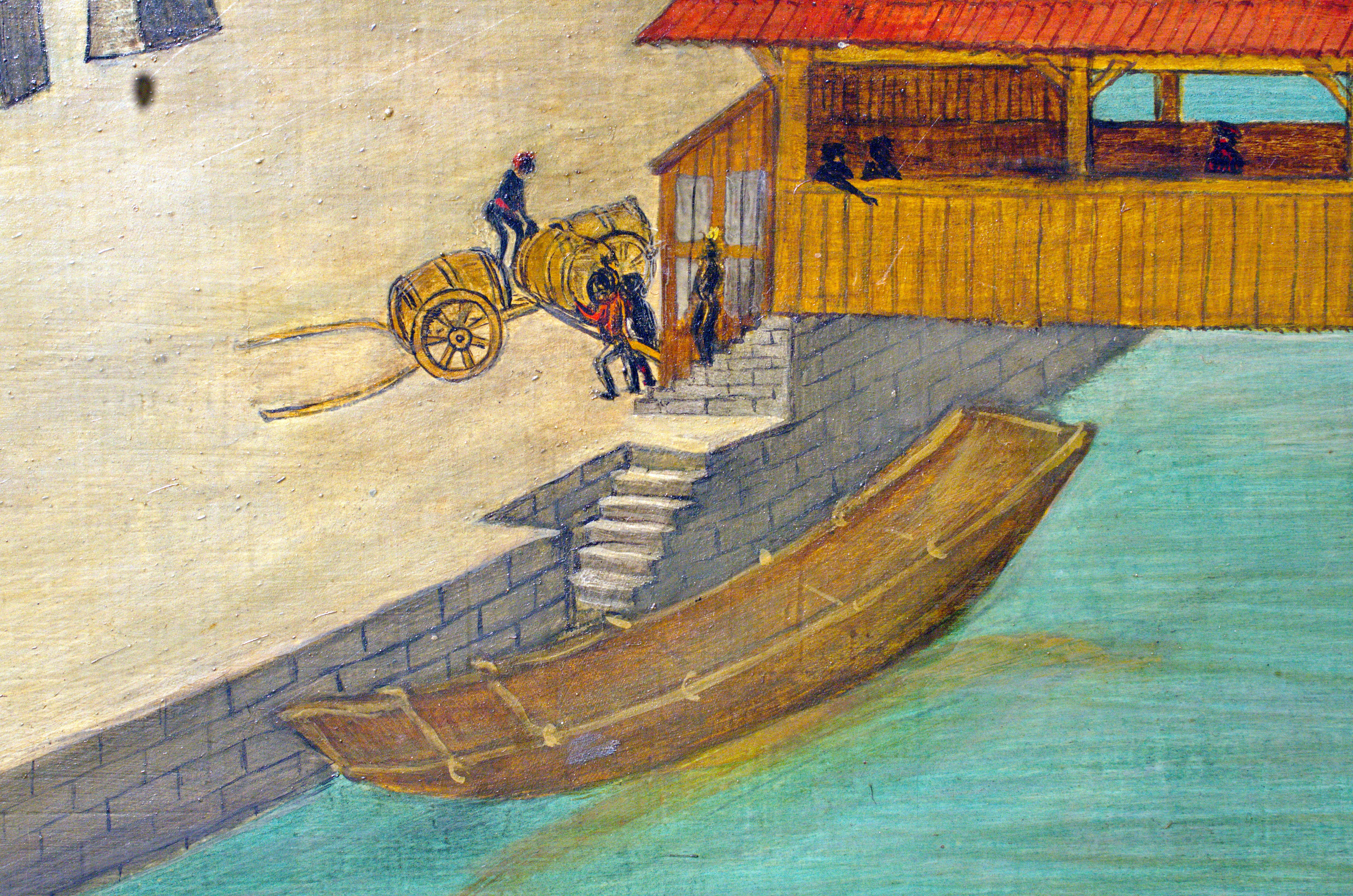
A weidling on the Limmat, circa 1500, as depicted by Hans Leu the Elder

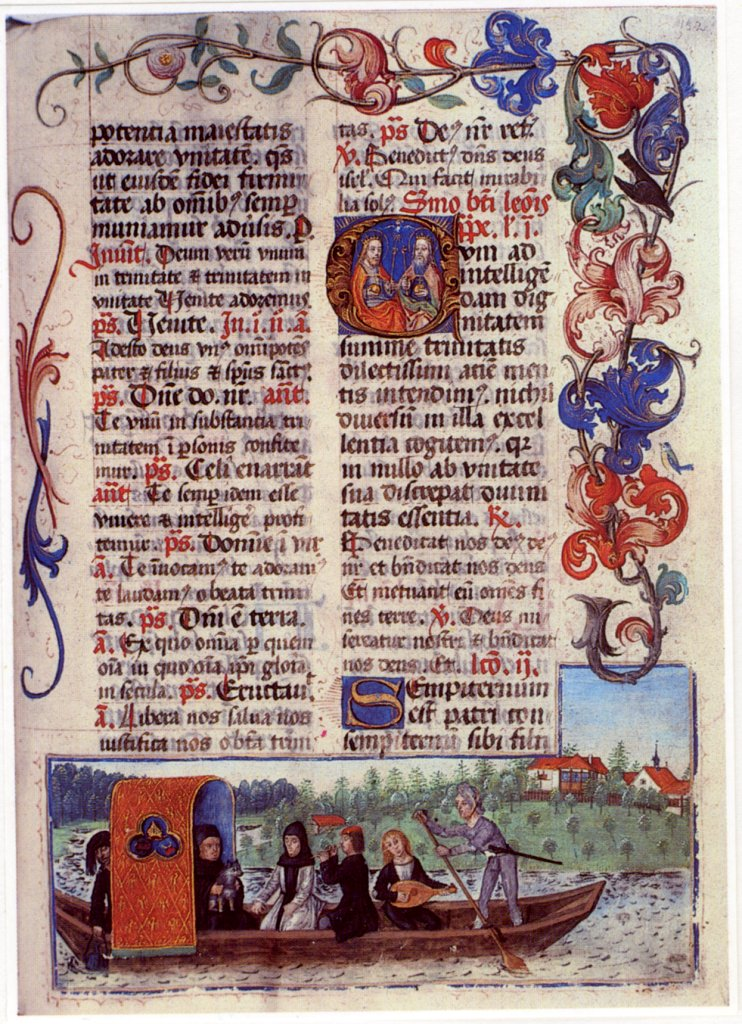
Abt Johannes Stantenat of Salem Abbey with monks and musicians on a boat trip on Bodensee.

Today, the boat is primarily used in Switzerland, on the Rhine and its tributaries, including the Aar and Limmat. It is used as a leisure and pleasure craft, and as a passenger ferry. The sport of Wasserfahren in Switzerland is conducted almost exclusively with weidlings.

In deep water, the weidling is traditionally propelled by one or two oars. In shallow areas, the boat can be poled along by one or two standing crew members. On waterways with suitable banks, the weidling can also be towed from shore. If the boat has a corresponding recess in the rear floor, it can also be equipped with an outboard motor.
