= Ryepeck =

Pole used to mark the ends of a punt race course

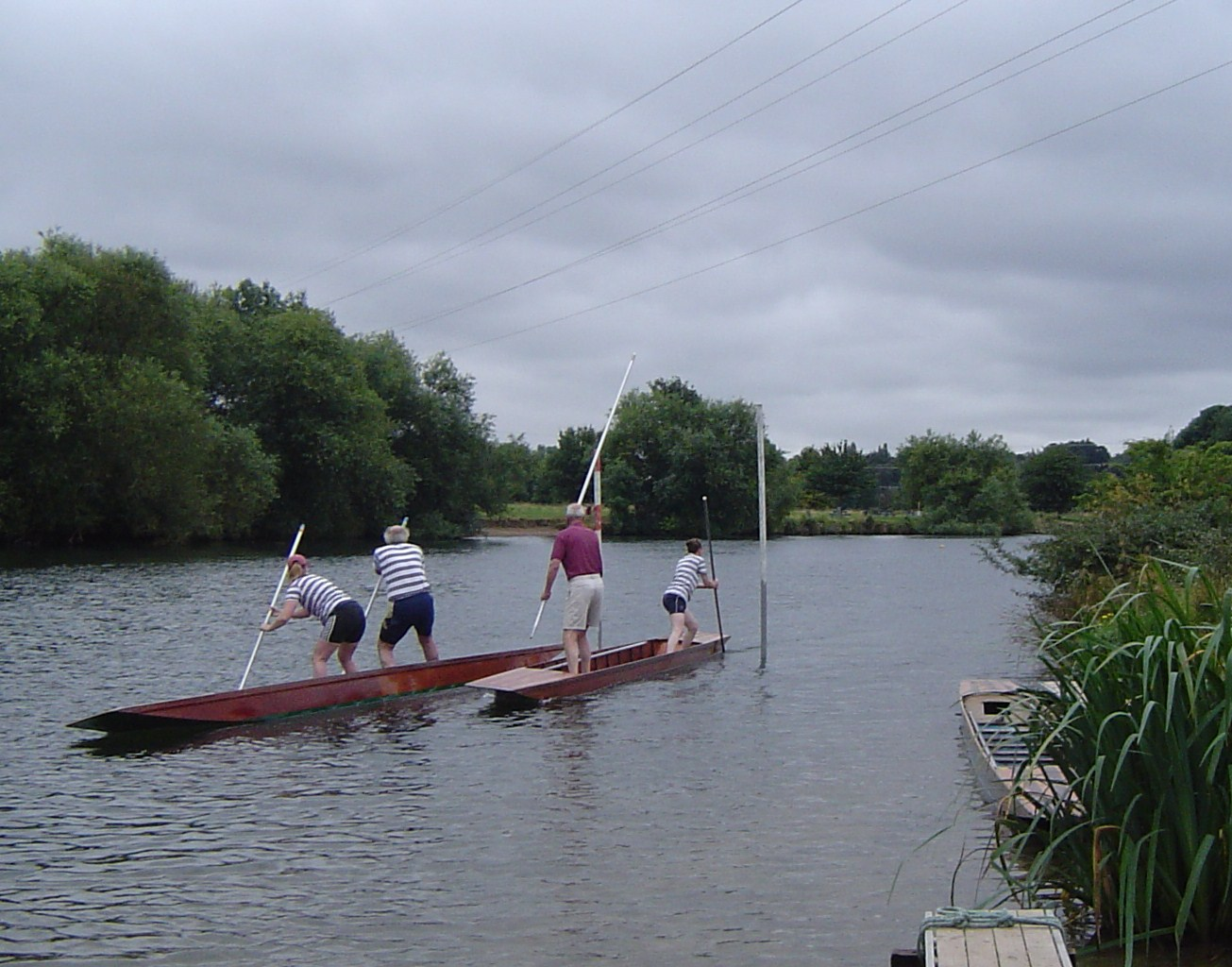
"Stopping up" at the rye-peck turn

A ryepeck (also rypeck and ripeck) is a pole used to mark the ends of a punt race course. For a description of racing in punts and the use of ryepecks, see Thames Punting Club.
