= Skiff Racing Association =

- Sport: Skiff racing
- Abbreviation: SRA
- Founded: 1901
- Affiliation: British Rowing
- President: Judy Graham

Official website
- www.skiffing.org.uk
- (United Kingdom)

The Skiff Racing Association (SRA) is the governing body in the United Kingdom for the sport of skiff racing. The SRA is affiliated to British Rowing. The objectives of the SRA are

(a) To maintain the standard of sculling in skiff and kindred races
(b) To promote the interests of skiff racing and kindred sports

== History ==
The SRA was founded on 6 February 1901 by delegates from a number of clubs and regattas under the leadership of F. S. Lowe. The SRA affiliated to the ARA (the predecessor of British Rowing) almost immediately. In the founding year there were eleven affiliations.

- Broxbourne Rowing Club
- Maidenhead Rowing Club
- Reading Rowing Club
- The Skiff Club
- Bourne End Regatta
- Cookham Regatta
- Sunbury Regatta
- Wargrave Regatta
- Windsor and Eton Regatta
- Teddington Reach Amateur Aquatic Sports
- Hampton Court and Dittons Amateur Aquatic Sports and Venetian Fete

The club and regatta affiliations have changed over the years with new clubs and regattas joining and old ones leaving.

== Constitution ==
The SRA publishes a handbook to ensure that a standard set of rules is applied for racing and boat construction.

The Association is run by a committee elected from the affiliated clubs and regattas at an annual meeting. A sub-committee deals specifically with the rules of racing and of the Association, and with the recruitment, training, testing and appointment of umpires for skiff racing. The rules of racing are based on those of British Rowing closely enough that BR qualified umpires may also umpire skiff races.

== Status system ==
The SRA operates a status system to allow scullers to compete with those of a similar standard. The status levels are (high to low) Senior, Higher, Intermediate, Novice and Entrant. When first starting skiff racing, competitors are Entrant status unless they have previously won a non-junior event under British Rowing rules. When competitors gain sufficient points, they are promoted to the next highest level. Competitors gain a full point by winning a qualifying race (a regatta race with more than 2 entries). There is also a classification for Veteran events (competitors aged over 40).

== SRA events ==
The SRA runs three events – the Inter-Club competition, and the Singles and Doubles Marathons. All other events are organised by affiliated clubs or regattas.

The Inter-Club competition has team awards for Gentleman's Singles (Lowe Cup), Gentlemen's Doubles (Davis Cup), Ladies Singles (Penny Chuter Cup) and Ladies Doubles (Churchill Cup). The Singles Marathon is competed for the Jack Rosewell Trophy, and the Doubles Marathon for the Heldmann Trophy.

In addition the SRA supervises the Ormiston Trophy which is awarded to the Club that wins the highest number of points in events each season, and the "Most Improved Skiffer" award.

== Current affiliated organisations ==
- The Skiff Club
- Thames Valley Skiff Club
- Wraysbury Skiff and Punting Club
- Dittons Skiff and Punting Club
- Wargrave Boating Club
- Granta Skiff Club
- Sunbury Skiff and Punting Club
- Egham Regatta
- Sunbury Amateur Regatta
- Chertsey Regatta
- Hampton Court and Dittons Regatta
- Skiff Championships Regatta (formerly Teddington Reach Regatta)
- Wraysbury and Old Windsor Regatta
- Walton Reach Regatta
