= Punt (boat) =

Flat-bottomed boat with square-cut bow

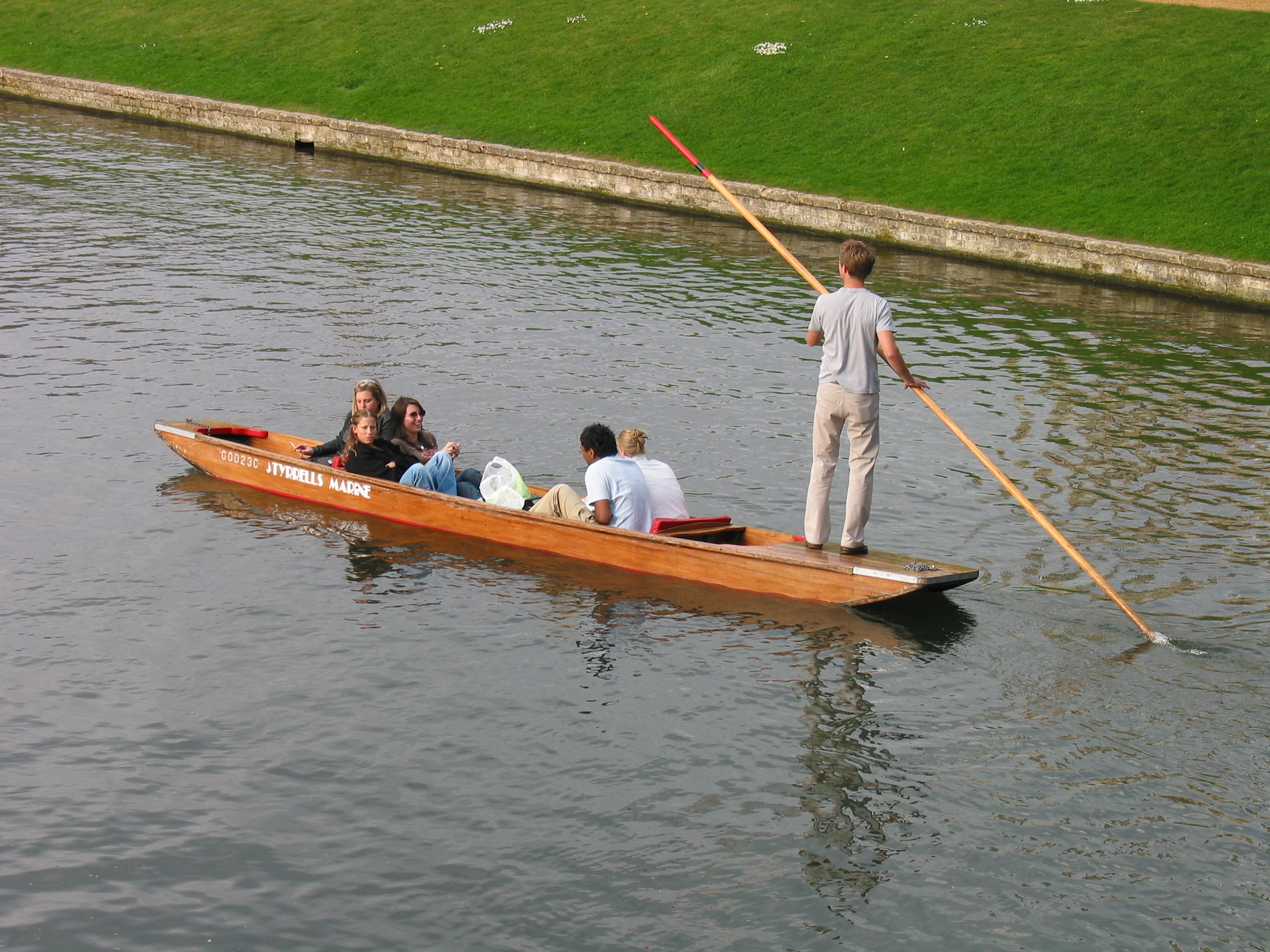
Punting on the River Cam in Cambridge, England

A punt is a flat-bottomed boat with a square-cut bow, designed for use in small rivers and shallow water. Punting is boating in a punt; the punter propels the punt by pushing against the river bed with a pole. Punts were originally built as cargo boats and as platforms for fowling and for fishing, such as angling; whereas now punting is boating for pleasure.

The term punt also refers to smaller versions of regional types of long shore work boats, such as the Deal galley punt, a square-sterned, lapstrake open-boat rigged with a single dipping lugsail, used for salvage and rescue work off a beach. In coastal communities, punt refers to any small clinker-built, open-stem, general-purpose boat. In Canada, the term punt refers to any small, flat-bottomed boat with a square-cut bow, regardless of navigational purpose, building material, or means of propulsion. In Australia, the term punt is used to refer to cable ferries. In Maine, Punt can be used interchangeably with dinghy.

== Construction ==
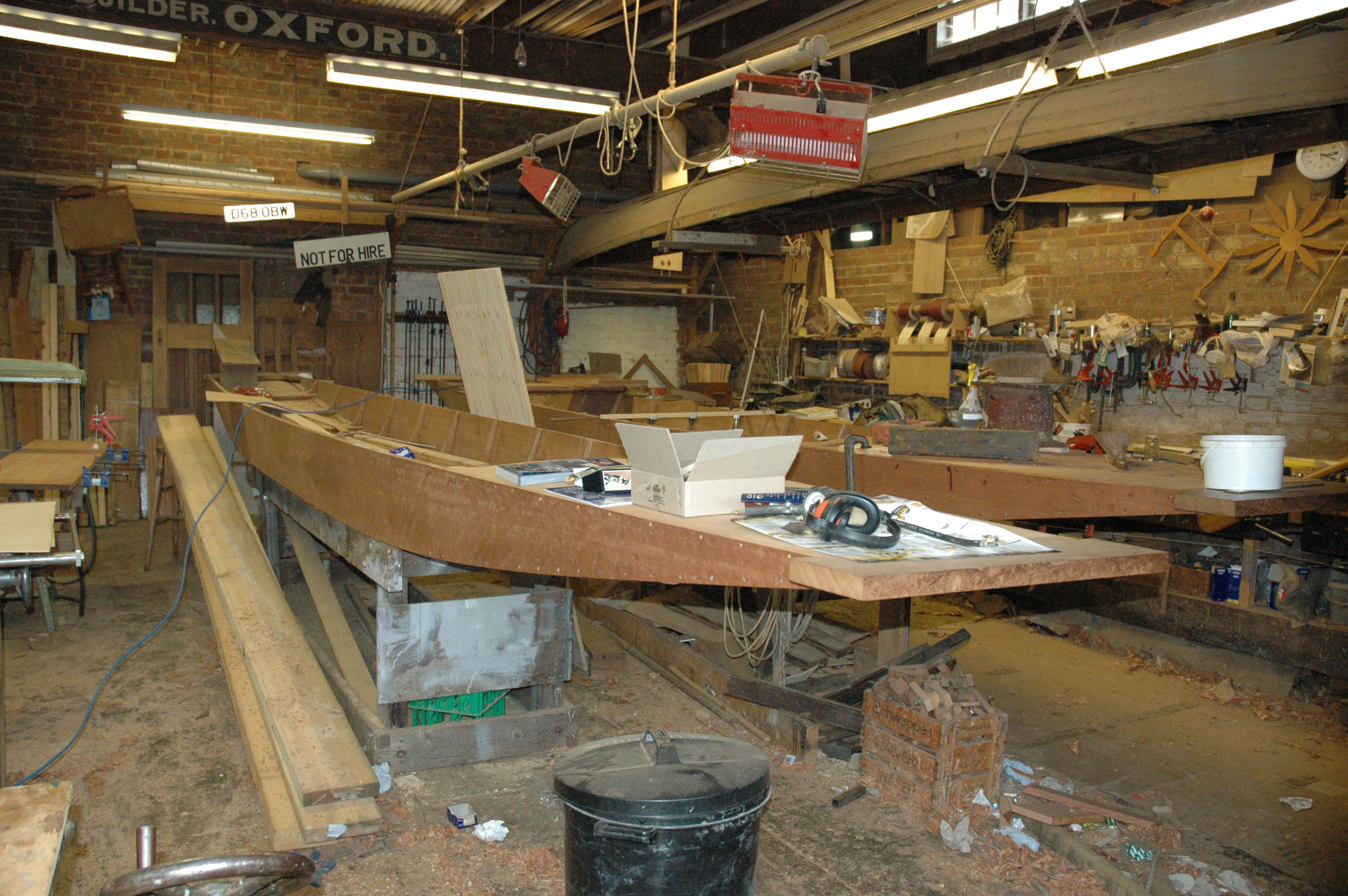
The Cherwell Boathouse, a punt builder's workshop in Oxford established in 1904

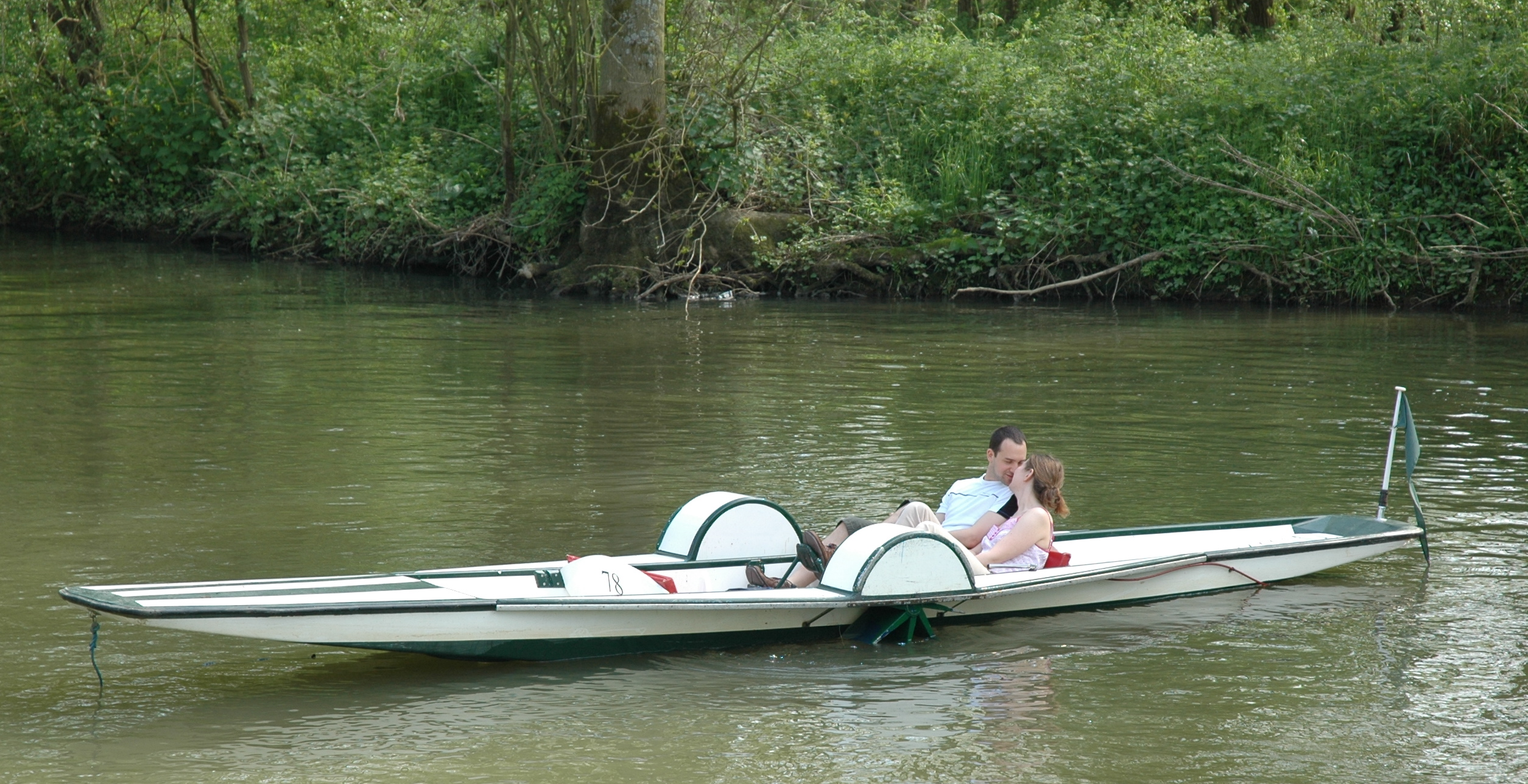
A Thames punt adapted as a pedalo

A traditional river punt is a wooden boat with no keel, stem or sternpost, and is constructed like a ladder. The main structure consists of two side-panels connected by a series of cross-planks called "treads", which are 4 inches (10 cm) wide and spaced about 1 foot (30 cm) apart. Because a punt has no keel, the draw of the boat is only a few inches even when fully laden, which makes the boat very manoeuvrable and suitable for shallow waters. A punt can be manoeuvred with equal facility in either direction, making it useful in narrow streams where turning the boat around may be difficult. The square-cut bow of the punt gives the boat greater carrying capacity for a given measure of length than a boat of the same beam with a narrow or pointed bow; the square-cut bow also makes the punt very stable, suitable for transporting passengers.

The first punts are associated with the River Thames in England and were built as small cargo boats and as platforms for fishermen. Pleasure punts, built specifically for recreation, became popular on the Thames between 1860 and 1880.

Some other boats have a similar shape to a traditional punt – for example the Optimist training dinghy or the air boats used in the Everglades – but the most similar boat is the European Weidling, a type of boat that can be tracked back to Celtic boats built more than 2,000 years ago.

Punts are still made in England to supply the tourist trade in Oxford and Cambridge or for racing purposes. The construction material of choice for most punts is wood. Fibreglass is used for some very light and narrow racing punts. The sides, the ends, known as "huffs", and the "till" are normally made of hardwood such as mahogany. The treads are often made from teak. The bottom is made of softwood and may be replaced several times during the life of a particular boat.

A traditional punt is about 24 feet (7.3 m) long and 3 feet (0.91 m) wide. The sides are about 18 inches (0.46 m) deep. Both the bow and the stern are cut square, with a long shallow "swim"; this is to say, the underside of the boat slopes very gently at the front and the back.

Both smaller and wider punts are made. Extra large and wide punts known as ferry punts may be seen in Cambridge, where many are used as water-borne tourist vehicles. Single seater Thames punts were normally made only 2 feet (61 cm) wide, and somewhat shorter than a standard punt; very few of these are still afloat. Racing punts, which are still used by a few specialist clubs on the lower Thames, may be built even narrower. Thames punts have occasionally been adapted for other means of propulsion: including sails, tow-ropes, and paddle wheels. With the addition of iron hoops and canvas awnings, punts have also been used for camping.

The bottom of the punt is made with long, narrow planks stretching fore and aft, attached to the flat sides and the treads. To allow the wood to swell when it gets wet, the planks are set a small distance apart (traditionally the width of an old penny, about 1–2 mm). The gaps are caulked; this caulking normally needs to be renewed annually. The treads are attached to the sides with small wooden "knees", which may be vertical or set at an angle. The gaps between the treads are normally fitted with gratings to allow the passengers to keep their feet dry. The seats are usually just a simple board fitting against blocks on the sides, with cushions.

A punt can be punted with equal facility in either direction, so it is not obvious to the novice which end is the bow and which the stern; however, one end of the boat is strengthened with a short deck, usually called a "counter" or a "till" (terms from cabinet making), that extends some six feet (1.8 m) from that end. The Thames punt-building tradition was that the end with the till was the stern, as shown in the diagram. The till provides some extra torsional rigidity, and is normally closed in; occasionally a locker may be built into it. A small minority of punts, such as those made from fibreglass at Magdalen College, Oxford have no single till in the usual sense, instead having very small tills at either end.

The forerunners of pleasure punts, fishing punts, usually had an additional compartment, called a "well," which extended across the width of the punt a little way in front of the till. This compartment was made water-tight, and had holes in the bottom or sides so that it could be flooded with water. It was used for keeping any caught fish.

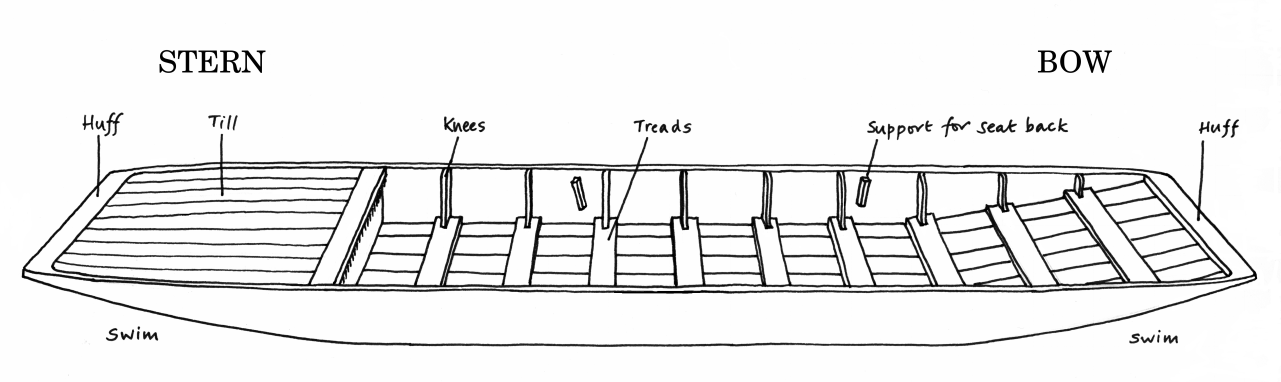
The construction of a River Thames pleasure punt without seating

== Punt poles ==
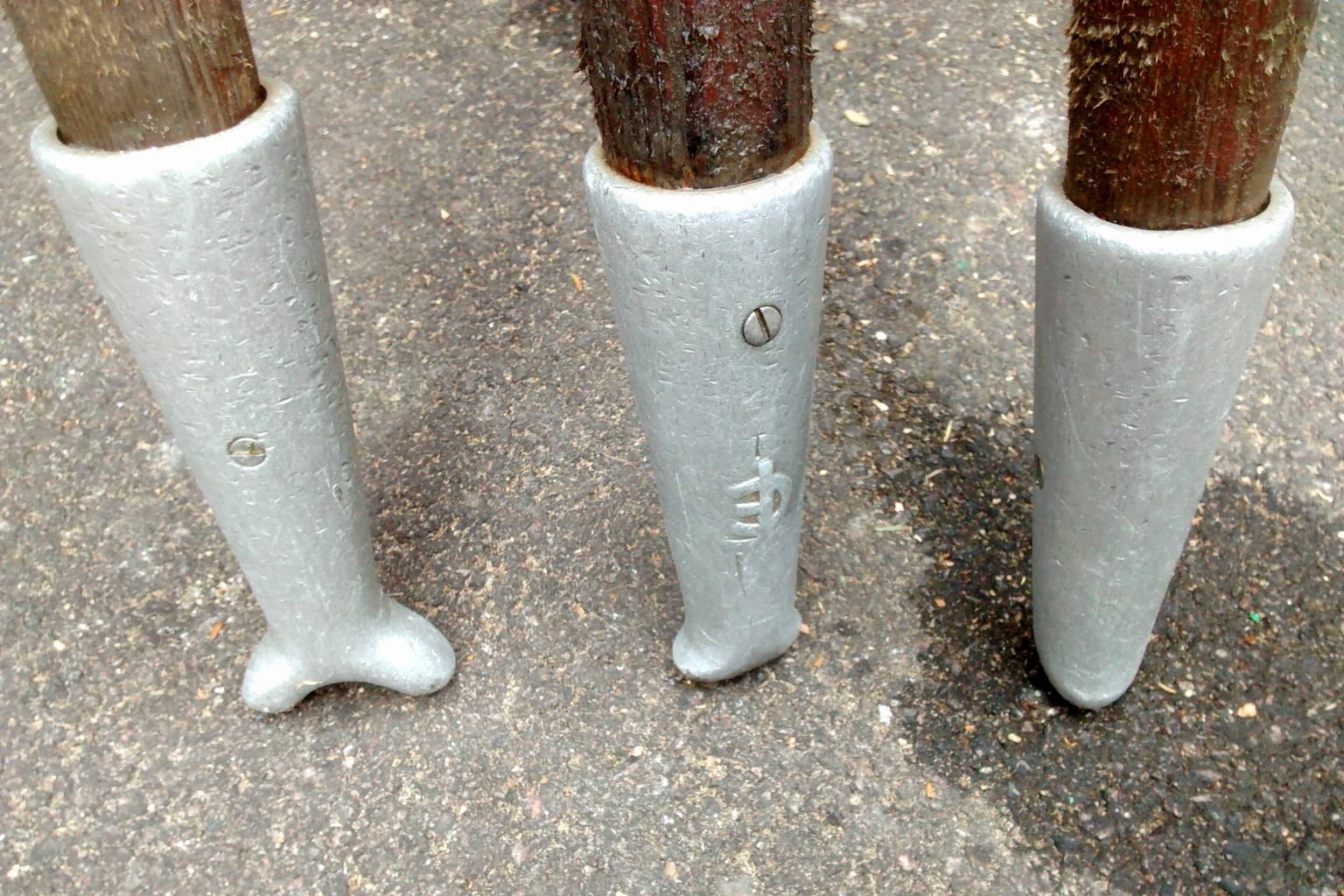
Three punt pole shoes of cast aluminium, with a screw into the wooden pole, swallow tail in varying states of wear

A traditional punt has no tiller nor any provision for oars, sails, or motor; instead it is propelled and directed with a pole. Poles for pleasure punts are normally made of spruce wood or aluminium alloy tube. A normal pole is about 12–16 feet (3.7–4.9 metres) long and weighs about 10 lb (5 kg). In both Oxford and Cambridge, long 16 ft (4.9 m) poles tend to be used exclusively. The bottom of the pole is fitted with a metal "shoe", a rounded lump of metal to protect the end – the shoe is sometimes made in the shape of a swallow tail.

Traditional wooden poles are preferred by many experienced punters; they are more sympathetic on the hands (at least when in good condition; a splintered surface is less so) and make less noise on contact with the river bottom or the punt compared with an aluminium pole. Aluminium poles are considerably cheaper and stronger, so may be preferred by punt stations offering punts for hire to inexperienced punters; however, it is normally possible to choose either type.

Racing poles are generally a great deal lighter than pleasure punt poles, and aluminium is the preferred material. It is usual to carry one or two spare poles in a race, so that one can keep punting if a pole gets stuck or is dropped.

A punt pole differs from the Fenland quant in that it does not have a cross piece at the top, and from the more generally used setting pole in that it only has a metal shoe on one end.

== Technique ==
Punting is not as easy as it looks. As in rowing, you soon learn how to get along and handle the craft, but it takes long practice before you can do this with dignity and without getting the water all up your sleeve.

— Jerome K. Jerome, Three Men in a Boat (1889)

The basic technique of punting is to shove the boat along with a pole by pushing directly on the bed of the river or lake. In the 1870s, when punting for pleasure first became popular, the normal approach was for the passengers to sit at the stern on cushions placed against the till, and for the punter to have the run of the rest of the boat. The punter started at the bow, planted the pole, and then walked towards the stern, shoving the punt forwards. This is known as "running" the punt. It was the normal technique used to move heavy fishing punts. As pleasure punts became lighter, it became more usual for the punter to stand still – normally towards the stern – while shoving. This is called "pricking" the punt. Pricking has the advantages that the punter is less likely to walk off the end of the punt inadvertently, and that more of the punt can be used to carry passengers.

For pleasure punting, the best way to learn is to start out in a boat with a competent punter to watch him or her at work. After this there is no substitute for extensive hands-on practice on different stretches of river. For racing punting it is best to join a club, and to work on one's balance. Some punt racers practise by punting in canoes.

One of the keys to punting well is that the steering is done during the stroke, rather than by using the pole as a paddle or rudder; steering in this way requires less physical effort if the punter stands in the centre of the boat (or at least as far forward as is compatible with not wetting the passengers). Once the punt is under way, it is easier to keep it in a straight line if the weight in the punt is all on the same side, to tilt the punt slightly and to form a keel. For racing, therefore, the leading foot is placed to one side against the "knee" that is at, or just forward of, the centre of the boat, and does not move from that position; only the rear foot moves during the stroke. For pleasure punting the precise stance does not matter so much; it is more important that the punter remains relaxed and does not shove too hard.

Two rather different traditions have grown up in Oxford and Cambridge: in Cambridge most punters stand on the till (the flat end) and punt with the open end forward, while in Oxford they stand inside the boat and punt with the till forward. Since the rivers in both cities are narrow and often crowded, the opportunities for punting "at full pressure" are rare and these variations in stance are of little practical importance. However, the Oxford river bottoms are generally muddier than in Cambridge, increasing the likelihood of the pole becoming stuck; the lower position, longer footway and greater grip offered by the open end is advantageous on such occasions. Students at Oxford and Cambridge frequently proclaim that theirs is the only correct style, to the extent that the till end is often known as the "Cambridge End", and the other as the "Oxford End".

=== For the beginner ===
Punting on the River Cherwell, under Magdalen Bridge in Oxford

Rivington recommends that the beginner should:

- Stand near the back of the punt (that is, on the "till" in Cambridge or on the "swim" in Oxford) and as near to the side as confidence and balance allow, facing over the side of the punt.
- With the forward hand throw the pole vertically down close to the side of the punt, guiding it with the lower hand.
- Let it fall all the way until it touches the bottom and then reach forward with both hands and gently push the pole past your chest. If you shove gently, you are less likely to steer wildly.
- At the end of the stroke, relax and allow the pole to float up like a rudder behind you.
- When the punt is going straight, recover the pole hand over hand until you can throw it down again and begin the next stroke.

The habit of relaxing at the end of the stroke helps to avoid falling in should the pole unexpectedly get stuck. When this happens, immediately attempt to twist the pole, and if this fails to free it rapidly, let it go and use the paddle to bring the punt back to it. Attempting to maintain a hold on a completely stuck pole is the most common cause of involuntary swimming as the punt will generally continue moving.

=== For the more experienced ===
More experienced punters steer during the stroke instead of using the pole as a rudder. To do this they stand further forward and keep to one side of the punt. To turn towards the side the punter is facing, the pole is thrown close to the punt and pulled towards the punter during the stroke (this is called "pinching" the punt); to turn the other way the pole is thrown slightly further out and the feet are pulled towards the pole (this is called "shoving around").

Some experienced punters punt one-handed. This technique is slower and harder to master than punting with both hands, and consists of a "bucket" recovery of the pole, where the pole is thrown forward rather than just pulled up, except that this recovery is done with one hand.

It is also feasible to punt one-handed while turning the punt pole over, in the manner of a paddle wheel. The advantage this gives the punter is that the pole can be dropped onto the river bed at an angle forward of the punter's position, while the momentum of the punt continues. When the pole comes vertical, pressure can be applied immediately to drive the punt forwards. This style of punting is particularly effective at providing power more continuously in fast-flowing streams or when the punt is moving quickly. This technique is more easily executed in shallow rivers.

Racing punters tend to stand in the middle of the punt, because it is more efficient to do so. Indeed, many racing punts have cross braces with canvas covers both fore and aft, so it is only possible to stand in the middle. Pleasure punters may like to try punting from the middle, but it is probably advisable to remove the seats and the passengers first.

It is also possible to punt tandem, that is with two punters standing one behind another in the middle of the boat, and generally punting from the same side. Some punt races are organised for pairs punting tandem.

== In England ==
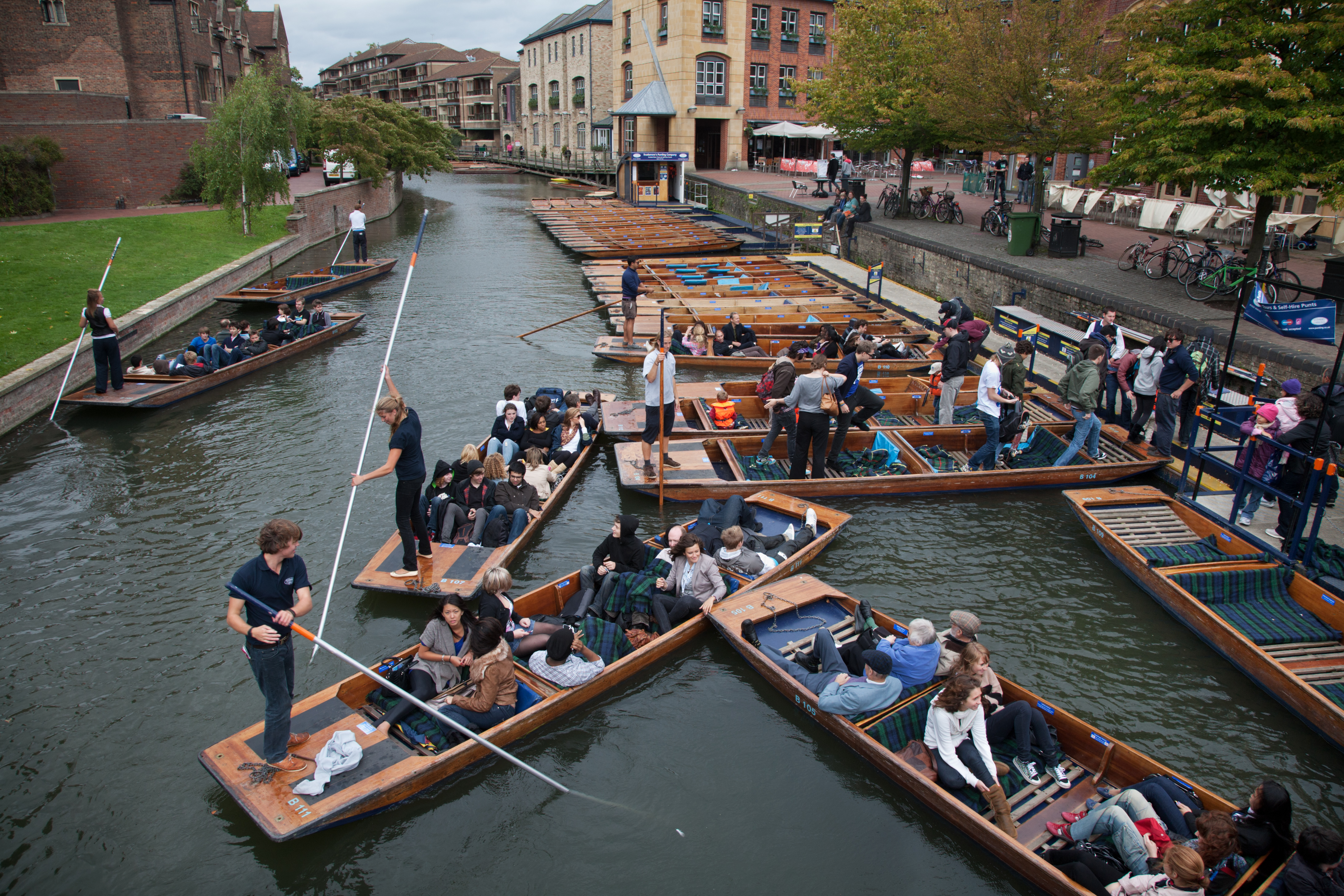
Punts and passengers in Cambridge, England

I admit that it is better fun to punt than to be punted, and ... a desire to have all the fun is nine-tenths of the law of chivalry.

— Dorothy L. Sayers, Gaudy Night (1935)

The pleasure punts in use in England today were first built around 1860, becoming increasingly popular in the early 1900s. The evidence indicates that pleasure punting initially started on the non-tidal Thames and quickly spread across the country. The first punting company (Scudamore's Punting Company) in the UK was founded in 1910. This company was bought out by a newer operation established in 1993 - who then changed their name to Scudamores and claim continuity with the older company.

Pleasure punting declined across much of England in the 1950s and 1960s in proportion to the increase in motor boat traffic on English rivers, but has since increased again as the tourist industry has grown in England.

Punting is a popular leisure activity on the rivers of several well-known tourist destinations: there are commercial organisations that offer punts for hire on the Avon in Bath, the Avon in Salisbury, the Cam in Cambridge, the Cherwell and Isis in Oxford, the Avon in Stratford-on-Avon, and on the lower Thames near Sunbury. A small number of private punts are also registered on these rivers, specifically by the colleges in Oxford and Cambridge, and most often by those colleges that lie along the river. In June 2012, Norwich City Council gave the go-ahead to introduce punting on the River Wensum.

=== Cambridge ===
Traditional River Thames pleasure punts were not introduced to Cambridge until about 1902–1904, but they rapidly became the most popular craft on the river, and today there are probably more punts on the Cam than on any other river in England. This is partly because the river is shallow and gravelly (at least along The Backs) which makes it ideal for punting, but mainly because the Cam goes through the heart of Cambridge and passes close to many attractive college buildings. The popularity of punting beside the old colleges in Cambridge can produce significant congestion on this relatively narrow stretch of the river during the peak tourist season, leading to frequent collisions between inexperienced punters. Further upstream, the river enters some particularly beautiful and tranquil countryside as it approaches the village of Grantchester.

A popular summer pastime for Cambridge students is to punt to Grantchester and back, stopping for lunch in a pleasant Grantchester pub. The Cam, on its upper reaches, is known as the River Granta. During tourist season, students have been known to steal the poles of tourist punts as they pass below the college bridges.

There are several companies on the Cam operating tours and hiring punts to visitors and, while most of the colleges along the river keep punts for the exclusive use of their students, at Trinity College the punts are also available for hire to the public.

The tradition in Cambridge is to punt from the till, locally known as the "deck", at the back of the punt. The advantages to this are that punters are less likely to drip on their passengers and can steer more easily by swinging the pole behind them, but it is not how Thames punts were traditionally propelled. Nor was the till originally designed for standing on; Cambridge-built punts are made with extra strong decks, and sometimes with a deck at both ends. Photographs of punting on the Backs in 1910 show that the practice was well established by then; according to Don Strange, an old Cambridge boat man interviewed in the 1970s, the practice was started by women from Girton anxious to show off their ankles.

From late in the 19th century until at least 1989, an undergraduate social club called the Damper Club (or Dampers Club after 1958), took a loose responsibility for the interests of punting on the Cam. Membership was open to "all those who have unwillingly entered the Cam fully clothed". The future Python Graham Chapman was president in 1961–62. The Dampers Club has been succeeded by the Cambridge University Punting Society, also known as "the Granta Rats", an undergraduate student society in the University of Cambridge, founded in 2010.

==== Cambridge towpath ====
Where the River Cam flows through the town in Cambridge, experienced punters follow the path of a gravel ridge that makes for easier punting. This ridge has a curious history. It is the remains of an old towpath built when the Cam was still used for commercial river traffic. The banks on either side of the river belong to various university colleges; faced with their combined opposition to a conventional towpath on one side or the other, the river tradesmen were forced to build the towpath in the course of the stream, and to make the tow horses wade along it.

==== Weir and slipway ====
The part of the Cam in Cambridge where punting normally occurs is separated into two levels by a weir at the Mill Pool near the University Centre. (Punting on the lower river below Jesus Lock is not normally allowed.) Punters wishing to move from one level to the other drag their punts between the levels via a slipway with rollers. Tourists wishing to visit only one level can hire punts at the appropriate level to avoid the transfer, which requires about four average adults. Most punt hirers only allow use of their punts on one level, and do not allow use of the rollers with their punts.

Punting in on the River Cam in Cambridge

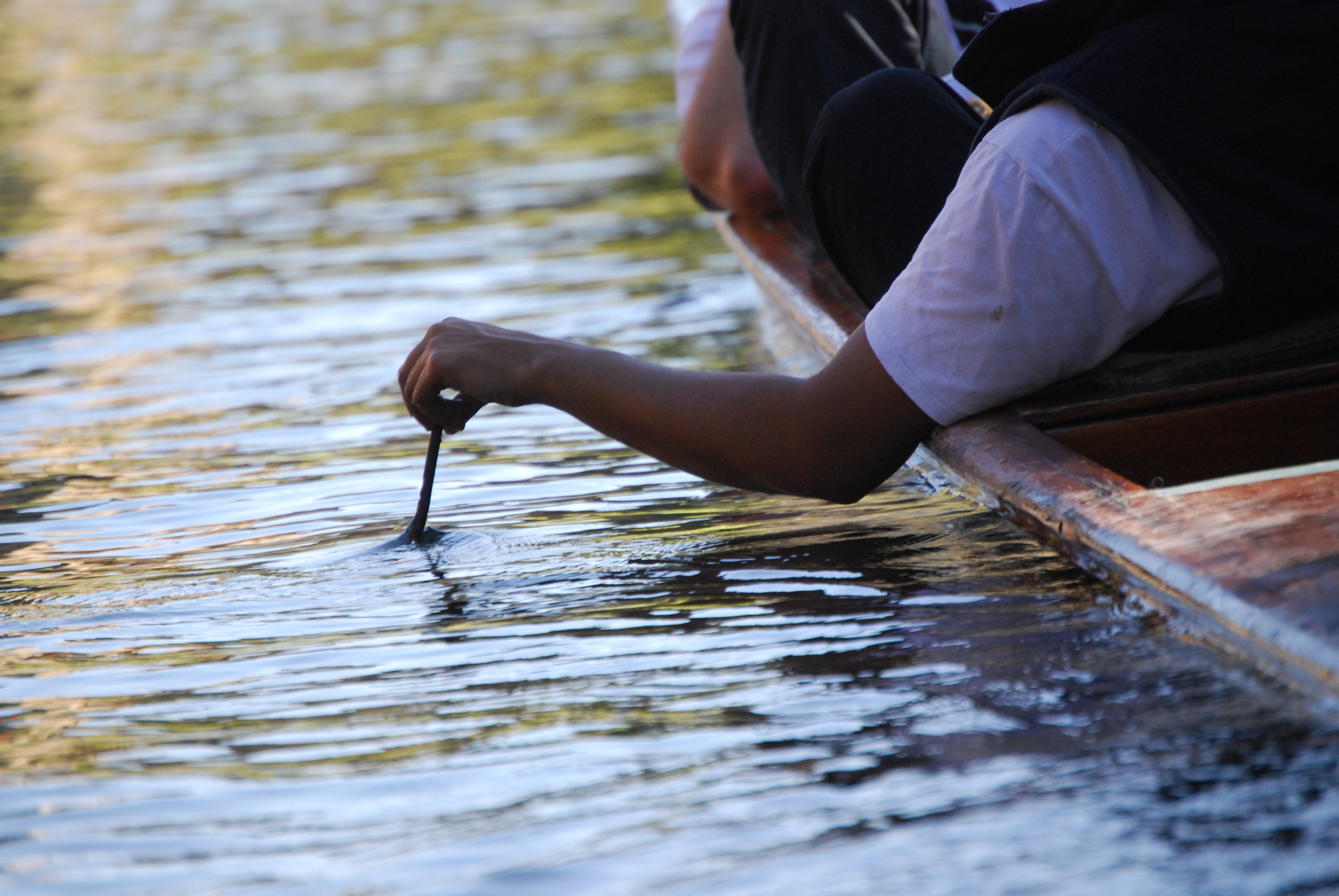
Summer on the Cam

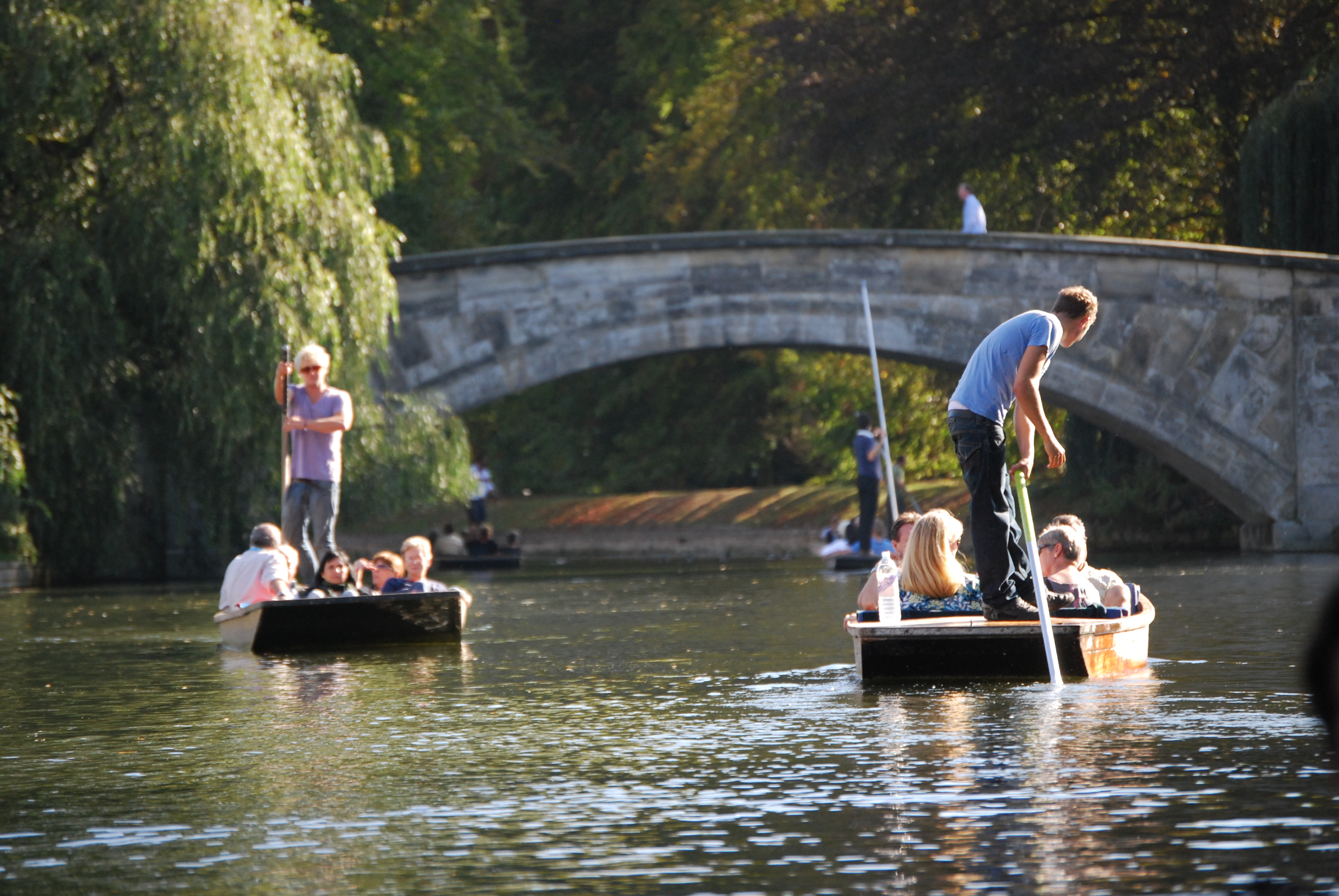
Punting in summer on the Cam

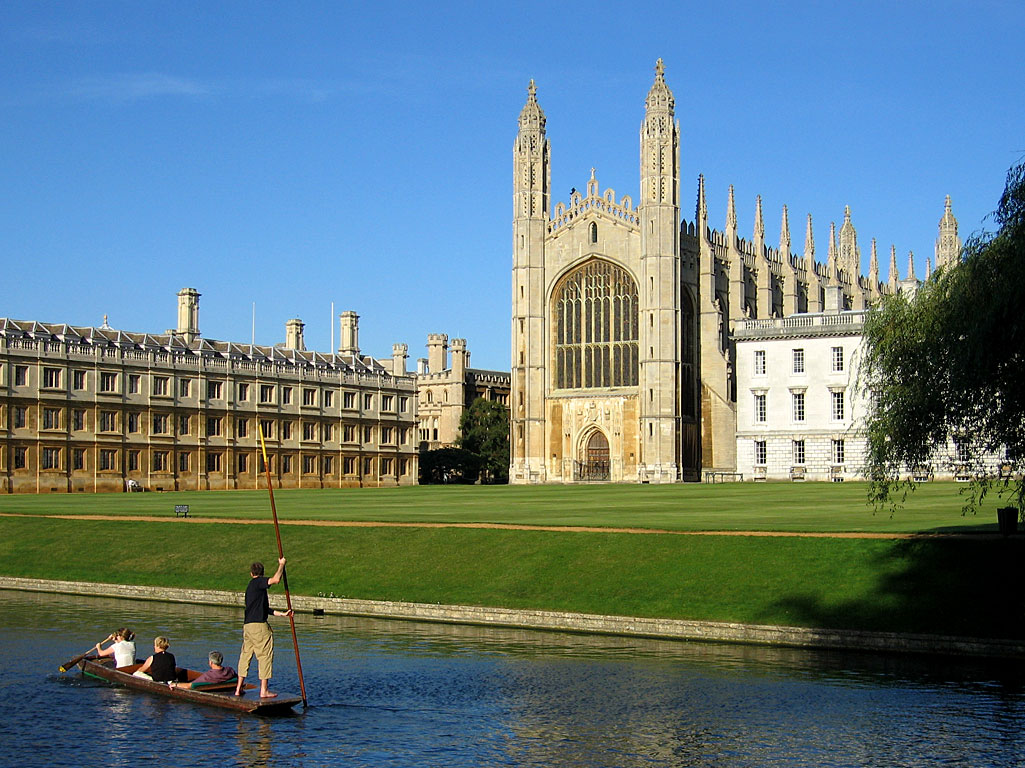
Cambridge punting technique

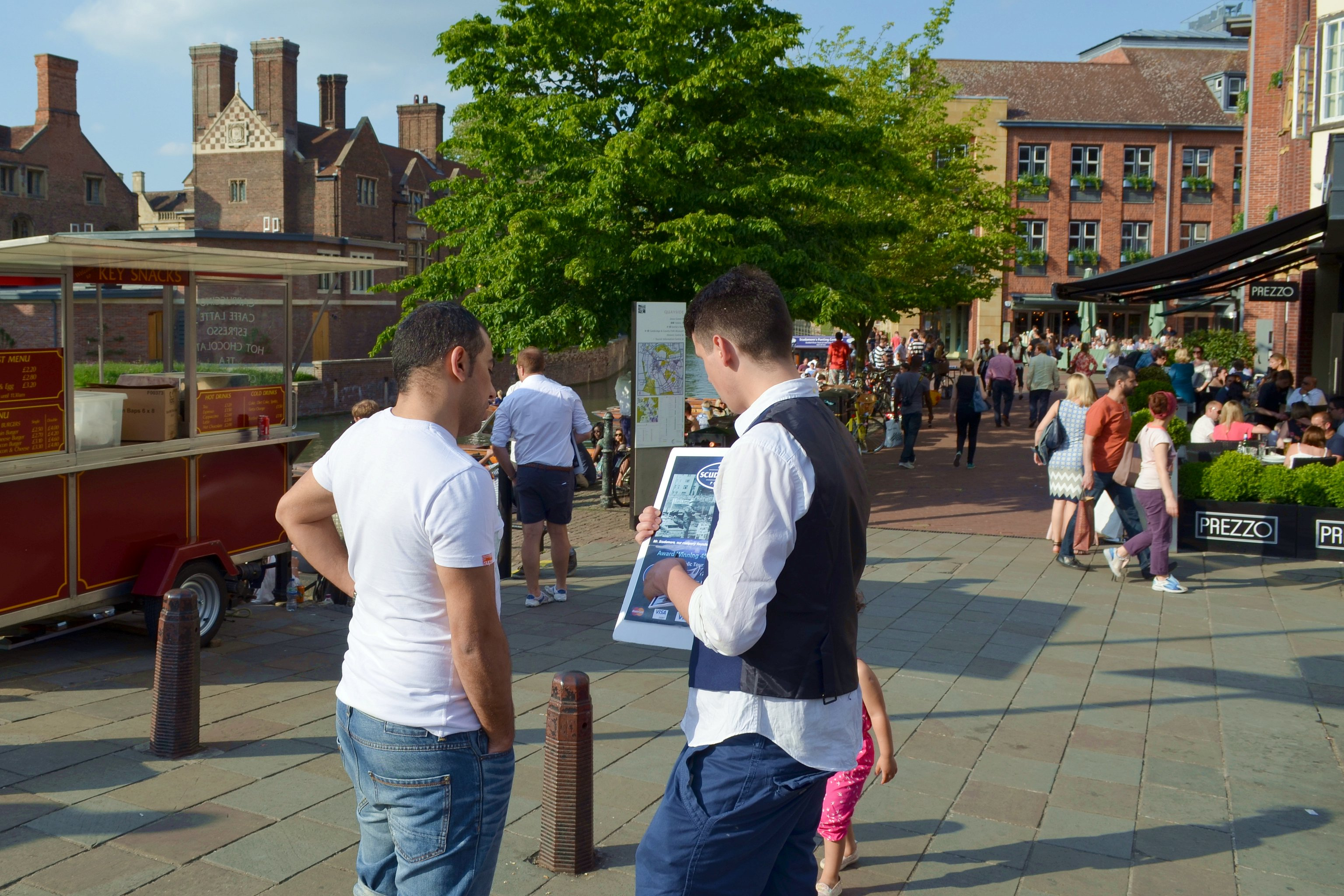
A punt tout with a prospective customer

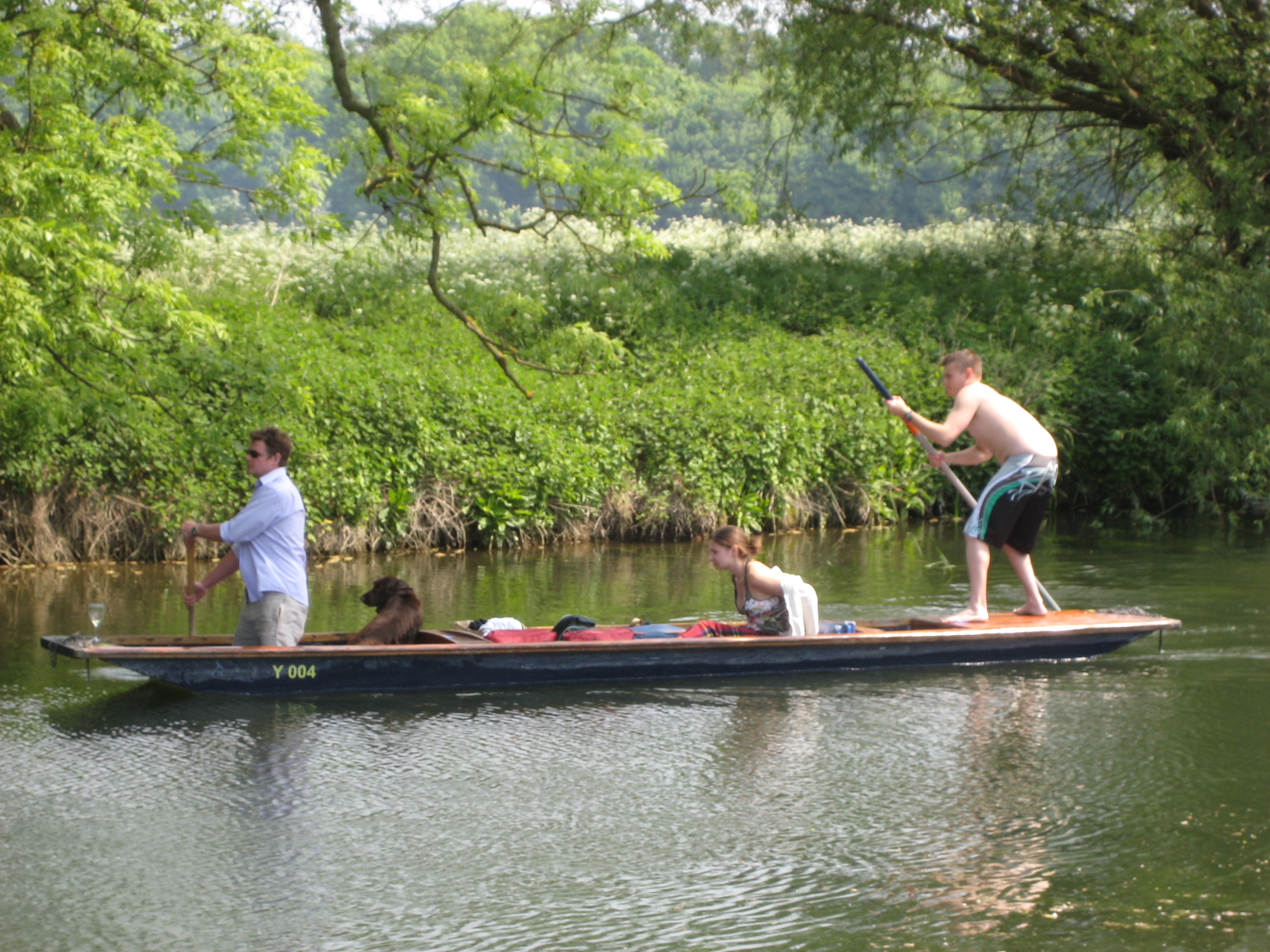
Less formal punting at Grantchester

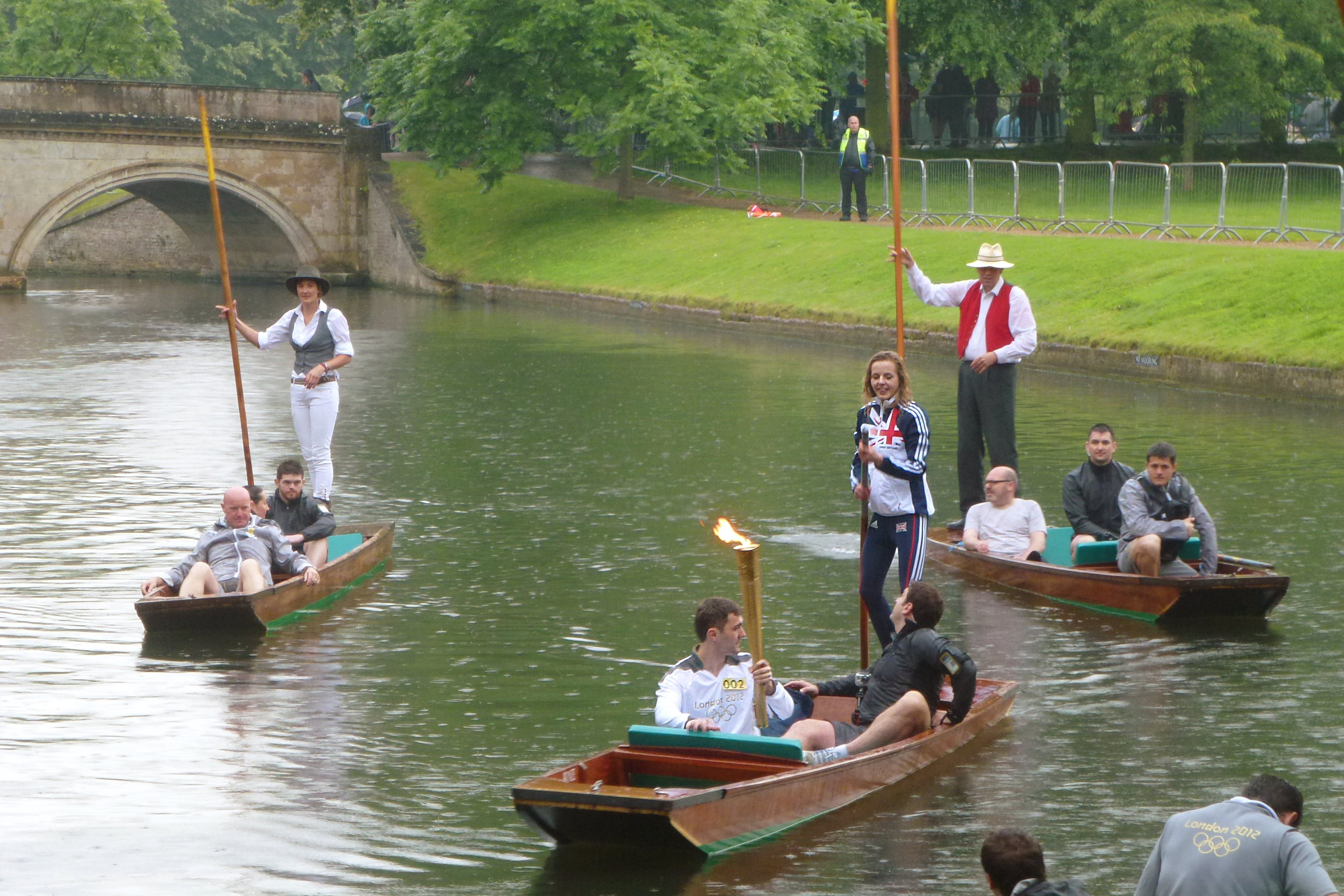
The Olympic torch being punted down the river during the 2012 Summer Olympics torch relay

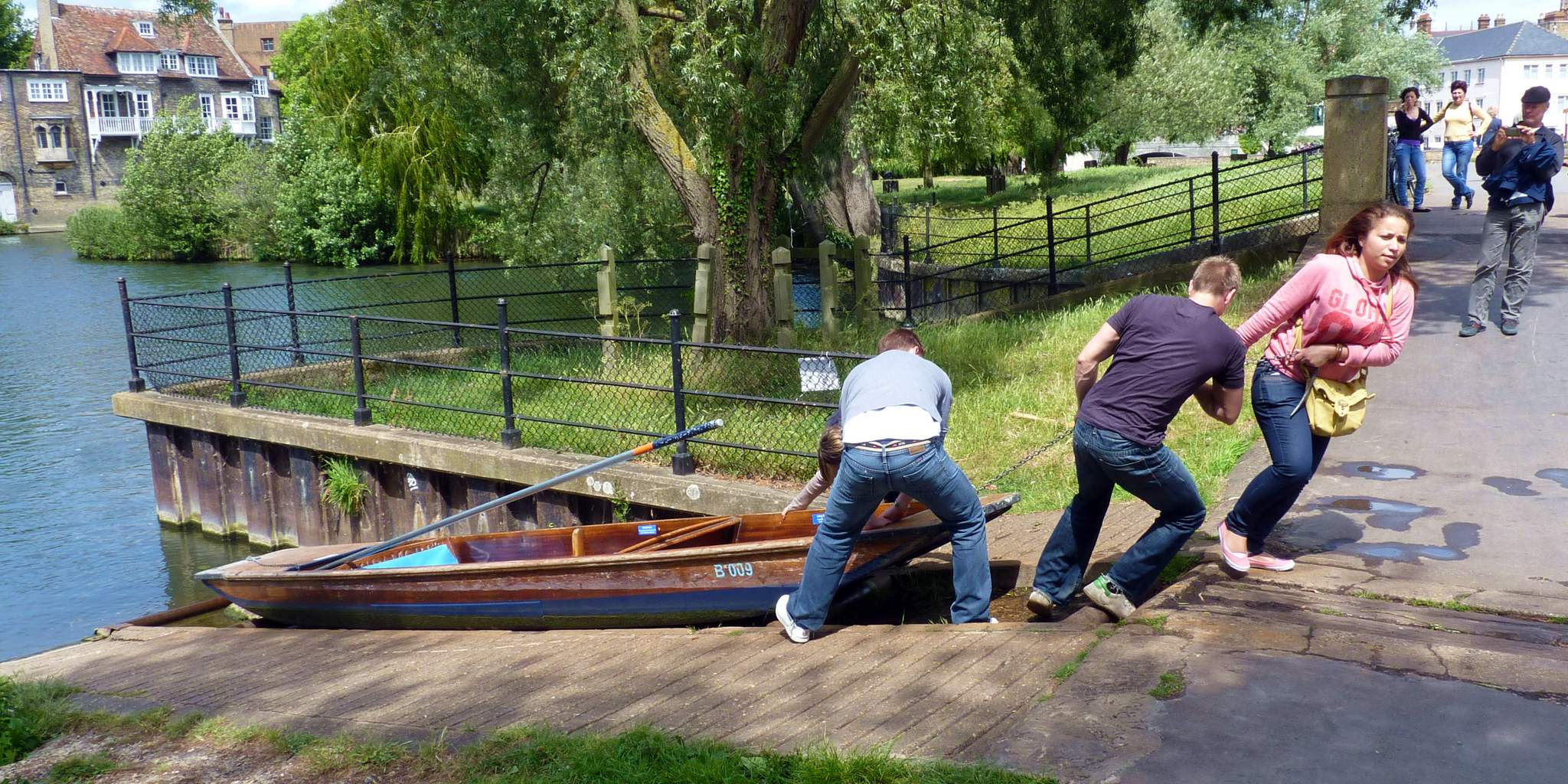
A punt being pulled up rollers between the upper and lower levels of the river

=== Oxford ===
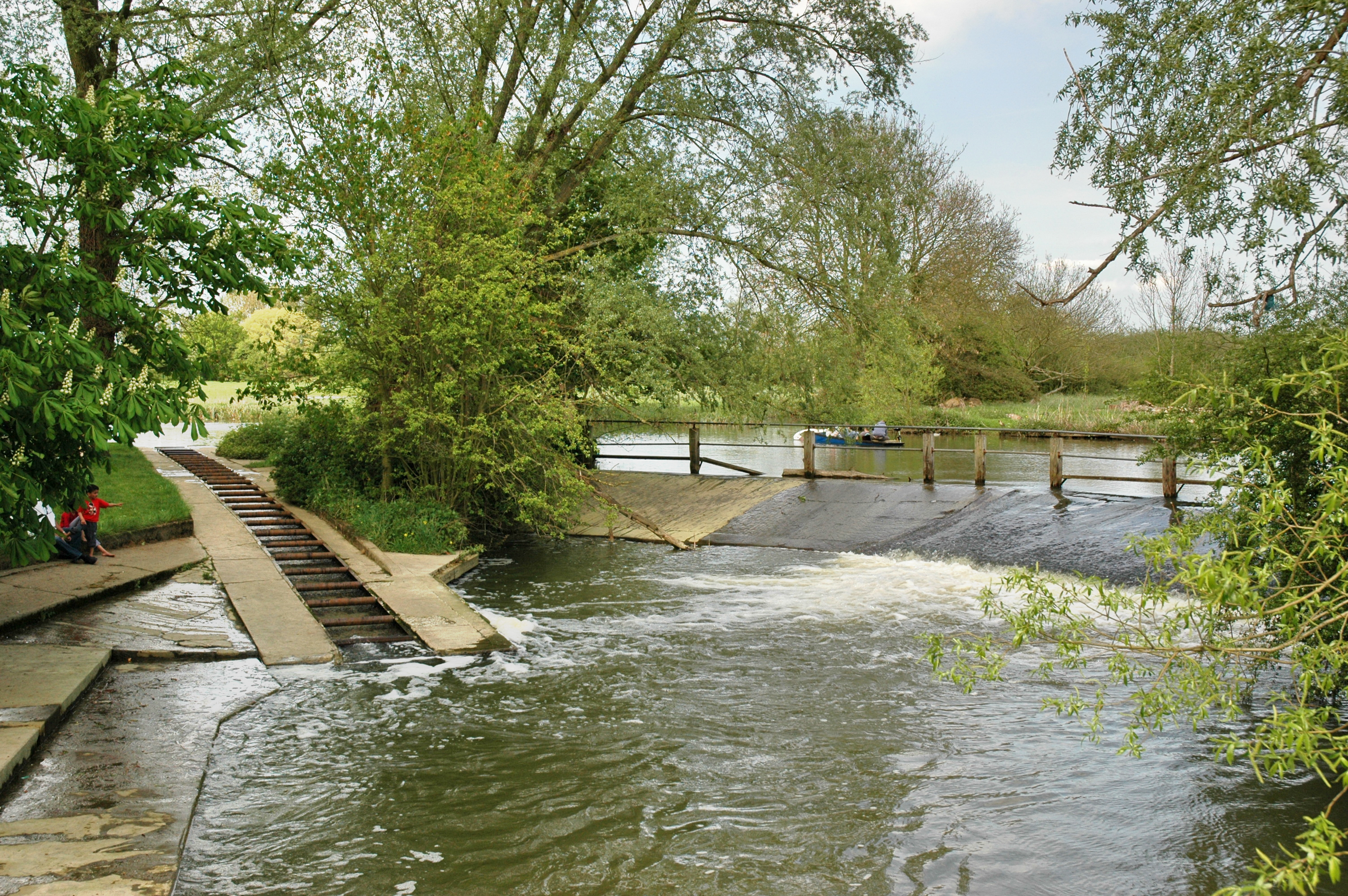
The punt rollers at "Mesopotamia" on the Cherwell

Except in the immediate vicinity of Magdalen Bridge, punting in Oxford is a surprisingly quiet and rural experience. Most of the punting is done on the River Cherwell, which flows through Oxford's protected green belt of fields and woods for the last few miles before it joins the Thames just south-east of Christ Church Meadow. Unfortunately this tranquillity comes at a price, for the Cherwell is both deep and muddy, and the muddy patches cling tenaciously to the pole's shoe at unexpected moments. The problem of poles getting stuck in the mud can be mitigated by twisting the pole at the end of a stroke, before trying to pull it out.

Punting on the Thames below Folly Bridge is often less enjoyable, mainly because of the competition from eights and sculls and motor boats; punts are recommended to keep close in beside the towpath. The best punting to be had in Oxford is on the Isis alongside Port Meadow to the west of the town; this stretch of river is both shallow and gravelly, has attractive scenery, and is well supplied with pubs (such as The Trout Inn in Wolvercote where some of the Inspector Morse dramas were filmed).

The tradition at Oxford is to punt from inside the boat rather than from on top of the till (or "box" as it tends to be called in Oxford) and to propel the punt with the till end facing forwards. The tradition dates from before 1880.

=== Elsewhere in England ===
Punting locations in England include the River Avon in Bath, the Great Stour in Canterbury, the Lancaster Canal from Lancaster, the River Avon in Stratford-upon-Avon, the River Nidd near Harrogate, the River Great Ouse at St Ives, and the Regent's Canal in London from Mile End Park.

There is some punting on the River Wear in Durham and some of the colleges of Durham University own punts; however, small rowing boats are more popular and better suited to the Wear. Specifically, University College owns punts for the use of its students.

On the Thames, punting is possible on most of the river above the tidal limit at Teddington; even in places where the river is broad it is often surprisingly shallow, especially at the edges. Commercial punts have been available for hire near Sunbury-on-Thames in recent times, but most Thames punting is now confined to a few Skiff and Punting clubs. There are active clubs at punting ledges at Thames Valley Skiff Club in Walton-on-Thames, Dittons Skiff and Punting Club in Thames Ditton, The Skiff Club in Teddington, Wraysbury Skiff and Punting Club in Wraysbury, Wargrave & Shiplake, and Sunbury. These clubs concentrate on racing punts and leisurely club-organised meanders.

=== Racing ===
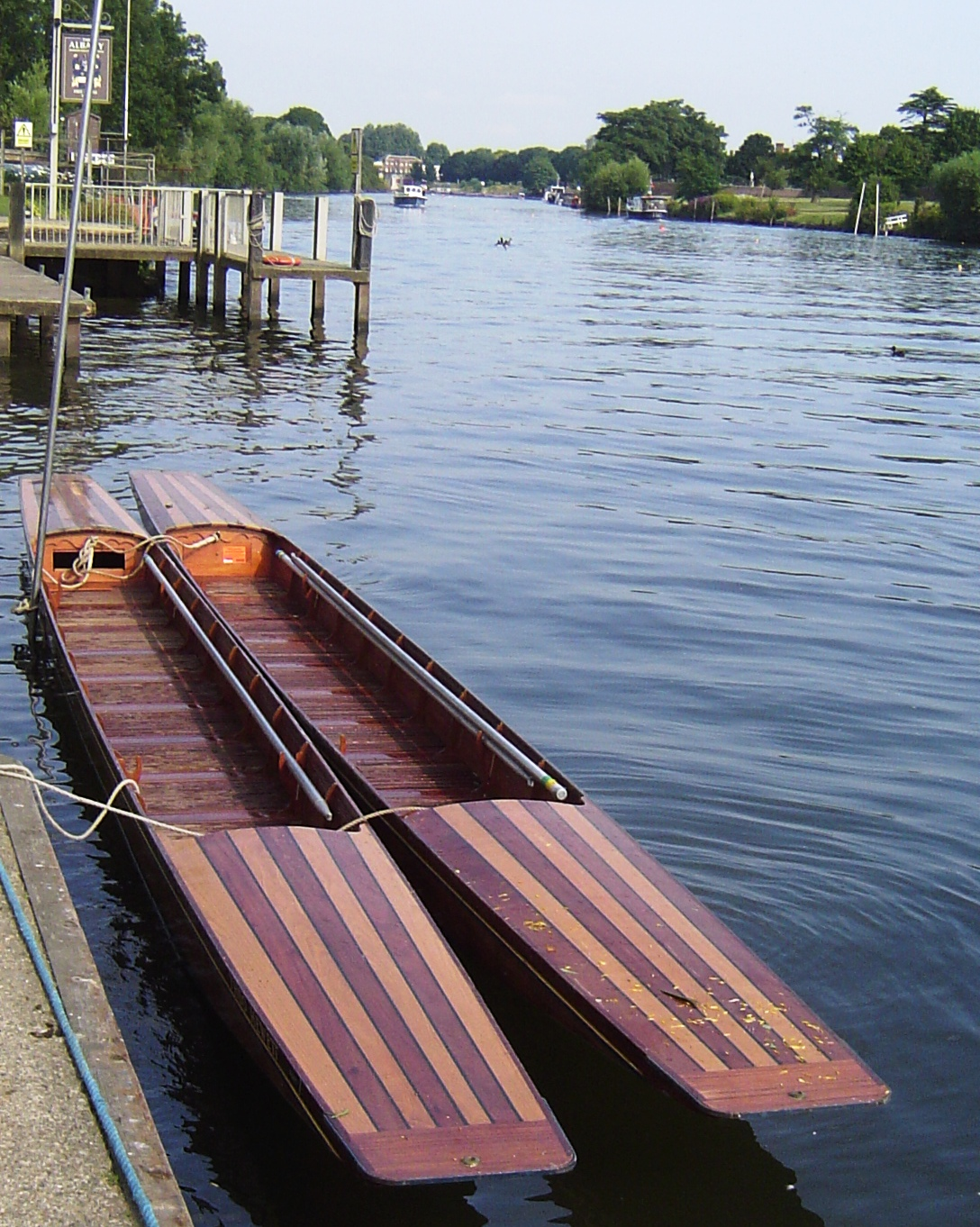
A pair of 2-foot racing punts

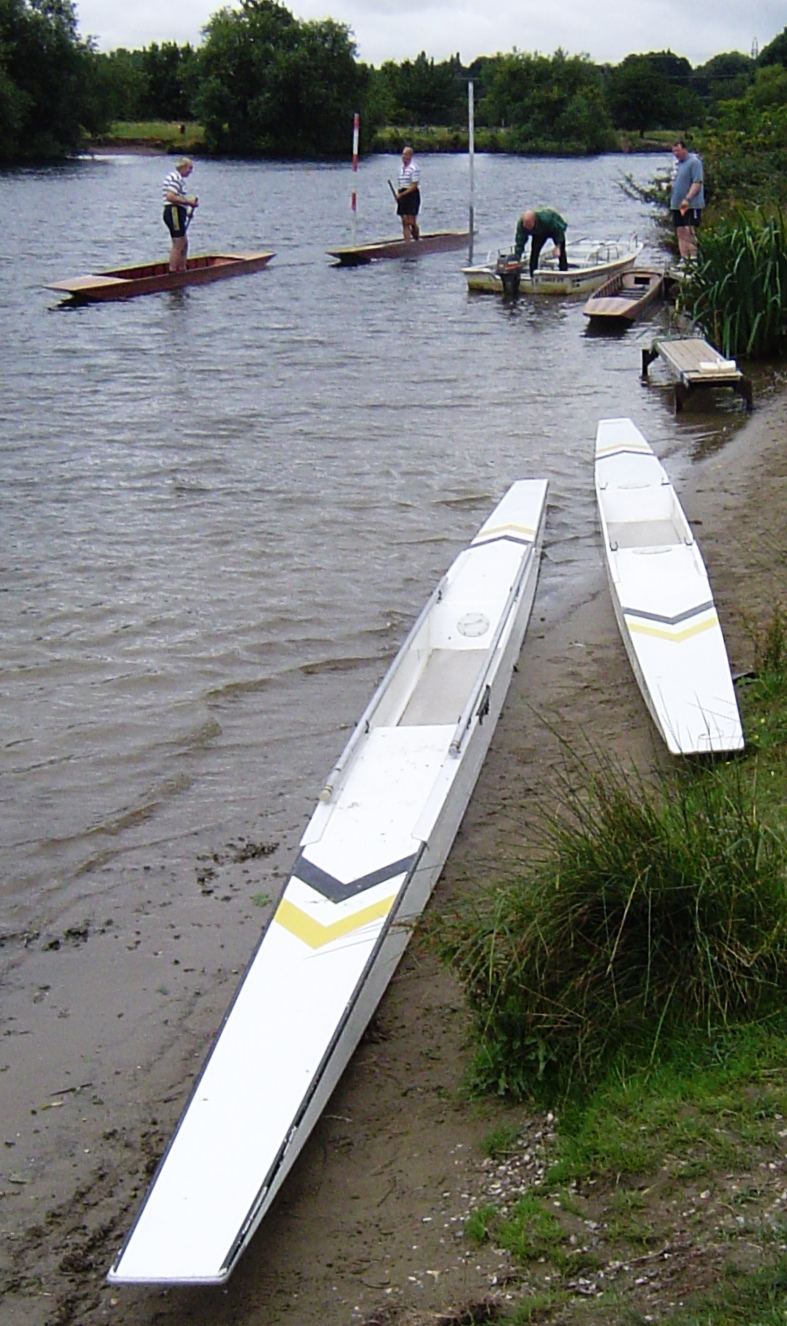
A pair of best-and-best punts, with 2-foot punts at the ryepecks in the background

Punt racing in England is governed by the Thames Punting Club, which maintains lists of umpires and publishes a handbook containing rules and bye-laws for those organising punt races on the Thames.

Races are normally held over a distance of up to 880 yards (800 m) along a straight reach of the river, each end of the course being marked by a pair of poles called "ryepecks" which are firmly pushed into the river bed before the race. Races are always one punt against another, one having the inner lane and the other the outer lane. If the outer lane has consistently deeper water, then the length of the outer course may be reduced to make the race more even.

The competitors usually start with their punts' sterns level with the line between the downstream ryepecks, punt to the upstream ryepecks, and then back. The winner is the first to pass the line of the starting ryepecks (or the first one to hit his or her own ryepeck).

The turn at the upstream ryepecks is done by "stopping-up"; that is the competitor passes the ryepeck on the outside, stops his or her punt with the pole just upstream of the ryepeck, turns to face the stern of the boat and punts back in the other direction, passing the ryepeck on the inside.

Handicap races are normally held in standard "2-foot punts", that is punts that are 2 ft (61 cm) wide in the middle and about 18 inches (46 cm) wide at each end. There are no restrictions on width or length for non-handicap races; punts used for these races are called "best boats" or "best-and-best" punts; the name comes from the "best" boat that you can find and the "best" boat that your opponent can. The narrowest of these boats are no more than 15 inches (38 cm) wide. All racing punts generally have a till at both ends, and may have canvas covers to reduce the amount of water splashing into the boat.

Punt racing has been a part of the various summer regattas along the Thames since the early 1890s with punt races held at Sunbury, Chertsey, Walton, Wraysbury, Thames Ditton, Wargrave & Shiplake, and Teddington, where there are punting ledges. The annual Thames Punting Championships are held at Maidenhead. The Punting Championships have been held for well over 100 years, one of the earliest champions being the all-rounder Lord Desborough.

Punt racing under Thames Punting Club rules has never taken hold at either Oxford or Cambridge, where serious watermen and women have always preferred rowing, but varsity punt races were held on the lower Thames in the 1950s and 1960s, and in 2007 the first official varsity race for around thirty years was held with victory going to the Cambridge team. A subsequent race held at Cambridge in 2014 was won by Oxford.

Less formal punt races have also been conducted between the Cambridge Dampers Club, and its one-time Oxford rival the Charon Club. Races were conducted on the Cam or the Cherwell using normal pleasure punts in relays, traditionally with female undergraduates on each side as the batons, jumping between boats on each leg of the race.

For a number of years after 1983, the Cambridge Dampers Club also took part in the annual Scottish Boat Race against the Honourable Society of Edinburgh Boaters, racing along the Union Canal between Hermiston and Ratho for the Antlers Trophy.

In May 2011 Red Bull held the "Punt to Point" competition in Oxford, featuring head-to-head checkpoint racing.

In Tübingen, Germany, a race with similar punts (Stocherkahnrennen) on the Neckar river, has been performed annually since 1956, with about 50 punts taking part.

== Around the world ==
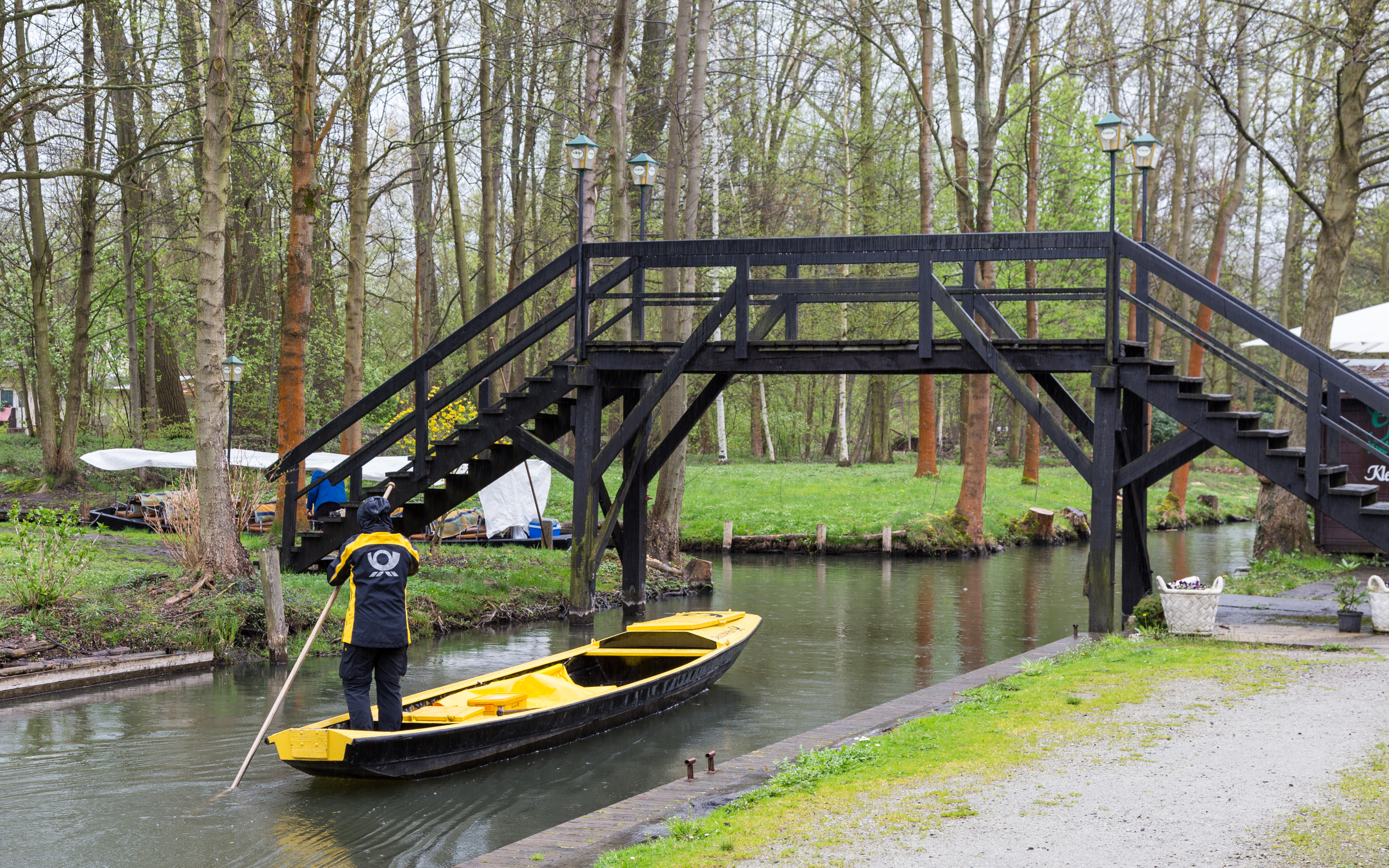
Punt of Deutsche Post in Lübbenau in Spreewald, Germany

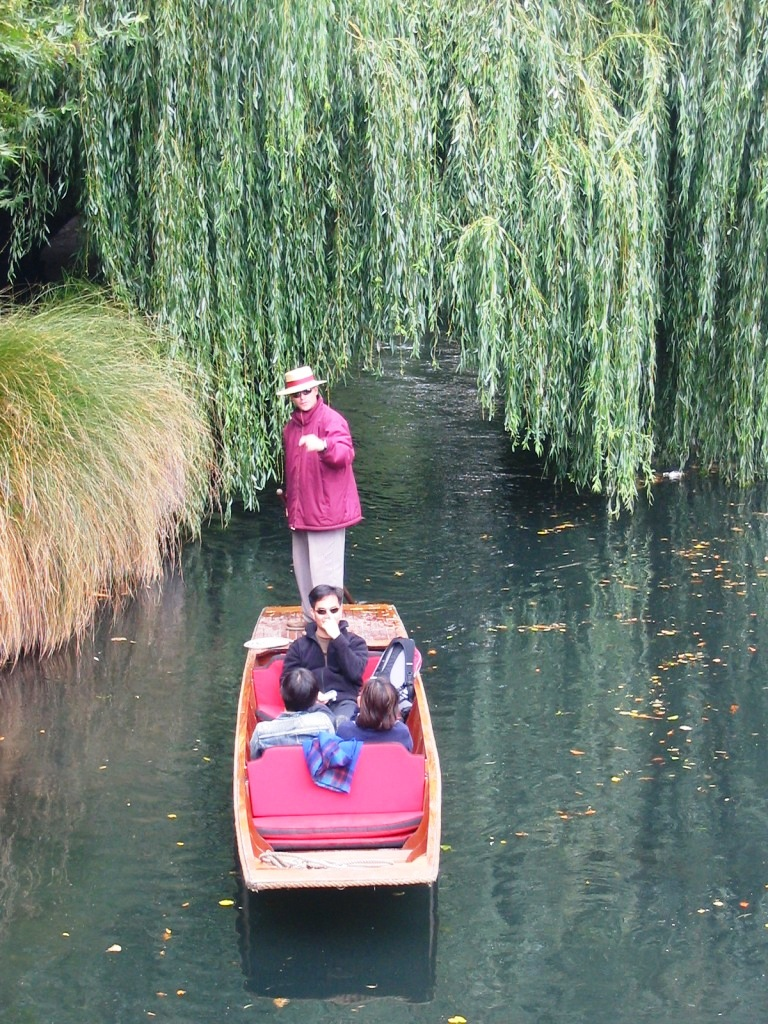
Punting on the River Avon in Christchurch, New Zealand

Traditional "Thames" punts are also popular on a few other rivers outside England. These include:

- The German region Spreewald in the state of Brandenburg, where punts are used between the small villages. The Spreewald region is known for its traditional irrigation system, with more than 200 small canals within the 484 km^{2} (187 sq mi) area. In spring, summer, and autumn a post-punt is used to deliver letters and parcels. Tourists explore the Spreewald using punts.
- The Avon in Christchurch, New Zealand, where commercialised punting is a major tourist attraction.
- The Mutha River in Pune, India, at the College of Engineering Boat Club. Punting here is mainly a leisure activity, with organised punting as part of the annual regatta, including the spectacular "Punt Formation" where illuminated punts create a nighttime display.
- Along the Cherry Creek in Denver, Colorado in the USA. Despite the allusion to gondolas, the boats are chauffeured fibreglass punts made in Cambridge.

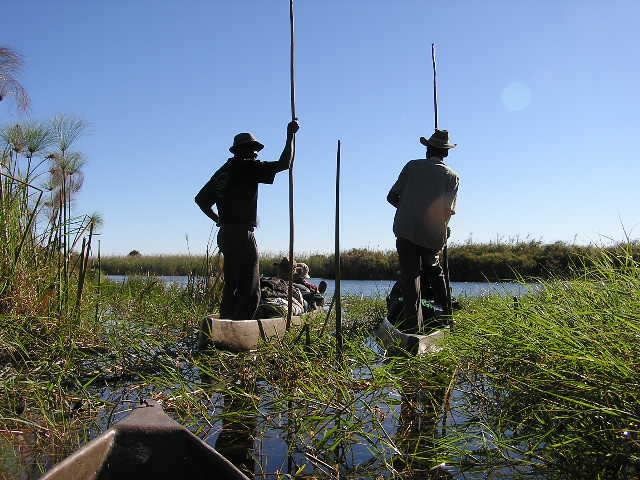
Makoro polers in Botswana waiting for hippos

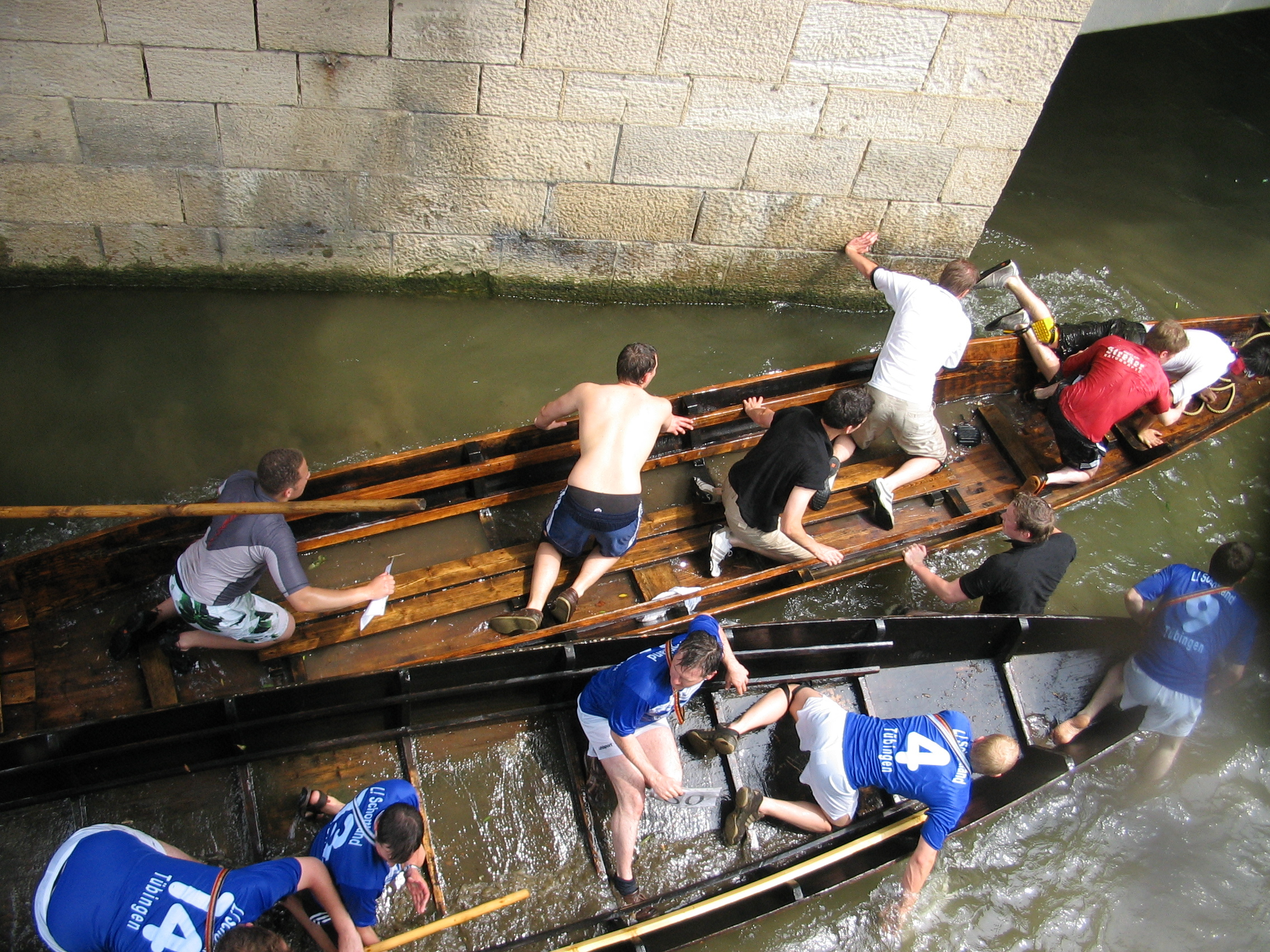
Stocherkahn racing in Tübingen, Germany

The technique of using a pole to propel a narrow boat in confined waters has developed in many other cultures, especially in marshy or swampy areas where transport on land is difficult. These include:

- The Okavango Delta in Botswana, using dug-out canoes called makoros. They are punted from the rear and are used for getting around the shallow waters of the swamp. A makoro's shape is determined by the tree from which it was made, and the punter simply stands at the bottom. Bucket seats are sometimes added for passengers' comfort.
- The Marais Poitevin, an area of marshland criss-crossed with canals north of La Rochelle in Poitou-Charentes, France. Here the boats (called barques) are somewhat shorter than a Thames punt and may have a pointed bow and stern. The punting pole (la pigouille) may be a rough cut branch or coppice pole. Originally used for transporting goods and livestock, today boats are hired by tourists.
- In the marshy Overijssel, the Netherlands there is a boat called the punter. They are about 6 metres (20 ft) in length and have a pointed bow and stern. Originally used for transporting agricultural goods, turf, and livestock, most newly built boats are either privately owned or hired by tourists.
- Weidlings are very similar to Thames punts, and are used in Switzerland and Germany. In shallow water, they are propelled by a pole. On the River Neckar in Tübingen, Germany, punting boats called stocherkahn is a university tradition. These boats are larger and deeper and have a narrower bow and stern than Thames punts. Bench seats for passengers are provided down each side, and the punter stands on a small triangular deck at the stern. There are about 130 Stocherkähne at Tübingen, most of them owned by student fraternities of the university, the Studentenverbindungen. There is a traditional annual race for these boats in June, the Stocherkahnrennen.
- Punting had a resurgence in Scotland in the 1980s as the Honourable Society of Edinburgh Boaters took to the waters of the Union Canal on the outskirts of Edinburgh. The Society staged regattas and engaged in the Scottish Boat Race with the Cambridge University Dampers Club.
- Bamboo rafts of proportions similar to punts' are used on various rivers in northern Thailand; the technique for punting them is similar to that used in Cambridge.
- Takasebune boats are used in various parts of Japan. The canals developed for such boats are often named takasegawa. The fast punting boats for passengers in Tokyo are called choki or choki-bune.

== See also ==
- Norfolk punt (a type of racing dinghy originally derived from a punt-like boat)
- Punt gun (a fowling piece mounted in a punt-like boat)
- Dongola racing (racing punts with paddles)
- Sneakbox (a punt-boat used for wildfowling)
- Skiffing (another traditional River Thames sport)
