= Thames meander =

Coordinates: 51.692°N 1.693°W

Thames meander refers to a long-distance journey over all or part of the River Thames in England. Walking the Thames Path is itself a meander, but the term usually applies to journeys using other methods such as rowing, punting, running, or swimming.

A Thames meander can be a social expedition over a few days, generally in a Thames skiff or a punt. However more specific meanders are competitive events, or record breaking attempts. Means of propulsion include swimming and running and propelling virtually every type of small craft that floats on water. Meanders are often associated with charity sponsorship. The normal start of a meander for craft is Halfpenny Bridge, Lechlade. The finish is often Teddington Lock but other points in London are used. A "giant meander" for craft goes all the way to Gravesend Pier. The Thames Meander run begins at Reading, Berkshire.

== Examples ==
- Polar explorer and endurance swimmer Lewis Pugh became the first person to swim the length of the Thames. His journey started on 17 July 2006 close to the source of the river in Gloucestershire and ended 147 miles (237 km) later in London. Pugh undertook the challenge to raise awareness of climate change.
- The record row by an individual from Lechlade to Gravesend was set by Malcolm Knight in a skiff at 43 hours 40 minutes 56 seconds in April 2005.
- In August 2010, inspired by Lewis Pugh, a team of eight swam the entire non-tidal section of the River Thames in a nonstop relay, the first time this has been done. The team, named Swim for Heroes, comprised Claire Mans, Ben Watkiss, Sarah Downes, Sam Carson, Louise Hewlett, James Hilditch, Jo Crisp and Tim Endersby. The team started at the source in the Cotswolds and finished just downstream of Teddington Lock covering a distance of 236 kilometres (147 mi) in 3 ½ days (and nights). The purpose of the swim was to raise money for Help for Heroes, a charitable organisation supporting British servicemen and women.
- The Thames Meander 54 mile race is an annual cross country running event that takes place every February.
- The comedy classic Three Men in a Boat describes the misadventures taking place in a boating trip from Kingston to Oxford.

== See also ==
- Meander, a bend in a watercourse
- The Skiff Club, Teddington
