= Upper Halliford =

Village in Surrey, England

Coordinates: 51.401°N 0.431°W

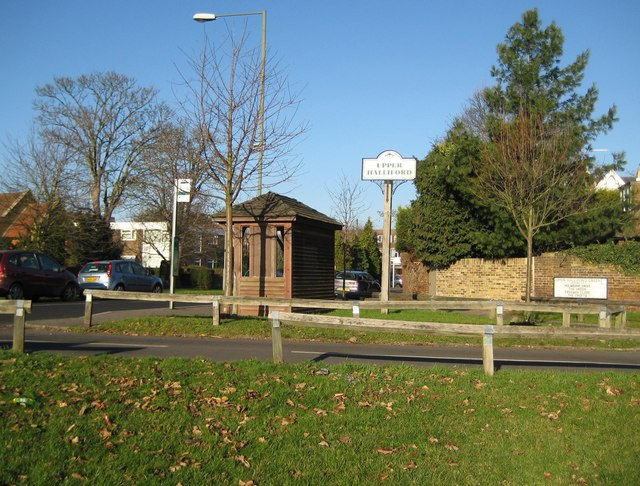
- Upper Halliford Green

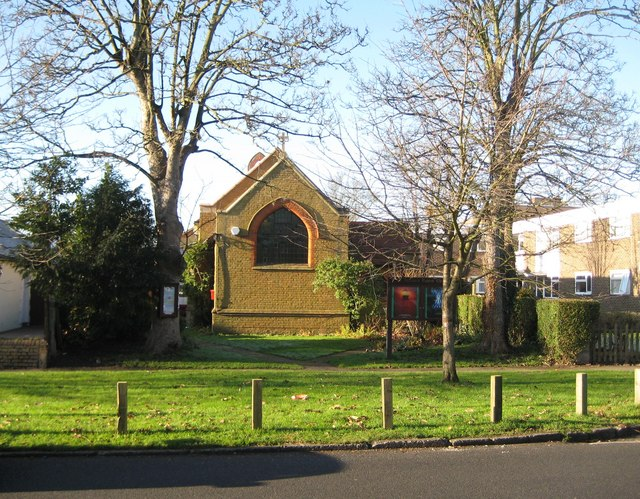
- St Andrew's Baptist Church

- Location within Surrey
- Area: 2.20 km^{2} (0.85 sq mi)
- Population: 3,173 (2011 census)
  - Density: 1,442/km^{2} (3,730/sq mi)
- OS grid reference: TQ0968
  - London: 15.6 miles (25.1 km)
- District: Spelthorne
- Shire county: Surrey
- Region: South East
- Country: England
- Sovereign state: United Kingdom
- Post town: Shepperton
- Postcode district: TW17
- Dialling code: 01932
- Police: Surrey
- Fire: Surrey
- Ambulance: South East Coast
- UK Parliament: Spelthorne

Upper Halliford is a small village in the Borough of Spelthorne, Surrey, England approximately 24 km (15 mi) west of central London. It is part of the Shepperton post town and is in the Metropolitan Green Belt. The closest settlements are Shepperton, Charlton, Walton on Thames, and Sunbury-on-Thames to the east. St Andrew’s Baptist Church is in the southern part of the village and the settlement is in the ecclesiastical Parish of Sunbury on Thames. The conservation area surrounds the village green.

The village is partially bypassed by the A244 which alternates here between a dual carriageway and a single carriageway. Upper Halliford railway station is on the Shepperton branch line and train services to London Waterloo are run by South Western Railway.

== History ==
=== Etymology ===
The Old English equivalents of the Germanic word heili(g)/(ch) included the words that later became fixed in English lexicon as hallowed and holy. The meaning of the two-component word is therefore without doubt and reflected in the crest and motto of Halliford School: vadum sanctum. Oral tradition among some of the villagers said that the halliford describes the ford that crossed the Ash before Gaston Bridge was built, where a holy man lived during Anglo-Saxon times and performed miracles. Other places contend for a local fording point. Shepperton enjoyed rights in the common land to the north, and given the importance of grazing to prosperity, the safe point at which sheep crossed to be herded to that village would have been considered holy; as too any Thames crossing. Insufficient archaeology has been unearthed to conclude which crossing point, if either, is of European Dark Age (or earlier, Roman Britain or purely Celtic Britain) date.

=== Early history ===
Throughout its early history Halliford manor's land was divided among two parishes; in the Sunbury Charter of 962 AD the Anglo-Saxons fixed Sunbury on Thames's western limits as the Ash and a north-south stream/ditch near-siding the Queen Mary Reservoir (built 1925–31). The Halliford manor house and demesne are then recorded as being in Shepperton (in which two contender plots to the first succession of such houses exist near the Thames). Upper Halliford hamlet was as the limits aforesaid state, and as feet of fines and every relevant inquisition post mortem confirms, part of the parish of Sunbury on Thames, in which its stuccoed c. 18th century-built supposèd manor, Halliford Manor confusingly stands. The Conservation Area including Home Farm cottage hint some form of pre-18th-century subinfeudated (Upper) Halliford manor house stood slightly further north. The other local manors are mentioned by the Domesday Book of 1086. Halliford (nor Upper Halliford) is unrecorded in the rolls and returns, since the 962 mention, until 1274. In terms of the feudal system, the place was in Spelthorne Hundred until hundreds became redundant with the formation of rural districts and urban district councils. It was until 1 April 1965 was in the (now historic and sports-use) county of Middlesex.

In the 14th century a windmill stood at Upper Halliford, later to be replaced by a windmill at Lower Halliford.

The church-linked Sunbury, at times personal chapel-enriched Kempton, and church-less Halliford were medieval manors. Upper Halliford manor was later but marked the site of a hamlet loosely associated with Halliford if only on a droving path for pastoralists and animals from Lower Halliford to access the common land almost 3 miles (4.8 km) north. (Note: See Ashford Common/Sunbury Common) Also a common meadow lay by the river in the south and southeast of Upper Halliford.

Upper Halliford Road and Windmill Road gained in importance after Walton Bridge was built in 1750. Gaston Bridge over the Ash in Upper Halliford, which had been in existence at least since the 15th century, was rebuilt at the same time.

Upper Halliford and Charlton did not share in the 18th-century popularity of the riverside and contained little but cottages and farmhouses. Several houses around the green at Upper Halliford survive from the early 19th century, while those called Halliford Manor and Home Farm Cottage close to the green are earlier; in the case of Halliford Manor its clock in its adjoining Clock House Cottage is dated 1744, though they have been much altered.

=== Post Industrial Revolution ===
Based on 1841 census statistics, Samuel Lewis (publisher) in his 1848 A topographical guide to England stated the population of the parish of Sunbury which included Charlton and Upper Halliford, an area of 2,580 acres (1,040 ha) was 1,828. (Note: The area of Upper Halliford is 220.08 hectares (543.8 acres) according to areas 11A and 11C of the 2001 Census)

On the establishment of the postal system, the post town of Shepperton was chosen for Upper Halliford, being at its south end, near Green Lane, nearly contiguous, making for logical rounds of post.

In 1894 the urban district of Sunbury on Thames was founded, comprising just the parish of Sunbury on Thames including, as the ecclesiastical parish does, Upper Halliford and at that time also included Charlton.

A halt at Upper Halliford along the Victorian railway to Shepperton was not opened until 1944, to serve the factories of the Sunbury Industrial Estate in World War II and was still a halt until at least 1962.

Until the 1950s there was very little new building in the western half of Sunbury parish. Gravel-working had left many large pools around Upper Halliford and Charlton, and the rest of the land was open, with many market-gardens and glasshouses. A good deal of land still remained open in 1959 when gravel-working was continuing as well as new building east, north and west of the formerly completely linear village.

== Geography ==
Surrounded on all sides by green buffer, the village heart is 15.6 miles (25.1 km) southwest of London and 12.3 miles (19.8 km) NNE of the county town, Guildford with easy access to the River Thames 1 mile (1.6 km) to the south, its station being the same to the north, and Heathrow Airport centred 5 miles (8.0 km) to the north.

A bypass of the A244 cuts off a western tract of housing linked by a pedestrian crossing. It leaves far less traffic in the village heart compared to the northern stretch (higher numbers) of Upper Halliford Road, whose west side fronts quite spacious housing and a large nature pond, whereas its east side has Grange Farm park home estate, farmhouse with smallholding, Halliford (or Manor Park) recreation ground, woodland and another smallholding before the large road bridge at the boundary with Sunbury Common. The bridge passes over the Shepperton Branch Line and the M3 motorway.

In 2001 Halliford (Note: Upper Halliford consists of Spelthorne 11A and 11C Lower Layer Super Output Areas) gave a population figure of 3,011.

=== Elevations, Soil and Geology ===
Elevations range between 12m AOD which applies for most of the village, with a maximum of 12.4m excluding bridge in the west, to 10.8m AOD in the residential road closest to one of the River Colne's many distributaries, the River Ash.

In regards to geology, the former flood plain and river course has shaped the almost flat former and present flood plain landscape from just north Heathrow Airport, as far west as Windsor, Berkshire to Brentford, Greater London with free draining alluvium and organic deposits forming a wide area of soil including Spelthorne, underlaid deeper with a mixture of gravel aquifers and London Clay which gives rise to two types of soil of free and poor drainage across all of the lower-lying parts of the London Basin.

Soil across Spelthorne is categorised as "free draining slightly acid and loamy".

== Landmarks ==
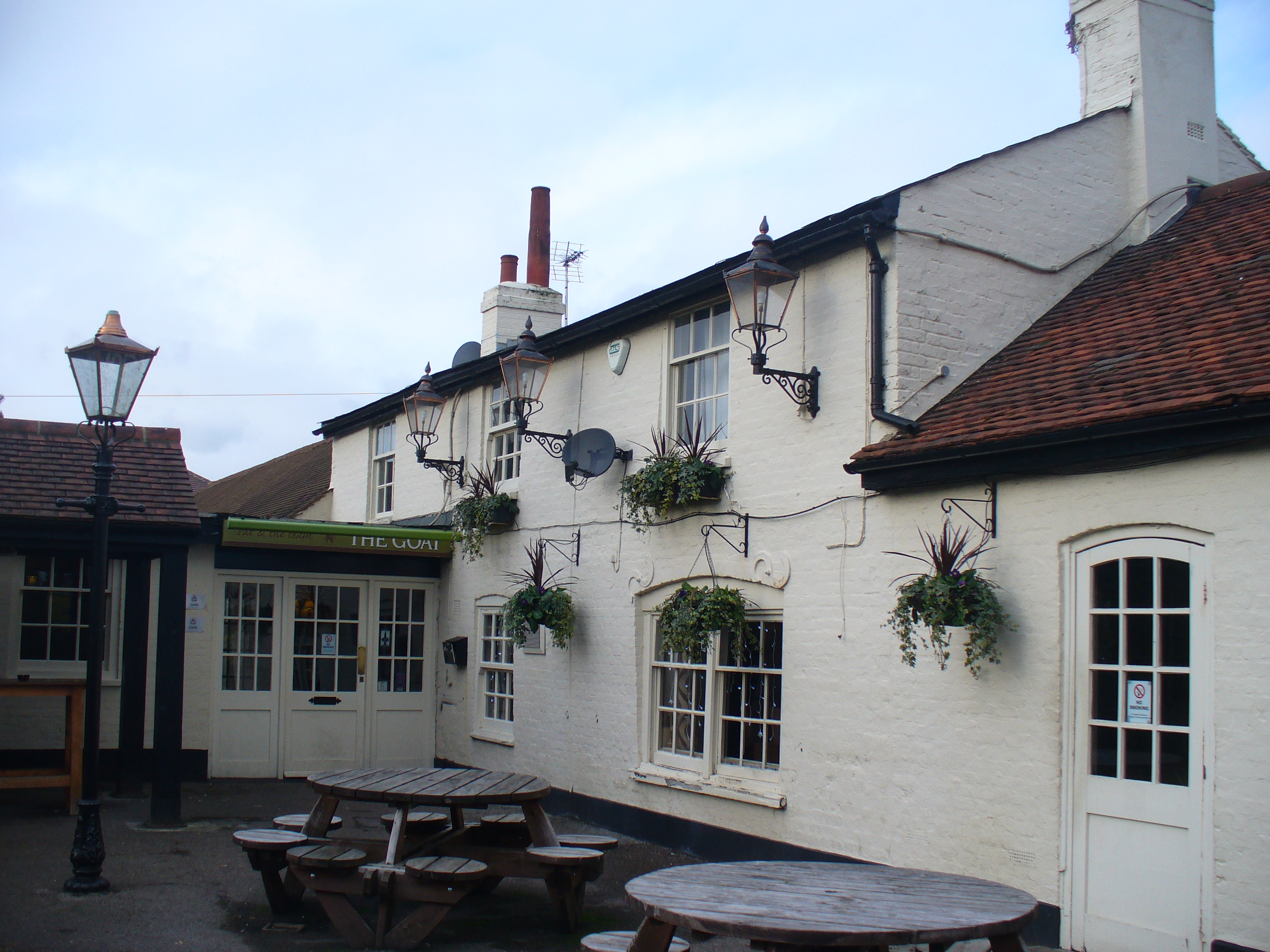
The Goat

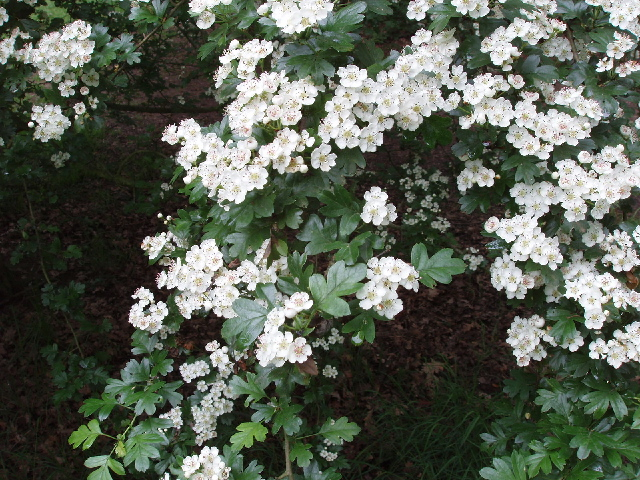
Hawthorn flowers and leaves, Halliford Park – geograph.org.uk – 172048

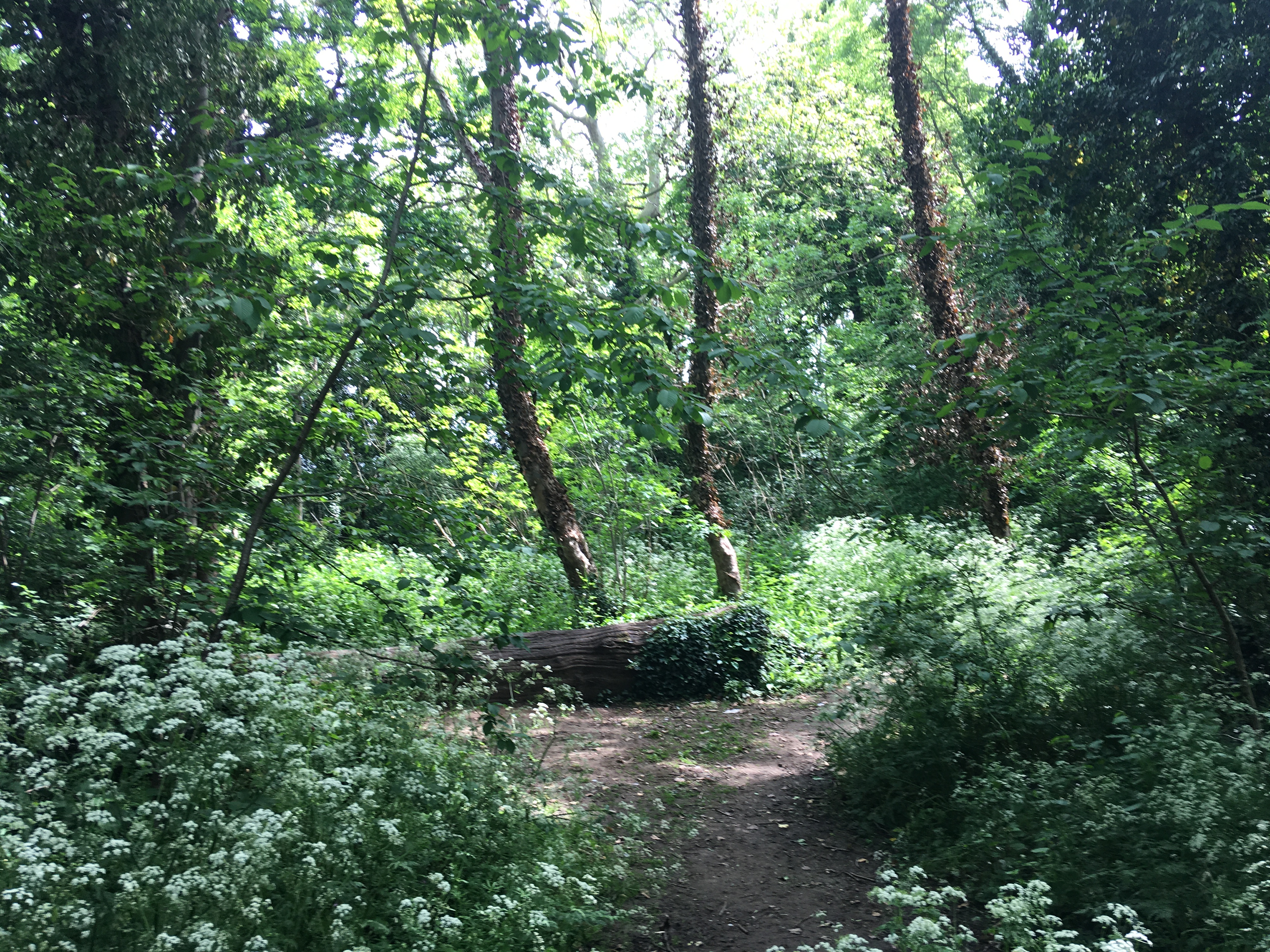
Great log in Halliford Park's large woodland part.

=== Upper Halliford Green and the Upper Halliford Conservation Area ===
Much of the bypassed Upper Halliford Road area including the main section of its green is a conservation area. This has recognised since 1993 the large number of buildings and structures pre-dating 1900 and the historic road pattern centred on the village green. In this area are seven buildings dating to before 1800. Frith Cottage, the listed building north of The Goat gains its name from former resident, painter William Powell Frith FRA who lived there for a time.

=== Care Home ===
A large residential care home was opened next to The Goat in the early part of the 21st century.

== Amenities ==
=== Garden Centre ===
The village has a large garden centre with rose nursery, restaurant and café, deli food hall and craft department, rebuilt in a glass design in 2011, Squires,

=== The Goat ===
The Goat is a pre-1800 built public house that is the only public house (as well as carvery and other restaurant) in the village centre.

=== Shopping parade ===
A convenience shopping parade provides services including a small post office, hairdressers, a café and dry cleaning.

=== Other ===
The Baptist church pictured above, opposite the green is also within the bypassed section of main through road and near the flats and shops at the centre of the village. Another pub once known as The Bugle is beside the combined single carriageway to the north and by the village park below.

== Sport and park ==
A large recreation ground takes up a minority of Halliford Park to the north of the main village (mainly woodland) which has football, flowers, trees and paths. Between this and a farm that is now an agricultural smallholding is a landscaped set of raised bungalows with gardens on Park Home lease terms.

== Demography and housing ==
2011 Census Homes
Output area	Detached	Semi-detached	Terraced	Flats and apartments	Caravans/temporary/mobile homes	Shared between households
Spelthorne 011A (Note: Upper Halliford North)	53	161	281	94	141	0
Spelthorne 011C (Note: Upper Halliford South)	182	222	101	88	26	0

The average level of accommodation in the region composed of detached houses was 28%, the average that was apartments was 22.6%.

Output area	Population	Households	% Owned outright	% Owned with a loan	hectares
Spelthorne 011A	1,599	730	43.6	34.7	92
Spelthorne 011C	1,574	619	38.8	37.5	128

== Transport ==
Road

Junction 1 of the M3 motorway is 1.2 miles (1.9 km) northeast along a choice of routes and the M25 motorway is a few miles further along that motorway at Junction 2 "the Thorpe or Chertsey Interchange".

Rail

Upper Halliford station is served by a half-hourly service to London Waterloo for which the journey time is 47–52 minutes and to Shepperton. Walton-on-Thames has more frequent services, as a mid-tier priority stop on the South West Main Line, and a 20-minute service to London Waterloo. Both are served by South Western Railway.

Pavements and footpaths

All of the schools in Lower Sunbury and Shepperton can be reached by pavement, along Nursery Road and Green Lane; those in Lower Sunbury can also be reached via the green and public footpath.

Bus

- Hallmark Connections' routes:
  - 555 from/to Heathrow Central bus station via Heathrow Terminal 4 serves a stop east of Squires and its main local stop at Gaston Bridge Road; also linking to Shepperton, Walton, Walton-on-Thames railway station, Hersham and usually Whiteley Village; the route is circuitous for airport commuters having two detours into Sunbury and Ashford/Stanwell Tesco Extra stores, whose workers and business the route assists heavily.
    - 18 buses per weekday from this point, each way. Not served by most pre-05:45 buses.
  - 557 from/to Sunbury Tesco Extra serves the whole village street; also linking to Addlestone Tesco Extra via Shepperton, Chertsey and St Peter's Hospital.
    - 13 buses per weekday, each way. Served by every bus. No Sunday services run.
