= St Nicholas Church, Shepperton =

St Nicholas Church
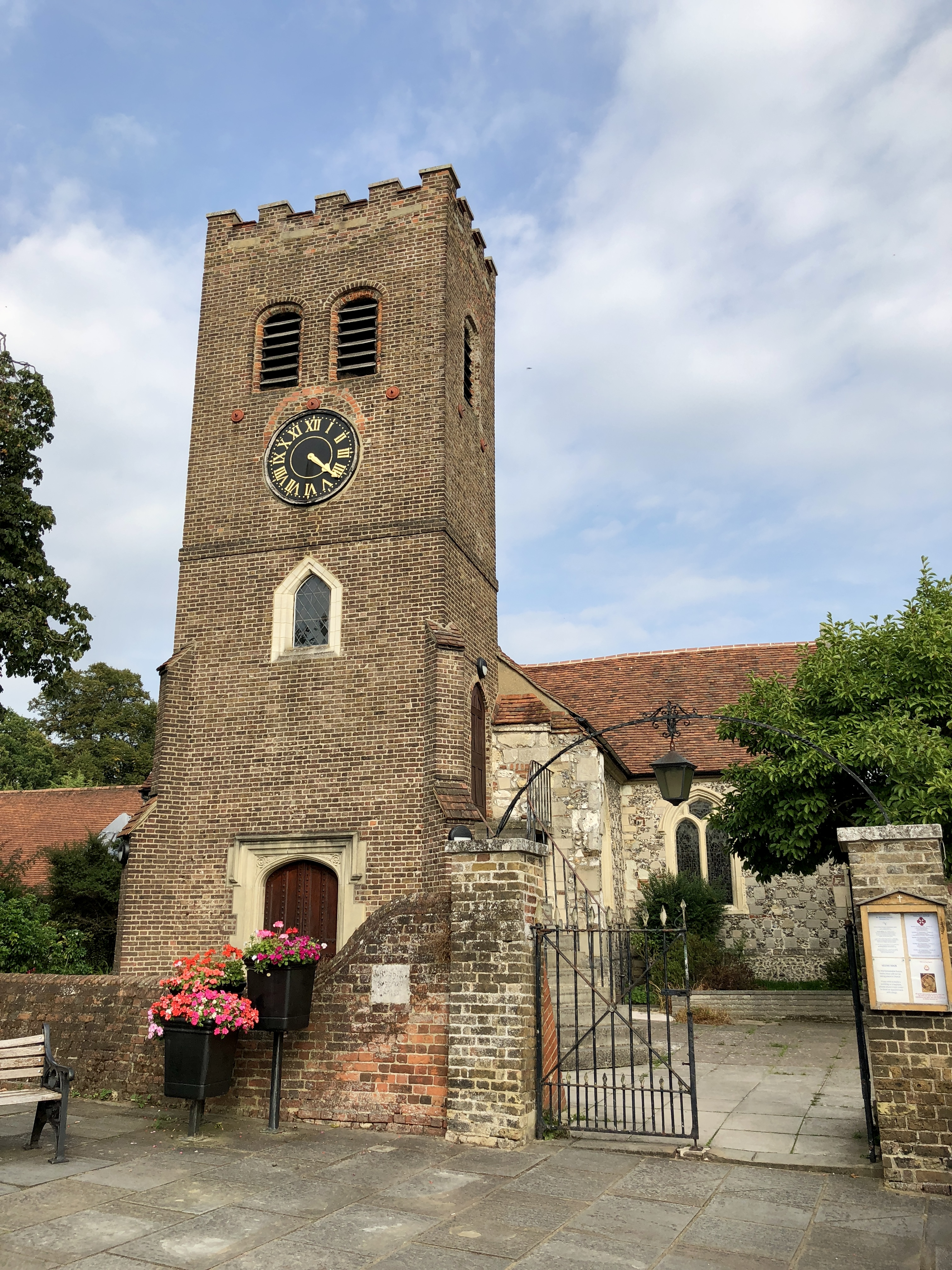

- Location within Surrey
- 51.3881°N 0.4535°W
- Location: Shepperton, Surrey, England

History
- Built: 17th century

Listed Building – Grade II*
- Official name: Church of St Nicholas
- Designated: 11 September 1951
- Reference no.: 1178304

St Nicholas Church, is a Church of England (Anglican) parish church in the village of Shepperton in the county of Surrey within the United Kingdom. A church is believed to have stood on the site since the 7th century AD, though the majority of the present stone and flint building is thought to date from 1614, with the brick bell tower added in 1714. It is a Grade II* listed building.

== History ==
It is recorded in the Domesday Book that a priest was present in Shepperton in 1087, and a church is first mentioned in 1157. The present building is thought to date from 1614, with the tower added around a century later.

The church lies within the Diocese of London and in the historic county of Middlesex. Unlike much of the rest of Middlesex, the Borough of Spelthorne (of which Shepperton is a part) was absorbed into the County of Surrey rather than into Greater London following the London Government Act 1963.

== Architecture ==
The main body of the church is thought to date from 1614 and was a reconstruction following destruction of an earlier building by flood some years earlier. (The church is located on the north bank of the River Thames.) However, it is thought that some 12th and 13th century work is incorporated in the present structure.

The tower, added circa. 1710 reputedly at the suggestion of Queen Anne, is built in Thames Valley brick and houses the church clock, installed in 1769. The tower also contains a 6 cwt ring of six bells hung for English-style change ringing. The heaviest five bells date from 1877 and were cast by John Warner & Sons, while the lightest bell (the "treble") dates from 1979 and was cast by the Whitechapel Bell Foundry.

The church building has been the subject of several restoration projects in the 21st century. In the 2010s, the south transept underwent a significant restoration, while in 2024 the top portion of the tower was dismantled and rebuilt.

== See also ==
- List of churches in the Diocese of London
