= Swan Sanctuary, Shepperton =

Wildlife hospital in Middlesex, England

The Swan Sanctuary
- Founded: 1991
- Founder: The Late Dorothy Beeson MBE BEM
- Type: Charity
- Purpose: Animal welfare
- Location: Shepperton Middlesex England
- Revenue: GBP £214,000 (2018)
- Website: Official website

The Swan Sanctuary, Shepperton is a wildlife hospital dedicated to the treatment, care and rehabilitation of swans and wildfowl in the UK and is situated close to the village of Shepperton in area of Middlesex, England. The Swan Sanctuary is registered with the Royal College of Veterinary Surgeons as Veterinary Premises No. 7002114 – Sally Goulden, B. Vet. Med., Cert. G.P. (SAM), MRCVS

== History ==
Originally run from the back garden of Dorothy Beeson's home in Egham in the 1980s and the first purpose-built site was rented from Runnymede Borough Council on a derelict allotment site in Field View, Egham. When the council wanted the land back a new site was needed with more permanent tenure, so a site in Shepperton, Middlesex was found and the new sanctuary built there in 2005. Despite a major setback when the Sanctuary was targeted by criminal fly tippers major developments were completed in 2010. The Swan Sanctuary is recognised by other notable animal charities as a centre for the treatment of swans such as the RSPB, Battersea Dogs and Cats Home and Twycross Zoo, as well as the traditional swan keepers on the Thames the Worshipful Company of Dyers and the Worshipful Company of Vintners. Local supermarkets donate their waste food to help the sanctuary feed their patients,

== Aims ==
To provide treatment, care, rehabilitation and, where possible, release back to the wild of all wildfowl species where they are injured or in distress.

To provide training for organisations who may find themselves faced with wildfowl casualties in the capture and handling of the birds.

Education of groups of all ages in the work done by the Swan Sanctuary.

== Achievements ==
1991 Founder Dorothy Beeson awarded BEM

2000 Lord Erskine award from the RSPCA in recognition of the contribution to animal welfare.

2001 Daily Mirror Pride of Britain award for conservation work.

2015 Founder Dorothy Beeson awarded MBE for services to swan rescue and rehabilitation.

2015 Founder Dorothy Beeson awarded International Fund for Animal Welfare (IFAW) prestigious Animal Action Award

2018 The Swan Sanctuary awarded Queen's Award for Voluntary Service

== Funding ==
The sanctuary receives no government funding and is run entirely on donations from the public and corporate sponsorship.

== The Swan Sanctuary on television ==
The sanctuary has appeared in the following television programmes:

- The Thames with Tony Robinson (Channel 5) Series 3 Episode 7 Available to stream on My 5
- Wildlife on One – Natural Neighbours (BBC 1994)
- Animal Hospital (BBC 1994–2004)
- Animal 24:7 (BBC 2006–2010)
- Pet Rescue (Channel 4 1997–2002)
- Animal Rescue Squad (Channel 5 2008)
- In the Shape of Love – The Swan Sanctuary of Surrey, UK (Supreme Master Television 2011)

== Key people ==
Founder

- The late Dorothy Beeson MBE BEM

Patrons

- Queen Noor of Jordan
- Sir John and Lady Egan
- The Hon. Russell and Marcia Mishcon
- David and Molly Borthwick

Former patrons

- Marchioness of Salisbury
- Sir Ronald Hobson KCVO
- Lady Patricia Marina Hobson OBE
- Michael Caine
- Lord and Lady Remnant

Trustees

- Stephen P Knight
- Melanie G Beeson
- Cayley West
- Max Grundy
- Howard Smith

== See also ==
- Swan
- Mute swan
- Abbotsbury Swannery
- Swan Upping
- 1991 New Year Honours
- 2015 New Year Honours
