= Shepperton =

Village in Surrey, England

- Village
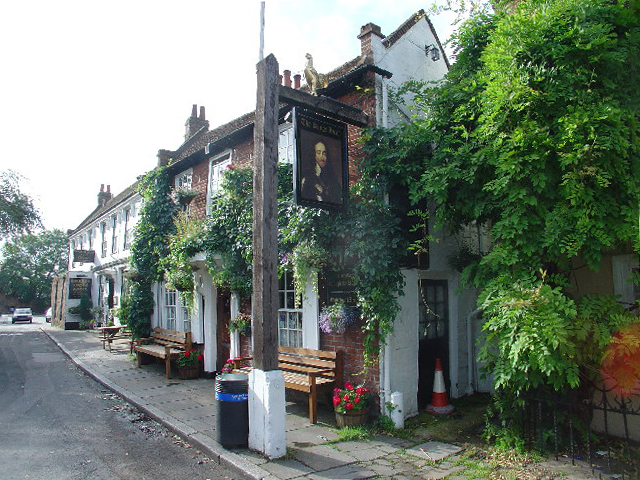
- Church Square, Shepperton

- Location within Surrey
- Area: 6.98 km^{2} (2.69 sq mi)
- Population: 9,753 (2011 census)
  - Density: 1,397/km^{2} (3,620/sq mi)
- OS grid reference: TQ080672
- District: Spelthorne
- Shire county: Surrey
- Region: South East
- Country: England
- Sovereign state: United Kingdom
- Post town: Shepperton
- Postcode district: TW17
- Dialling code: 01932
- Police: Surrey
- Fire: Surrey
- Ambulance: South East Coast
- UK Parliament: Spelthorne

Shepperton is a village in the Spelthorne district, in north Surrey, England, around 15 mi (24 km) south west of central London. The settlement is on the north bank of the River Thames, between the towns of Chertsey and Sunbury-on-Thames. The village is mentioned in a document of 959 AD and in Domesday Book.

In the 19th century, resident writers and poets included Rider Haggard, Thomas Love Peacock, George Meredith, and Percy Bysshe Shelley, who were attracted by the proximity of the River Thames. The river was painted at Walton Bridge in 1754 by Canaletto and in 1805 by Turner. Shepperton Lock and nearby Sunbury Lock were built in the 1810s, to facilitate river navigation.

Urbanisation began in the latter part of the 19th century, with the construction in 1864 of the Shepperton Branch Line, which was sponsored by William Schaw Lindsay, the owner of Shepperton Manor. Its population rose from 1,810 residents in the early 20th century to a little short of 10,000 in 2011. Lindsay had hoped to extend the railway via Chertsey to connect to the South Western Main Line, however the village station remains a terminus. The rise in population and passing trade led to small businesses lining most of its high street by the end of the 20th century.

Shepperton Film Studios is in the neighbouring village of Littleton, approximately 1 mi (2 km) to the north. The Swan Sanctuary and two SSSIs, one of which is managed by Surrey Wildlife Trust, are nearby.

== Toponymy ==
The first written record of Shepperton is from a charter of 959, in which it appears as Scepertune. The name is thought to derive from the Old English scēp (sheep), hirde (herdsman) and tūn (enclosure, farm or settlement). The name is generally agreed to mean "shepherd's farm" or "shepherd's settlement".

== History ==
=== Early history ===
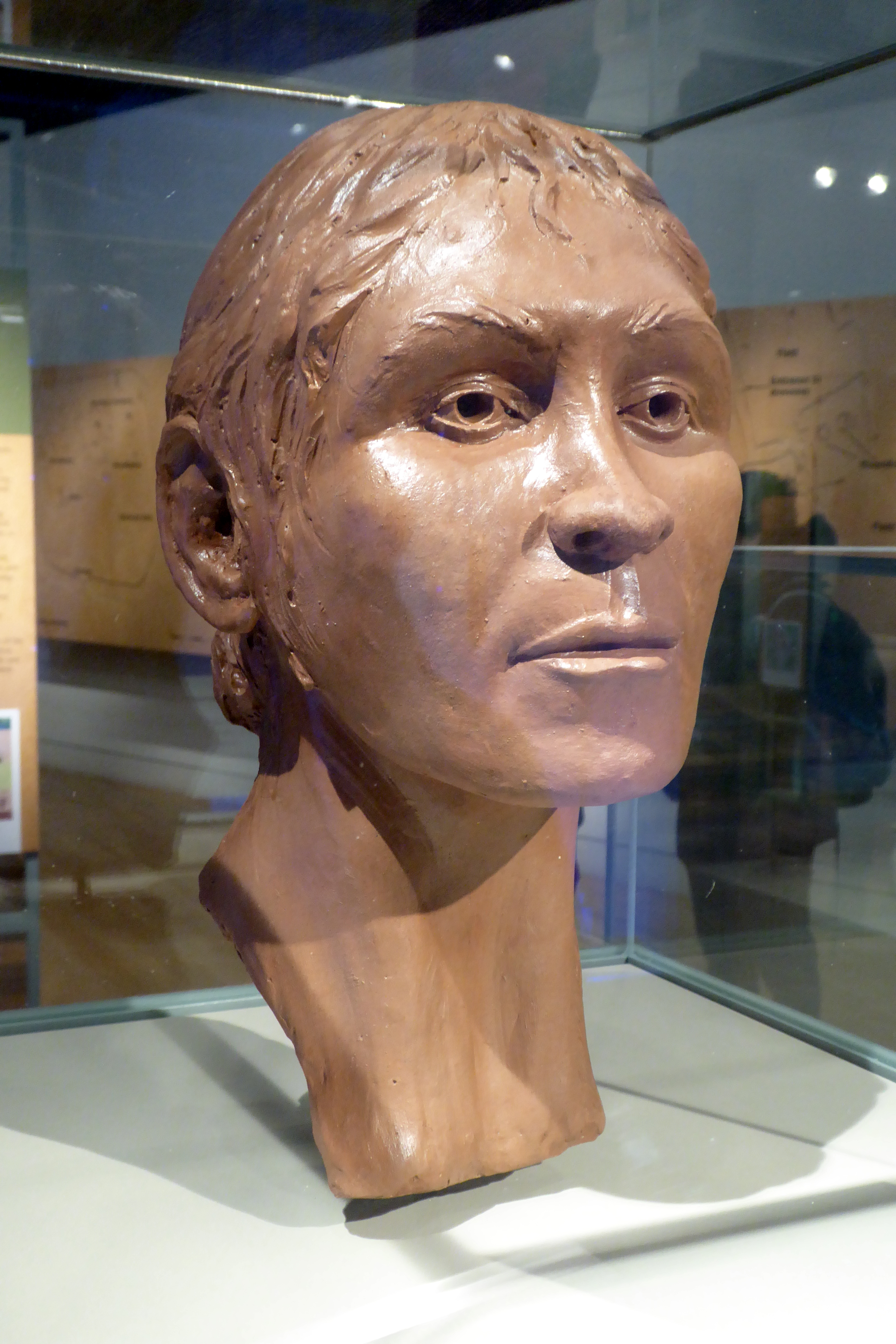
Reconstruction of the face of the Neolithic woman buried at Shepperton Henge

The earliest evidence of human activity in the local area is from the middle Neolithic. A henge, taking the form of a penannular ring ditch, was discovered in the late 1980s, close to the River Ash, to the north of Shepperton Green. The structure was around 23 m (75 ft) in diameter and is thought to have been constructed c. 3500 BCE. The main entrance to the henge was aligned with the position of the sun at sunrise on the summer solstice and lumps of red ochre had been placed inside the ditch to mark the position of the most southerly moonrise. The ditch appeared to have been refilled and re-excavated in the late Neolithic. Two burials were discovered at the site - a torso, probably male, and an almost complete skeleton of a female. Radiocarbon dating showed that the woman had lived in the late 3rd millennium BCE and analysis of the isotope composition of her teeth suggested that she had grown up in an area where lead-zinc ore was found, possibly Derbyshire, the Mendips or the North Pennines. A reconstruction of the face of the woman from the skull was created at the University of Manchester in 2004.

Finds from the Iron Age include an inhumation of a woman in her 40s, found on Chertsey Road, and iron swords, discovered at Shepperton Ranges. Pewter plates, from the latter site, are thought to date from the late Roman period. Evidence of late-Iron Age and Saxon settlements was found at Shepperton Green in the late 1960s and early 1970s.

=== Later history ===
Shepperton is recorded in Domesday Book of 1086 as Scepertone. It had a population of 25 households and was held by Westminster Abbey; (excluding any woodland, marsh and heath) it had eight hides, pasture for seven carucates and one weir (worth 6s 8d per year). In total, the annual amount rendered was £6.

Map of Shepperton

The Church Lane and Church Square area, leading to and next to the river predates by several centuries the High Street as the village nucleus. When the Thames Valley Railway built in 1864 the terminus of Shepperton railway station, 1 mile (1.6 km) north, for the 12 initial years a single train and track running to and from Strawberry Hill, the village slowly expanded into its northern fields. Its coming which was largely due to contributions and permission of W. S. Lindsay the owner of Shepperton's manor.

The River Thames was important for transport from the late 13th century and carried barley, wheat, peas and root vegetables to London's markets; later timber, building materials such as bricks, sand and lime, and gunpowder, see the Wey Navigation.

While the village was wholly agricultural until the 19th century, there are originally expensive gravestones of the local minor gentry in the churchyard, two of which are dedicated to their naturalised black servants, Benjamin and Cotto Blake who both died in 1781. These bear the inscription "Davo aptio, Argo fidelior, ipso Sanchone facetior". During this long period since the conquest the wealth of the local rector and his bishop was great: William Grocyn was rector 1504–1513 and was an Oxford classical academic who corresponded regularly with Erasmus and Lewis Atterbury (1707–31) expended much of the large parish revenues on having the large tower rebuilt.

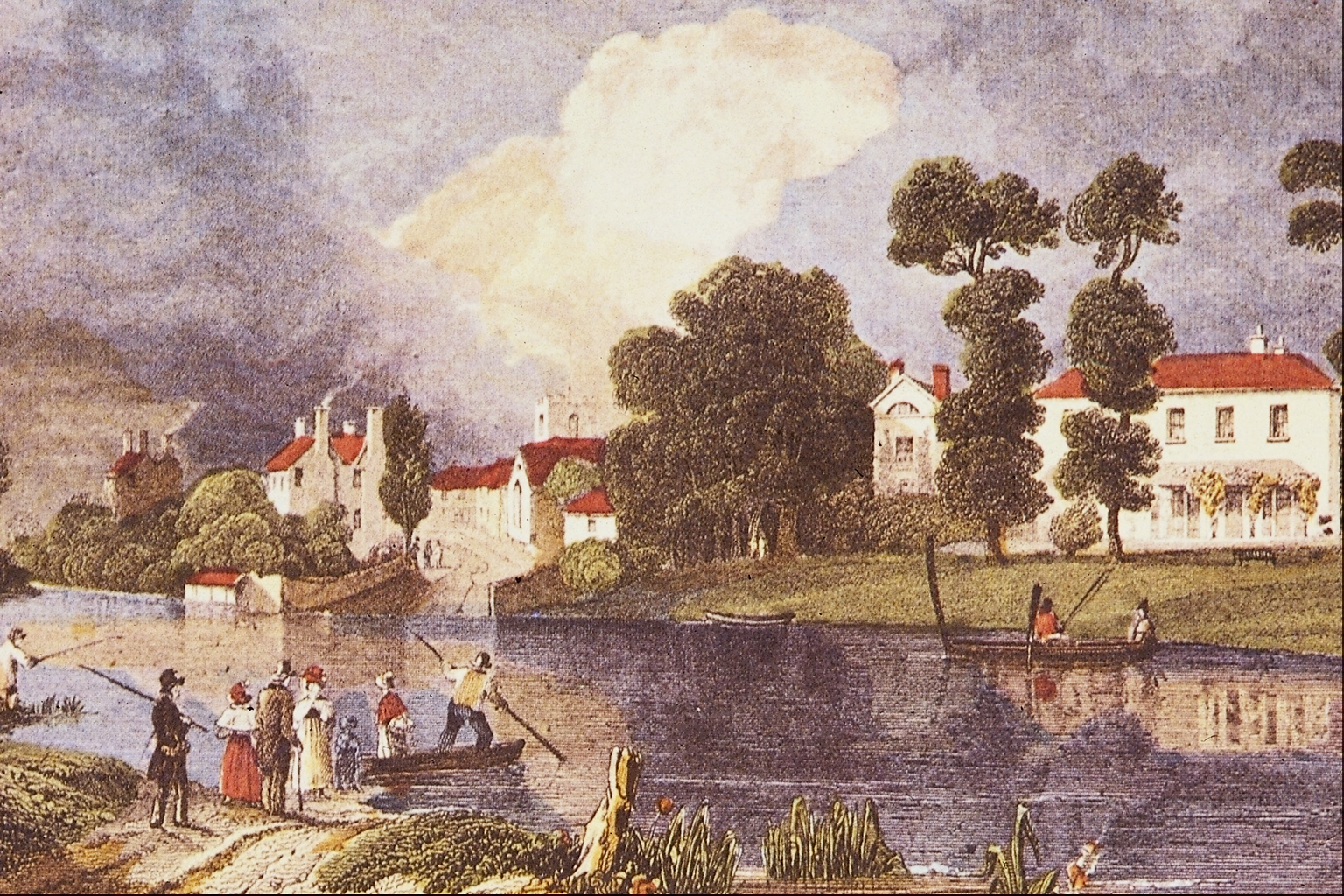
19th-century Shepperton by William Tombleson

A large net income of rents and tithes of £499 per year was paid to the rectory belonging to S. H. Russell in 1848; this compares to £600 of poor relief, including for supporting its workhouse, paid out in 1829.

A change to secular council-administered rather than church-administered public services followed the establishment of poor law unions and Sanitary Districts and was completed with the founding, in 1889, of the Middlesex County Council and Staines Rural District from 1896. In 1930 on the rural district's abolition, Shepperton became part of the Sunbury-on-Thames Urban District until its dissolution into a reduced and reconfigured county of Surrey in 1965. Three districts of the historic county thus did not become part of Greater London: Staines Urban District also joined Surrey and Potters Bar Urban District joined Hertfordshire. In 1951 the civil parish had a population of 6060. On 1 April 1974 the parish was abolished.

In 2025, a new sand and gravel quarry, operated by Cemex, was opened in Shepperton.

Use in semi-fiction and alleged hauntings

In semi-fiction, George Eliot's Scenes of Clerical Life telling the Sad Fortunes of The Rev. Amos Barton, gives a thinly veiled picture of Chilvers Coton's church and village in the early 19th century in which she uses the name Shepperton. If anything real is to be gleaned for its use, it is perhaps a passing similarity. Shepperton Manor by John Mason Neale was contemporaneously written in 1844 fifteen years after he had spent six years living in the village. Old parts of Shepperton are said to be haunted by the ghost of a headless monk. Battlecrease Hall (formerly home to Walter Hayes, Ford Motor Company executive and a founder of the company's Formula One programme) is alleged by its owners and certain visitors to have poltergeists.

=== Conservation areas ===
==== Church Square in Old Shepperton ====
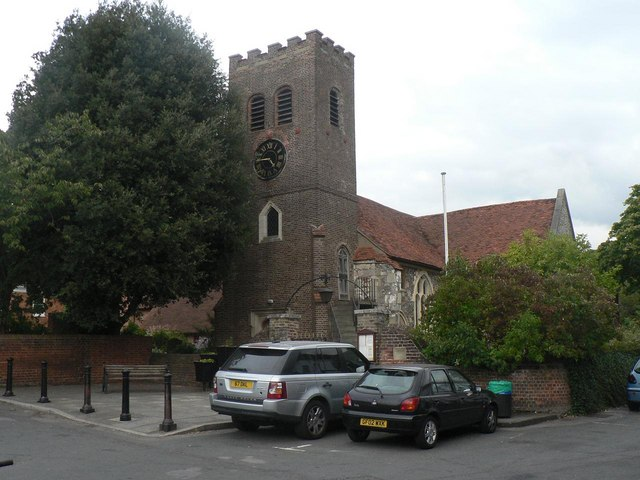
St Nicholas Church, Shepperton

Leading to this is a short, since 1989 bypassed, winding lane from the High Street to Church Square, flanked by Shepperton Manor and the cricket ground, with some listed walls. Sir Nikolaus Pevsner described the view looking towards the south-east of the square with its now listed buildings and river opening as "one of the most perfect village pictures that the area has to offer". It offers two pub/restaurants two hotels, the Anchor Hotel and the Warren Lodge Hotel. In this little square there is also the King's Head public house.

The riverside manor, late 18th century, (its predecessor, as with the church here, predates the 12th century), features a room painted and rendered to look like a tent or draped damask. Also Grade II* listed is the c. 1500 timber framed Old Rectory refronted in the early 18th century, and including a reception hall built in 1498. Its front cladding has mathematical tiles.

Listed in the same high category of listed building is the parish church, St Nicholas' – its dedication is as with the ancient riverside churches of Thames Ditton and Chiswick. (Note: This source notes among other detailed entries about its monuments and history that much of the church is c.1600 with significant recycled older materials including rubble and flint to form the nave; its tower was built using such materials in 1710.) Also architecturally Grade II* is restored half timbered Winches Cottage on the west side of the lane which is 17th century.

==== Lower Halliford ====
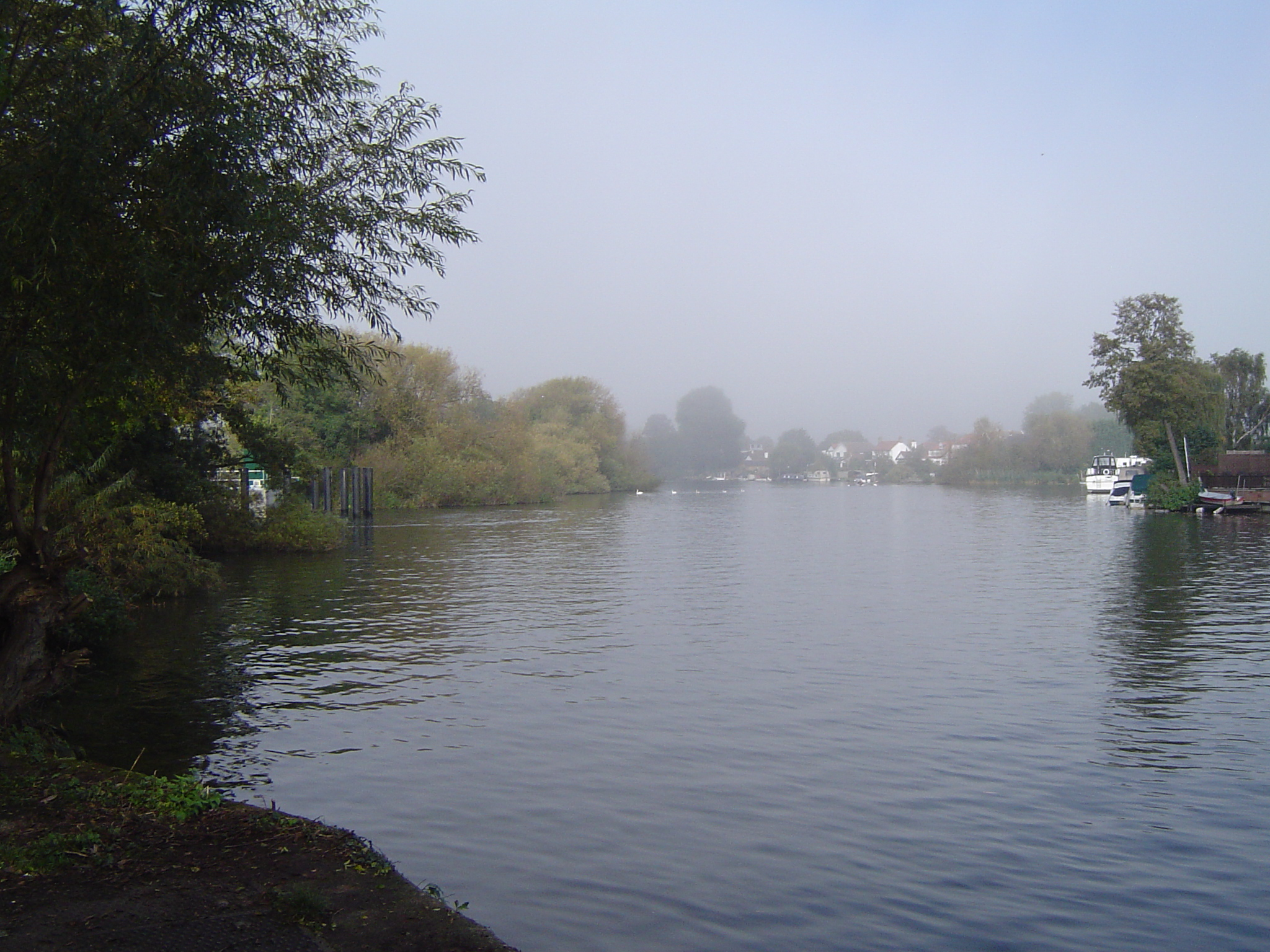
View up the River Thames towards Lower Halliford

The village includes the neighbourhood of Lower Halliford, formerly a near but separate hamlet, which historian Susan Reynolds places at the eastern end of a reduced, river bend-consumed half of the early medieval village, east of the Old Shepperton Conservation Area due to erosion.

This area is typified by a small number of detached classical three-storey 18th century riverside houses high on the riverside road on the outside of the river bend; the bend being flanked by riverside meadows with small boat moorings, low rise chalet-style houses to the south west, the Las Palmas Estate, named after the land once being that of the Spanish Ambassador; further west by the wooded Shepperton Cricket Club and by the village Green, Bishop Duppas Park to the east, formerly Lower Halliford Common and in a small part owned by the Old Manor House (Halliford).

From the 1760s—1860s a ropery was an industry here then from the 1860s—1870s brick clay was extracted.

Halliford Manor, confusingly also called The Old Manor, dates to at least the 13th century and ownership became royal, being held by Elizabeth I and the wives of Charles I and Charles II. The Bishop of Winchester, Brian Duppa (1588–1662) owned the waterside meadows adjoining to the south and was also an important landowner in Croydon's history, see Duppas Hill. (Note: The singular owner was Bishop Duppa see possessives in geographic names) Wealthy writers built or expanded homes here in the 19th century, primarily as summer residences, such as Rider Haggard, Thomas Love Peacock, George Meredith and Percy Bysshe Shelley.

The Old Manor became yet another rebuilt Georgian house. The house which features a modillioned eaves cornice and glazing-bar sash windows to the first floor. Halliford School in the centre of this area was the 18th–19th century home of Emma Hamilton, mistress of Admiral Nelson.

The 21st century fully renovated hotel and restaurant (formerly the Ship), Harrison's with river views is here beside the shorter Red Lion public house which in turn has a narrow, secluded south-facing public house picnic area overlooking the relatively narrow, non-tidal river Thames. It is for this reason a bridge and ferry was recorded here from 1274 to 1410.

The tern is applicable also to the mostly riverside homes and public park almost surrounded by the River Thames, south of the road from Kingston to Chertsey including next to Walton Bridge by Walton on Thames. The main park is Bishop Duppas Park and almost surrounds completely the Old Manor.

There is mention of Halliford in 962 and there was a settlement there by 1194. However the division into Upper and Lower Halliford does not appear until the late 13th century. Upper Halliford is a large hamlet in the parish of Sunbury, but Lower Halliford was almost certainly the main settlement of the manor. The creation of Desborough Cut diverted the main navigation of the Thames away from the Lower Halliford and Shepperton loop, rendering flooding far less common.

The poet Thomas Love Peacock lived at Elm Bank House here from 1822 until his death in 1866.

==== Manygate Lane ====
The field land and large houses on this estate were bought by Lyon Homes from landowner and developer Edward Scott in the 1950s.

The estate on this street lies in a conservation area, consisting of a modular development in geometric, white-painted modernism from the 1960s. Private sector estate housing experiments of the 1960s with terraced, white panelled communal landscaped front gardens by Swiss architect Edward Schoolheifer. Its configuration draws on the American Radburn model, a planning principle also championed by Eric Lyons and Span Developments across Ham Common in Richmond, Blackheath, and New Ash Green, Kent.

== Localities ==
The conservation areas of Old Shepperton and Lower Halliford are localities, as is Littleton.

=== Charlton ===
51.411°N 0.444°W
Charlton is a suburban hamlet and narrow area to the north, bounded to the west by the Queen Mary Reservoir in Littleton, bounded to the east and south by Thames water treatment works from that reservoir and by the M3 motorway. As a well-developed hamlet, bounded by farms, it also referred to as a village or neighbourhood. Its post town is Shepperton. Its parish is Sunbury-on-Thames. In the south of the neighbourhood, on the Shepperton side of the motorway are a general waste transfer station, further fields and Sunbury Golf Course, which has 18 holes and is bisected by the Shepperton railway line.

Charlton appears in Domesday Book as Cerdentone. It was held by Roger de Rames. Its domesday assets were: 5 hides; 1½ ploughs (with potential for 3½), meadow for 4 ploughs, cattle pasture. It rendered £1 10s 0d. However this manor was in the parish of Sunbury and unlike the three adjoining manors, Shepperton, Halliford and Sunbury did not reach down to the river public meadowlands, used for grazing of animals.

=== Shepperton Green ===
51.398°N 0.459°W
Shepperton Green is that part of the village which continues immediately west of the M3 motorway, north-west of the village centre. Across the River Ash, Surrey, which is no more than a stream most of the year, adjoining, to its north is Littleton. Taken together with Littleton, three farms operate on the edges of this conjoined residential area, providing a buffer to the north and west. Shepperton's central SSSI is on the south side of the motorway Sheep Lake Walk and meadows, managed by Surrey Wildlife Trust. To the west are large lakes (one sifted and worked for gravel). This means that Shepperton Green with Littleton is buffered to all sides, except for its eastern side with its road bridge to Shepperton proper, classified as Shepperton Town ward and county council electoral division. This area is currently grouped with Laleham for all local elections.

== High Street and economy ==
Shepperton has a traditional high street, shorter than that at nearby Ashford with two medium-size supermarkets, village hall, library, shops, optician, hairdressers, a wide range of restaurants, several cafés, with the railway terminus at the northern end.

Shepperton railway station saw high ticketed entries and exits for a settlement of its size to 422,000 (6 April 2010 – 5 April 2011), being a terminus with main commercial destinations being in the City of London, Kingston upon Thames. commercial hubs of West London and South London accessed along the route; this is supplemented by secondary school usage, with a substantial state school and private school.

=== History board ===
The Village Hall in the High Street has a large depiction of the economic life and of the history of the village. In October 2011, a group of children from St Nicholas C of E Primary School won a competition to create the history board, which was then edited by a graphic designer and officially opened by the mayor with a large ceremony and some press, after Sunbury had held a similar competition. The board itself includes a grassland to represent the pastures and provides local information.

== Public services ==
Four infant/junior/primary schools, a senior comprehensive school and senior private school are in the village.

See List of schools in Surrey

Home Office policing in Shepperton is provided by Surrey Police. Public transport is co-ordinated by Surrey County Council who also provide the statutory emergency fire and rescue service who have a station in Sunbury.

St Peter's Hospital on the far side of Chertsey is a large NHS hospital administrated by Ashford and St Peter's Hospitals NHS Trust. It was opened under its existing name in 1947. The South East Coast Ambulance Service Foundation Trust provides emergency patient transport to and from this facility. Other forms of health care are provided for locally by several small clinics and surgeries.

Waste management is co-ordinated by the local authority via the Surrey Waste Disposal Authority and domestic waste collected by Spelthorne Borough Council. Locally produced inert waste for disposal is sent to landfill in Alfold and Shefford, and a proportion to energy from waste plants in Slough and Kent to lower landfill tax. Plans have been approved to permit gasification in Charlton in the north of the Shepperton post town as part of the county's Eco Park to take up to half of the county's residual waste. Shepperton's distribution network operator for electricity is UK Power Networks; aside from renewables there are no power stations in the area. Thames Water manages Shepperton's drinking and waste water; water supplies being sourced from the London sources including several reservoirs fed by the River Thames locally. There are water treatment works at Ashford, Hampton and sewage treatment works at Isleworth.

== Topography ==
Shepperton has a long boundary with the River Thames in its southernmost salient, which almost surrounds Spelthorne. Old Shepperton is almost surrounded by the extreme southern meander within this. Prehistoric glacial retreat north of this has made the north bank almost flat for a considerable distance and as such, elevation never exceeds 14 m above mean sea level (on the border of Laleham). The river never exceeds 11.5 m, (beside Dumsey Meadow and under Chertsey Bridge). The lowest elevation is 9 m in flood meadows at the confluence of the Ash with the Thames. The Ash is the border with Littleton and Sunbury-on-Thames (mostly, to the northeast, with its technical hamlet, Upper Halliford).

Dumsey Meadow SSSI is the only piece of undeveloped, unfenced water meadow by the river remaining on the River Thames below Caversham, and is home to a variety of rare plants and insects.

The Swan Sanctuary moved to an old gravel extraction site by Fordbridge Road in 2005 from its former base in Egham.

On the opposite bank are in downstream order are Chertsey Bridge and Chertsey Meads, the Hamm Court area of Addlestone, three islands, (the first two of which have multiple properties) (Lock (Note: This has a stretch of open grass where refreshments are served.), Hamhaugh and D'Oyly Carte, one large man-made island, (Desborough), and the riverside parts of Walton on Thames, the upstream part of which is also open land, Cowey Sale Park. (Note: Refreshments are served.) The towpath is the official route of three passing through the Shepperton reaches (of the Thames Path) as heading upstream from Hampton Court Palace another marked version takes Walton Bridge, the official version takes the Shepperton-Weybridge Ferry and another marked version crosses to the north bank at Chertsey Bridge.

Upper Halliford

Upper Halliford has since the early 20th century been in Shepperton post town, and almost contiguous, but with its own station, residential roads, fair and shopping parade, even an Upper Halliford Village sign. Arguably in modern analysis it is a village, with the second highest concentration of development in the post town.

Shepperton Green

This neighbourhood is smaller than the adjoining village, separated by the M3 motorway and some adjoining meadows and fields. The second of the borough's Green Belt SSSIs, Sheep Walk Meadows, is a key feature of Shepperton Green, bounding it, to its south. A Saxon and medieval burial ground gives its name to the Saxon Junior School who use it for playing fields and has Scheduled status. A farm combined with a significant amount of fishing and gravel lakes form the outskirts and within the clustered settlement an estate of the homes was built as non-serving personally barracks for the British Army.

== Demography and housing ==
=== Historic figures ===
The population of Shepperton, according to the census of 1801, was 731. This number increased gradually to 858 forty years later, increasing further to the end of the 19th century. Between 1891 and 1901 its population rose by 511 to 1,810. The population also rose substantially between 1931 and 1951, to 6,060 people. Data for 1801–1951 is available at Britain Through Time. The 2001 and 2011 censuses give detailed information about the Town ward and Shepperton Green (Note: Two lower-level Output Areas, the ward was revived in 2011.).

Population of Shepperton
Year	1801	1811	1821	1831	1841	1851	1881	1891
Population	731	751	782	847	858	807	1285	1299
Year	1901	1911	1921	1931	1941	1951	2001	2011
Population	1810	2337	2858	3424	n/a	6060	9554	9753

=== Other ===
The settlement had 9,753 residents, living in 4,301 households. Of those, 83.6% of residents described their health as 'good', for this overall figure, above the regional average. Of these people 47.3% described their health as very good, below the regional average. 20.4% of 16- to 74-year-olds had no work qualifications, below the English average of 22.5%. In 2011 the area had only 114 people who were in the category "never worked/long-term unemployed".

=== Housing, area and population ===
2011 Census Homes
Super Output area	Detached	Semi-detached	Terraced	Flats and apartments	Caravans/temporary/mobile homes	Shared between households
Shepperton Green west	111	288	168	44	1	0
Shepperton Green east	73	408	89	7	2	0
Old Shepperton and west	477	250	211	112	1	0
North-east	225	140	39	98	29	0
Lower Halliford and Marina	236	341	83	117	1	0
Centre and Las Palmas estate	226	143	206	77	27	0

The average level of accommodation in the region composed of detached houses was 28%, the average that was apartments was 22.6%.

Super Output area	Population	Households	% Owned outright	% Owned with a loan	hectares
Shepperton Green west	1,566	617	44.1	44.1	101
Shepperton Green east	1,510	647	26.7	38.3	57
Old Shepperton and west	1,756	783	55.7	33.7	290
North-east	1,871	767	41.1	43.2	44
Lower Halliford and Marina	1,472	689	48	36.6	155
Centre and Las Palmas estate	1,578	808	41.7	30.8	51

The proportion of households in the settlement who owned their home outright compares to the regional average of 35.1%. The proportion who owned their home with a loan compares to the regional average of 32.5%. The remaining % is made up of rented dwellings (plus a negligible % of households living rent-free).

== Culture ==
=== Film ===
==== Shepperton Studios ====
Shepperton Studios is home to a multi-disciplinary film production facility from on-set, through to television and various forms of animation. This also acts as a base for on-location film work for television dramas in the South East and in films, for instance for productions partly shot in the Burnham Beeches woods less than 10 miles (16 km) away. These adjoin Shepperton Green, in the now negligible village of Littleton. In the 1930s its Littleton manor's core, which covered 60 acres (24 ha) was converted into film production lots. Works produced or shot wholly or in part on its 15 stages, other lots or in its extensive animation facilities since the new millennium include:

- Billy Elliot, Chocolat, Gladiator (2000)
- Bridget Jones's Diary, Gosford Park (2001), Spy Game (2001)
- About a Boy, Bend It Like Beckham (2002)
- Love Actually (2003)
- Alexander, Harry Potter and the Prisoner of Azkaban, Troy, Wimbledon (2004)
- Batman Begins, Harry Potter and the Goblet of Fire, Sahara, Star Wars: Episode III – Revenge of the Sith (2005)
- The Da Vinci Code (2006)
- Atonement, Elizabeth: The Golden Age, The Golden Compass (2007)
- Inkheart, Moon, Nine, The Young Victoria (2009)
- Clash of the Titans, Robin Hood (2010)
- Captain America: The First Avenger, Hugo (2011)
- Anna Karenina, John Carter (2012)
- Fast & Furious 6, Gravity, Thor: The Dark World (2013)

==== Halliford Studios ====
Lower Halliford, a completely contiguous so also integral part of Shepperton, used to be home to Halliford Film Studios, opposite the Manygate Lane conservation area, built in 1955 and one of the first film studios devoted to TV commercial production. It was an independent film studio used for commercials, small television productions and other short "promos". The studio was recently closed and demolished.

=== Literature ===
George Eliot depicted Shepperton as set out above.

Shepperton was the home of author J. G. Ballard, the so-called "Seer of Shepperton", and provides the setting for his novels Crash (in which a couple become sexually aroused through car crashes and was written as the M3 motorway was being built past the end of his street) and The Unlimited Dream Company. (Note: Lived in his semi-detached house in Shepperton for over fifty years until his death in 2009)

Shepperton is mentioned in the novel The War of the Worlds by H. G. Wells. It is also mentioned in the novel Oliver Twist by Charles Dickens.

=== Fine art ===
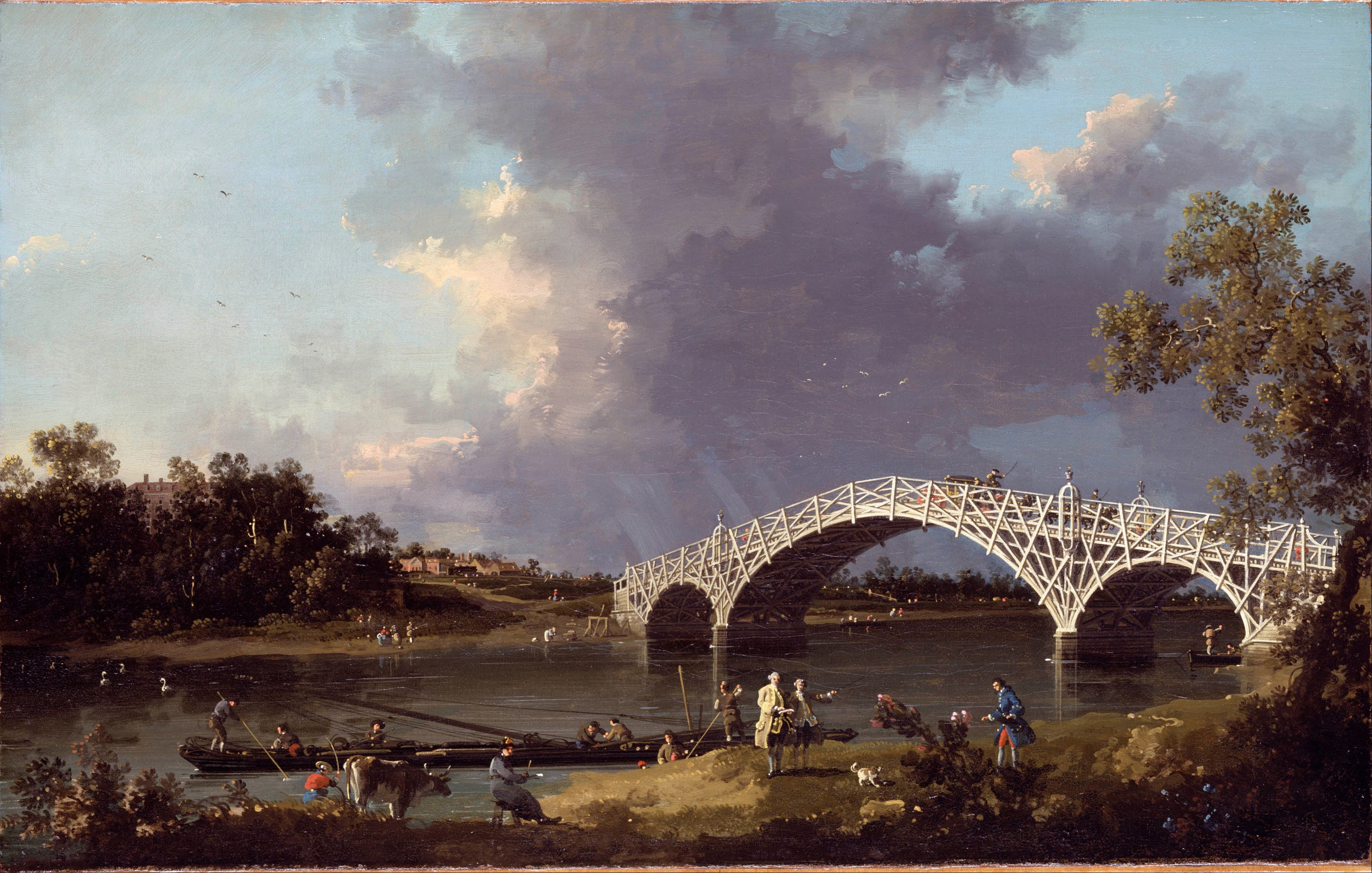
Canaletto - A View of Walton Bridge

J. M. W. Turner painted in 1805 two scenes of the shimmering river and fishermen on the far banks of the Lower Halliford part of Shepperton including the wide landscape work Walton Bridges widely exhibited in 1807 following a previous similar work by Canaletto of the scene in 1754.

== Sport and recreation ==
There are recreation grounds for football on both sides of the M3: one in Shepperton Green and two in Shepperton/Lower Halliford; one has adjoining tennis courts. Through the town there is the Thames Path and there are popular adjacent flat cycling routes to Windsor, Hampton Court Palace and Richmond. There is a golf course north of the station in the historic parish of Sunbury so anachronistically named Sunbury Golf Club and for a time American Golf at Sunbury with two courses, a driving range and Crown Golf Academy as Sunbury is a larger settlement.

Desborough Sailing Club is based here with its own dinghy basin, private inlet and secluded reach of the river Thames and international medal-winner training club Queen Mary Reservoir Sailing Club lies between Shepperton and Ashford.

Angling is substantial at Halliford Mere fisheries and on the River Thames itself.

Shepperton has a cricket club, which has teams in the Fullers Surrey County League.

== Places of worship ==
There are several churches in the village covering three denominations of Christianity.

The architecturally listed stone-clad church to St Nicholas on the preserved village square (Church of England) is led by the rector of Shepperton, Rev Chris Swift.

Founded in 1936, St John Fisher Roman Catholic church led by Fr Shaun Richards places emphasis on helping the housebound and sick, CAFOD and takes part in the Westminster Diocese pilgrimage to Lourdes.

Jubilee Church, Shepperton was formed as a new church in 1982 to celebrate in modern "mainstream Christianity" being less focussed on ceremony than the two oldest UK churches.

Littleton has a co-led Church of England; Upper Halliford has a Baptist church.

== Notable people ==
Notable residents past and present include:

- Ian Allan, publisher of railway books
- Olivia Anderson, South African international cricketer
- Celestine Babayaro, Nigerian footballer
- J. G. Ballard, English novelist, short story writer and essayist
- Lynne Reid Banks, late 20th century author with children's best-seller The Indian in the Cupboard (1980) with four sequels and adult novels such as The L-Shaped Room (1960)
- John Boorman, film director
- Bernard Braden and Barbara Kelly, television presenters and producers.
- Ray Dorset, lead singer of Mungo Jerry and songwriter of chart-topper Feels Like I'm in Love
- Robert Faurisson, French academic (1929-2018)
- Frank Finlay, actor
- John Gregson, actor and his wife Thea Gregory, actress
- Walter Hayes, Ford public relations executive instrumental in developing the company's Formula One programme
- Steve Holley, Paul McCartney's drummer in 'Wings'
- Tom Jones, singer
- Janet Munro, actress, and Ian Hendry, actor, lived on Pharaoh's Island in Shepperton
- Janek Schaefer, British Composer of the Year in Sonic Art has a studio in Shepperton, 'innerspaces' inspired by J.G.Ballard
- Ruth Wilson, actress

== Notes and references ==
Notes
