= Littleton, Spelthorne =

Coordinates: 51°24′18″N 0°27′43″W

Littleton
- Village
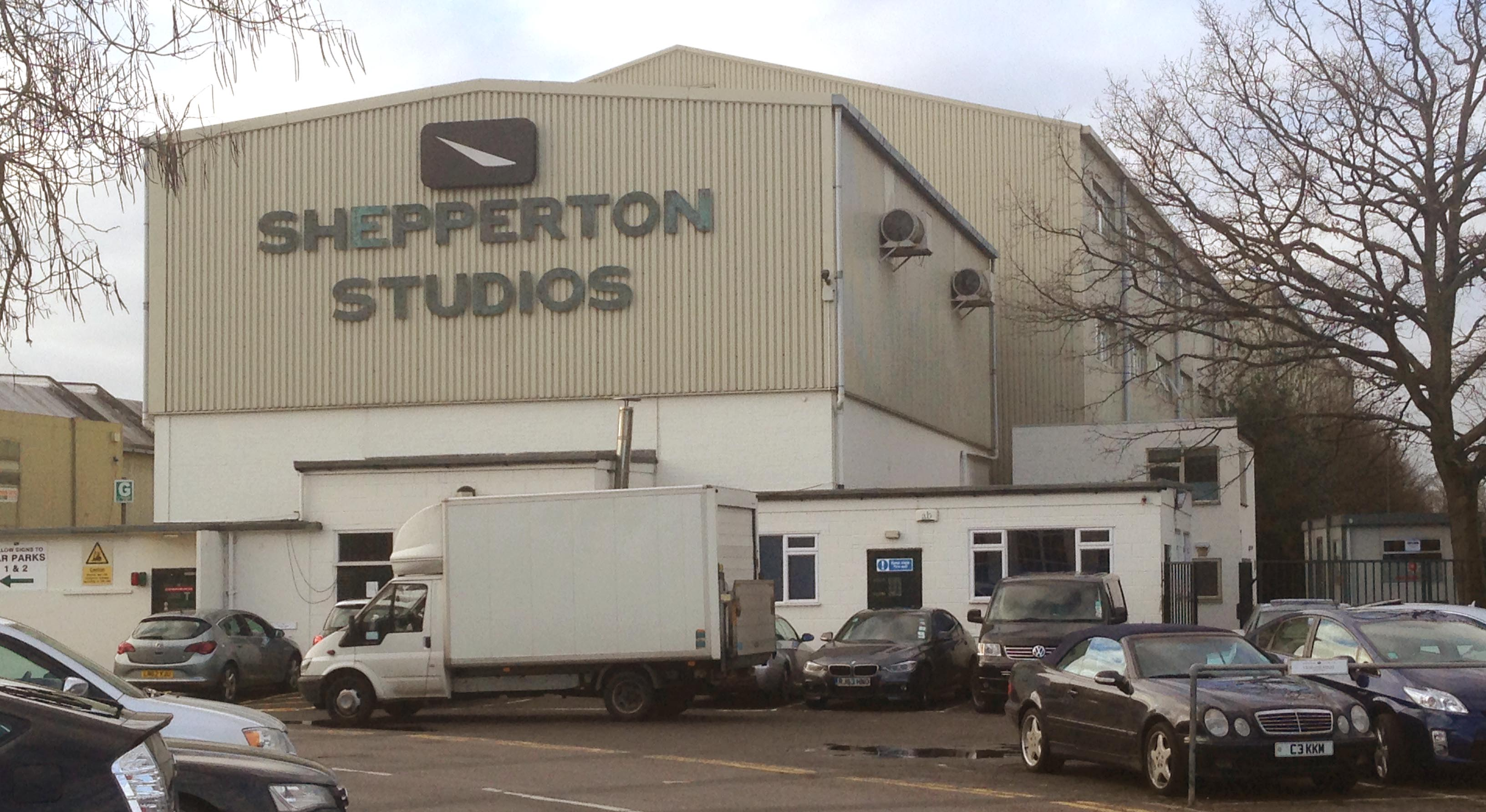
- Shepperton Studios

- Location within Surrey
- Area: 0.4 sq mi (1.0 km^{2})
- Population: 700 (2011 census approximation)
  - Density: 1,750/sq mi (680/km^{2})
- OS grid reference: TQ0668
  - London: 16.5 miles (26.6 km)
- District: Spelthorne
- Shire county: Surrey
- Region: South East
- Country: England
- Sovereign state: United Kingdom
- Post town: Shepperton
- Postcode district: TW17
- Dialling code: 01932
- Police: Surrey
- Fire: Surrey
- Ambulance: South East Coast
- UK Parliament: Spelthorne

Littleton is a village in the borough of Spelthorne, approximately 16 mi (26 km) west of central London. Historically part of the county of Middlesex, it was transferred to Surrey in 1965. It is the location of Shepperton Studios.

The village is separated from Shepperton by the River Ash, which runs along its southern boundary. Queen Mary Reservoir, built in 1931, is to the north. Littleton borders Laleham to the west and Charlton, which is also in the post town of Shepperton, is 0.5 miles (800 m) to the north-east. The parish church of St Mary Magdalene is a Grade I listed building.

London Heathrow Airport is 5 miles (8 km) north of Littleton. The nearest railway station is Shepperton.

== History ==
=== Early recorded history ===
Court rolls such as manorial rolls and Letters Patent give early versions Lutleton and Litlinton in the 13th century; Lutlyngton, Littelyngton, Littelton in the next, and Lytelyngton in the 16th century.

In 1341 the parish was rated at £9 6s. 8d., but because the land was sandy, and the inhabitants were unable to sow it on account of their poverty – only £6 could be raised.

In 1951 the civil parish had a population of 918. On 1 April 1974 the parish was abolished.

=== Ownership of the manorial land ===
Littleton Manor

Littleton is first mentioned by name and it was mentioned as such as a manor in 1165–67, when it was held as one knight's fee in among the barony of William Blunt, Baron of Ixworth, whose father Gilbert had also held it. In the Second Barons' War, his namesake and heir died at the Battle of Evesham in 1265. For the following three centuries right up to the dissolution of the monasteries a mesne lordship, providing intermediate revenues in the hierarchical structure was a right belonging to Westminster Abbey. Seated elsewhere, the Blunts let the manor to the (de) Littleton then (de) Leveland families. The latter briefly became the de Grendon family before reverting name and whose descendants by a sole female heir's marriage became Sench. In 1351 Roger Sapurton succeeded, as with the Leveland heir his father having been custodian of Westminster Palace and the Fleet Prison. By marriage, William Venour acquired it, keeper of the Fleet in 1440 before seemingly passing to Ellen Markham née Sapurton, who conveyed it (sold it) with her husband Robert in 1528 to Anthony Windesore or Windsor, of the landed Windsor family of Stanwell. In 1573 it was sold to Thomas Newdigate whose family married Anne Seymour, the Duchess of Somerset and whole offspring, the Earls of Hertford held it until sale in 1627. Later owners included Moore, Goodlad, and Lambell before selling it to Thomas Wood MP, owners of the second manor in the parish, that of Astlam (or Astleham) in 1783. This family held it until at least 1911. One such owner was General Sir David Wood (1812–94), the son of Colonel Thomas Wood of Littleton. He served in the Boer campaign of 1842–3, and commanded the Royal Artillery at Balaclava, Inkerman, and Sebastopol, and the Horse Artillery in the Indian Mutiny.

Astlam Manor

First mention is in 1600, when Katharine Ryse, widow, conveyed the manor to Francis Townley. Nicholas Townley held it in 1650–1 but sold it in 1660 to the Wood family. An extent of that year reveals a brick-built manor house, outhouses, barns, stables, dovehouse, mill-houses, orchards, gardens and tenants' private back lots.

Other land

Other land, in particular, tenements belonged to early Lord Beauchamps, early 15th century co-heirs, Elizabeth Beauchamp (married Urias Seymour) and Cicely Beauchamp (married Sir Roger Seymour), with these smaller holdings thus owned by the Seymour family, devolving to combined heir Edward Seymour, 1st Duke of Somerset before the 1573 purchase of the manor outright.

Ownership of the rectory

The rectory with associated land (glebe) was never sold to an acquisitive monastery, abbeys or college of Oxford and Cambridge. As such it passed per the whim of the person holding the advowson (right to appoint the rector, here mostly through family lines however, twice seized by the monarch). The advowson alone passed to the Priory of Hounslow between 1372 and 1537. In 1610 the advowson was granted by James I to William Hughes, it seems who was a fishing grantee. Later in the same year he and his father Reginald conveyed their right to Francis Townley, but the Earl of Hertford, a Seymour, presented in 1616 and 1617. Litigation ensued and Francis Townley recovered his right of presentation from the Earl: the rector, who had been inducted in 1617, was admitted a second time (in 1619) on Townley's presentation. As there is still a continuous rector, this negates the possibility of chancel repair liability in the historic parish.

=== 19th century to date ===
In 1848, based on the most recent census there were 111 inhabitants who mostly farmed its 1,060 acres (430 ha) of arable and pasture land, much of which, as "a light gravel", was brought into cultivation "comparatively recently"; the surface was flat, and the lands bordering on the river Thames still subject to partial flooding – this was in 1935 by building the Desborough Cut. The rectory having been valued in 1548 at £14, by 1848 had glebe of 50 acres (20 ha), tithes on the rest so had a large net income of £320 (and had patron, Thomas Wood, sen.).

Church charities operated in 1911, endowed historically by:

- Mrs Elizabeth Wood
- Robert Wood, LL.D. (1737)
- The estate of Lieutenant-General David Wood (1872)
- Rev. Thomas Harwood, DD, rector (1731)
- Thomas Wood and Thomas Wood, junior
- Edward Elton
- Rev. Henry Allen, DD, rector

Littleton House, destroyed, was built for Thomas Wood, ranger of Hampton Court under William III in the 1820s and burnt down in 1874, thereby destroying also Actors Dressing, a painting by William Hogarth. Although a small replacement was built this was divided into, in the 20th century, a staggered terraced estate and the front studios of Shepperton Studios.

Littleton was in 1860 a parish of inverse shape to Shepperton (which held in all but Shepperton Green close to the Thames), by forming roughly an inverse triangle. Its main area was where the reservoir is north of a narrow strip which tapered down to Chertsey Bridge on the River Thames.

Littleton contributed most of the 707 acres (286 ha) covered by Queen Mary Reservoir, the construction of which began in 1931.

In 1911 the historian William Page said in the Victoria County History of the County of Middlesex:

"The village is one of the least spoilt in the county. It is built almost entirely of red brick, and presents a cheerful and peaceful aspect as it clusters about the church. There has never been either public house or shop in the parish, and the only trade represented is that of the blacksmith. ... There are 1138 acres in the parish, of which 325 acres are arable, 524 acres are permanent grass, and 270 acres are woodland, and 19 acres are water. (fn. 8) The population is principally dependent on agriculture. The soil is sandy loam, and the subsoil gravel. The chief crops are wheat, barley, clover, mangold-wurzel, peas, and beans."

Littleton saw three radical changes in the middle of 20th century: agriculture being limited to two farms (one run from beyond the village boundary), the surrender of most of its land to build the reservoir, and the construction of more homes. The village is for most purposes a residential, somewhat inseparable, very green-buffered part of Shepperton.

== Landmarks ==
Shepperton Studios covers most of the west of Littleton, and has used some of the River Ash and adjoining woodland in certain feature films.

Littleton Manor was home to the Wood family: Thomas Wood was elected to Parliament in the 18th century. It is a Grade II* listed building.

Astleham Manor Cottage in large grounds survives by the Ash with remaining woodland to its north. It is a Grade II listed building.

=== Parish church ===
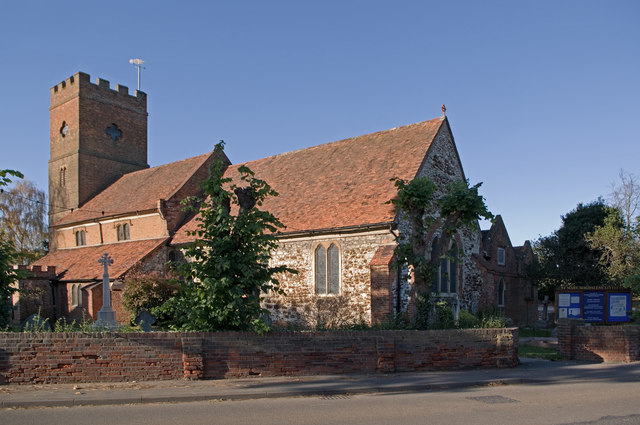
St Mary Magdalene parish church from the south, showing the 16th-century Tudor west tower and nave clerestory

The Church of England parish church of St Mary Magdalene is now part of a united benefice with the parish of St Nicholas, Shepperton.

The building is Grade I listed. The chancel and south aisle are 13th-century, on 12th-century foundations. The north aisle is 14th-century. In the 16th century the west tower and nave clerestory were built. In the tower are three bells cast in 1666 by William I Eldridge, who had bell-foundries at Wokingham and Chertsey. Early in the 18th century the fourth stage of the tower was added. On the north side of the chancel are two vestries: the first added in 1705 and the second about 1730.

Fittings include 15th-century choir stalls with cusped ogee arches and panelling in the spandrels said to have come from Winchester, a complete set of late medieval pews, restored, and very restored rood screen of circa 1500, fine Flemish altar rails with C-scroll carving on the newels, very deep rich carving depicting the 10 commandments and eagles in chancel of circa 1700, an early Georgian wooden pulpit with arcaded tracery and small narrow high window into the south-east angle between nave and chancel to provide light, an Octagonal stone font with elaborate quatrefoil pierced and crocketed font cover of ogee domed section above, on a square pier, a hatchment on North tower wall.

In the nave there used to be a set of six Italian Trecento pilaster panel paintings, painted in about 1365–70 and attributed to Jacopo di Cione and his workshop. Each depicts a different Christian figure: the evangelists John and Luke, the monks Anthony the Great and Peter Damian, and two members of the Camaldolese order: Beata Paola (died 1368) and Bruno Bonifacio. How they came to be at the church is not known. They were first recorded early in the 19th century by the art collector William Young Ottley (1771–1836). Since about 2009 they have been on loan to the National Gallery.

In the 1830s the Wood family had 24 colours of the Grenadier Guards hung in the chancel. In 2012 they were taken down and presented to The Guards Museum at Wellington Barracks.

==== Former chantry ====
Its chantry was founded in 1324 by Thomas de Littleton, then rector of Harrow, and formerly rector of Spaxton. By his agreement with the Abbot and Convent of Chertsey, they bound the abbey to pay 5 marks yearly to a chaplain to celebrate divine service daily at the altar of St. Mary in the church of Littleton, in honour of the saint, and for the souls of the founder, of his parents, and of Simon de Micham. The chaplain was to be appointed by Thomas de Littleton, and after his death by Sir Geoffrey de Perkelee, the rector of Littleton, and his successors. In 1547–48 the chantry was last served by a French priest, Sir Philip Lyniard, who had a house, an orchard, and a little croft or close. However, the Dissolution of Chantries Act 1547 preceded the dissolution of the monasteries the following year and split between the lord of the manor and rector.

== Demography and housing ==
2011 Census Homes
Super Output area	Detached	Semi-detached	Terraced	Flats and apartments	Caravans/temporary/mobile homes	Shared between households
Spelthorne 012B	155	98	207	126	2	0

The average level of accommodation in the region composed of detached houses was 28%, the average that was apartments was 22.6%.

Super Output area	Population	Households	% Owned outright	% Owned with a loan	hectares
Littleton and Charlton	1,587	656	40.5	45.1	128

The proportion of households in the settlement who owned their home outright compares to the regional average of 35.1%. The proportion who owned their home with a loan compares to the regional average of 32.5%. The remaining % is made up of rented dwellings (plus a negligible % of households living rent-free).

The most relevant super output area is Spelthorne 012B. Land in and around the film studios, and slopes of the reservoir which still figure as the Littleton side of it, whether within the ward of Shepperton Green and Laleham or parish is excluded from the output area, but is replaced with Littleton's gravel pit and the west of Charlton.

== Notes and references ==
Notes
