= 2023 Spelthorne Borough Council election =

Election

- 4 May 2023

All 39 seats to Spelthorne Borough Council 20 seats needed for a majority
- Registered: 77,255
- Turnout: 24,293 (31.4%)

	First party	Second party	Third party
Leader	John Boughtflower	Sandra Dunn
Party	Conservative	Liberal Democrats	Independent
Leader's seat	Shepperton Town	Halliford & Sunbury West
Last election	23 seats, 46.3%	8 seats, 17.5%	2 seats, 4.2%
Seats before	15	8	8 (Note: Of the eight independent councillors prior to the election, four sat as the "United Spelthorne" group led by Ian Harvey, two sat as the "Independent Spelthorne" group led by Joanne Sexton, one (Ian Beardsmore) was affiliated to the Conservative group and one (Bob Noble) was affiliated to the Green group.)
Seats won	12	10	7
Seat change	▼11	▲2	▲6
Popular vote	24,720	11,893	11,363
Percentage	38.6%	18.6%	17.7%
Swing	▼7.7%	▲1.1%	▲13.6%
	Fourth party	Fifth party	Sixth party
Leader	Sue Doran	Malcolm Beecher	Veena Siva
Party	Labour	Green	Breakthrough Party
Leader's seat	Stanwell North	Staines	Staines
Last election	4 seats, 15.9%	2 seats, 8.8%	N/A
Seats before	3	3	2
Seats won	7	3	0
Seat change	▲3	▲1	Steady
Popular vote	8,696	6,927	N/A
Percentage	13.6%	10.8%	N/A
Swing	▼2.3%	▲2.0%	N/A
- Winner of each seat at the 2023 Spelthorne Borough Council election
Leader before election
John Boughtflower
Conservative
No overall control
Leader after election
Joanne Sexton
Independent
No overall control

The 2023 Spelthorne Borough Council election took place on 4 May 2023 to elect members of Spelthorne Borough Council in Surrey, England. This was on the same day as other local elections across England.

Prior to the election the council was under no overall control, being led by a Conservative minority administration. The Conservatives had won a majority of the seats at the previous election in 2019 but had lost their majority in 2020 following a number of defections. Following the 2023 election the council remained under no overall control. At the subsequent annual council meeting on 25 May 2023, independent councillor Jo Sexton was appointed leader of the council, with Liberal Democrat councillor Chris Bateson serving as deputy leader.

== Summary ==
=== Election result ===
2023 Spelthorne Borough Council election
Party	Candidates	Seats	Gains	Losses	Net gain/loss	Seats %	Votes %	Votes	+/−
Conservative	39	12	0	12	▼11	30.7	38.6	24,720	–7.7
Liberal Democrats	14	10	2	0	▲2	25.6	18.6	11,893	+1.1
Independent	18	7	5	0	▲5	17.9	17.7	11,363	+13.6
Labour	14	7	6	1	▲3	17.9	13.6	8,696	–2.3
Green	10	3	4	0	▲1	7.7	10.8	6,927	+2.0
TUSC	3	0	0	0	Steady	0.0	0.1	37	N/A
Reform	2	0	0	0	Steady	0.0	0.5	350	N/A

== Ward results ==
The results were declared on the 5 May 2023. The results were as follows, with an asterisk (*) indicating an incumbent councillor standing for re-election:

=== Ashford Common ===
Ashford Common (3 seats)
Party	Candidate	Votes	%	±%
Conservative	Simon Bhadye	783	40.7	−10.9
Conservative	Naz Islam	781	40.6	−6.0
Independent	Katherine Rutherford	773	40.2	N/A
Conservative	Jugjit Matharu	709	36.9	−4.7
Independent	David Alexander	706	36.7	N/A
Labour	Andrew Lamb	491	25.5	+5.2
Liberal Democrats	Alan Mockford	490	25.5	+4.4
Rejected ballots		6		
Registered electors		6,473		
Turnout		1,929	29.8	+2.7
Conservative hold				
Conservative hold				
Independent gain from Conservative				

=== Ashford East ===
Ashford East (3 seats)
Party	Candidate	Votes	%	±%
Independent	Joanne Sexton**	991	50.7	N/A
Independent	Elizabeth Baldock	776	39.7	N/A
Conservative	Rose Chandler*	714	36.5	−8.3
Conservative	Keith Robinson	615	31.5	−15.4
Conservative	Vandana Tuteja	544	27.8	−14.7
Independent	John Enright	467	23.9	N/A
Labour	Gerald Dare	442	22.6	+1.4
Green	Chris Hyde	319	16.3	−12.2
Independent	Gerald Gravett	265	13.6	N/A
Green	Nigel Scott	253	12.8	N/A
Rejected ballots		3		
Registered electors		5,880		
Turnout		1,958	33.3	
Independent gain from Conservative				
Independent gain from Conservative				
Conservative hold				

Joanne Sexton was an incumbent in Ashford North and Stanwell South having defected from Conservative.

=== Ashford North & Stanwell South ===
Ashford North & Stanwell South (3 seats)
Party	Candidate	Votes	%	±%
Labour	Sean Beatty	728	43.3	+7.9
Labour	Rebecca Geach	695	41.3	+6.0
Labour	Med Buck	671	39.9	+7.8
Conservative	Sonia Maya	511	30.4	−13.5
Conservative	Amar Brar*	506	30.1	−7.8
Conservative	Julie Fegredo	497	29.5	−10.4
Independent	Chris Davies	421	25.0	N/A
Independent	Jason Lane	395	23.5	N/A
Reform	Marian Rough	178	10.6	N/A
Rejected ballots		4		
Registered electors		6,748		
Turnout		1,687	25	+2.7
Labour gain from Conservative				
Labour gain from Conservative				
Labour gain from Conservative				

=== Ashford Town ===
Ashford Town (3 seats)
Party	Candidate	Votes	%	±%
Independent	Michelle Arnold	801	39.2	N/A
Conservative	Olivia Rybinski*	725	35.5	−8.9
Green	Andrew McLuskey	677	33.1	−1.1
Conservative	Nick Gething*	653	31.9	−17.0
Conservative	Paul Woodward	651	31.8	−11.5
Labour	Mark Kluth	571	27.9	−3.8
Green	Dene Winch	548	26.8	+4.8
Independent	Robin Henfrey	519	25.4	N/A
Independent	Quentin Edgington	499	24.4	N/A
Rejected ballots		1		
Registered electors		5,948		
Turnout		2,046	34.4	
Independent gain from Conservative				
Conservative hold				
Green gain from Conservative				

=== Halliford & Sunbury West ===
Halliford & Sunbury West (3 seats)
Party	Candidate	Votes	%	±%
Liberal Democrats	Sandra Dunn*	1,014	63.5	+9.5
Liberal Democrats	Lawrence Nichols*	921	57.6	+14.4
Liberal Democrats	John Turner	833	52.1	+4.6
Conservative	Michael Brennan	489	30.6	−1.7
Conservative	Anna Nowicka	489	30.6	+2.1
Conservative	Paul Robigo	477	29.8	+0.8
Labour	Roger Bowen	281	17.6	+6.0
Rejected ballots		12		
Registered electors		4,924		
Turnout		1,610	32.7	–3.7
Liberal Democrats hold				
Liberal Democrats hold				
Liberal Democrats hold				

=== Laleham & Shepperton Green ===
Laleham & Shepperton Green (3 seats)
Party	Candidate	Votes	%	±%
Conservative	Karen Howkins*	945	50.2	−1.4
Conservative	Darren Clarke	878	46.6	+3.3
Conservative	Anant Mathur	710	37.7	−3.7
Green	Stuart Whitmore*	673	35.7	+7.1
Green	Jill Beecher	614	32.6	N/A
Liberal Democrats	John Thesiger	470	25.0	+1.4
Labour	Pierre Cooper	378	20.1	−0.3
Independent	John Johnston	192	10.2	N/A
TUSC	Andy Pattinson	65	3.5	N/A
TUSC	Helen Couchman	55	2.9	N/A
TUSC	Paul Couchman	37	2.0	N/A
Rejected ballots		9		
Registered electors		6,265		
Turnout		1,892	30.2	+1.5
Conservative hold				
Conservative hold				
Conservative hold				

=== Riverside & Laleham ===
Riverside & Laleham (3 seats)
Party	Candidate	Votes	%	±%
Independent	Denise Saliagopoulos*	1,191	56.1	+8.0
Independent	Daniel Geraci	1,046	49.3	N/A
Liberal Democrats	Michele Gibson*	1,022	48.1	+9.6
Conservative	Sinead Mooney*	754	35.5	−3.0
Conservative	Keith Malcouronne	661	31.1	−3.3
Conservative	Michael Zenonos	619	29.2	+1.2
Rejected ballots		5		
Registered electors		5,374		
Turnout		2,128	39.6	
Independent hold				
Independent gain from Conservative				
Liberal Democrats gain from Conservative				

=== Shepperton Town ===
Shepperton Town (3 seats)
Party	Candidate	Votes	%	±%
Conservative	Maureen Attewell**	1,194	57.6	−1.9
Conservative	Lisa Brennan	955	46.0	−8.6
Conservative	John Boughtflower**	920	44.4	−8.6
Green	Peter Hughes	694	33.5	+6.6
Liberal Democrats	Martin Gammon	672	32.4	+12.0
Labour Co-op	Stephen Bentley	555	26.8	+14.4
Independent	Sue Bryer	423	20.4	N/A
Rejected ballots		8		
Registered electors		5,642		
Turnout		2,082	36.9	–2.8
Conservative hold				
Conservative hold				
Conservative hold				

Maureen Attewell was a sitting councillor for Laleham and Shepperton Green John Boughtflower was a sitting councillor for Ashford East

=== Staines ===
Staines (3 seats)
Party	Candidate	Votes	%	±%
Green	Malcolm Beecher*	1,222	57.4	+5.1
Green	Adam Gale	1,169	54.9	+7.3
Independent	Howard Williams (Note: Member of the Independent Spelthorne Group) **	942	44.2	N/A
Labour	Khalid Mustafa	740	34.7	+0.9
Conservative	Mark Francis	537	25.2	−8.5
Conservative	Trudy Burgess	474	22.3	−11.0
Conservative	Adrian Ulisse	343	16.1	−16.3
Rejected ballots		9		
Registered electors		6,856		
Turnout		2,139	31.2	+1.3
Green hold				
Green hold				
Independent gain from Labour				

Williams was a sitting Conservative Councillor for Riverside and Laleham ward, having held responsibility for Finance and Customer Service.

=== Staines South ===
Staines South (3 seats)
Party	Candidate	Votes	%	±%
Liberal Democrats	Chris Bateson*	1,171	71.3	+21.5
Liberal Democrats	Jolyon Caplin	1,064	64.8	+16.5
Labour	Tony Burrell	769	46.8	+17.0
Conservative	Kathy Hurst	437	26.6	+1.0
Conservative	Maurice Watts	383	23.3	±0.0
Conservative	Graeme Reid	337	20.5	−2.8
Rejected ballots		7		
Registered electors		5,337		
Turnout		1,649	30.9	+0.5
Liberal Democrats hold				
Liberal Democrats hold				
Labour hold				

=== Stanwell North ===
Stanwell North (3 seats)
Party	Candidate	Votes	%	±%
Labour	Susan Doran*	804	53.1	+8.5
Labour	Jon Button*	798	52.7	+16.3
Labour	John Doran*	773	51.0	+8.8
Conservative	Anita McIlroy	632	41.7	+9.8
Conservative	Jim McIlroy	621	41.0	+1.3
Conservative	Rohan Vijjhalwar	476	31.4	+5.3
Rejected ballots		13		
Turnout		1,528	25.8	–1.6
Labour hold				
Labour gain from Conservative				
Labour hold				

=== Sunbury Common ===
Sunbury Common (3 seats)
Party	Candidate	Votes	%	±%
Liberal Democrats	Harry Boparai	828	53.0	+17.5
Liberal Democrats	Mary Bing Dong **	740	47.4	+15.9
Liberal Democrats	Suraj Gyawali	648	41.5	+19.8
Independent	Ian Beardsmore*	608	38.9	−7.9
Independent	Jacqueline Stanton	348	22.3	N/A
Conservative	Simon Rollo	347	22.2	−7.3
Conservative	Jayson Bhadye	283	18.1	−1.1
Conservative	Alex Sapunovas	227	14.5	−3.6
Reform	Rory O'Brien	172	11.0	N/A
Rejected ballots		5		
Registered electors		6,078		
Turnout		1,562	25.7	–3.0
Liberal Democrats gain from Independent				
Liberal Democrats hold				
Liberal Democrats hold				

=== Sunbury East ===
Sunbury East (3 seats)
Party	Candidate	Votes	%	±%
Liberal Democrats	Kathy Grant*	1,068	51.6	+8.7
Conservative	Buddhi Weerasinghe	967	46.7	−1.5
Conservative	Matthew Lee	960	46.4	−0.9
Liberal Democrats	Michael Alexiou	952	46.0	+7.6
Conservative	Jay Patel	852	41.1	−1.2
Green	Daniel Dollin	758	36.6	N/A
Rejected ballots		12		
Registered electors		5,851		
Turnout		2,083	35.6	+3.0
Liberal Democrats hold				
Conservative hold				
Conservative hold				

== Changes 2023–2027 ==
- April 2024: Mary Bing Dong left the Liberal Democrats to join the Conservative Party; she subsequently left the Conservatives to sit as an independent on 16 February 2026.

=== By-elections ===
==== Ashford Town ====
By-election triggered by the resignation of Green councillor Andrew McLuskey.

Ashford Town by-election, 6 September 2023
Party	Candidate	Votes	%	±%
Conservative	Paul Norman Woodward	562	37.5	+5.7
Independent	John Anthony Cornelius Enright	420	28.0	N/A
Green	Stuart John Whitmore	252	16.8	−16.3
Labour	Mark Joseph Kluth	212	14.1	−13.8
Reform	Rory O'Brien	35	2.3	N/A
TUSC	Paul Dennis Couchman	19	1.3	N/A
Turnout			25.13	
Conservative gain from Green				

==== Ashford East ====
The by-election was triggered by the resignation of Independent Spelthorne Group councillor Elizabeth Baldock, who stepped down due to ill health.

Ashford East by-election, 4 July 2024
Party	Candidate	Votes	%	±%
Conservative	Sinead Mooney	973	27.4	N/A
Independent	Philip Baldock	870	24.5	N/A
Labour	Jared Kidd	790	22.2	N/A
Reform	Paul Brew	575	16.2	N/A
Liberal Democrats	Satpal Thethy	343	9.7	N/A
Majority		103	2.9	N/A
Turnout			59	
Rejected ballots		10		
Conservative gain from Independent				

==== Ashford Town ====
The by-election was triggered by the resignation of Conservative councillor Olivia Rybinski, who had moved to Cornwall and said the lack of any maternity leave for councillors left her with no choice but to resign ahead of the birth of her third child.

Ashford Town by-election, 19 June 2025
Party	Candidate	Votes	%	±%
Liberal Democrats	Gregory Matthew Neall	539	27.4	+27.4
Reform	Jason Ian Gelver	459	23.4	+23.4
Conservative	Alex Balkan	374	19.0	−18.5
Independent	Philip Baldock	359	18.3	−9.7
Labour	Rhiannon Lewis	234	11.9	−2.2
Turnout		1,965	32.6	−1.8
Registered electors		6,045		
Liberal Democrats gain from Conservative		Swing	+22.95	

Liberal Democrats last contested the ward of Ashford town in 2007.

==== Staines ====
The by-election was triggered by the resignation of Green councillor Adam Gale, who moved to Dubai for work.

Staines by-election: 16 October 2025
Party	Candidate	Votes	%	±%
Liberal Democrats	Laura Barker	804	37.9	N/A
Reform	Harry Phillips	499	23.5	N/A
Independent	Sean Freeman	261	12.3	−31.9
Conservative	Mark Francis	231	10.9	−14.3
Green	Stuart Whitmore	163	7.7	−49.7
Labour	Jared Kidd	158	7.4	−27.3
TUSC	Paul Couchman	8	0.4	N/A
Majority		305	14.4	N/A
Turnout		2,124		
Liberal Democrats gain from Green				
