= Borough of Spelthorne =

Spelthorne
- Borough and non-metropolitan district
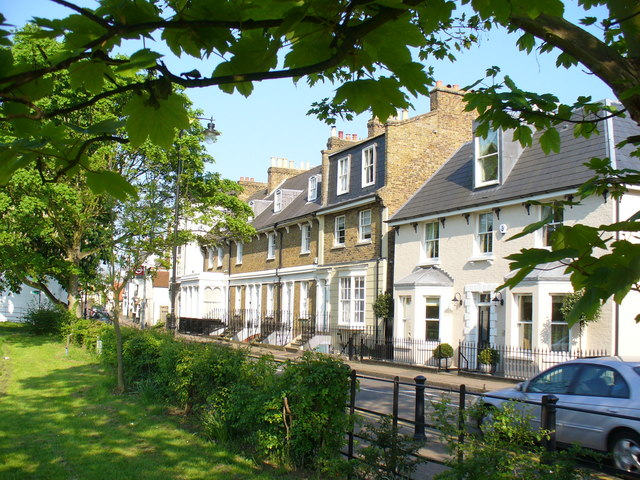
- Thames Street in Sunbury-on-Thames

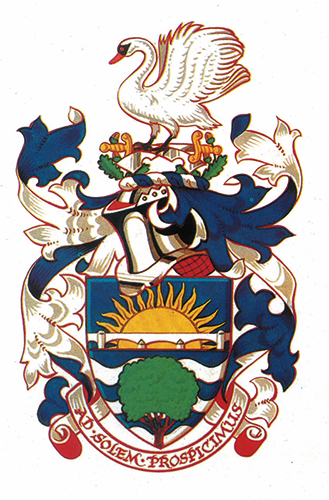
- Coat of arms
- Mottoes: Ad Solem Prospicimus; (Latin: We look towards the Sun)
- Spelthorne shown within Surrey
- Coordinates: 51°26′N 0°30′W
- Sovereign state: United Kingdom
- Constituent country: England
- Region: South East England
- Non-metropolitan county: Surrey
- Historic county: Middlesex
- Status: Non-metropolitan district, Borough
- Incorporated: 1 April 1974
- Admin HQ: Staines-upon-Thames

Government
  - Type: Non-metropolitan district council
  - Body: Spelthorne Borough Council
  - MPs: Lincoln Jopp

Area
  - Total: 19.75 sq mi (51.16 km^{2})
  - Rank: 250th (of 296)

Population (2025)
  - Total: 107,188
  - Rank: 230th (of 296)
  - Density: 5,426/sq mi (2,095/km^{2})

Ethnicity (2021)
  - Ethnic groups: List: 78.7% White; 12.8% Asian; 3.7% Mixed; 2.5% Black; 2.4% other

Religion (2021)
  - Religion: List: 50.9% Christianity; 31.2% no religion; 5.7% not stated; 4.2% Hinduism; 4% Islam; 2.5% Sikhism; 0.7% Buddhism; 0.5% other; 0.2% Judaism
- Time zone: UTC0 (GMT)
  - Summer (DST): UTC+1 (BST)
- ONS code: 43UH (ONS); E07000213 (GSS)
- OS grid reference: TQ045715

Spelthorne is a local government district with borough status in Surrey, England, though historically belonging to Middlesex. Its council is based in Staines-upon-Thames; other settlements in the area include Ashford, Sunbury-on-Thames, Shepperton, Stanwell and Laleham. It is named after the medieval Spelthorne Hundred which had covered the area.

The borough is largely urban; although outside the boundaries of Greater London, it is almost entirely inside the M25 motorway which encircles London. The borough contains several large reservoirs, including the Wraysbury Reservoir, Staines Reservoirs and Queen Mary Reservoir, which all supply fresh water to London and surrounding areas.

The neighbouring districts are Elmbridge, Runnymede, Windsor and Maidenhead, Slough, Hillingdon, Hounslow and Richmond upon Thames, the latter three being London boroughs.

== History ==
The district was created on 1 April 1974 under the Local Government Act 1972, covering two former districts which were both abolished at the same time:

- Staines Urban District
- Sunbury-on-Thames Urban District

These two urban districts had been part of Middlesex prior to 1965, when they had been transferred to the administrative county of Surrey on the creation of Greater London. The new district was named after the medieval hundred of Spelthorne, which had covered the area plus adjoining parts of modern Greater London. The district was awarded borough status from its creation, allowing the chair of the council to take the title of mayor.

The borough ceded a small amount of land in 1995, when Poyle was transferred to Slough. The Spelthorne area was included in the Metropolitan Police District from 1840 until 2000, when it passed to Surrey Police.

Spelthorne remains part of the Church of England Diocese of London and the Roman Catholic Archdiocese of Westminster. The rest of Surrey falls into the Anglican dioceses of Guildford and Southwark, and the Roman Catholic diocese of Arundel and Brighton.

Floods in 2014 caused internal damage to 891 (or 2.2%) of homes in Spelthorne due to record rainfall causing Thames flooding. This compared to internal damage to more than 30% of homes in the neighbouring settlement of Wraysbury in the borough of Windsor and Maidenhead.

In 2014 a campaign group of local business leaders called for the borough, along with others close to the capital, to be transferred from the county of Surrey to Greater London. The proposal was generally opposed by the public and was not pursued.

As part of upcoming structural changes to local government in England, the district will be abolished in April 2027 and the area will become part of the new unitary authority of West Surrey.

== Governance ==
Spelthorne Borough Council

Type
- Type: Non-metropolitan district

Leadership
- Mayor: Sandra Dunn, Liberal Democrat since 20 May 2026
- Leader: Joanne Sexton, Independent since 22 October 2026
- Chief Executive (interim): Gordon Mitchell since 27 February 2026

Structure
- Seats: 39 councillors
- Graph of the party split among 39 seats.
- Political groups: Administration (14) Liberal Democrats (11) Independent (3) Other parties (25) Conservative (14) Labour (6) Independent (4) Green (1)
- Length of term: 4 years

Elections
- Voting system: First-past-the-post
- First election: 7 June 1973
- Last election: 4 May 2023

Meeting place
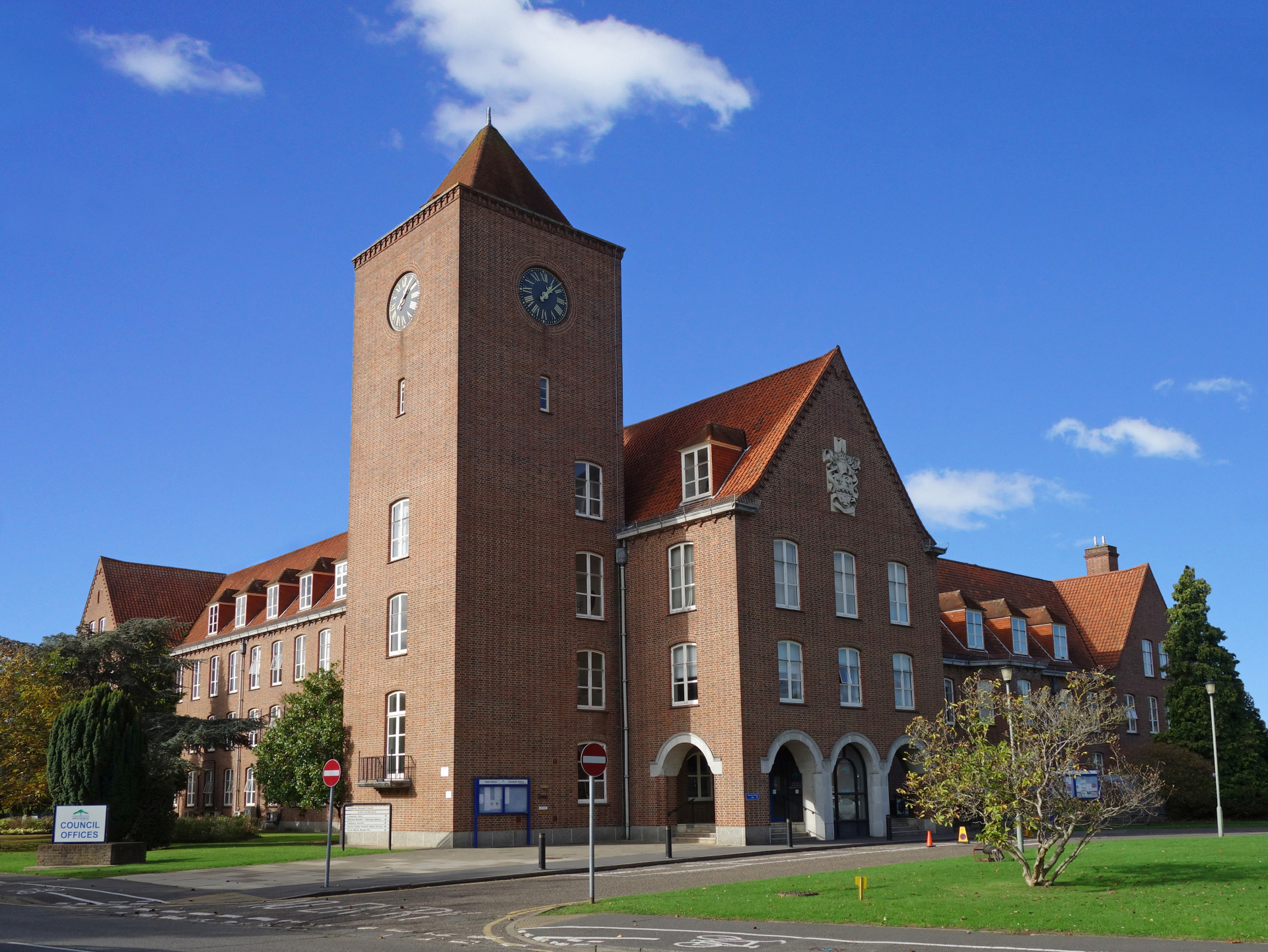
- Council Offices, Knowle Green, Staines-upon-Thames, TW18 1XB

Website
- www.spelthorne.gov.uk

Spelthorne Borough Council provides district-level services. County-level services are provided by Surrey County Council. There are no civil parishes in the borough, which is an unparished area.

On 27 February 2024, Spelthorne Borough Council unveiled their Corporate Plan for 2024–2028, highlighting their key priorities for the next few years.

In September 2023, the council had £1.1 billion in borrowing, with the highest borrowing to income ratio of any council in England. By February 2026, the total debt had been reduced to £715 million.

=== Political control ===
The council has been under no overall control since 2020. An independent-led administration took control of the council in October 2026.

The first elections to the council were held in 1973, initially operating as a shadow authority alongside the outgoing authorities until the new arrangements came into effect on 1 April 1974. Political control of the council since 1974 has been as follows:

| Party in control | Years |
|---|---|
| Conservative | 1974–2020 |
| No overall control | 2020–present |

=== Leadership ===
The role of mayor is largely ceremonial in Spelthorne. Political leadership is instead provided by the leader of the council. The leaders since 1995 have been:

| Councillor | Party | From | To |
|---|---|---|---|
| Gerry Ceaser | Conservative | Nov 1995 | May 1997 |
| Frank Davies | Conservative | May 1997 | May 2005 |
| Gerry Ceaser | Conservative | 19 May 2005 | May 2007 |
| John Packman | Conservative | May 2007 | May 2011 |
| Vivienne Leighton | Conservative | 26 May 2011 | 23 February 2012 |
| Frank Ayers | Conservative | 23 February 2012 | 21 January 2013 |
| Robert Watts | Conservative | 24 January 2013 | 5 October 2015 |
| Quentin Edgington | Conservative | 22 October 2015 | 2 February 2016 |
| Ian Harvey | Conservative | 2 February 2016 | 9 June 2020 |
| Ian Harvey | Independent | 9 June 2020 | 25 June 2020 |
| John Boughtflower | Conservative | 25 June 2020 | 27 May 2021 |
| Lawrence Nichols | Liberal Democrats | 27 May 2021 | May 2022 |
| John Boughtflower | Conservative | 26 May 2022 | May 2023 |
| Joanne Sexton | Independent | 25 May 2023 | 20 May 2026 |
| Greg Neall | Liberal Democrats | 20 May 2026 | 22 October 2026 |
| Joanne Sexton | Independent | 22 October 2026 | |

=== Composition ===
Following the 2023 election and subsequent by-elections and changes of allegiance up to May 2026, the composition of the council was:

| Party | Councillors |
|---|---|
| Conservative | 14 |
| Liberal Democrats | 11 |
| Labour | 6 |
| Green | 1 |
| Independent | 7 |
| Total | 39 |

Five of the independent councillors and the Green councillor sit together as the "Independent Spelthorne Group".

=== Elections ===
Map of wards within the Borough of Spelthorne

Since the last boundary changes in 2003 the council has comprised 39 councillors representing 13 wards, with each ward electing three councillors. Elections were held every four years.

Further borough council elections were cancelled in 2026, and an election for the new West Surrey Council was held instead. West Surrey Council will formally come into being and take over local government functions in the area on 1 April 2027, at which point Spelthorne Borough Council and the borough of Spelthorne will be abolished.

=== Premises ===
The council offices are at Knowle Green in Staines. The building was opened in 1972 for the former Staines Urban District Council, shortly before that council was abolished in 1974 to be replaced by Spelthorne Borough Council.

== Parks, lakes and the River Thames ==
The borough council estimates it has 3.0 square kilometres (750 acres) of parks, including, from Shepperton upstream, the Thames Path. Its sixteen main parks with recreational/sports facilities are supplemented by small greens and linear parks, such as those by the River Thames. The largest parks have woodland and flowering meadow. These support diverse and rare grasses, invertebrates and birds on a rich alluvial soil: Laleham Park and Sunbury Park.

The final great reduction of private parks was that of the early 20th century, a sale of Laleham manor demesne by the Earl of Lucan. The Jockey Club, as owner of Kempton Park Racecourse, is successor to the domain of the lords of the manor of Kempton – about 40% is a large nature reserve with its internal two large ponds abutting the Kempton Park Reservoirs Site of Special Scientific Interest, on Thames flood meadow.

The borough has five reservoirs, covering more than 15% of land, which apart from their main use of ensuring a stable and energy-efficient drinking water supply to London, are bird reserves and in the case of the Queen Mary Reservoir, a sailing training centre. A similar percentage of land is covered by other lakes, mostly former gravel pits no longer pumped out of water. The 10-kilometre (6.2 mi) River Ash, Surrey starts and ends in the borough.

Of recognised high importance to nature is Staines Moor, which alongside Sheepwalk Lake and wetlands, Shepperton are the sites of special scientific interest (SSSI).

== Transport ==
Staines is the borough's main station, being served by South Western Railway services to London Waterloo, Reading and Windsor & Eton Riverside.

== Other land use ==
A January 2005 enhanced base map study by the Office for National Statistics managed to classify 50.8 square kilometres (19.6 sq mi), 99% of land in Spelthorne. The findings of this study showed that the land use in Spelthorne was as follows:

| | Area |
|---|---|
| Greenspace | 20.954 km^{2} (8.090 sq mi) |
| Water | 11.165 km^{2} (4.311 sq mi) |
| Domestic gardens | 8.495 km^{2} (3.280 sq mi) |
| Road | 3.919 km^{2} (1.513 sq mi) |
| Other land uses | 2.491 km^{2} (0.962 sq mi) |
| Domestic buildings | 2.403 km^{2} (0.928 sq mi) |
| Non-domestic buildings | 1.045 km^{2} (0.403 sq mi) |
| Path | 0.209 km^{2} (0.081 sq mi) |
| Rail | 0.134 km^{2} (0.052 sq mi) |

Two Rivers Retail Park and Elmsleigh Shopping Centre in Staines-upon-Thames. In 2016 there were:

- 5,365 businesses (including retailers) in Spelthorne.
- a 10 screen cinema with Dolby Digital Surround Sound.
- 12 miles of river frontage for picturesque walks.
- 65% green belt land or water – a green and blue buffer offsetting local major economic contributors Heathrow Airport and the UK motorway network

== Sport and leisure ==
The district has two publicly sponsored leisure centres and two private clubs with pools, and two without pools:

- Sunbury and Staines Leisure Centres
- the Thames Club Staines
- Nuffield Health Sunbury
- Pure Gym Staines
- The Gym Sunbury

It has two golf courses.

School-taught English sports: cricket and football are played at many pitches; the third, rugby union is played at the London Irish Hazelwood Centre sharing pitches with London Irish Amateur Rugby Football Club in Sunbury. Staines Rugby Club play next to the Feltham-Hanworth-Sunbury tripoint in Lower Feltham.

Spelthorne has two football clubs – semi- or non-professional – as the top men's sides compete in the lower leagues:

| Club | Ground |
|---|---|
| Ashford Town (Middlesex) F.C | The Robert Parker Stadium, Short Lane, Stanwell |
| Spelthorne Sports F.C. | Spelthorne Sports Club, Staines Road West, Ashford |

Spelthorne hosts one of the county's major archery clubs (Spelthorne Archers) and five lawn bowls clubs.

Fishing is open to all, subject to rod licensing, from the Thames Path National Trail and adjoining islands in Laleham and Staines as well as at lakes in Shepperton and Ashford. One rowing club is in the borough, at Laleham, with others nearby including Staines Boat Club across Staines Bridge from the town centre which organises a regatta to Penton Hook in July for racing shells. Sunbury Skiff and Punting Club is the newest of all six which are quite clustered on the Thames, several of which incorporate dongola racing, dragon boat racing and canoeing. It organises an August regatta with fireworks.

In May the Staines 10k charity run takes place organised by two local running/'strolling' clubs and the council. One of the more than 720 nationwide 5,000-metre running competitions of the major organiser is around the rugby union club in its borders, which has a small nature reserve it owns to one end.

Other venues hosting annual events in a range of sports are Kempton Park Racecourse and Staines Lammas Park.

== Towns and villages ==
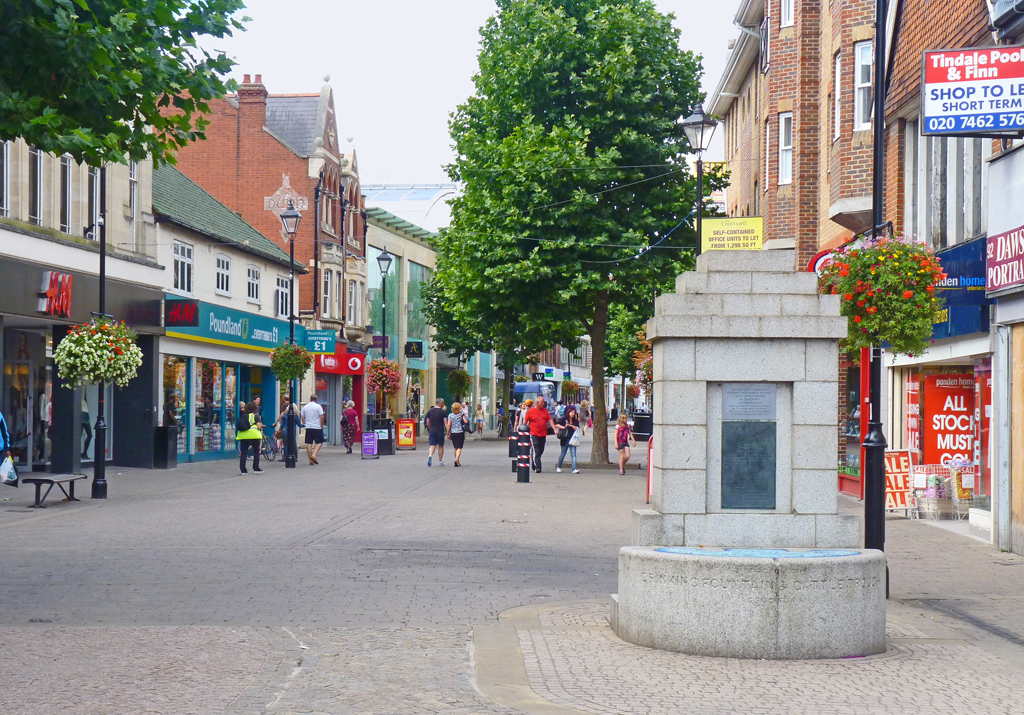
High Street in Staines-upon-Thames

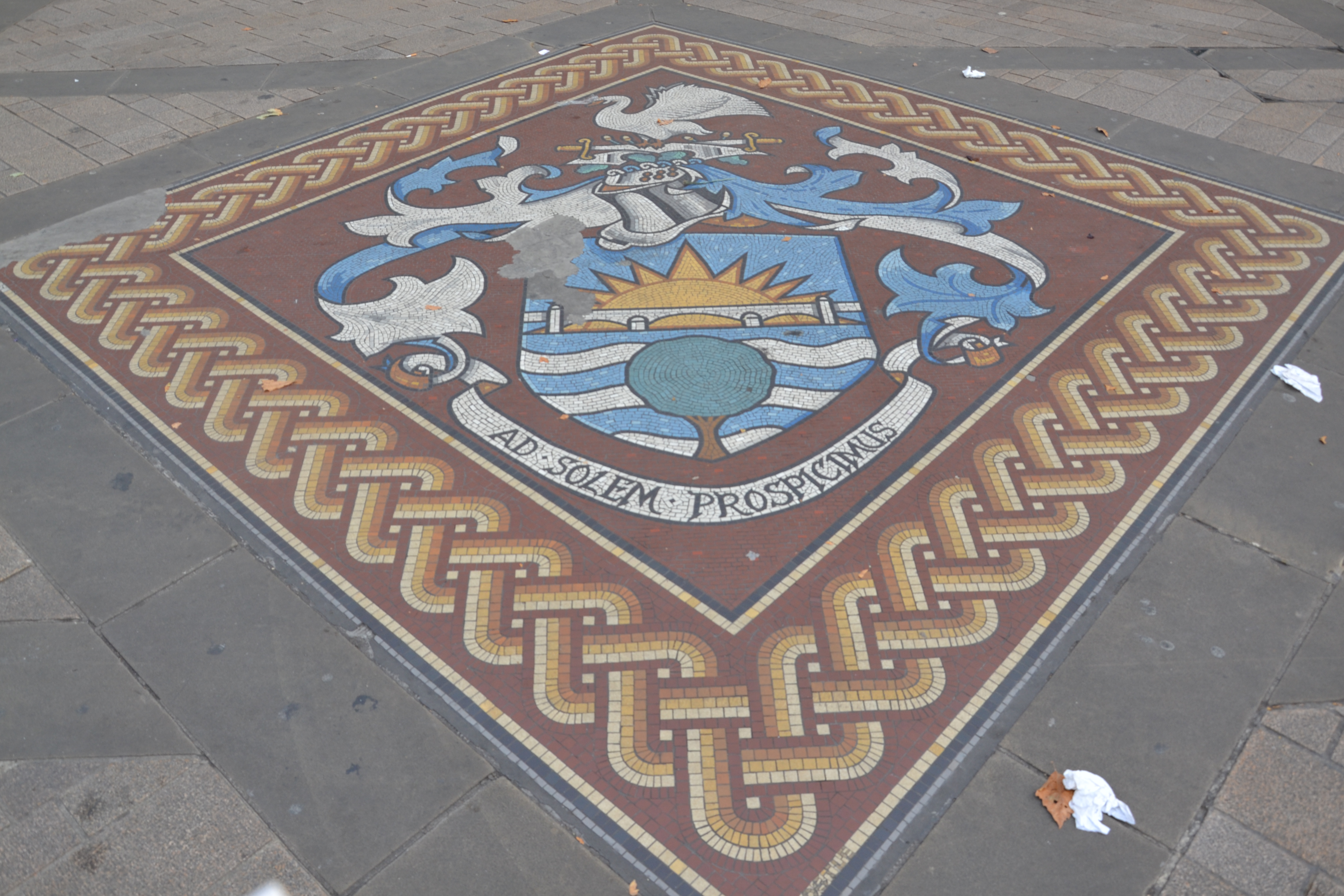
Spelthorne coat of arms mosaic on Staines High Street

The stated proportion of land that is absorbed by domestic dwellings tends to be housing with gardens forming suburbs to London and otherwise has mid rise urban town centres with exceptional offices (in Staines-upon-Thames) and apartments (in Sunbury-on-Thames) which are high rise, including a minority of the social housing.

The non-urban parts, inclusive of the embanked water retaining reservoirs, are today for the most part Spelthorne's parks and lakes. The bulk of the rest is mostly narrow buffering land being arable farming, horse-grazing meadows and sheep grazing on the reservoir embankments and fringes with Green Belt legal status. Shopping is available in each of the towns and in the village of Shepperton but not in the other small villages which are connected by road and bus to the nearby towns. Kempton Park Racecourse and Shepperton Studios are in Spelthorne. Staines is the largest town and has local government and judicial buildings. Each of the towns has libraries and schools.

In July 2017, Shepperton was named as the UK's most courteous town by the National Campaign for Courtesy.

=== List of towns and villages ===
- Staines-upon-Thames
- Sunbury on Thames
- Shepperton
- Ashford
- Laleham (Note: In Staines upon Thames post town. As with the first four places, these are ancient parishes, manors and were also in local services/improvements civil parishes from 1895 until 1974.)
- Stanwell
- Stanwell Moor (Note: Former hamlet of Stanwell. In Staines upon Thames post town. Its verges, grazing and hay meadow parts have mostly become part of Staines Moor from which they have been indivisible since the 1820s when both were inclosed (privatised) from an area of common land alongside the River Colne and later transferred to the local authority.)
- Upper Halliford (Note: Former hamlet of Sunbury-on-Thames. In Shepperton post town.)
- Charlton
- Littleton (Note: Covers a small area as covered most of the Queen Mary Reservoir. Of sporadic use: half-rural, half-suburban streets with trees and verges. The streets adjoin other housing across the Ash in Shepperton Green; within Shepperton post town and this is the home of Shepperton Studios.)

=== Subsumed hamlets or manors ===
- Kempton
- Astleham: see Littleton, above and Queen Mary Reservoir, above.

== Twinning ==
- Melun, France.
- Grand Port, Mauritius.

== See also ==
- Spelthorne (UK Parliament constituency)
