= River Ash, Surrey =

River in Surrey, England

Coordinates: 51.407°N 0.469°W

River Ash
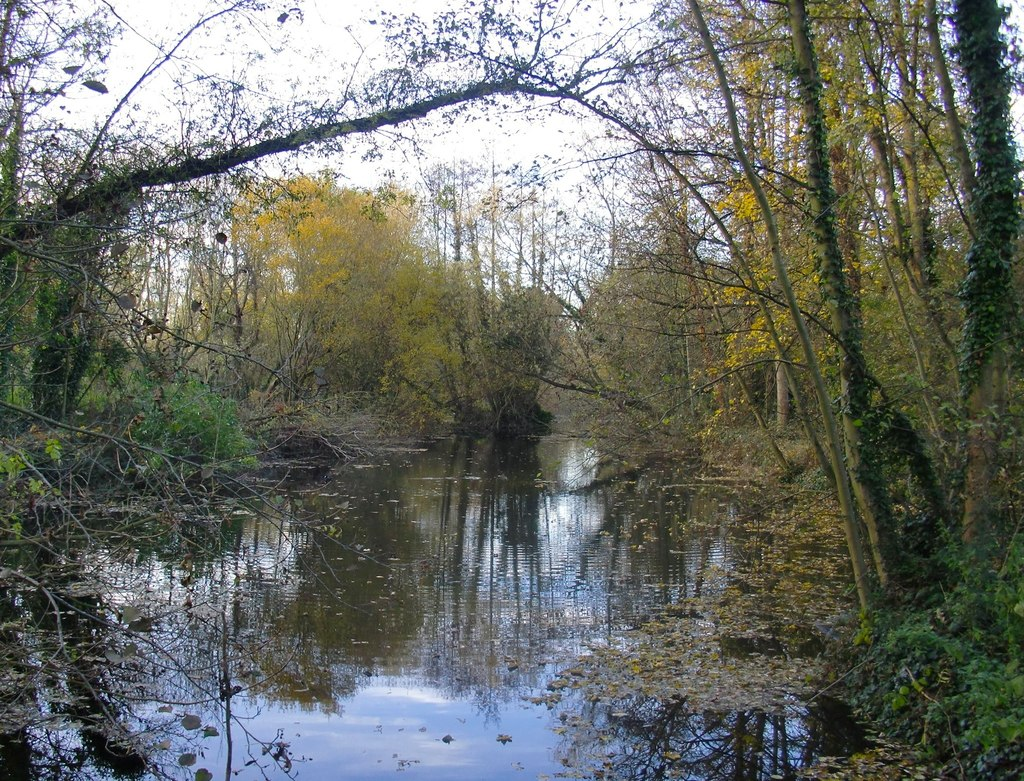
- Reach with wider banks, reeds and woodland close to Shepperton Studios

- The southernmost inner west-east line marks the end of the river, the rest is wholly in the same Borough shown.

Location
- Country/Nation: United Kingdom
- Region/Country: England
- County: Surrey
- City: Sunbury-on-Thames, Shepperton, Littleton, Laleham, Ashford, Staines-upon-Thames

Physical characteristics
- Source: Sluice against lower River Colne
  - location: Staines-upon-Thames, Spelthorne, England, United Kingdom
  - elevation: 14 m (46 ft)
- Mouth: River Thames
  - location: Sunbury-on-Thames and Shepperton, Spelthorne, England, United Kingdom
  - elevation: 8.6 m (28 ft)
- Length: 10 km (6.2 mi)
- Width
  - minimum: 2 feet (0.61 m)
  - average: 6 feet (1.8 m)
  - maximum: 20 feet (6.1 m)
- Depth
  - minimum: 0.5 feet (0.15 m)
  - average: 1.5 feet (0.46 m)
  - maximum: 5 feet (1.5 m)

Basin features
- Progression: Colne—Ash—Thames
- Artificial extra source: outflow of un-useable water from fresh waterworks

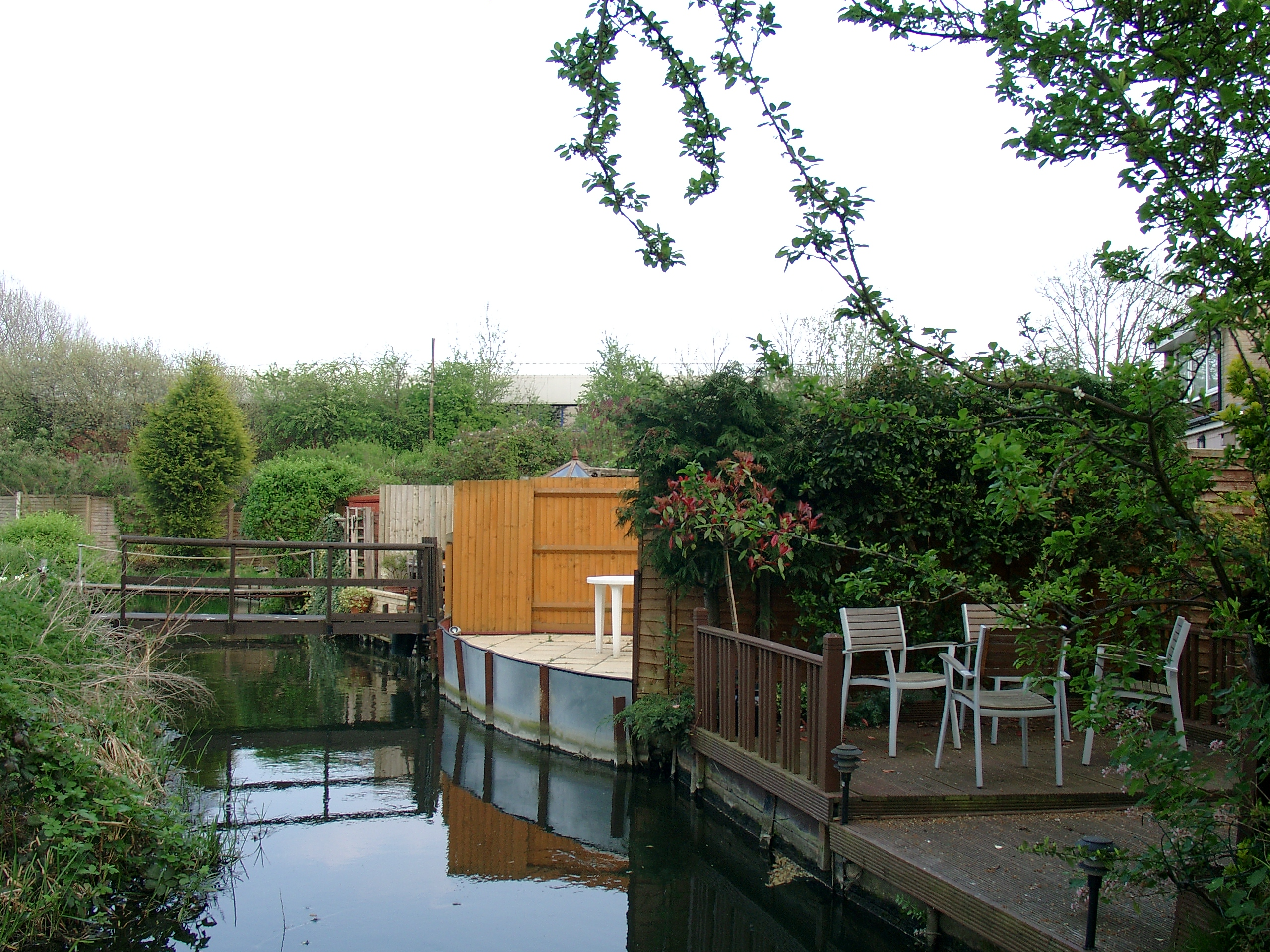
River Ash in suburban north-east Shepperton

The River Ash is a small, shallow river in Surrey, England. Its course of 10 kilometres (6.2 mi) is just outside Greater London. Work has been carried out to re-align, clear and build up a small, Littleton head of water and create two backwaters. One backwater dates to the medieval period; the other to the 1990s. It flows as one of the six distributaries of the River Colne from the south of Staines Moor immediately south of the Staines Bypass eastwards through the rest of the borough of Spelthorne before meeting the River Thames.

It is not navigable to craft and is rich in plant and insects, particularly reeds, diverse sedges (many of which commonly called bulrushes), pond-skaters, amphibians and lepidoptera (moths and butterflies). It enhances the Ash Link Nature Reserve, Studios Walk woodland biodiversity site and two parks. It is recognised as a key ecological feature within its borough.

== Course ==
The river is a distributary of the Colne. It forms the traditional boundary of Staines-upon-Thames, first with Stanwell then with Ashford. (Note: The traditional system was set aside for the takeover by civil (meaning non-ecclesiastical) administration in Victorian England. Somewhat due to civil parishes in England the medieval parishes are almost always identifiable settlements of the same name today.) It then turns southward and splits Littleton (specifically the Queen Mary Reservoir, then a thin nature reserve by Shepperton Studios) from Laleham. The Ash then resumes eastward. It is the northern limit of diminutive, near-square Shepperton Green — the western third of which was for centuries a southern outcrop (projection) of Littleton, and remains so in the Anglican church system. Eighteen-hole Sunbury Golf Course on high-landscaped former municipal waste landfill then opposes a little of Shepperton across the banks. Then a farm of Green Belt straddles the river partly in outer lands of Sunbury-on-Thames. The river joins the Thames, flowing gently into the Creek – a secondary weirstream of the Thames – facing a long residential island: Wheatley's Ait. It marks two streets' garden ends, many of which have built footbridges. The five urban centres in the borough are well over 500 m away, which has spared the Ash from pollution and supported its biodiversity. Three parks feature the river such as a long walk in Fordbridge Park, Ashford. Canoeists avoid the river when deep enough to canoe due to short barrages, extreme narrows and culverts.

== Flow ==
In terms of flow of the distributaries, it is mid-ranked:

- flow exceeds:
  - Sweeps Ditch, Staines (perhaps no longer a distributary of the Colne since building works in the 1970s)
  - The long but ornamental Duke of Northumberland's River
  - The Longford River. (Note: The Duke of Northumberland's River was not only used for its current garden lake feature use in Syon Park but also to top up the River Crane for the Shot Tower gunpowder mills, then in Hounslow Heath from the late 16th to late 18th centuries.)
- flow normally dwarves:
  - the short final main Colne channel
  - the Colne Brook
  - the River Wraysbury which just rejoins the Colne tens of metres from the Thames (so is more properly a later corollary) acting as a distributary.

== Soil divide and water characteristics ==
Alluvium on gravel (save for London Clay outcrops, such as Harrow on the Hill, Hampstead Heath and the Grim's Ditch (Harrow)) is the soil setting of the north bank, west of the City of London as far as the Chiltern Hills. As to topsoil the river marks a divide between permeable shallow gravelly topsoil for many miles to the north and almost impermeable alluvium to the south. A very thin, agriculturally prosperous alluvial belt by the River Thames 0.6 miles (0.97 km) to 3 miles (4.8 km) away was caused by deposition from seasonal floods. This prevents for the whole course the rivers joining despite their proximity. As the gravel former terraces of the Thames very gently slope from north to south no abrupt halts to the water table exist no springs arise and only modest interaction with the Thames Basin's water table. The sources are water from the Colne and run-off principally of a fresh water waterworks.

=== Water quality ===
Water quality is ordinarily clean given improvements in the effluent treatment works along the quite populous Colne valley – for a low-gradient river eutrophication and deposition is moderate to low. The river is recognised as a key ecological feature within its Borough.

The Environment Agency measures the water quality of the river systems in England. Each is given an overall ecological status, which may be one of five levels: high, good, moderate, poor and bad. There are several components that are used to determine this, including biological status, which looks at the quantity and varieties of invertebrates, angiosperms and fish. Chemical status, which compares the concentrations of various chemicals against known safe concentrations, is rated good or fail.

Water quality of the River Ash in 2019:

| Section | Ecological Status | Chemical Status | Overall Status | Length | Catchment | Channel |
|---|---|---|---|---|---|---|
| Surrey Ash | Moderate | Fail | Moderate | 11.127 km (6.914 mi) | 19.015 km^{2} (7.342 sq mi) | |

== History ==
Ashford gains its name from the river, forming the southern limit of all but its east half (ex-manor demesne and Common). Relevant maps date to medieval times, showing course changes, some clearly man-made. The earliest at close resolution recounts various channels by Shepperton Studios (Littleton Manor demesne), commissioned by the Lord of Shepperton Manor, two miles to the south. This refers to the monks of Westminster, who caused the local widening into heads of water as fish "pond"s.

Since 1910 the ex-Metropolitan Water Board's Staines Aqueduct resembles the western 2.8 miles (4.5 km) of the Ash. It takes water from the Thames much further west to works at Hanworth and Hampton. To cross this and meander, the river is in a culvert next to: Birch Green; Shortwood Allotments; and Queen Mary Reservoir.

The mid-course was shifted a little west to make way for the Queen Mary Reservoir in Littleton. A slight trace of the original course is near the reservoir's pumping station.

In the early 1960s, the outflow (source) from the Colne was moved back south. Further east; 100 metres is diverted to make way for the Staines Bypass (the A30). It then flows underground for 270 metres beneath the Crooked Billet roundabout.

=== 1947 and 2014 flooding ===
Short residential streets in north-eastern Staines upon Thames were flooded in February 2014. At least 80 homes reported internal, outhouse or grounds flooding to the Environment Agency. Causes were complicated by the interweaving of an aqueduct which overflowed and various sluices; one found to be inadequate, another not best-operated.

A precedent for the river was in 1947 when flooding was widespread in the Thames Valley. (Note: See also, for example winter 1947 floods of the River Mole/River Ember)

=== Flood risk alleviation ===
Upgrade of the fresh water treatment works at Ashford Common (1994–95) by Thames Water Utilities caused greater steady outflow east of the M3. This heightened flood risk to properties abutting in Shepperton. Public budget work then arose, the River Ash Flood Alleviation Scheme of the Environment Agency. Deep holding troughs exist before the works run-off discharge and in Sunbury Golf Course a relief channel exists, bridged twice, built in January to May 1995 for £450,000.

== Listed bridge ==
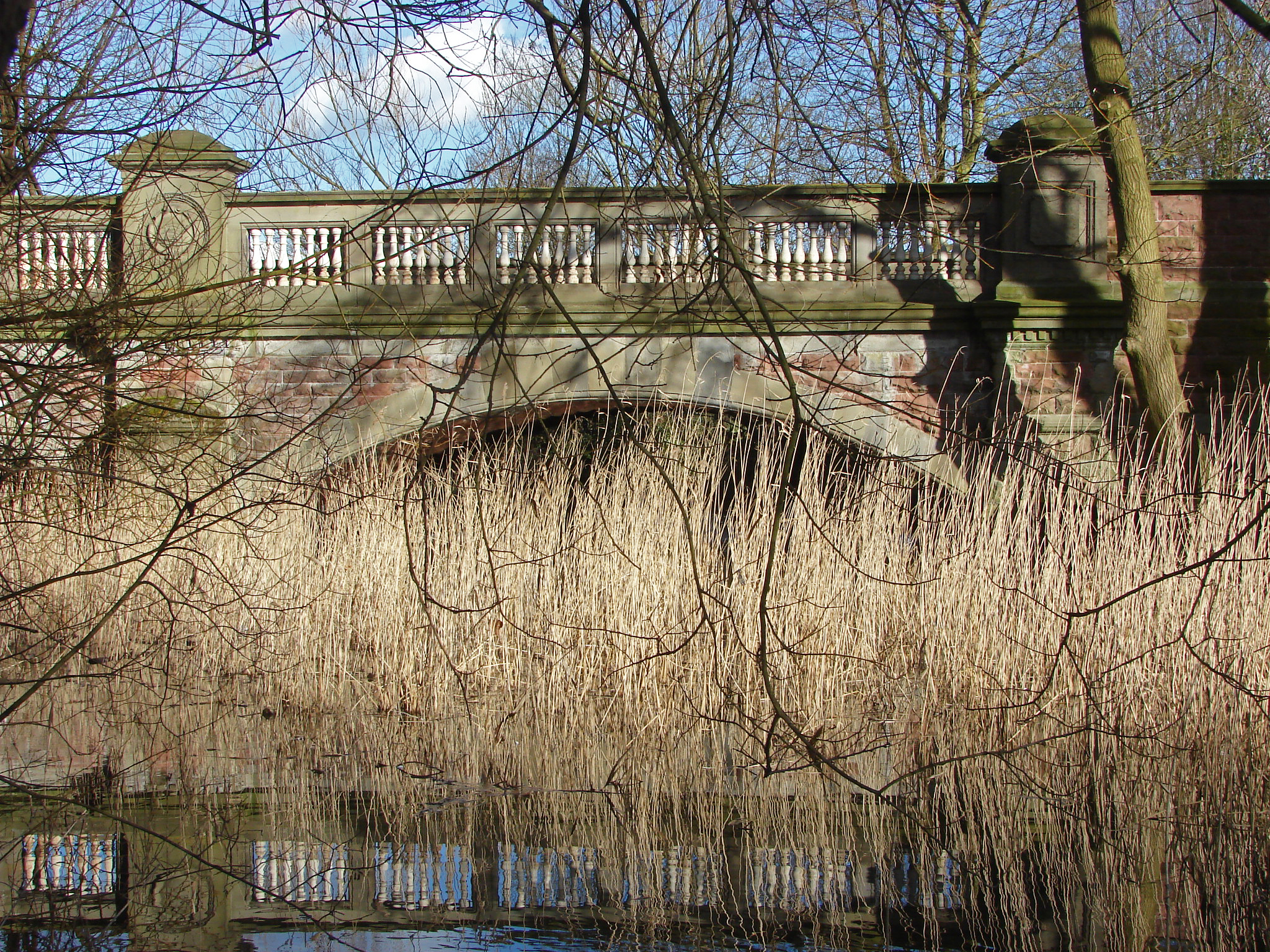

Squires Bridge is a long two-arch bridge which has substantial neat (ashlar) stone-dressings, such as seven balusters across six lightly recessed stone panels, each side, each arch. It has statutory protection and recognition in the initial starting category (Grade II). It was built in about 1870, partly by commission of the Wood family whose Manor House, standing at today's Shepperton Studios, had a costly fire in 1874. Its central newel (pilaster) as to its outer, upstream side has a coat of arms with three swords, not the family's which was that of a bull, instead that of Middlesex.

== Nature reserve and biodiversity woodland ==
Ash Link Local Nature Reserve, the first nature reserve in Spelthorne, was opened by the Mayor of Spelthorne in June 2012. It is managed by volunteers from Spelthorne Natural History Society and subgroup of its Friends in partnership with the Borough who own the land. It is in Shepperton, either side of the M3 as Splash Meadow in the south-east and Nutty Wood to the north-west.

The Reserve is linked by a large footbridge and has a variety of wildlife, mixed woodland, wildflower glades, ponds and the river. Conservation over the years has helped to increase the biodiversity of the area and as well as monitoring and recording the wealth of species; the volunteers continue to enhance the site for the benefit of the wildlife and enjoyment of the public.

In 2017 the Ash Link Local Nature Reserve was awarded a gold medal in the 'South and South East in Bloom' competition run by the Royal Horticultural Society; the next year the Friends received the 'Queen's Award for Voluntary Services.'

On the edge of Shepperton Studios (the Littleton "new" manor house estate), Studios Walk is a strip of Ash-side habitat. A surfaced path runs from west to east ends offering easy access and viewpoints over the river, unsurfaced paths also exist.

The woodland onsite is ecologically important thanks to numerous veteran oaks which promote a vast array of invertebrates. An oak tree can support 100 times the invertebrate abundance of sycamores. which, in turn, sustain bats, mice and squirrels. The rough bark and natural crevices that appear over time make ideal roosting. The natural progression of woodland into dead wood make the site an ideal habitat for stag beetles, iconic insects requiring large sections of dead wood to feed and for the development of larvae.

Kingfishers often are seen at these zones using the river as a foraging corridor. The marginal and in-channel habitat along with the sections of still water also offers ideal refuge for amphibians.

In 2016 a project was undertaken alongside the Environment Agency which formed part of the ColnCAN's "Weir today: gone tomorrow" programme. The works were the notching of a weir, installation of a new control structure and restoring a relic channel to serve as a by-pass channel to the main weir. The principal aim being to improve fish passage. About 600 metres was restored to provide favourable flow variations and enhanced aquatic and terrestrial habitat for a broad range of species.

== See also ==
- List of rivers in England
- Tributaries of the River Thames
- River morphology

== Notes and references ==
Notes

| Next confluence upstream | River Thames | Next confluence downstream |
| River Wey (south) | River Ash, Surrey | Longford River (north) |
