= Sunbury Lock =

Lock on the River Thames in Surrey, England

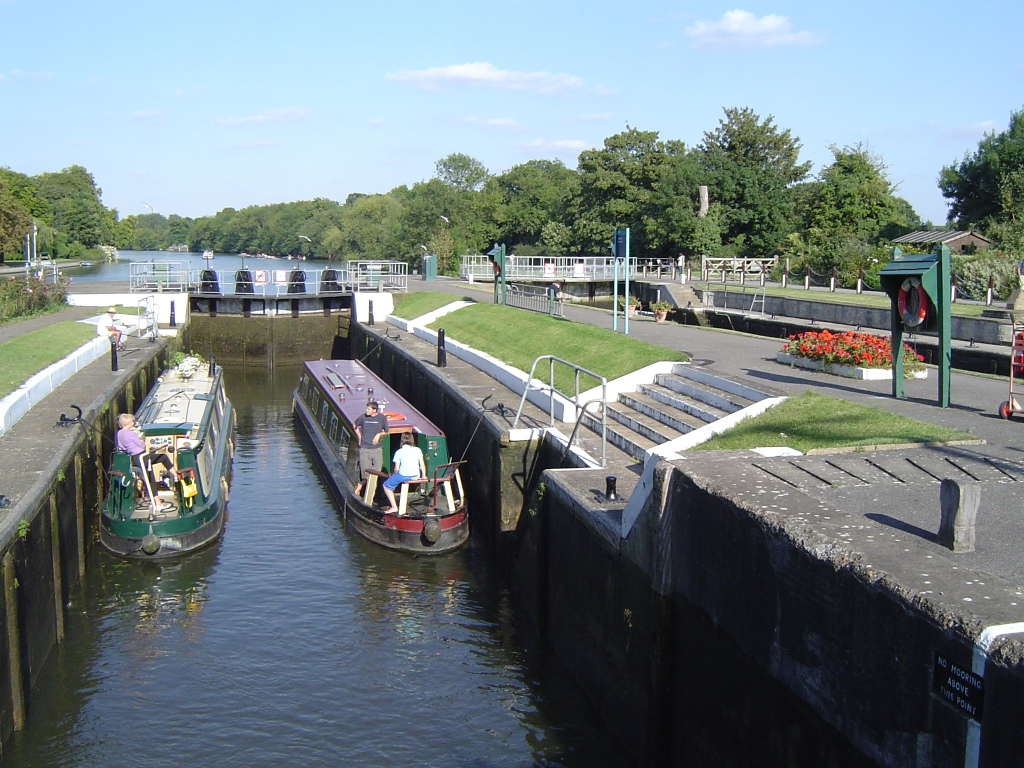
- Sunbury lock with boats in the older hand-operated lock. The new lock is on the right
- 51°24′18.5″N 0°24′22″W
- Waterway: River Thames
- County: Surrey
- Maintained by: Environment Agency
- Operation: Old Manual; New Hydraulic
- First built: 1812 (removed); 1856 (middle); 1927 (bankside)
- Length: Old 47.15 m (154 ft 8 in); New 62.78 m (206 ft 0 in)
- Width: Old 5.86 m (19 ft 3 in); New 7.41 m (24 ft 4 in)
- Fall: Both locks 1.87 m (6 ft 2 in)
- Above sea level: 27 feet (8 m)
- Distance to Teddington Lock: 8 miles
- Power is available out of hours

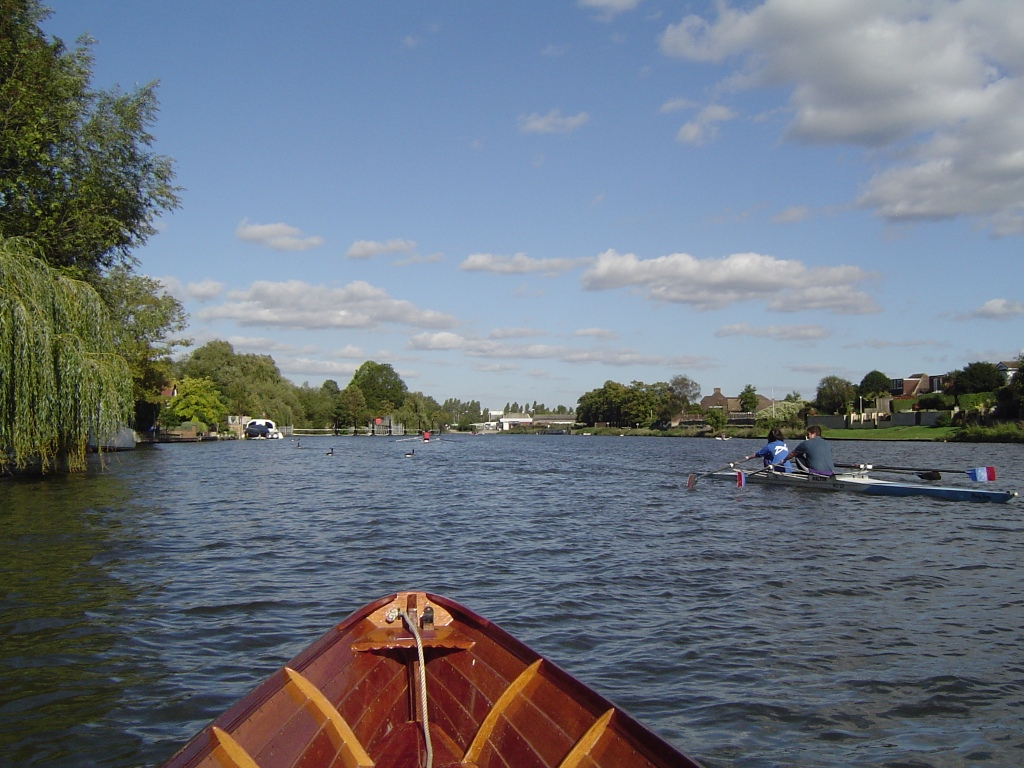
Looking towards Sunbury weir and lock from a skiff

Sunbury Lock is a lock complex of the River Thames in England near Walton-on-Thames in north-west Surrey, the third lowest of forty four on the non-tidal reaches. The complex adjoins the right, southern bank about 1/2 mile (0.80 km) downstream of the Weir Hotel.

The complex is two locks, old and new, and a narrow concrete divide, which are downstream of the original lock built in 1812. The older, hand-operated, was originally built in 1856, seldom used. The newer was opened in 1927 by Lord Desborough. Rollers and a slope adjoins for the portage (hauling) of small boats. The lock adjoins Sunbury Lock Ait.

The lock has three associated weirs, upstream. The main weir is between Sunbury Lock Ait and Wheatley's Ait (north); the latter has two other weirs, one is a small part-time weir used in high flows.

== History ==
The earliest major weir locally was built in 1789 specifically to divert water to create a deeper channel for navigation. Other such weirs locally were in place since medieval times because of many shoals and flats in the Sunbury, in the period of Old London Bridge (1209-1831) which caused much silting downstream the river locally had minor tidal effects. The first plan for a lock was in 1805 with an ambitious lock cut. A modified scheme in 1809 resulted in the first lock, later removed, built close to the footbridge to Sunbury Lock Ait, where its lock house of the same year survives. The associated long cut above the lock expanded a natural channel beside the island known as Church Island and the lock was opened in 1812. The lock had become dilapidated by 1852 and the arrival of water companies planning major water extraction from the section of the river below the lock added an incentive for rebuilding it. The lock was moved downstream and opened in 1856; a new lock house was built. In 1927 a second lock was added at Sunbury, which was opened by Lord Desborough, then president of the Thames Conservancy.

== Access to the lock ==
The lock is inaccessible by road and can be reached along the towpath from The Weir Hotel, Walton-on-Thames. The weir stream and Wheatley's Ait backwater, the Creek, is used for kayaking from the northern bank, between Shepperton and Sunbury-on-Thames.

== Reach above the lock ==
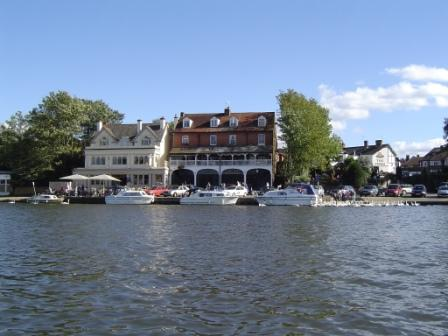
Walton riverside from the river

A 300 m cut upstream of Sunbury Lock Ait links to the Weir Hotel facing the Sunbury Weir which is followed by Wheatley's Ait hosting an Environment agency working area and riverside housing. More riverside housing, small parks and a marina feature on the Walton Mile and Cowey Sale reach below and above Walton Bridge, two pubs, and a marina. After Walton Bridge the river divides between the old course which meanders through Lower Halliford and Old Shepperton and the direct Desborough Cut alongside Desborough Island. Before Shepperton lock the waters rejoin where the Wey navigation the River Bourne and two mouths of the Wey join surrounding Hamhaugh Island. Immediately these, including the lock, the Shepperton to Weybridge Ferry.

Navigation transit markers are beside Desborough Cut to allow river users to check their speed.

The reach is home to six rowing clubs, a skiffing club, sailing and canoeing clubs. Walton and Weybridge Regatta, Walton Small Boats Head, Weybridge Silver Sculls, Weybridge Ladies Regatta and Walton Skiff Regatta are annual events.

=== Thames Path ===
The Thames Path continues along the Surrey bank until just before Shepperton Lock where the ferry goes across to the other side. To avoid the ferry calls for a long detour over Walton Bridge and via Shepperton.

=== Sports clubs on the reach ===
- Elmbridge Canoe Club
- Walton Rowing Club
- Weybridge Rowing Club
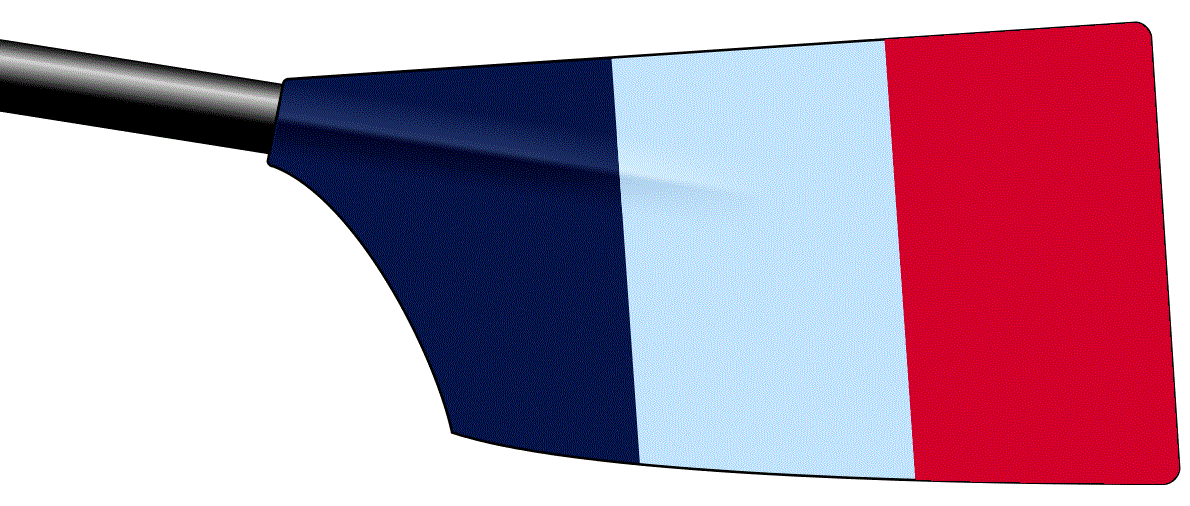
- Weybridge Ladies Rowing Club
- Weyfarers (recreational and pilot gig) Rowing Club
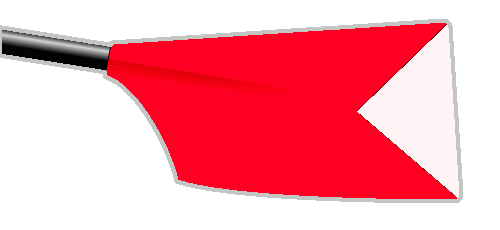
- St George's College Boat Club
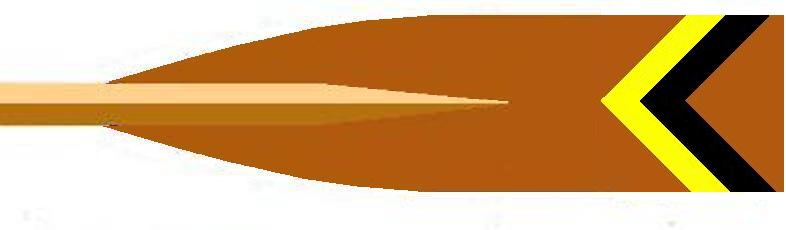
- Thames Valley Skiff Club
- Desborough Sailing Club

== Kayaking ==
Sunbury Weir has the highest volume and fastest freestyle kayaking playspot on the River Thames. It is wide, surging and unfriendly to new or inexperienced paddlers. The eddyline is also very unstable and requires considerable effort to cross.

=== Access ===
Public car park on Fordbridge Road above on the left bank. From here across an informal football pitch with playground is a backwater, the Creek, which joins below the main weir.

=== Gates and weir pool level ===
The weir's gates are variously opened or closed as with the storm weir along the Creek.

Sunbury provides its optimal water at a certain pool level — dependent on how many gates are open at the downstream weir (at Molesey), kayaking websites provide details.

=== Water levels ===
- Sunbury Weir will need to be on at least 1 1/2 gates for usable features, pool level depending.
- Hurley Weir needs to be on at least 3 gates for sufficient water.

== Literature and the Media ==
The lock is mentioned in Jerome K. Jerome's book Three Men in a Boat

"The river is sweetly pretty there just before you come to the gates, and the backwater is charming: but don't attempt to row up it"

== See also ==
- Locks on the River Thames
- Rowing on the River Thames
- Kayaking and Canoeing on the River Thames
- Sailing on the River Thames

Next lock upstream	River Thames	Next lock downstream
Shepperton Lock; 4.75 km (2.95 mi)	Sunbury Lock; Grid reference: TQ109685	Molesey Lock; 4.79 km (2.98 mi)
