= Wheatley's Ait =

Island in the River Thames, England

Coordinates: 51°23′57″N 00°24′55″W

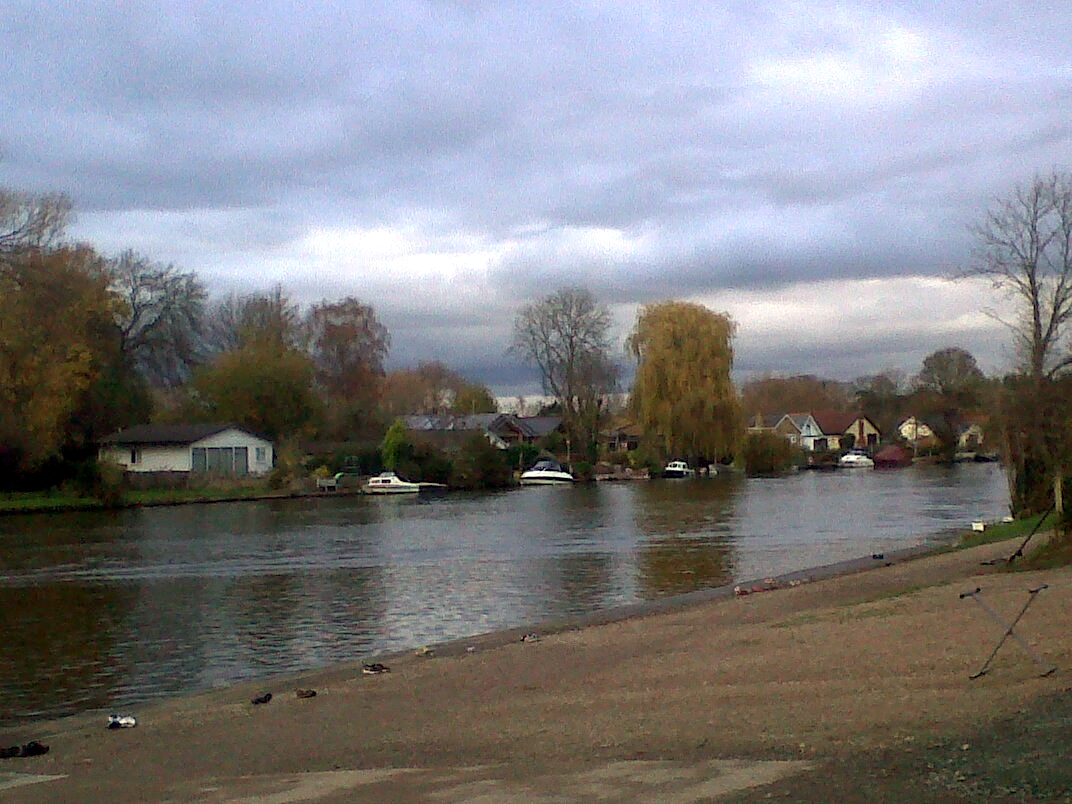
Part of the southern end of Wheatley's Ait

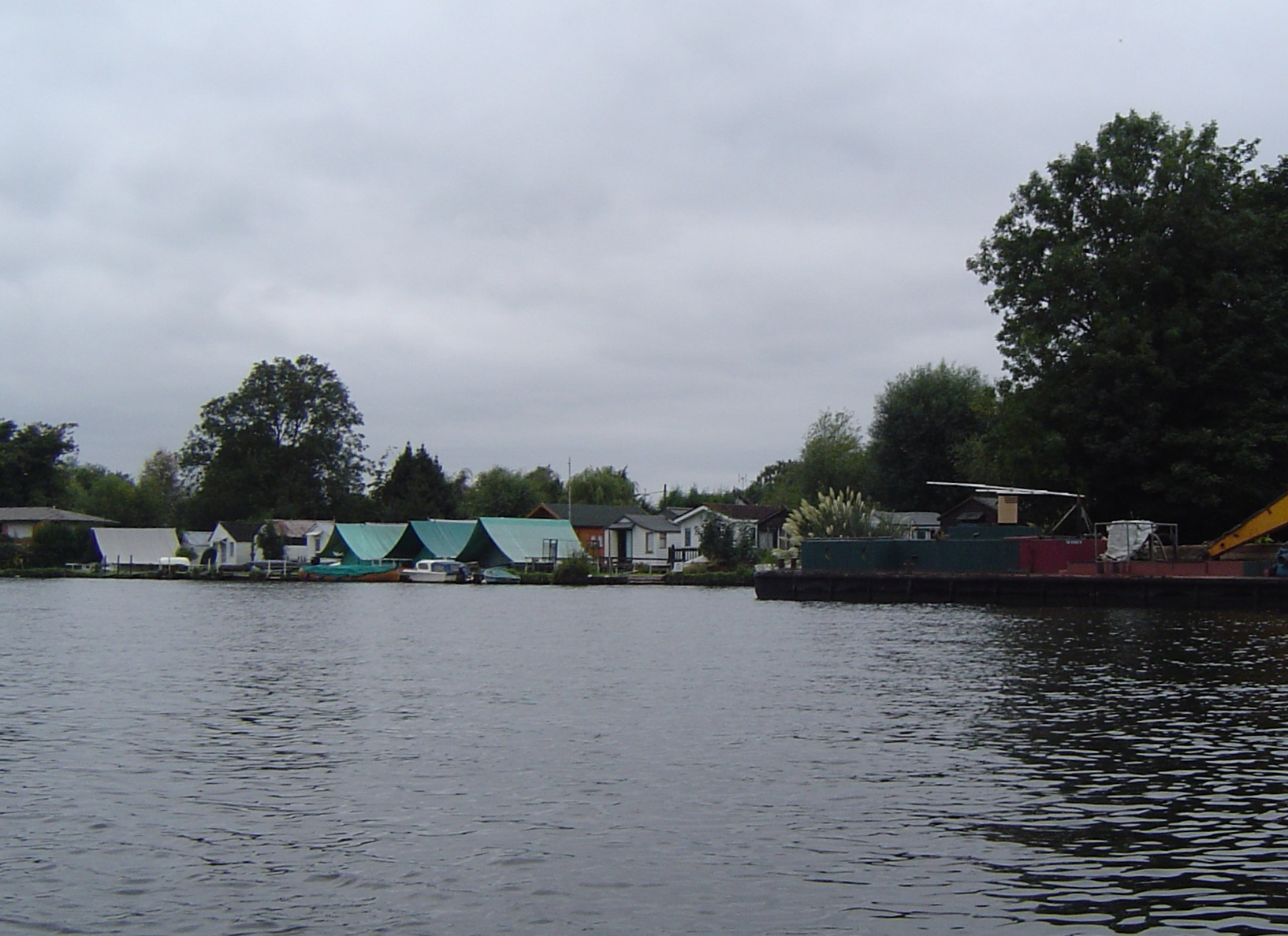
North of the downstream end of Wheatley's Ait

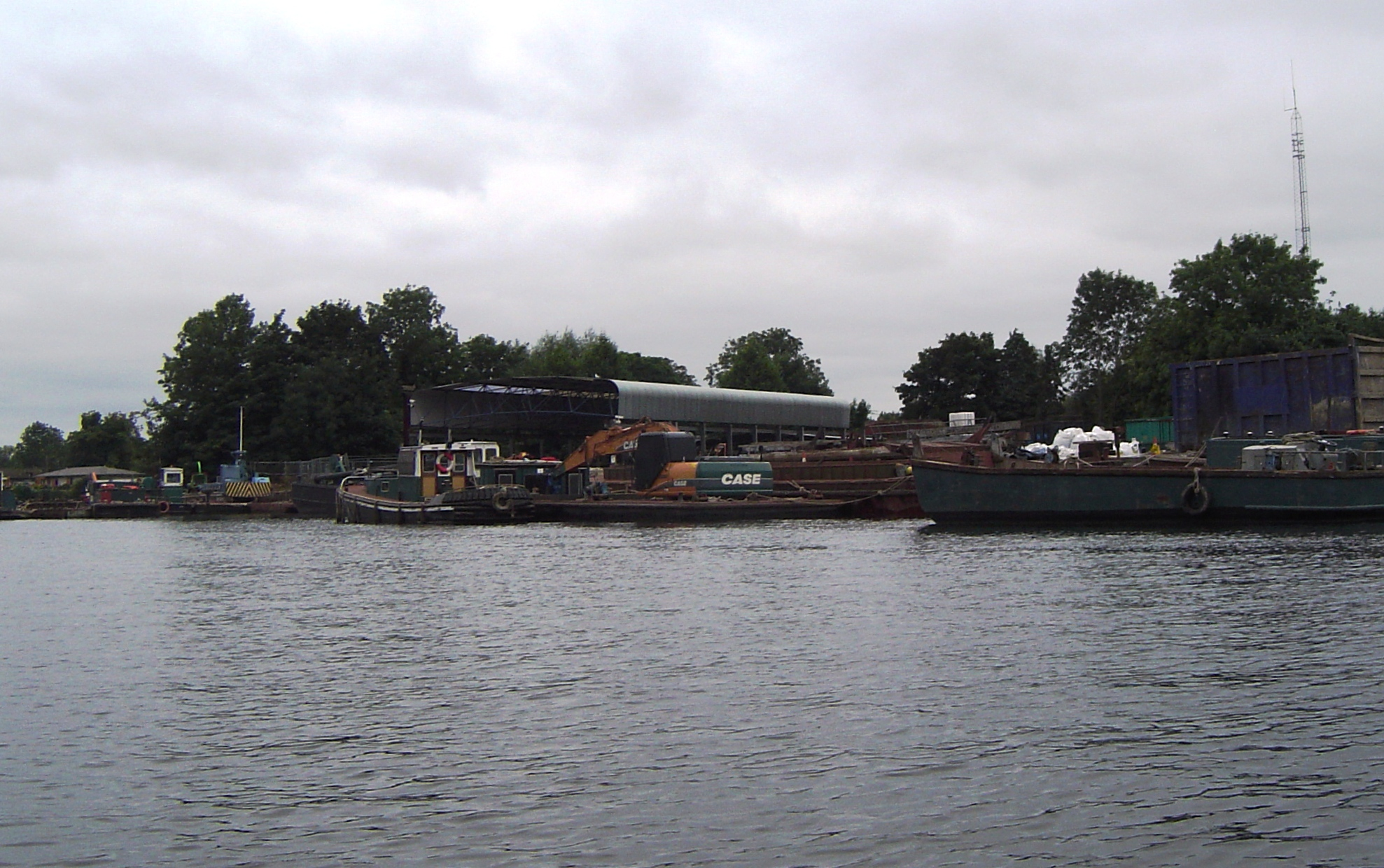
Middle of the downstream end of Wheatley's Ait above Sunbury Weir

Wheatley's Ait or Wheatley Eyot is an ait (island) in the River Thames of approximately 8 hectares (20 acres) on the reach above Sunbury Lock, close to the northern side and in the post town Sunbury-on-Thames however in the Borough of Elmbridge in Surrey, England.

== Detailed description ==
Its long downstream part, separated by a narrow additional storm weir from the long upstream part, contains a few residential properties, some midsection boatyards, dredging facilities and moorings for the Environment Agency and is for its bulk accessed by a road and footbridge to the northern bank; its southern tip is accessed by footbridge from the southern, upstream part. This northern part links to Sunbury Lock Ait by a private footbridge across Sunbury Weir which is closed to the public. The upstream part consists only of houses and chalets in riverside plots of land and is accessed by footbridge from the residential road, The Creek, on the northern bank. A controlled third weir, Tumbling Bay, touching the south of Wheatley's Ait marks the start of a quite shallow creek used for kayaking and fishing. Wheatley's Ait ranges from 450m to 1.3 km from the parish church of Sunbury-on-Thames.

Scotland Eyot is a former name. Thomas Vincent owned the land and Watersplash Farm in the 19th century prior to selling it, a Shepperton landowner related to Edgar Vincent, 1st Viscount D'Abernon., having acquired it from Thomas Carr.

== Demography ==
In the 2001 census it was included in an output area the most part of which was in Walton on Thames but which contained 146 properties of which 31 were on the island and a further 12 were unoccupied holiday chalets or houses on the island; 16.8% of the population (291) were aged over 65, eight households had no car or van, 50.0% had one car or van. Only 14.5% of the 249 adults (of a population of 291) were "grade D or E" (semi-skilled and unskilled manual workers, on state benefit, unemployed, lowest grade workers) as defined by the 2001 census. 91.8% of the population stated they were ethnically "white British". 136 of the 172 workers worked full-time. 10.8% of the population lived in an apartment with a lowest floor level above the ground floor and not on the island. 13.0% of property was rented, three units (16% of this) as social housing. Three people worked in agriculture, hunting or forestry, just over double the average for the borough.

== Postcodes ==
- TW16 6BU
- TW16 6DA

== See also ==
- Islands in the River Thames

Next island upstream	River Thames	Next island downstream
Desborough Island	Wheatley's Ait	Sunbury Lock Ait
