= Wraysbury Skiff and Punting Club =

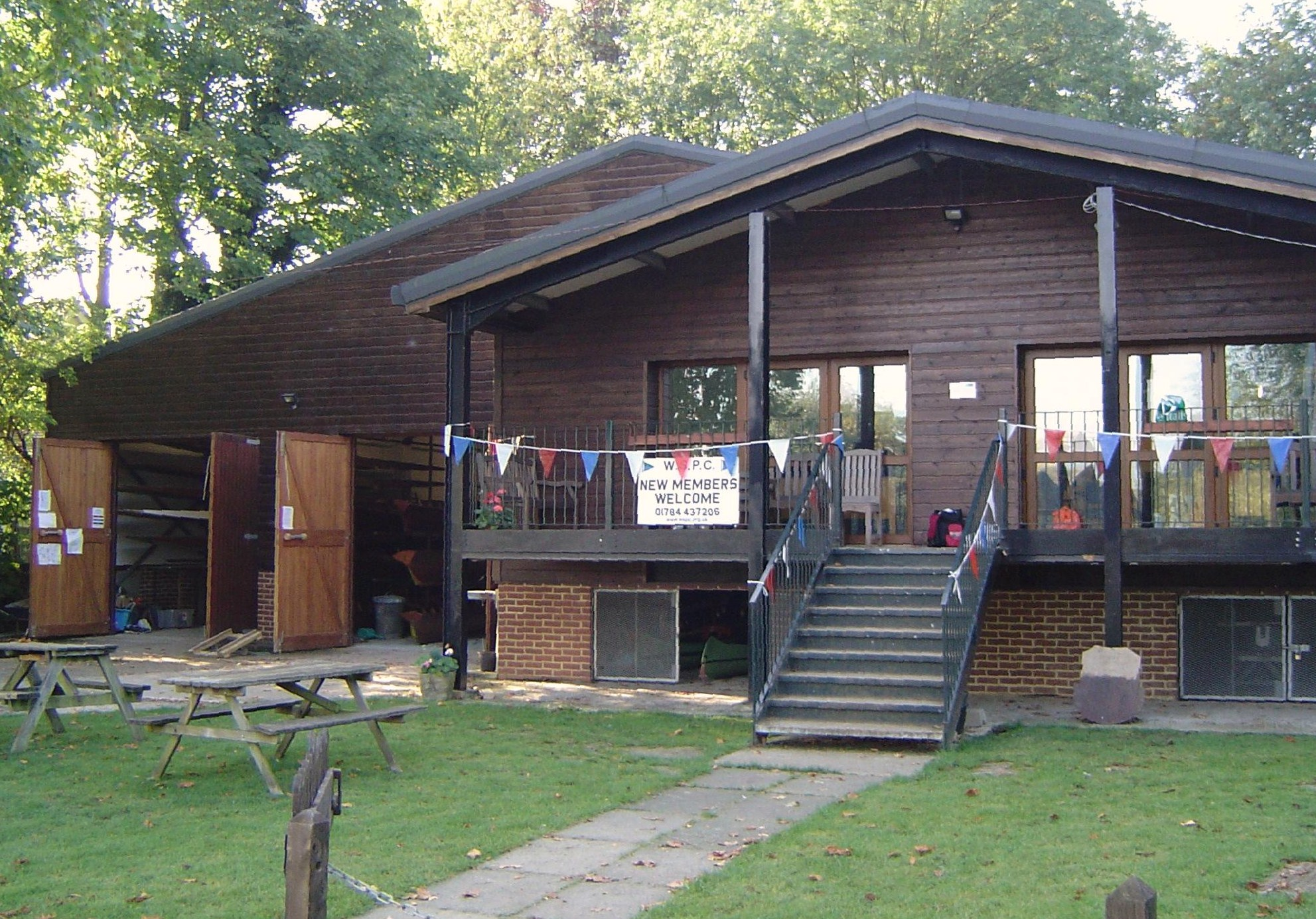

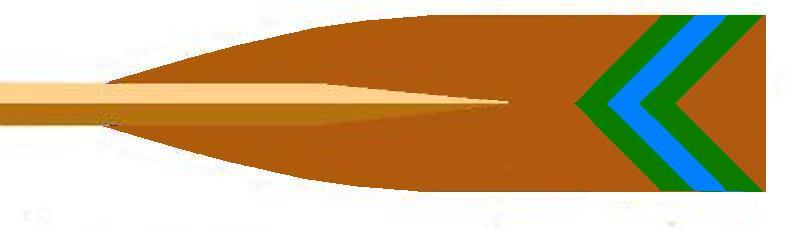
- Location: Runnymede, Egham
- Coordinates: 51°26′30.16″N 0°32′56.9″W
- Home water: Wraysbury/Runnymede Reach (above Bell Weir Lock), River Thames
- Founded: 1931
- Affiliations: SRA, TPC

Events
- Egham Regatta, Wraysbury and Old Windsor Regatta

Wraysbury Skiff and Punting Club (WSPC) is an English skiff and punting club founded in 1931 based on the River Thames at the start of the Surrey section of the right bank – between the rest of Runnymede (the meadow in the borough of the same name) and Bell Weir Lock (founded as Egham Lock).

== Boats, training and racing ==
The club hosts boats for two traditional water sports - Skiffing and Punting. Skiffs are traditional, stable wooden boats which are sculled with a pair of blades (oars). Punts are 2 ft and 1 ft (-beam) racing punts. Skiffs are raced at skiff regattas run under the rules of the Skiff Racing Association, and are used for leisure outings such as Thames meanders. Punting is carried out competitively (usually at the same regattas) under the rules of the Thames Punting Club.

The club provides support and coaching for all levels from beginner to advanced. WSPC organises a club regatta in September, Wraysbury and Old Windsor Regatta and the Wraysbury Long Distance event in May. WSPC also hosts Egham Regatta, the last rowing regatta on the River Thames before Henley Royal Regatta.

The club has also incorporated dragon boat racing and waka ama into its activities. The club colours are blue, green and white.

== History ==
The club was founded by a group of keen river sports enthusiasts from Wraysbury, but as they were unable to find suitable accommodation on the Wraysbury side of the river, the first clubhouse was at Haines Boatyard in Old Windsor.

The club later moved to accommodation next to Runnymede Pleasure Grounds, and has recently built a new club house there which was opened in October 2006.

== Dragon Boating and Waka Ama ==
The Wraysbury Dragon Boat Club (now Wraysbury Dragons and Waka Ama), an integral part of WSPC, regularly trains from these premises. Previously it had an affiliation with Bristol Empire Dragons and competed in the British Dragon Boat Racing Association (BDA) National league as Tao Dragons. Similarly it had an affiliation with the Exe-Calibre Dragon Boat Club. Wraysbury Dragons has fielded a number of international Dragon boat athletes in all age classes from Juniors through to "Grand Dragons" (50+). The club regularly represent at the BDA National League, Club Crew World and European Championships. In past and present, the club has sent numerous athletes to represent Great Britain at the World and European Dragon Boat Racing Championships. WSPC is a training base for the GB Grand Dragons and is also used by Junior teams. The youngest international thus far was 12 years old and the oldest over 60.

The club also offers Waka Ama, and outrigger canoe paddlers regularly train on these premises. These paddlers compete in the OC6 boat category which is a 6 paddler outrigger canoe, in long-distance races across Great Britain.
