= Sunbury Lock Ait =

Island in the River Thames

Coordinates: 51°24′13″N 00°24′35″W

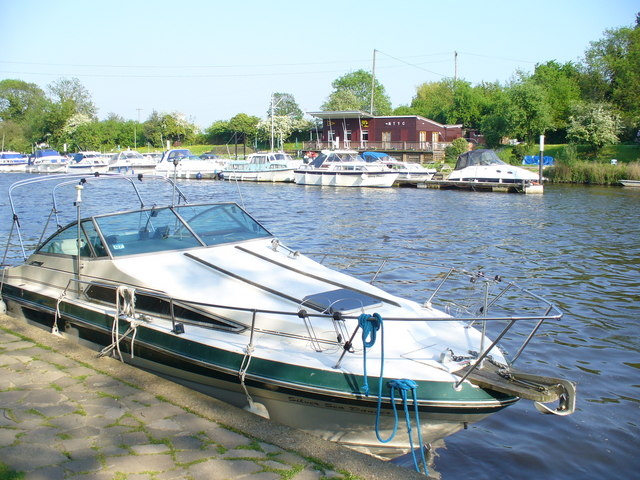
Sunbury Lock Ait: Middle Thames Yacht (motorboat) Club

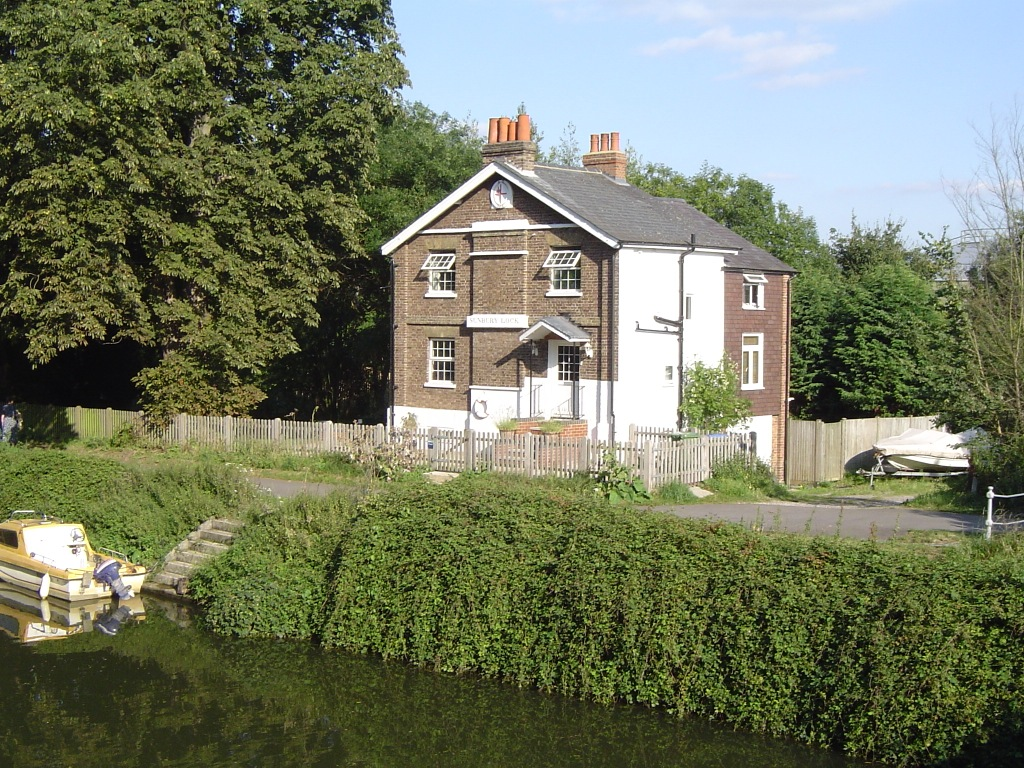
The old lock house on the connected bank in the northern, sports ground area part of Walton from the footbridge to Sunbury Lock Ait

Sunbury Lock Ait is the ait (island) in the River Thames in England adjacent to Sunbury Lock between Walton-on-Thames, and Sunbury-on-Thames, Surrey. It is unpopulated, but accessible by a footbridge over the lock cut from a wide section of the Thames Path towpath on the southern bank as well as walkways on the lock gates. Thirdly, a walkway links to Wheatley's Ait upstream, across the weir, but this is closed to the public. The quite long, thin island is inaccessible from Sunbury-on-Thames where it faces a long section of public riverbank, a few private conservation area Victorian terraces with moorings and two pubs also with moorings.

The lock island existed before the widening and deepening of the lock cut (navigation). It was for centuries known as "Sunbury Church Ait" until the City of London Corporation purchased it from about six proprietors to build the lock, which was completed in 1815, although a flash weir had been in existence since at least the 18th century. The footbridge and old lock house are where the lock originally sat, upstream of the present locks.

The Island has trees, ferns and brambles, the Middle Thames Yacht (motor boat) Club and a private boat mending yard.

== See also ==
- Islands in the River Thames

Next island upstream	River Thames	Next island downstream
Wheatley's Ait	Sunbury Lock Ait	Rivermead Island
