= Desborough Island =

Island in the River Thames, England

Coordinates: 51°23′05″N 00°26′40″W

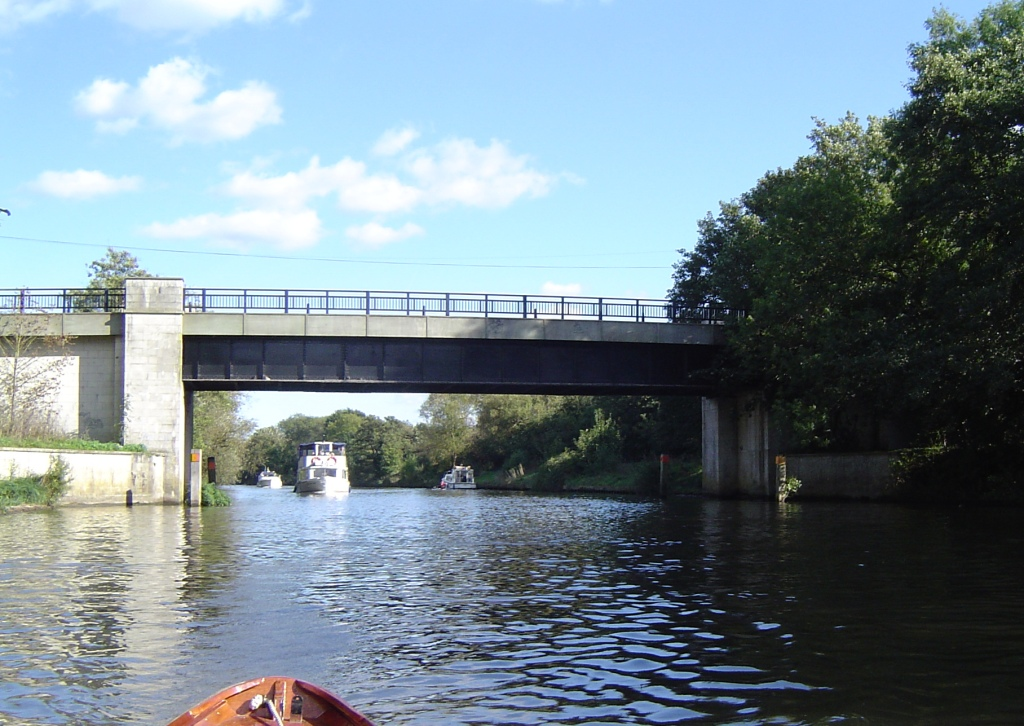
One of the two bridges across Desborough Cut to the Island

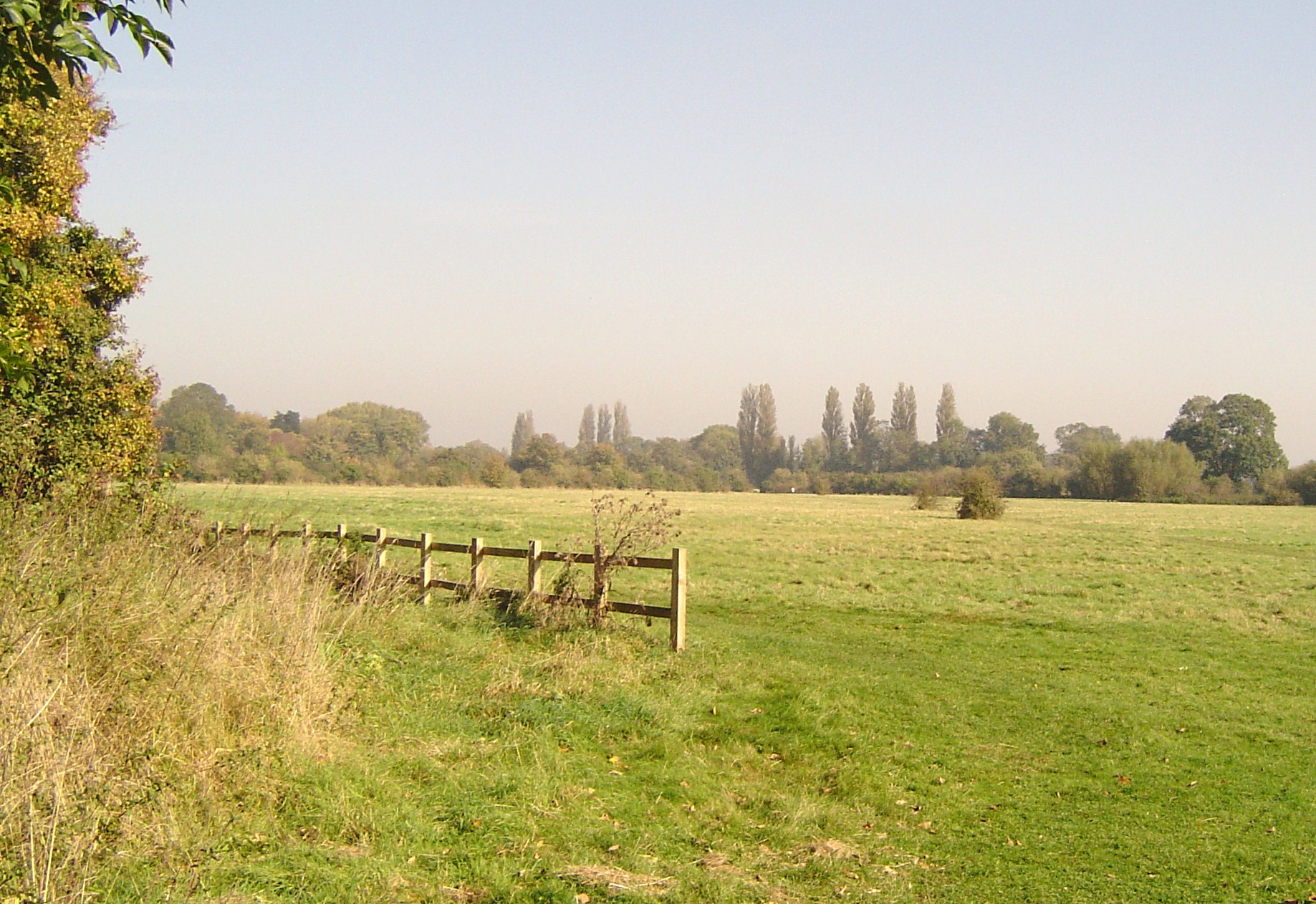
Open space on Desborough Island

Desborough Island is a 112-acre (0.45 km^{2}) manmade island in the River Thames on the reach above Sunbury Lock in Surrey, England. It was formed in the 1930s by the digging of a channel – the Desborough Cut – by the Thames Conservancy as a meander cutoff of narrow width on the right bank. The island and cut are named after Lord Desborough, a chairman of the Thames Conservancy.

== Construction ==
The 3/4–mile (1–km) Desborough Cut takes the Thames directly between the brief Weybridge bank to the upper (south) part of the Walton bank — creating Desborough Island between it and the river meanders which front much of Old Shepperton and Lower Halliford in Shepperton. The meanders remain navigable. They are of similar width to the cut. The cut alleviated flooding at Hamm Court and in Shepperton and halves the distance of travel from its start to its finish.

== Uses ==
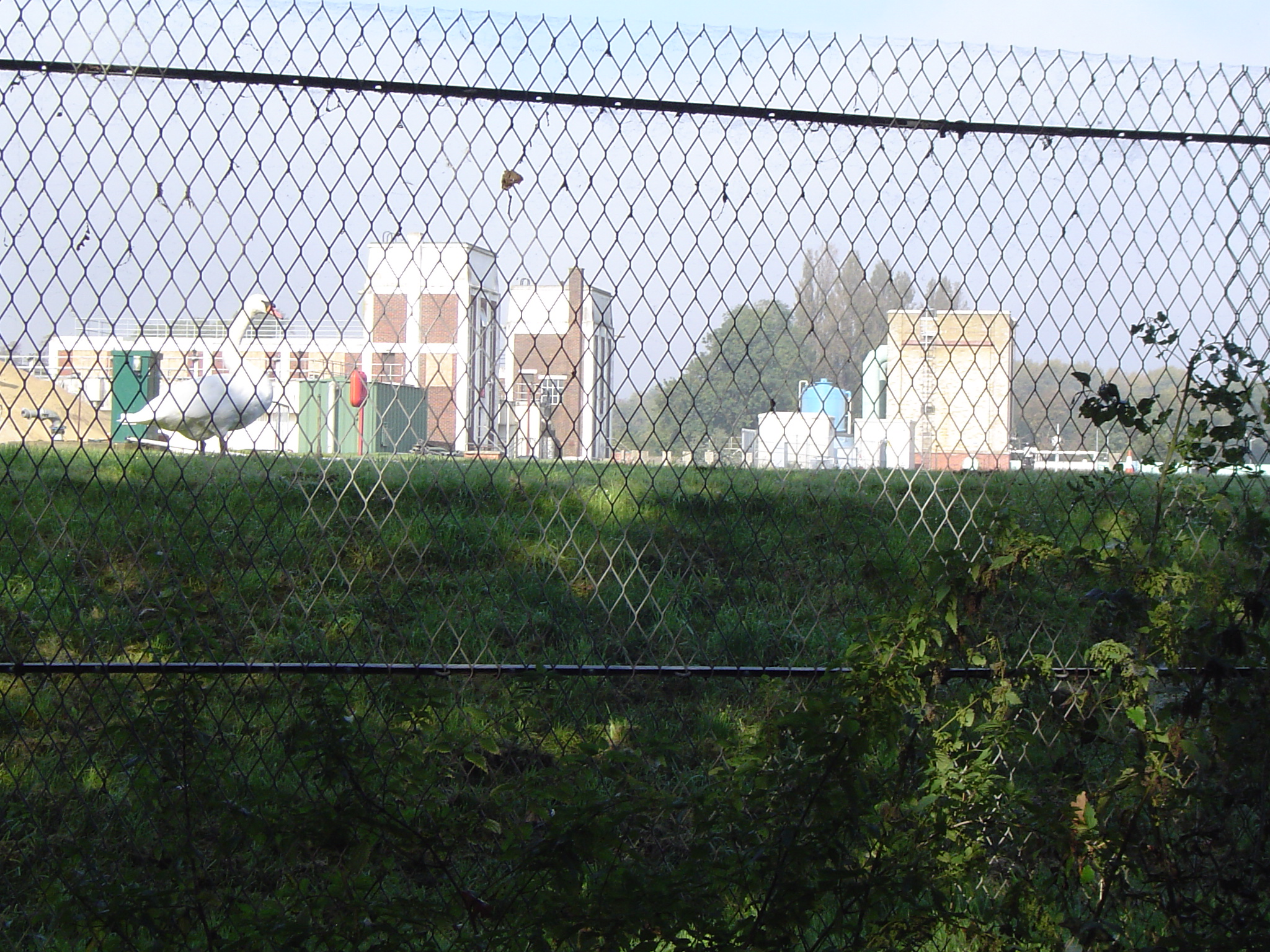
Waterworks on Desborough Island

The island is almost uninhabited: mainly open space, playing fields and water treatment facilities. The island has access over two bridges from Walton Lane; the upper bridge connects a green-buffer part of Weybridge, the other into a similar area of Walton-on-Thames. The parish boundaries are medieval. It covers 112 hectares (277 acres) of which 14 hectares (35 acres) is open space. It is a site of nature conservation importance and is looked after by Elmbridge’s commons management team. The island contains the Walton Water Treatment Works, owned by Affinity Water, and has some sporting facilities. Other parts of its land are owned by the EA, Surrey County and Elmbridge Borough councils. Pleasure boats operate from Walton, making a trip round the island.

The late 2000s decade saw paths re-laid, seating added and hedges relaid to improve plant diversity and provide animal habitats.

== In film, fiction and the media ==
The island and the surrounding river stood in for the banks of the Mississippi in the music video for "Karma Chameleon" by Culture Club in 1983.

== See also ==
- Islands in the River Thames

Next island upstream	River Thames	Next island downstream
D'Oyly Carte Island	Desborough Island	Wheatley's Ait
