= Egham Regatta =

Rowing regatta on the River Thames, England

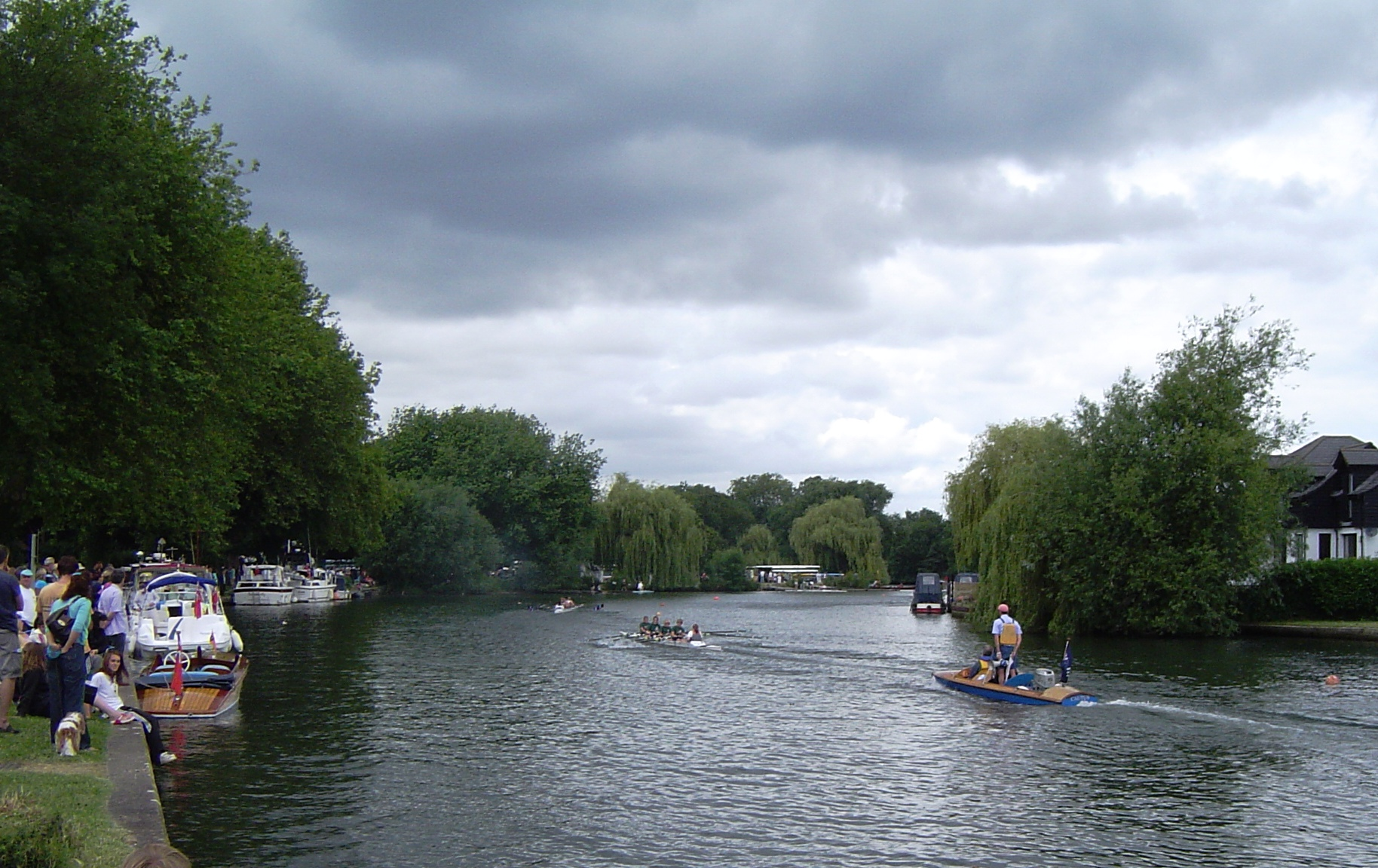
Egham Regatta - a convincing lead

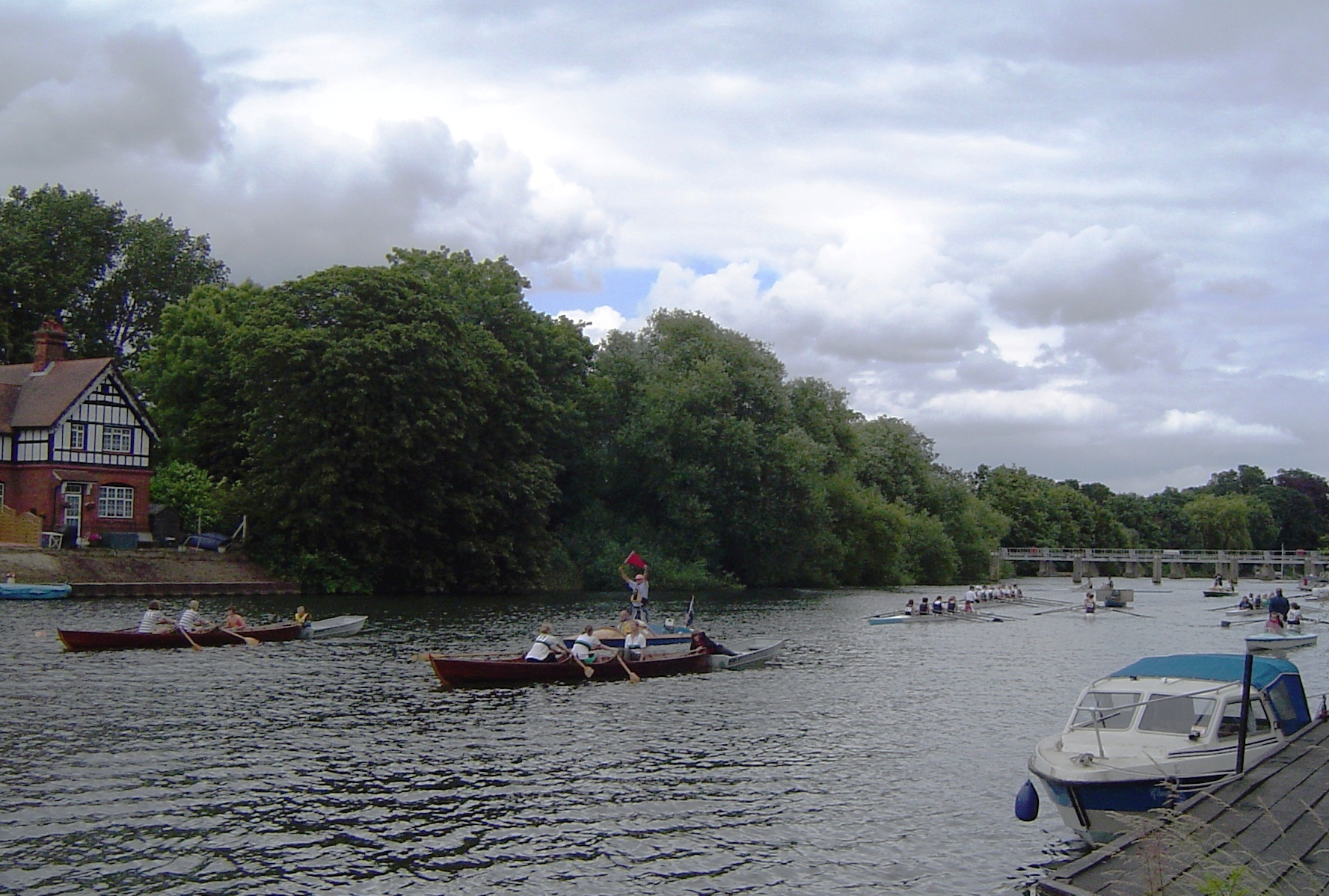
Egham Regatta - start of a skiff race

Egham Regatta is a rowing regatta on the River Thames in England which takes place at the end of June on the reach above Bell Weir Lock near Egham, Surrey. The regatta is run from Wraysbury Skiff and Punting Club and the Runnymede Pleasure Grounds on the outskirts of Egham.

The regatta was inaugurated in 1909 and was affiliated to the Skiff Racing Association in 1913. It was suspended during World War I and had a chequered existence until it re-commenced in 1955 as a purely rowing regatta. In 1978 skiffing and punting were reintroduced making it the only regatta in the country that still provides racing for rowing, skiffing and punting.

Egham Regatta has a short sprint course of about 650 metres upstream from a stake boat start. The regatta is the last on the River Thames before Henley Royal Regatta and provides sculling events for juniors in singles, doubles or coxed quads. It caters for competitors of all levels and ages from the relative newcomer upwards.

== See also ==
- Rowing on the River Thames
