= Great River Race =

Annual competition on the River Thames

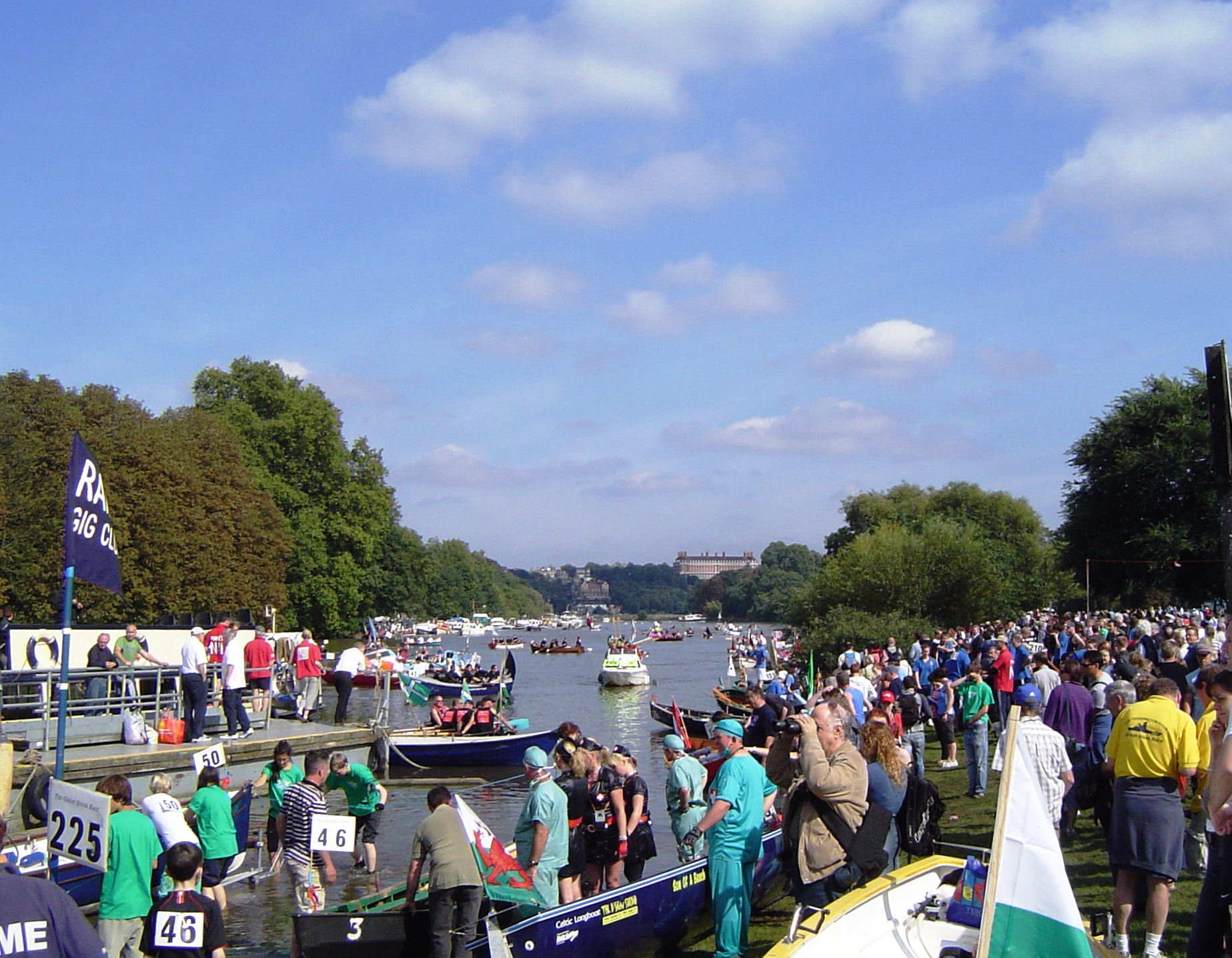
Preparing for the start at Ham (2008)

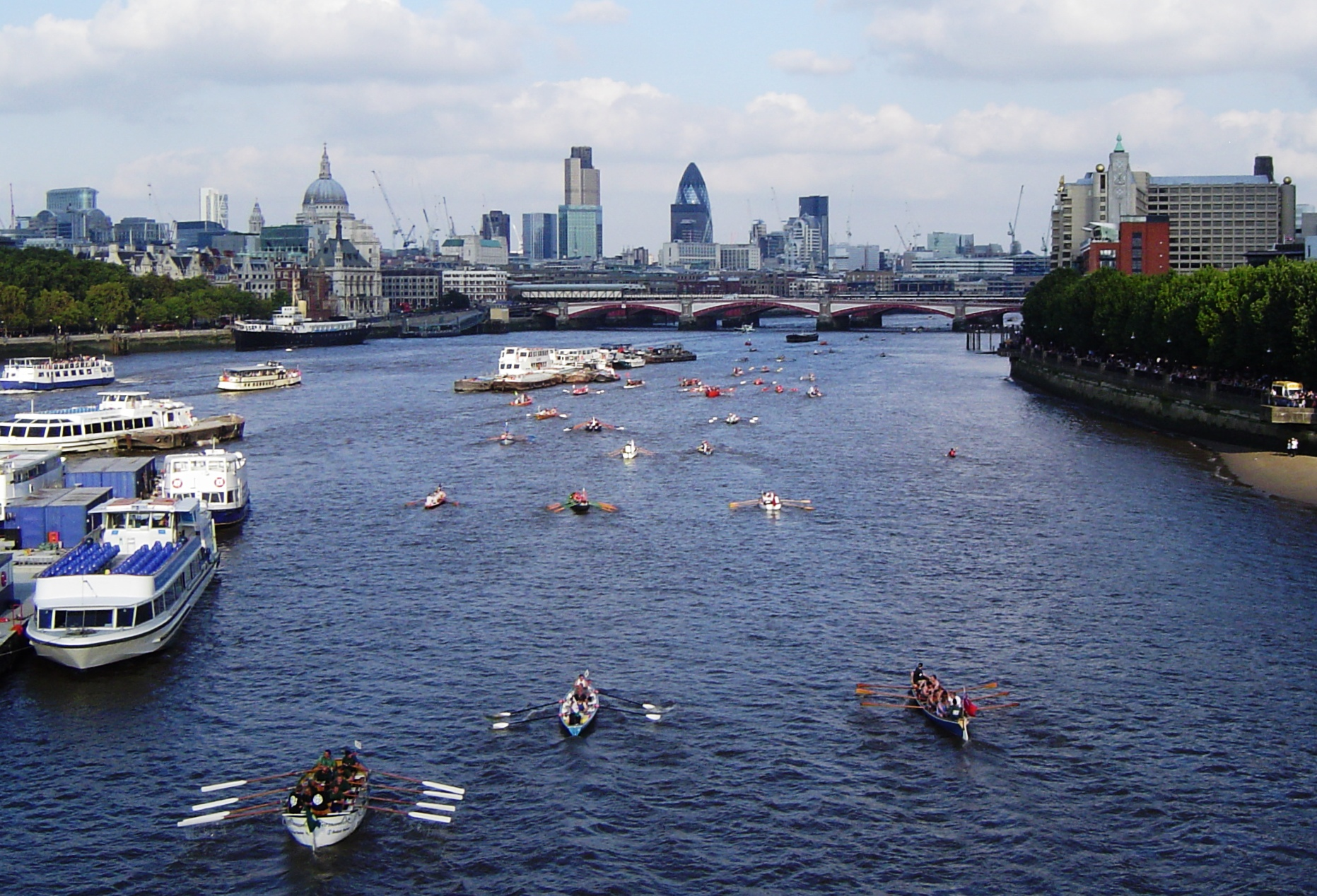
Through central London (2008)

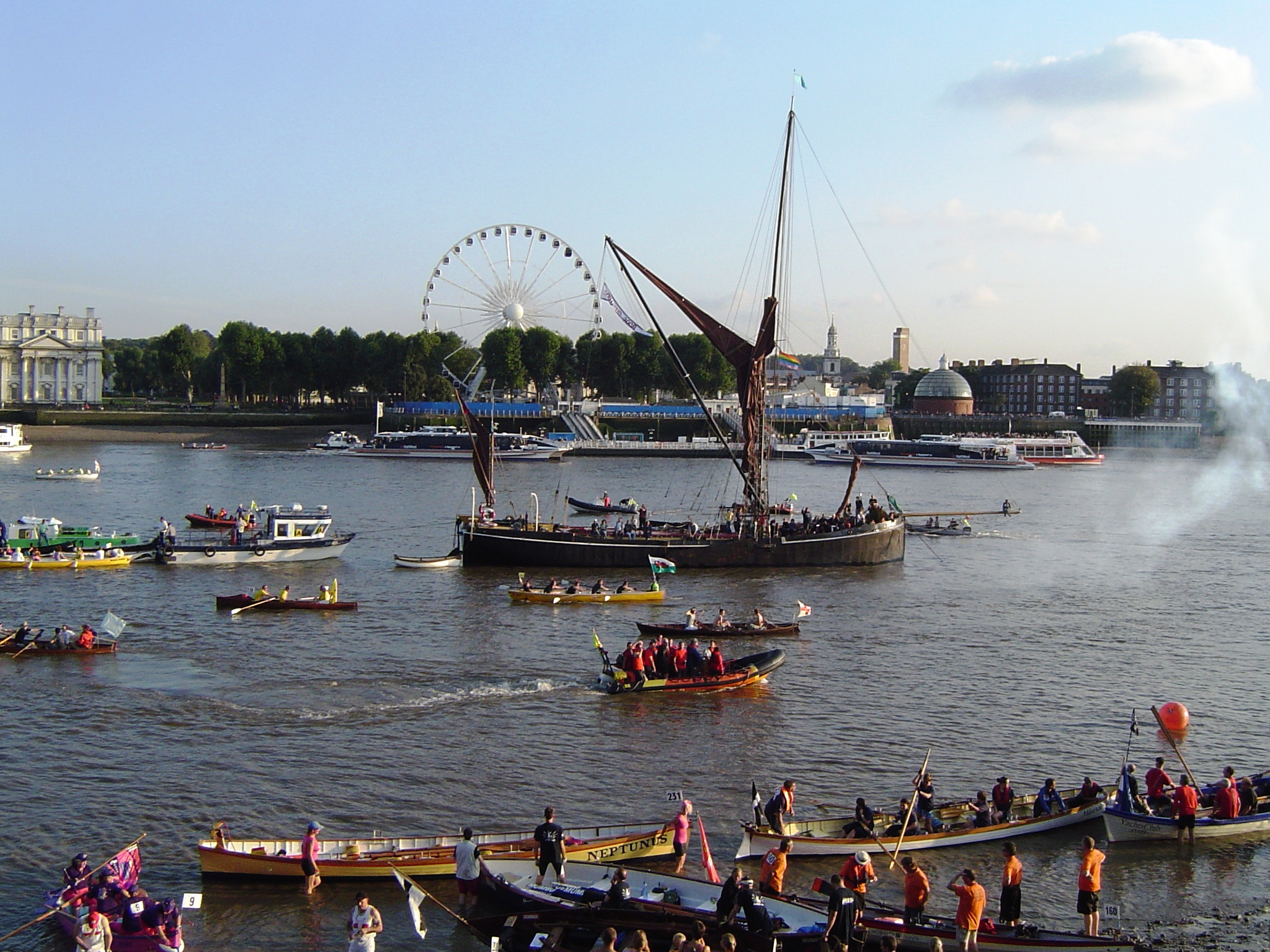
Finish at Greenwich (2008)

The Great River Race is an annual competition held on the River Thames for any traditional-style coxed boat propelled by oars or paddles.

The competition was started in 1988 and covers a 21-mile (34 km) course on the tidal Thames between Ham, London and Greenwich. It is usually held on a Saturday in September. Since 2009 the race has been run in the opposite direction, i.e. upstream with the tide from Greenwich to Ham. This appears to be the preferred arrangement for the organisers and the competitors alike.

The rules stipulate that boats must be moved by oars or paddles and have a cox and a passenger (although both cox and passenger may alternate with rowers during the race). Up to 300 boats take part including Gigs, Skiffs, Celtic Longboats, Cutters, Currachs, Dragon Boats, Whaleboats and an assortment of novelty craft. Boats are handicapped by class to provide an overall competition as well as competitions by class. As handicapping is on a slowest-away first basis, this makes for a lively race.

The race attracts serious racers as well as leisure rowers, making it a water-based equivalent of the London Marathon, and an interesting and colourful spectacle for the many who come to watch from the bridges and river banks. Every boat is required to carry a flag, and the prizes include one for fancy dress.

The race is dependent on the tide and was originally rowed downstream on the outgoing tide. In 2009, the Great River Race was for the first time rowed upstream on an incoming tide. Competitors rowed from Docklands Sailing Club at Millwall upstream to Ham Landing near Ham House.

The 2010 race took place on Saturday 25 September, was again run upstream and featured a challenge by a crew from ITN London News issued to their counterparts in BBC London News. The ITN crew took part in a C8 Canadian canoe while the BBC team rowed a Thames Watermen's Cutter.

On Saturday 15 September 2012, Gloriana (specially commissioned for the Thames Diamond Jubilee Pageant) was the leading boat of the oar-race on the final stretch from Richmond to the finishing point at Ham. 2012 Summer Olympics gold medallist Sophie Hosking and silver medallist Rob Williams were aboard the Gloriana. It was also rowed by youngsters supported by the Rowing Foundation, the Race's official charity. It passed under Richmond Bridge before mooring up opposite the finish, below Ham House, in time to greet the winner of the 25th edition of the race.
