= Desborough Cut =

Channel in Surrey, England

Coordinates: 51.3828°N 0.4439°W

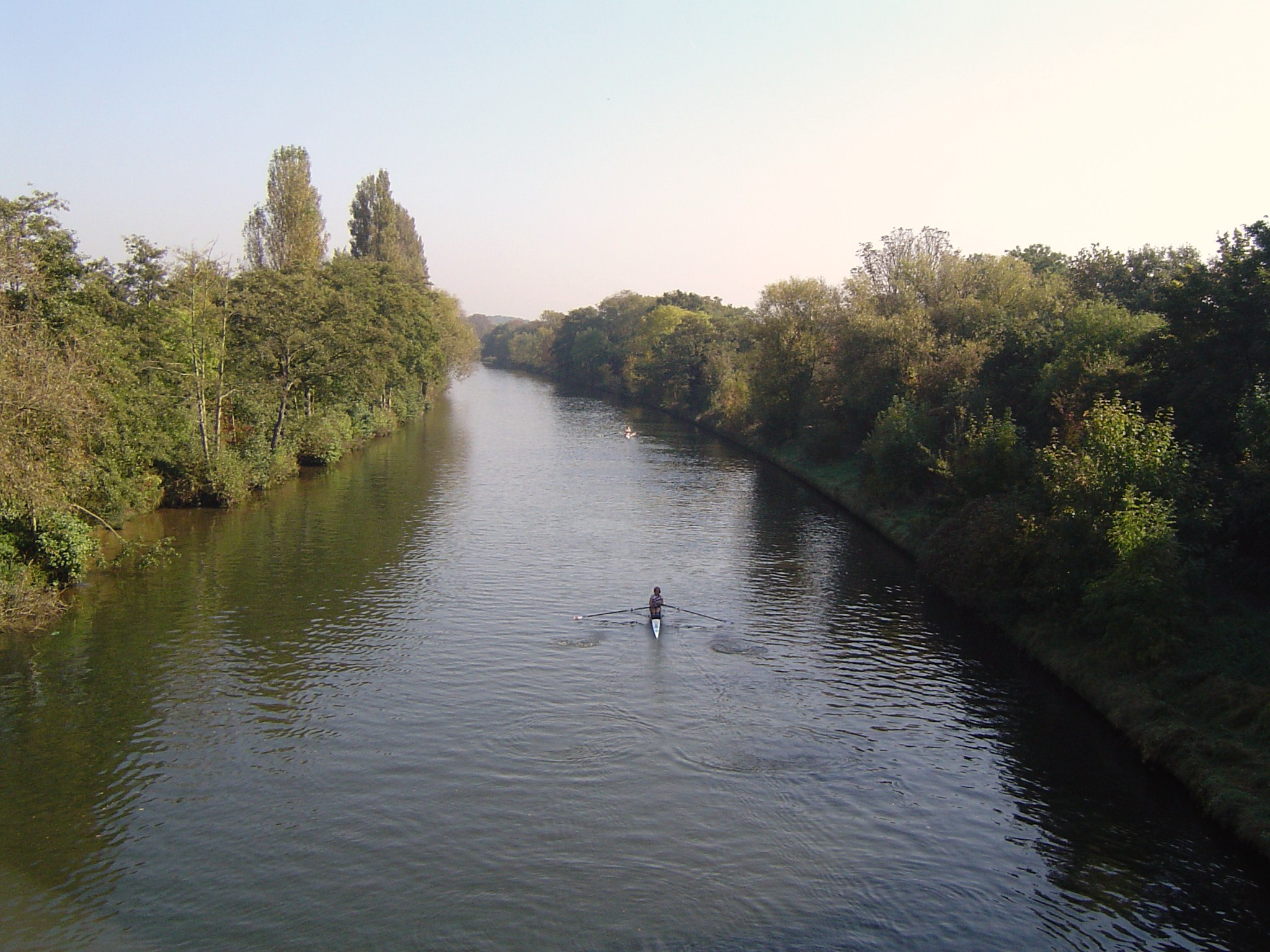
Desborough Cut from one of the bridges

The Desborough Cut is an artificial channel in the River Thames above Sunbury Lock near Walton on Thames in England. It was completed in 1935, to improve flow and ease navigation on the river.

The cut was dug between 1930 and 1935, taking the river on a straight course between Weybridge and Walton, and avoiding a meandering stretch past Shepperton and Lower Halliford. It is a very slight curve 1,093 metres (1,195 yd) long. Its geodesic length is 1,084 metres (1,185 yd) as the crow flies, and its construction created Desborough Island. Two bridges were built across the cut to link to the island, which contains a water treatment works and a large extent of open space used for recreation. The cut alleviated flooding in Shepperton and halved the distance of travel on that part of the river.

Navigation transit markers stand alongside it as a traditional method for powered boats to check their speed.

The cut and the adjacent island were named after Lord Desborough who was chairman of the Thames Conservancy at the time and who opened it.
