= Skiffing =

Type of rowing (of a boat)

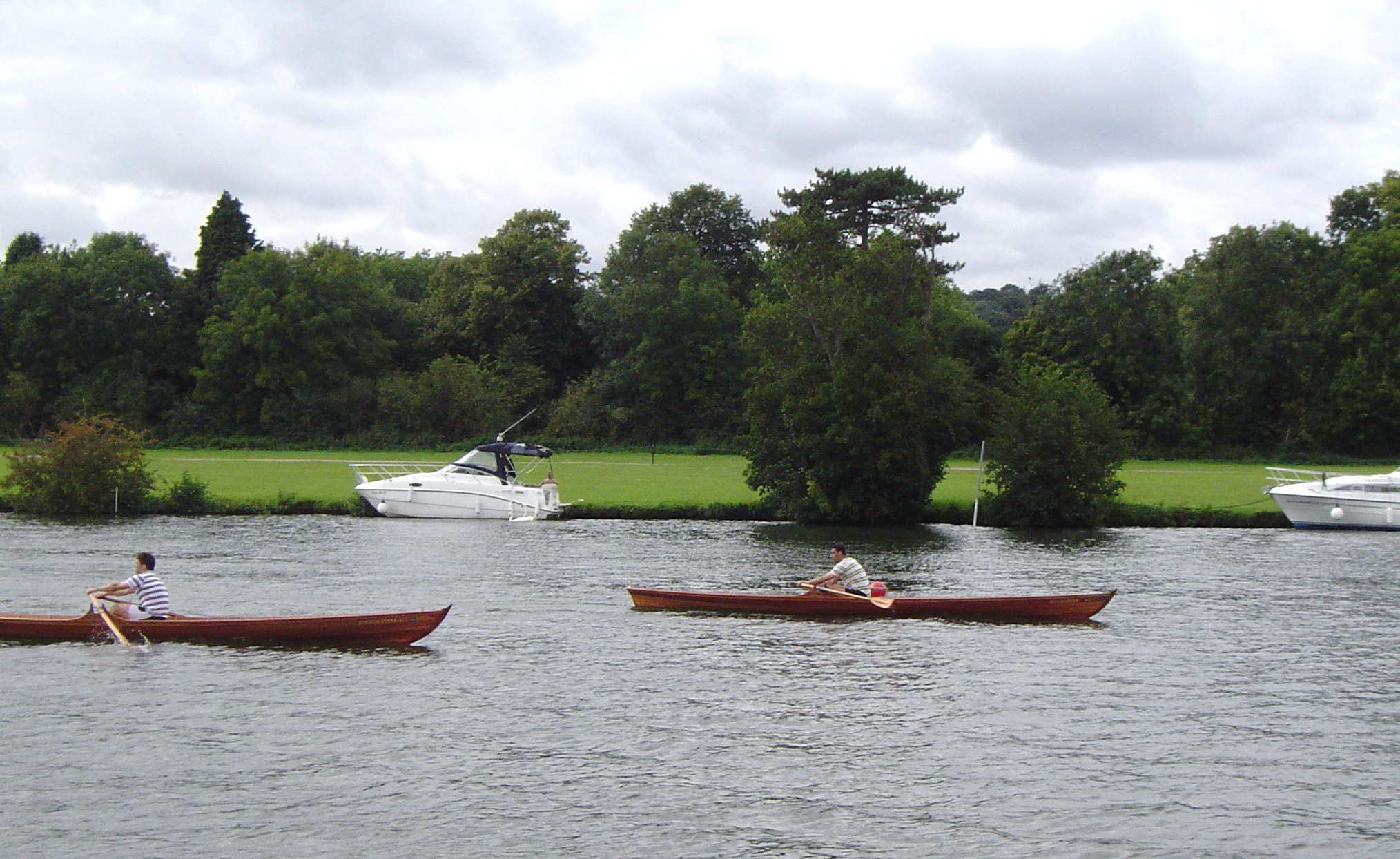
Final of the Gents Singles Championship at Henley on the River Thames

Skiffing refers to the sporting and leisure activity of rowing (or more correctly sculling) a Thames skiff. The skiff is a traditional hand built clinker-built wooden craft of a design which has been seen on the River Thames and other waterways in England and other countries since the 19th century. Sculling is the act of propelling the boat with a pair of oars (or blades), as opposed to rowing which requires both hands on a single oar.

== Skiffs ==
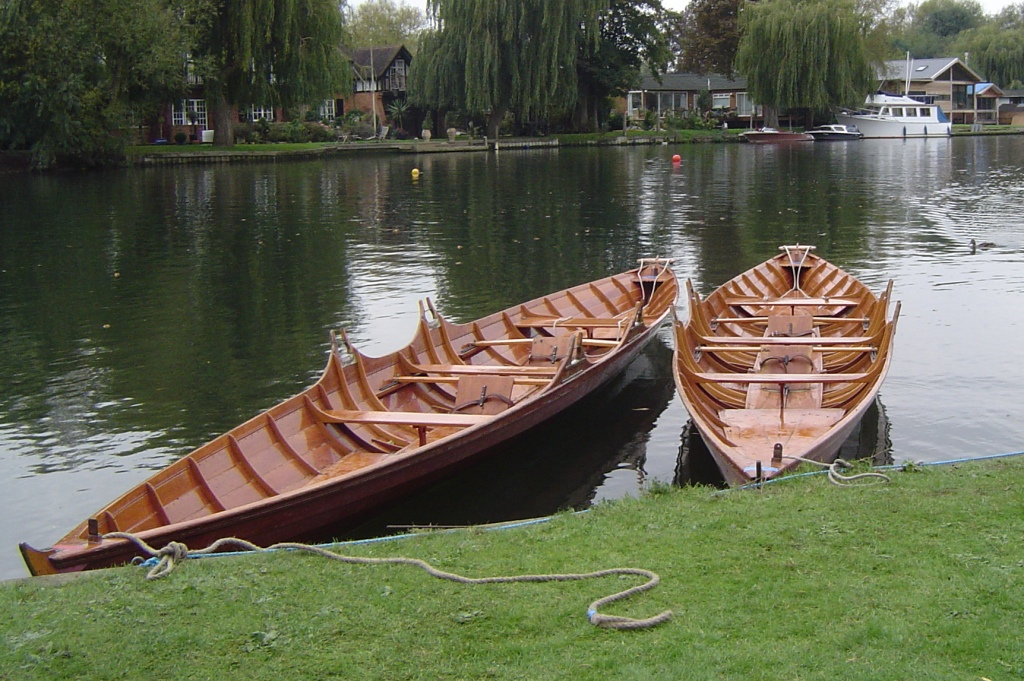
A pair of double racing skiffs

Thames skiffs were developed in the 19th century primarily for leisure use by private individuals sculling themselves. The design was based on the Thames wherries and shallops that were operated by watermen as a water taxi service in London. By the late 19th century, when Jerome K. Jerome wrote of his up-river expedition in Three Men in a Boat, there were thousands of skiffs at places like Richmond, Kingston and Oxford. However, there are references to skiffs (as a result of accidents) as early as 1812 and 1824 at Oxford. In August 1815, the poet Percy Bysshe Shelley was taken on a skiffing expedition from Old Windsor to Lechlade by Charles Clairmont and Thomas Love Peacock. He subsequently settled at Marlow where he regularly skiffed through the locks.

Skiffs have fixed rather than sliding seats, and the blades are held in thole pins at the side of the boat rather than outriggers. The blades are made of wood with leather collars and traditional spoons. Pressure is applied by the feet against an adjustable wooden plate known as a "stretcher board". Skiffs are usually "Singles" with one sculler, or "Doubles" with two scullers (one behind the other) and a cox. However skiffs with more scullers or incorporating a sail are also used. Skiffing takes place in the Netherlands and Argentina, using the design of traditional Thames skiff although Argentinian skiffs usually have outriggers instead of tholes.

== Skiffing technique ==
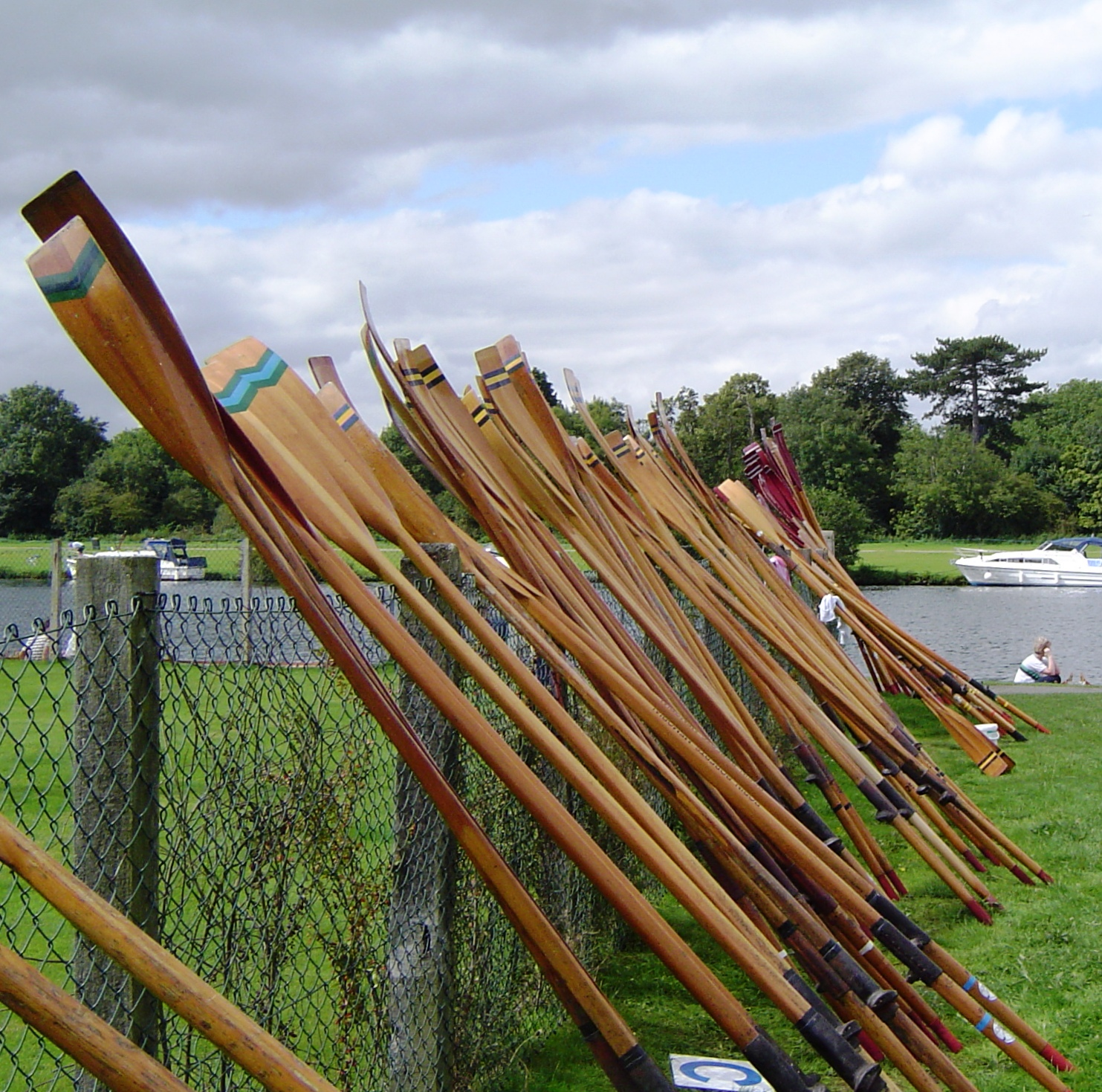
Collection of skiffing blades

The skiff is designed for optimum performance and so the technique applied is important. The two fundamental reference points in the stroke are the catch where the blade is placed in the water, and the 'finish' where the blade is removed from the water. The skiffer leans forward, and bends the legs slightly. After placing the blade vertically in the water at the catch, he or she applies pressure to stretcher, levering the blade in the water on the thole and leans back. This is called the drive phase of the stroke. Once the skiffer has pushed the blade as far forward in the water as possible, he or she extracts the oar from the water, and the recovery phase begins, setting up the skiffer's body for the next stroke. On the recovery, it is normal to tip the blade flat (known as "feathering"). There are some differences from the rowing stroke. The hands must never pass one above the other – one hand must always lead, or one of the blades will "dig" in the water. The seat does not slide and the unbending of the legs follows from the leaning back of the body. Finally skiffs are more stable so that it is possible to lean back further and keep the blade in the water for longer. The last extra distance provides considerable motive power to the boat, leading to the encouragement to "squeeze the finish".

== Skiffing for pleasure ==
Skiffs have the advantage of being able to carry loads and are stable enough to allow occupants to stand up and move about while on the water. Skiffing is therefore an ideal introduction to rowing and river sports. Skiffing provides an opportunity for both short and extended recreational outings on the Thames and other waterways in Britain. The Thames meander is an example of a long-distance skiff journey. For more leisurely progress, a camping skiff has an easily erectable canvas cover and is used for outdoor recreational activity holidays. The Thames Traditional Boat Society is particularly active in supporting recreational use of traditional boats like skiffs. Skiffs regularly take part in traditional boat events, in particular the Great River Race in London.

== Skiff racing ==
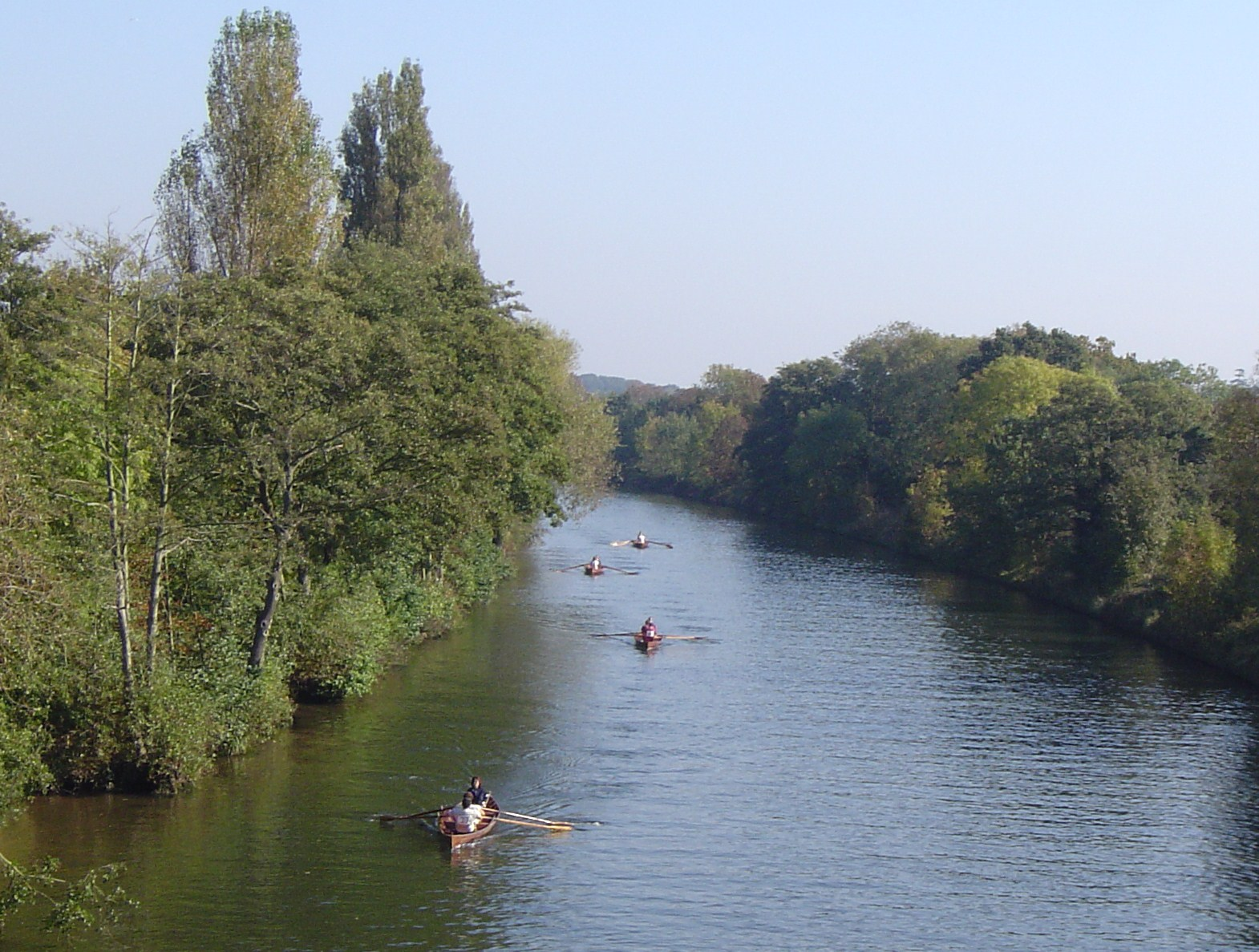
Long distance processional event

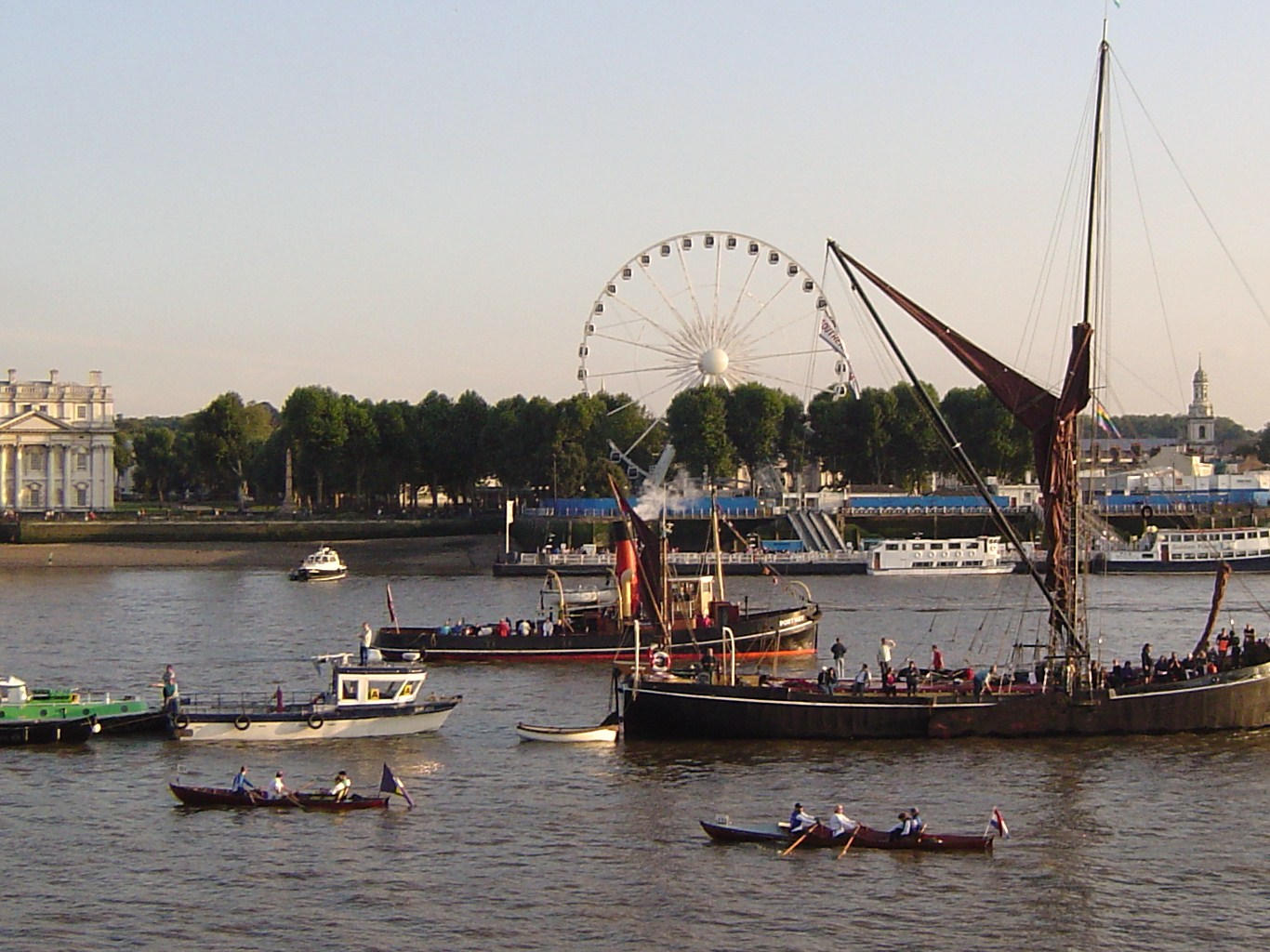
Dutch skiff and crew completing the Great River Race on the River Thames

Skiff racing provides the challenge of competition and an incentive for physical fitness. A Thames racing skiff is a version of the Thames skiff designed for racing purposes although it is still used recreationally. Racing is in single skiffs or doubles, and unlike in rowing, there are competitions for crews of mixed doubles.

Skiff racing in the United Kingdom is governed by the Skiff Racing Association, which was formed in 1901 to ensure that a standard set of rules was applied for racing and boat construction. The Association is run by a committee elected from the affiliated clubs and regattas, and is affiliated to the British Rowing (formerly ARA). The rules of racing are based on those of British Rowing closely enough that British Rowing qualified umpires may also umpire skiff races.

Competitions are held at a number of events on the River Thames between April and October. Events are competed at four status levels from Novice to Senior, allowing the opportunity to compete for anyone from complete beginners and Olympic rowing champions. There are two types of skiff race, long-distance and regattas. In long-distance processional events, crews set off at time intervals over a course of two or more miles. At regattas, skiff races are non-processional sprint races held over a distance of up to 800 yards with heats and finals. Regatta races usually have one skiff against another, although three lane racing may also occur. There are a number of Trophy competitions. The Ormiston Trophy is awarded to the Club that wins the highest number of events each season overall, while the Inter-Club competition is a separate event for top scullers in each club.

Several Olympic rowers began their careers in skiffs, including James Cracknell, Elise Laverick and Sarah Winckless. Many former British rowing team members continue to compete and exercise in skiffs.

=== Regattas ===
- Chertsey Regatta
- Egham Regatta
- Hampton Court and Dittons Regatta
- Sunbury Amateur Regatta
- Walton Reach Regatta
- Wargrave & Shiplake Regatta (Not affiliated to the SRA)
- Wraysbury and Old Windsor Regatta
- The Skiff Championships and Teddington Reach Regatta (held at Henley)
- Individual Club regattas

=== Long Distance events ===
- Simon Mepham Long Distance Mixed Doubles
- Sunbury Skiff & Punting Club 6K
- DSPC Long Distance Singles
- Tiny and Nancy Knight Competition
- Gordon Dear Mixed Doubles Marathon
- Wraysbury Long Distance Doubles
- Singles Marathon (Jack Rosewell Trophy)
- Doubles Marathon (Heldmann Trophy)

== Skiff Clubs ==
There are several English skiff clubs on the Thames and one in Cambridge.

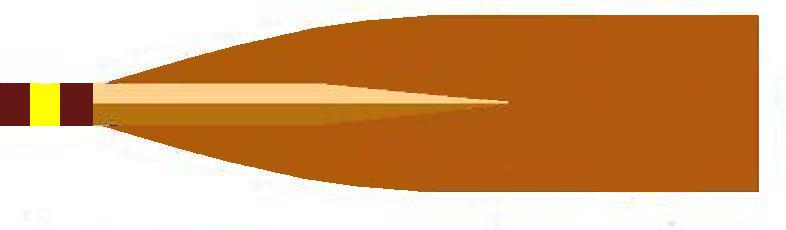
- The Skiff Club
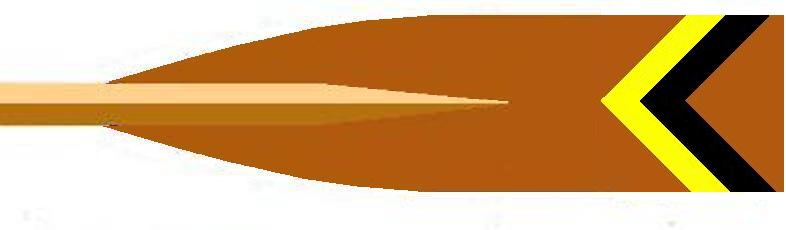
- Thames Valley Skiff Club
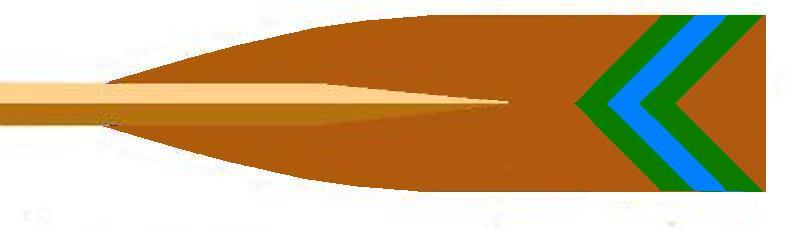
- Wraysbury Skiff and Punting Club
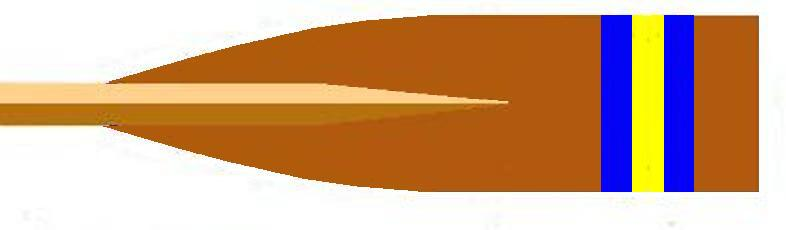
- Dittons Skiff and Punting Club
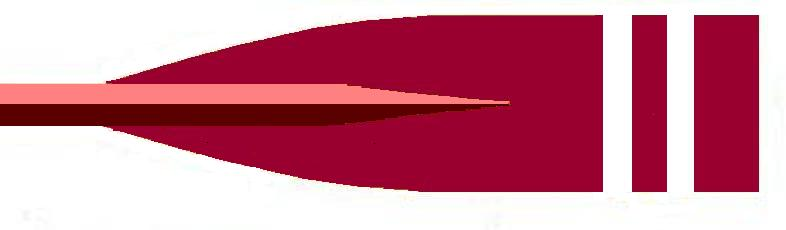
- Wargrave Boating Club
- Granta Skiff Club, Cambridge
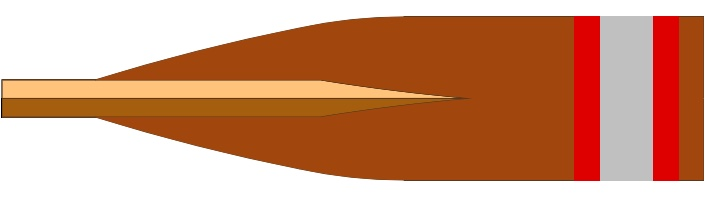
- Sunbury Skiff and Punting Club

All skiff clubs also include participation in the partner traditional river sport – punting. Clubs also encourage youngsters to take part in skiffs and rowing dinghies. Some clubs incorporate dongola racing, dragon boat racing and canoeing.

There are also rowing clubs in The Netherlands and Argentina that use Thames skiffs.

== See also ==
- Rowing on the River Thames
