= Sunbury-on-Thames =

Town in Surrey, England

Sunbury
- Town
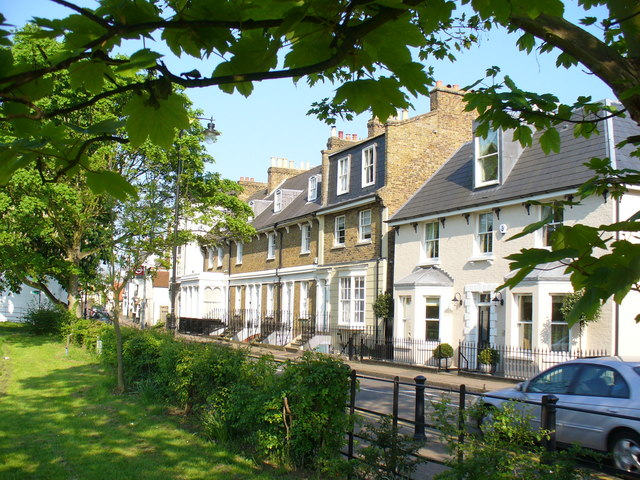
- Thames Street, Sunbury

- Location within Surrey
- Area: 7.60 km^{2} (2.93 sq mi)
- Population: 18,041 (2011 census)
  - Density: 2,374/km^{2} (6,150/sq mi)
- OS grid reference: TQ105695
  - London: 13 miles (21 km)
- District: Spelthorne
- Shire county: Surrey
- Region: South East
- Country: England
- Sovereign state: United Kingdom
- Post town: Sunbury-on-Thames
- Postcode district: TW16
- Dialling code: 01932
- Police: Surrey
- Fire: Surrey
- Ambulance: South East Coast
- UK Parliament: Spelthorne

Sunbury-on-Thames, known locally as Sunbury, is a town on the north bank of the River Thames in the Borough of Spelthorne, Surrey, England, 13 mi (21 km) southwest of central London. (Note: Charing Cross (part of the Trafalgar Square town square) to/from which distances are most commonly measured) Sunbury and other surrounding towns, historically part of the county of Middlesex, were in 1965 intended to form part of the newly created county of Greater London, but were instead transferred to Surrey. Sunbury adjoins Feltham to the north, Hampton to the east, Ashford to the northwest and Shepperton to the southwest. Walton-on-Thames is to the south, on the opposite bank of the Thames.

The town has two main focal points: Lower Sunbury (known locally as Sunbury Village), adjoining the river. Sunbury Common (known locally as Sunbury Cross) is to the north and surrounds Sunbury railway station and the London end of the M3 motorway. Lower Sunbury contains most of the town's parks, pubs and listed buildings, whereas Sunbury Common is more urban and includes offices and hotels. Lower Sunbury holds an annual fair and regatta each August.

Sunbury railway station is on the Shepperton branch line. Trains to and from London Waterloo are operated by South Western Railway.

== History ==
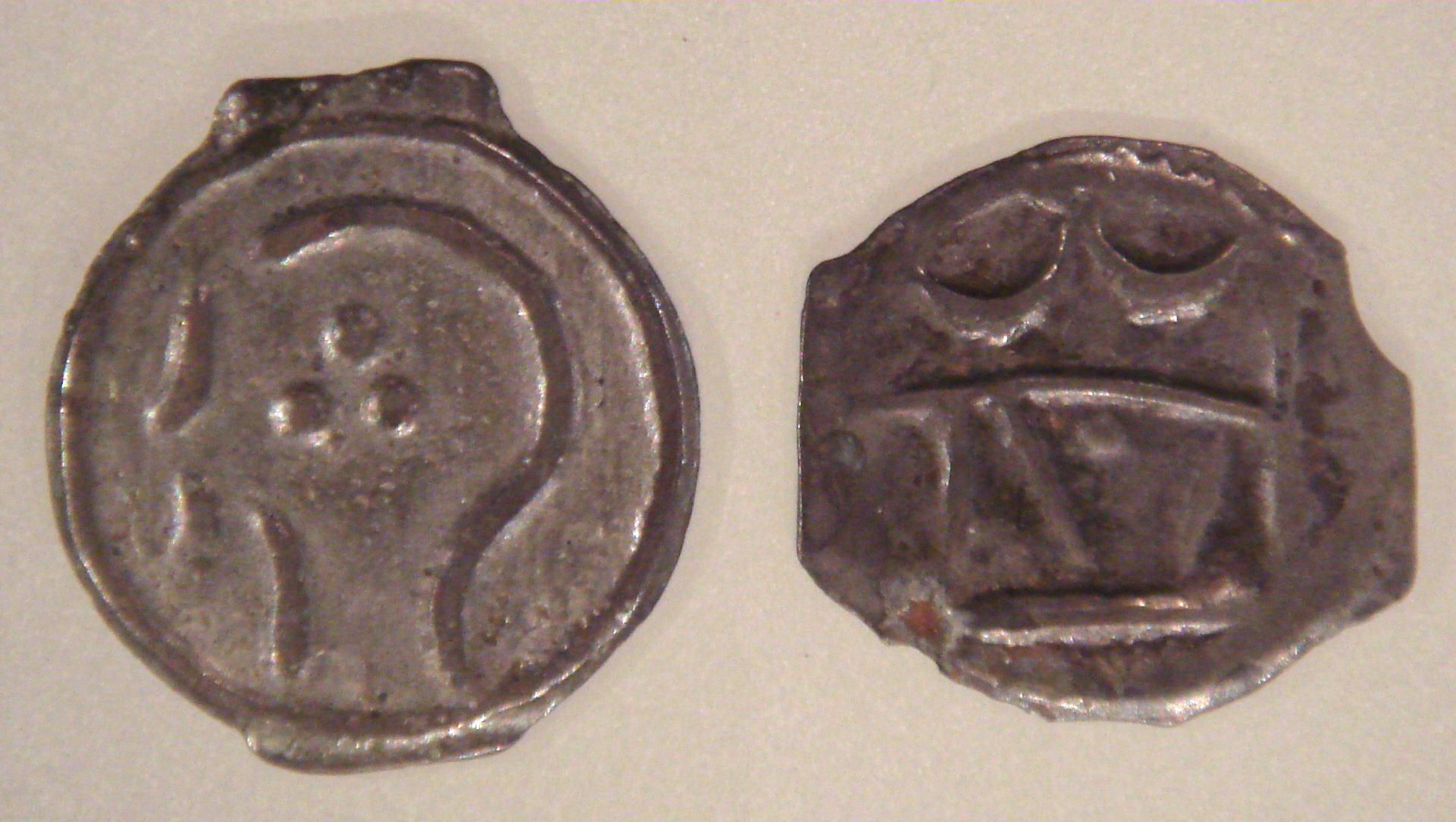
Coin from the Sunbury hoard, with design derived from Greek coins of Marseilles, with stylised head of Apollo and butting bull, 100–50 BC.

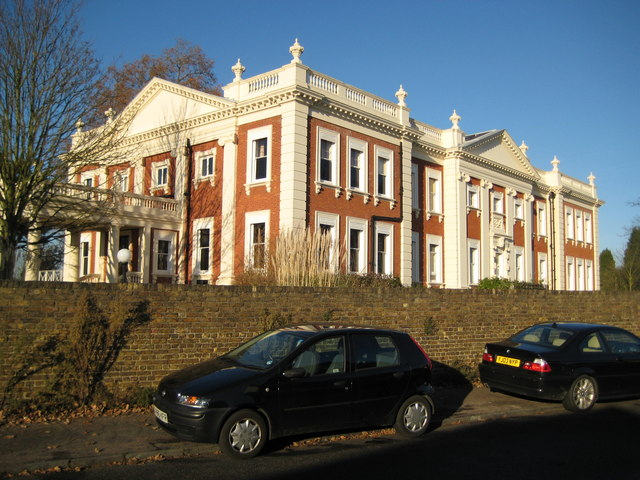
Sunbury Court Conference Centre, built in 1723

The earliest evidence of human settlement in Sunbury has been the discovery of Bronze Age funerary urns dating from the 10th century BCE in Green Lane, Sunbury Common. There is an important scheduled monument by Rooksmead Road, a prehistoric bowl barrow, known as Cloven Barrow, on low-lying ground that was part of the flood plain of the Thames, now around 1 km to the south. It has a circular mound approximately 14 metres (46 ft) in diameter and 2.5 metres (8 ft 2 in) high, surrounded by a ditch from which material used to build it was excavated. The ditch has become infilled over the years and survives as a buried feature up to 2 metres (6 ft 7 in) wide. The monument has been partly disturbed by modern gardening activities, and by the construction of a greenhouse on its western side. Cloven Barrow (Old English Clofenan Beorh, or the 'barrow with a cleft') was mentioned in an Anglo-Saxon document, known as the "Sunbury Charter", which has been dated to around AD 962.

The place-name 'Sunbury' is first attested in one of the many Anglo-Saxon charters, one of c. 960 to 962, where it appears as Sunnanbyrg. Another charter of 962 lists it as Sunnanbyrig. Sunbury appears in the Domesday Book of 1086 as Sunneberie. The name means 'Sunna's burgh or fortification'. The same first name is found in Sonning in Berkshire.

Sunbury's Domesday assets were: seven hides. It had five ploughs, meadow for six ploughs, and cattle pasture. It had about 22 households, including one priest and included the manor of Kempton, Kynaston, Chennes[-ton]/[-tone], Kenton or Kenyngton, listed separately. The manor rendered £6 per year to its feudal system overlords. That of Kempton rendered £4.

Lower Sunbury presented for two centuries, a mainly rural and quite gentrified village as is still visible in many conserved buildings and structures. Of particular note are the wealth and community ties of its parish church as well as many ornate and unusual houses and mansions (or mansion remains). The oldest homes are those from the Georgian era: throughout and for three decades after the 18th century, the time when the body of Sunbury's oldest church dates to – many of those on large plots of land have been demolished and subdivided.

Gilbert White described Sunbury, in The Natural History of Selborne, letter xii, 4 November 1767, as "one of those pleasant villages lying on the Thames, near Hampton Court".

In 1889, a group of music-hall stars met in the Magpie Hotel in Lower Sunbury to form the Grand Order of Water Rats. The pub-restaurant it has become was named after the horse that one of the entertainers owned, whilst the Grand Order was named because Magpie – a trotting pony owned by Richard Thornton, music hall owner – had been described as a drowned water rat. The Three Fishes in Green Street is one of the oldest pubs in Surrey, an officially protected building of the late 16th century.

In the twentieth century, kennels near Sunbury Cross in the town were used for keeping greyhounds for racing at the former stadia at Wandsworth, Charlton and Park Royal.

Sunbury-on-Thames is historically in Middlesex. Under the Local Government Act 1888, county councils were established in the following year, Sunbury being governed by the new Middlesex County Council. This was further refined by the creation of Sunbury-on-Thames Urban District in 1894. In 1965, all but three districts of Middlesex were absorbed into Greater London; Sunbury was one of these exceptions. For the area of Sunbury's urban district, the upper tier of local government has been the county of Surrey. Royal Mail ignored the change in 1965; the former postal county is Middlesex. Mention of any county in postal addresses is considered dated but widely practised in some areas. In 1974 the urban district was abolished; since that time it has been part of the Borough of Spelthorne.

== Topography and localities ==
Map of Sunbury-on-Thames: all of the land south and west of the red line marking the Greater London border and north of the blue curve of the Thames

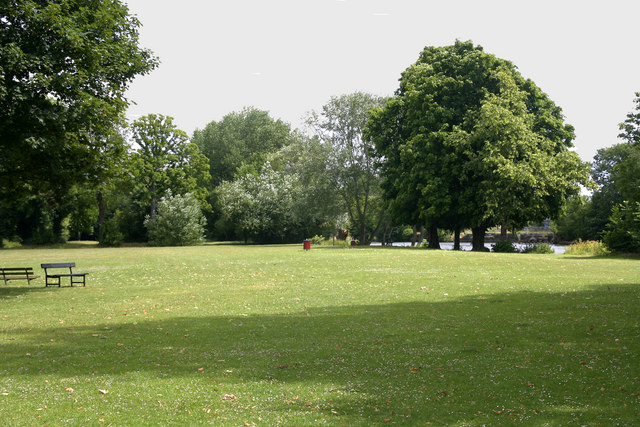
The island park – Rivermead Island

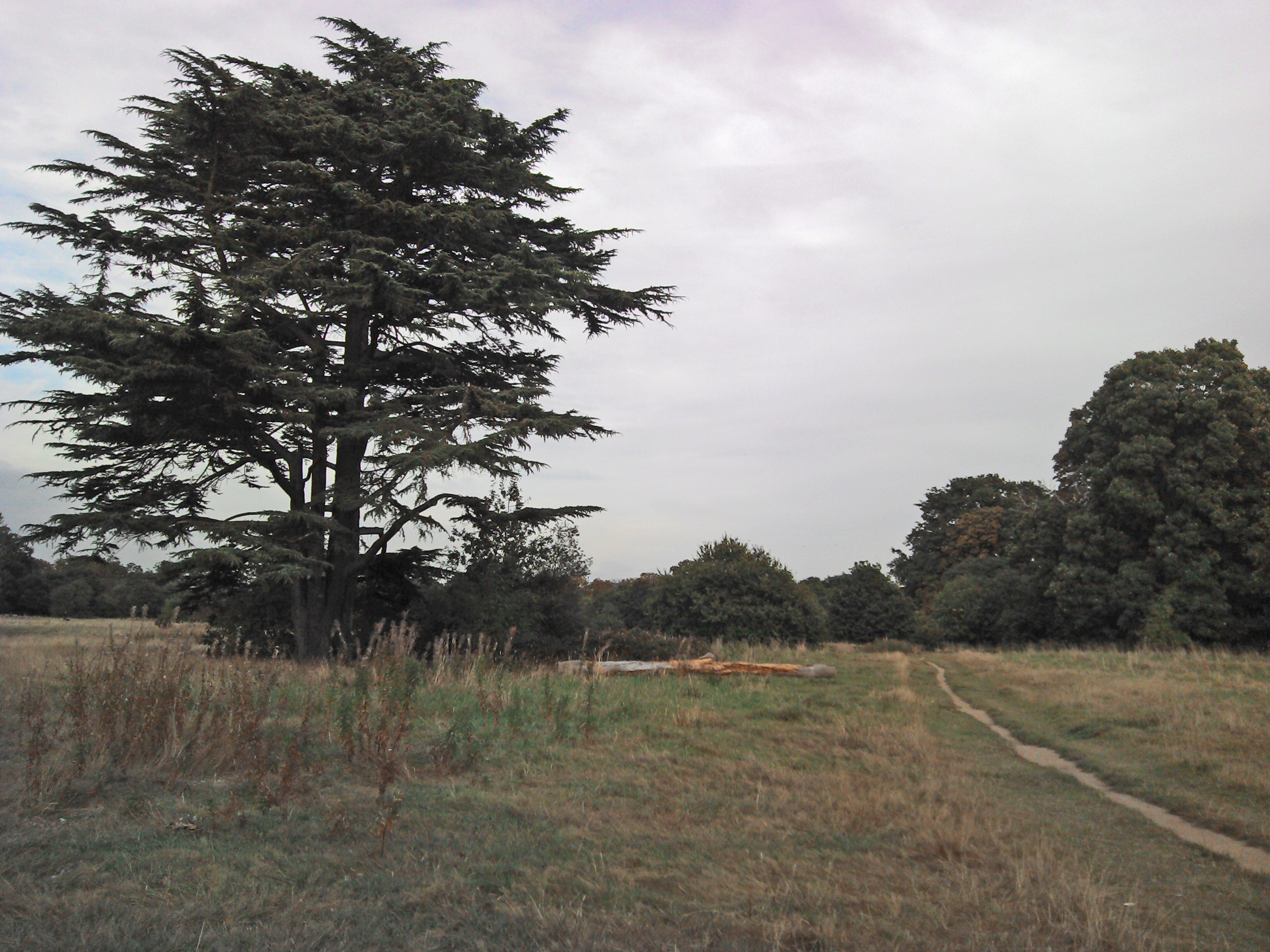
View of Sunbury Park

Sunbury is in part north and south of the M3, varying from 14 metres (46 ft) to 9 metres (30 ft) AOD, with a term for each part.

=== Lower Sunbury ===
Lower Sunbury, 51.411°N 0.409°W, locally known as 'Sunbury village', bordering the Thames and the M3, is just over half of the town forming an almost entirely green-buffered residential suburb which contains eight schools, including three of the six secondary schools in the Borough (or of the eight, if independent schools too are counted). Opposed to London, partially in Shepperton are parts of the Metropolitan Green Belt including four farms, a golf course, riverside horseriding centre at Beasley's Ait, the Swan Sanctuary, a rugby training centre and Upper Halliford's park. Lower Sunbury has one of the larger NHS medical general practitioner (GP) centres in the Borough. Football fields, playgrounds and tennis courts are in both halves of the town; London Irish rugby club is the main organised team in the village. Sunbury Park has dog-walking, cycle paths, parking and is in a cluster with five others including a tree-lined linear park, a modest, sloped riverside park and an adjoining café-served park. (Note: Hawke Park, Cedars Park, Orchard Meadow, the Walled Garden and the King's Lawn or Riverside)

The town has since 1932 been the home to London Irish, whose Premiership team since 2001 has played at the Madejski Stadium in Reading, Berkshire. Many hundreds of players train at Sunbury during the rugby season. Its eastern border is Kempton Park Racecourse which has on the far side of the town the main area of historic woodland and wildlife preservation, the Kempton Park Reservoirs SSSI, which blends into the park's own ponds, woods, Portman Brook and additional channels in the Green Belt.

The neighbourhood has a tapestry known as the Millennium Embroidery, which was conceived and designed in the 1990s and completed in 2000. Since July 2006 its permanent home has been the purpose-built Sunbury Millennium Embroidery Gallery, in a well-tended, free-to-visit Walled Garden adjoining Sunbury Park. The opening of a café within the gallery building, which architecturally resembles a boat, has increased the leisure time spent in the predominantly Georgian and early Victorian conservation area, the majority of which runs along Thames Street, a small section of which King's Lawn is a terraced public riverside. Fishing is permitted here for those with two Environment Agency licences. The Walled Garden hosts annual concerts, flower displays, events related to its facing Millennium Embroidery Café and occasionally plays in summer. Three public pools attract swimmers: Nuffield Health; You Fit (next to the Shepperton border); and Everyone Active's Sunbury Leisure Centre.

In July of each year, Lower Sunbury is the commencement point of the colourful traditional ceremony of Swan Upping, where two livery companies carry out marking of the swans on all upper reaches of the River Thames. In August, the traditional Sunbury Amateur Regatta takes place on the stretch of the river around Rivermead Island.

Lower Sunbury has similar property plot sizes to Shepperton and house prices as Hampton. Most property is 1930s–1960s semi-detached or detached houses with gardens on verge or tree-lined roads. The railway here benefits from seating at peak times but gives lower speed of access to the City of London relative to the South West Main Line developments of Elmbridge. Wide roads and parking provide strengths of the borough. The largest plots of garden measure only around an acre not covering any of the grassy plain, western outlying farms or boundary-lining trees in the far east and west. Lower Sunbury has numerous pubs, independent restaurants. A dog-free meadow permitting informal cricket and football is near the main parade of shops at which annual carols are held and at the regatta time in August a celebratory street market takes place.

=== Sunbury Common ===
51.421°N 0.422°W

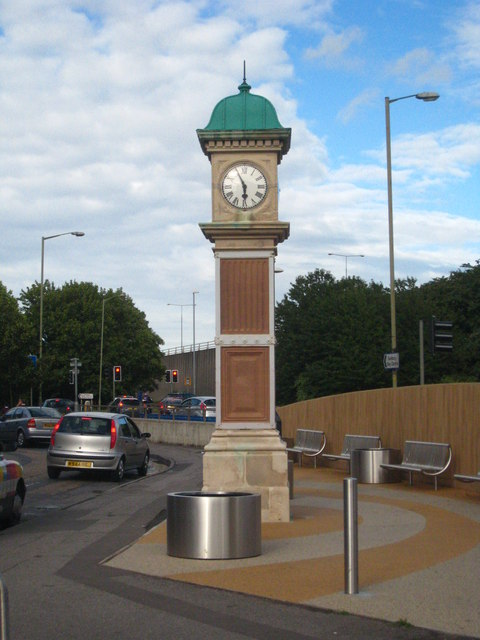
Clock tower at Sunbury Cross, erected in 1897 to commemorate Queen Victoria's Diamond Jubilee.

The northern section is Sunbury Common, patches of which remain, commanded by its four tower blocks and two hotels, overall with a mixed-use urban composition; it also houses major employers, including offices of Siemens, European Asbestos Solutions, Chubb and BP. The M3, with its inaugural junction at Sunbury Cross, sections off Lower Sunbury. Sunbury Common has a long, curved shopping parade that includes Marks & Spencer, Halfords, Farmfoods supermarket, Costa and Boots as well as beauty and nail salons. Also in this area, set off the main road, is a Tesco Extra.

North and east of the area is part of the green belt: a small farm and larger natural brookland habitat. Most of this area is in the adjoining London Borough of Hounslow, and was before the early 19th century part of distant Hanworth Park, historically part of Hounslow Heath. Its wild flower meadows, brooks and human-made troughs with wetland plants and insects form the Kempton Park Reservoirs SSSI. The operational Kempton Reservoirs and roads passing into Hampton form the rest of the town's eastern border, a buffer further south.

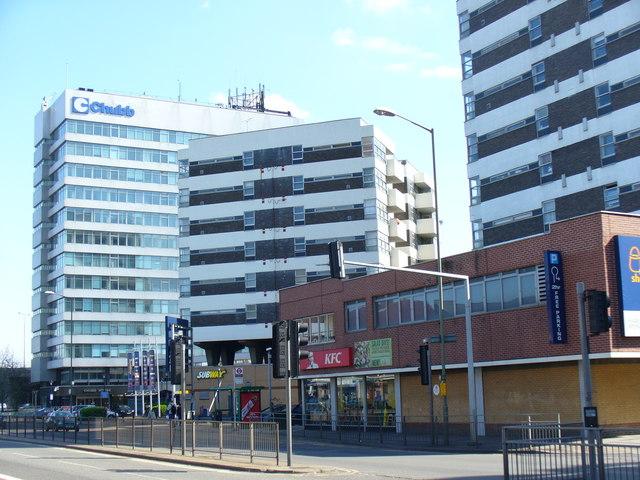
Sunbury Cross Centre in 2009. The former Chubb offices have since been converted to flats.

Sunbury here has five or six high-rise tower blocks: three residential (including the newly converted Chubb building) and two hotels. Similarly, it has industrial/business parks clustered generally in the acute angles between the M3/A316 (Country Way) and the A308 (Staines Road West). BP's Engineering and Research Centre in the north replaced Meadhurst House and gardens occupied by the Cadbury family and has evolved into BP's international centre for business and technology across a number of landscaped units. A number of other major companies have premises.

Marking the western border of the Upper Halliford/Charlton parts of Sunbury ecclesiastical and historic parish – though no longer by the town – is the Queen Mary Reservoir, which was constructed from 1914 to 1925 and is home to a sailing club regularly used by schools and youth organisations to teach water sports.

== Landmarks ==
=== Anglican church ===
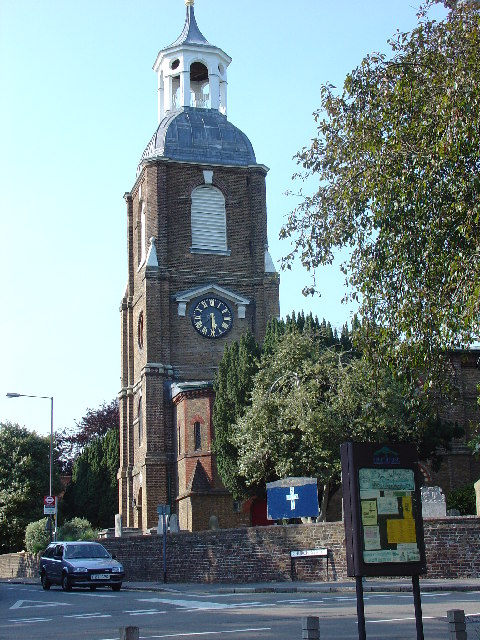
St Mary's Church, Sunbury

St Mary's Church was built originally in the medieval period, to which its foundations date. It was entirely rebuilt in 1752, designed by Stephen Wright (Clerk of Works to Hampton Court Palace); it has a tall apsidal (dome-like) chancel with a south chapel and western extensions to aisles added in extensive remodelling designed by architect Samuel Sanders Teulon in 1857. A solitary central monument in the church itself is to Lady Jane Coke (died 1761), stained glass and a vestry much extended in the early 20th century. It is a listed building in the mid-category, grade II*.

=== Sunbury Court ===
Sunbury Court in Lower Sunbury (b.1723) is the home of the high council of the Salvation Army since 1925.

=== Hawke House ===
Sunbury has the main home, Hawke House, of Admiral Hawke who blockaded Rochefort in 1757 and in 1758 he directed the blockade of Brest for six months. Its three parts are Georgian buildings with small gardens to front and rear. The vast bulk of the land behind and across the road belonging to the house was re-planned in stages in the mid 20th century as private detached homes with gardens.

=== Millennium Embroidery ===
Its own modernist gallery contains the wall-dominating commissioned artwork, a substantial tapestry, that commemorates Sunbury's ascension to the third millennium. It was designed by John Stamp and David Brown to be a large patchwork of Sunbury landmarks, including St. Mary's Church, the Admiral Hawke/Hawke House and the river. The finished piece is actually composed of several embroideries, the largest of which measures 9 by 3 feet (3 m × 1 m). It took four years to complete and enlisted the help of over 140 volunteers and artists. Queen Elizabeth II visited the embroidery in 2001 and the gallery built for it in 2006.

=== Wheatley's Ait ===
This residential island of Sunbury is one of the longest on the River Thames and is divided into two sections by a storm weir. It is connected by a wide footbridge. The main weir, maintained and owned by the Environment Agency, connects the downstream end of the island to Sunbury Lock Ait, which is almost uninhabited, and is within the modern parish bounds of Walton and has the Middle Thames Yachting and Motorboat Club.

=== Sunbury Court Island ===
Sunbury Court Island, as with most of Sunbury's riverside, privately owned, is another residential island, connected by a narrow arched footbridge well above river level.

=== Sunbury House ===
An abortive proposal for this western part of the manor was designed by Sir Christopher Wren to be the local army barracks but not built. Sunbury House was a large building with gardens and allotments covering the rectangle of land between Thames Street, Green Street, Forge Lane and Halliford Road. It was leased in 1855 by the Bishop family, who had owned it since its 1789 commencement of construction for Charles Bishop, HM Procurator General, to Captain Auguste Frederic Lendy, a French officer, who, with the assistance of the exiled French Royal family (living at Orleans House) founded a military academy.

This was a period when military commissions were still bought and sold, and training of officers in the army itself was quite rudimentary, so these establishments existed to teach students the necessary skills before taking up their posts.

On New Year's Eve 1915 the house was largely destroyed by a flood which only the two wings survived. One of these was later demolished, the remaining large west wing becoming a nursing home in two parts: Sunbury House which has not yet been listed and West Lodge almost entirely late 18th century and a building listed in the initial category at grade II.

== Education ==
=== State schools ===
==== Primary schools ====
The town has six primary schools:

==== Secondary schools ====
- St. Paul's Catholic College, voluntary aided
- Sunbury Manor School, Foundation school, a specialist humanities school
- The Bishop Wand Church of England School, voluntary aided

=== Independent schools ===
Selective secondary independent schools (of approximately equal distance of less than three miles from the centre) are Hampton School (for boys) and Lady Eleanor Holles School (for girls) in Hampton, Sir William Perkins's School (for girls) in Chertsey, Halliford School (for boys) in Shepperton and St James Senior Boys School in Ashford.

Local preparatory schools include Hampton Preparatory School, formerly Denmead School in Hampton (part of the Hampton School Trust), Newland House School in Twickenham, Twickenham Preparatory School in Hampton, and Staines Preparatory School in Staines-upon-Thames. An alternative, progressive form of independent education for boys and girls aged 3 to 18, is provided by St Michael Steiner School in Hanworth Park.

== Leisure ==
=== Sport and fitness ===
- The Hazelwood Centre home of London Irish Amateur Rugby Club and training grounds and headquarters of London Irish
- Sunbury cricket club
- Sunbury and Walton Hawks Hockey Club
- Nuffield Health Club (private sector membership club)
- Everyone Active Sunbury Leisure Centre (private-public enterprise)

=== Other ===
- Kempton Park Racecourse – National Hunt and Flat horse racing, November fair with fireworks and reindeer racing
- 1st Sunbury Scouts
- 5th Sunbury Scouts
- Guiding
- West Surrey Racing – touring car racing
- 862 (Sunbury) Air Training Corps
- Sunbury Riding School – horse riding

=== River Thames ===
- Sunbury Skiff and Punting Club and Sunbury Amateur Regatta
- Licensed rod fishing
- Motor boat hire

=== Sharing a border ===
- Hampton & Kempton steam train children's railway
- Kempton Park Steam Engines museum
- Staines Rugby Football Club
- Middle Thames Yacht (motorboat) club
- Walton Rowing Club
- Walton Casuals Football Club

=== Within historic boundary ===
- Sunbury Golf Club

== Entertainment ==
- The Riverside Arts Centre: theatre, amateur dramatics society; classical, jazz and blues music (see above)
- Live music at public houses (see above)

== In literature ==
The riverside St Mary's Anglican Church and the Ferry House nearby are mentioned in the book Oliver Twist by Charles Dickens.

Sunbury's islands and the ardour of rowing up Sunbury backwater (weir stream) to access the public riverside are mentioned in Three Men in a Boat by Jerome K. Jerome.

Sunbury is the setting for the 1890 novel Kit and Kitty by R. D. Blackmore.

Sunbury is passed through briefly in H. G. Wells's The War of the Worlds, where it is described to have been partially covered in heavy, inky vapour by the Martians.

Sunbury is mentioned in the opening chapter of Rural Rides by farmers' champion William Cobbett: "All Middlesex is ugly, notwithstanding the millions upon millions which it is continually sucking up from the rest of the kingdom; and though the Thames and its meadows now-and-then are seen from the road, the country is not less ugly from Richmond to Chertsey-bridge, through Twickenham, Hampton, Sunbury and Sheperton [sic], than it is elsewhere. The soil is a gravel at bottom with a black loam at top near the Thames; further back it is a sort of spewy gravel; and, the buildings consist generally of tax-eaters showy, tea-garden-like boxes, and of shabby dwellings of labouring people, who in this part of the country look to be about half Saint Giles's: dirty, and have every appearance of drinking gin." A few years after Cobbett's death Thomas Babington wrote in 1843, "An acre in Middlesex is worth a principality in Utopia" which contrasts neatly with its agricultural caricature.

== Notable people ==
Person	Home	Decade when last resident
Thomas Bromley, 2nd Baron Montfort – MP for Cambridge and landowner	(demolished) Montford or Montford House	1790s
Dominic Bruce – Colditz escaper	Blakesley Lodge, Green Street	1990s
Eddie Calvert – jazz and swing trumpet player	Minka	1950s
Sir John Chardin, 1st Baronet (died 1755) and direct heir Sir Philip Musgrave, 6th Baronet, MP for Westmoreland (c. 1712–1795)	(demolished) Kempton Park	1790s
William Dudley Ward, MP for Southampton and wife Freda, lover of the Prince of Wales, later Edward VIII. The Prince of Wales stayed across Thames Street in Pomfret Cottage.	Monksbridge	1950s
Mal Evans – Beatles road manager and assistant (d. 1976 in shooting in Los Angeles)		1970s
Adam Faith – singer and actor	Elizabeth Gardens	1960s
David Gilmour – guitarist and lead singer of Pink Floyd	Monksbridge	1980s
John Glen – director and film editor		2010s
Joe Gormley – trade union leader (NUM)		2000s
Karl Green – bassist of Herman's Hermits	The Avenue	2010s
Edward Hawke, 1st Baron Hawke – ennobled admiral commanding the Battle of Quiberon Bay in the Seven Years' War, resident throughout later life	Hawke House	1780s
Gordon Hill – Manchester United and England footballer		1970s
Ian Humphreys – rugby union player		2010s
Tom Jones – singer	Springfield Grove	1960s
Kerry Norton – actress and singer		1990s
Topsy Ojo – rugby union player		2005 – present
Colin Pattenden – Bassist of Manfred Mann's Earth Band	The Dormer House	2010s
Vickery Turner, a British actress, playwright, author and theatre director (born 3 April 1940 in Sunbury-on-Thames)		
Nicola Tyers before marriage to Lord Colwyn		1970s
Norman Willis – Trade Union Congress general secretary and President of the European Trade Union Confederation		2010s
Gary Wilmot, singer and musical actor	French Street	2000s
Dickie Valentine – singer	Green Street	1960s
Henry White, 1st Baron Annaly – Peninsular War (Napoleonic War) soldier and MP	(demolished) Sunbury Park House	1870s
Marland Yarde – rugby union player		2010s

== Demography and housing ==
2011 census homes
Output area/ward	Detached	Semi-detached	Terraced	Flats and apartments	Caravans/temporary/mobile homes	Shared between households
Sunbury Common	243	996	1,056	864	1	3
Sunbury Centre and East (Spelthorne 010)	1,213	983	388	633	2	0
South-west (Spelthorne 011D)	173	222	101	88	26	0
West (011B)	155	98	207	126	2	0

The average level of accommodation in the region composed of detached houses was 28%, the average that was apartments was 22.6%.

Output area/ward	Population	Households	% Owned outright	% Owned with a loan	hectares
Sunbury Common	8,076	3,163	24.0	37.8	174
Sunbury Centre and East	6,798	2,831	41.9	37.8	366
South-west (011D)	1,580	641	39.8	40.9	92
West (Spelthorne 011B)	1,587	656	40.5	45.1	128

The proportion of households in the settlement who owned their home outright compares to the regional average of 35.1%. The proportion who owned their home with a loan compares to the regional average of 32.5%. The remaining % is made up of rented dwellings (plus a negligible % of households living rent-free).

== Transport ==
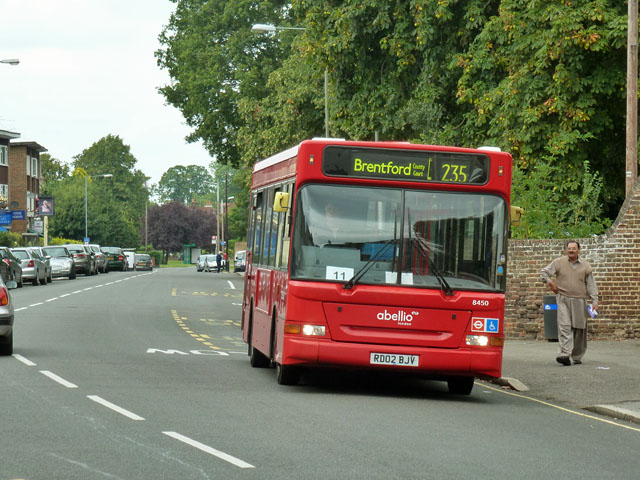
Abellio London route 235 bus leaving its terminus in Sunbury

=== Road ===
- A316, becomes the start of the M3 motorway.
- A308, directions towards Staines-upon-Thames and Kingston-upon-Thames.
- A244, directions towards Hounslow and Walton-on-Thames.

=== Rail ===
- Sunbury
- Kempton Park

=== Bus ===
Although Sunbury is officially outside London, it is predominantly served by three Transport for London bus routes:

- 216 (Staines-upon-Thames – Kingston upon Thames)
- 235 (starts at Sunbury and runs to North Brentford Quarter)
- 290 (Staines-upon-Thames – Twickenham; serves Sunbury Cross).

In addition, two other local bus routes serve Sunbury:

- 555 (Hatton Cross Station – Walton-on-Thames)
- 557 (Heathrow Terminal 5 – Woking)

=== Air ===
- Heathrow Airport is 5 miles away from its centre.

== Emergency services ==
Sunbury is served by these emergency services:

- Surrey Police (it was within the boundary of the Metropolitan Police district until 2000).
- South East Coast Ambulance Service as of 1 July 2006, formed from the former Surrey Ambulance Service, Sussex, and Kent Ambulance services.
- Surrey Fire & Rescue Service.

== See also ==
- Institute of Telecommunications Professionals
