= Thames skiff =

English river boat

A Thames skiff is a traditional River Thames wooden rowing boat used for skiffing. These boats evolved from Thames wherries in the Victorian era to meet a passion for river exploration and leisure outings on the water.

== Construction ==
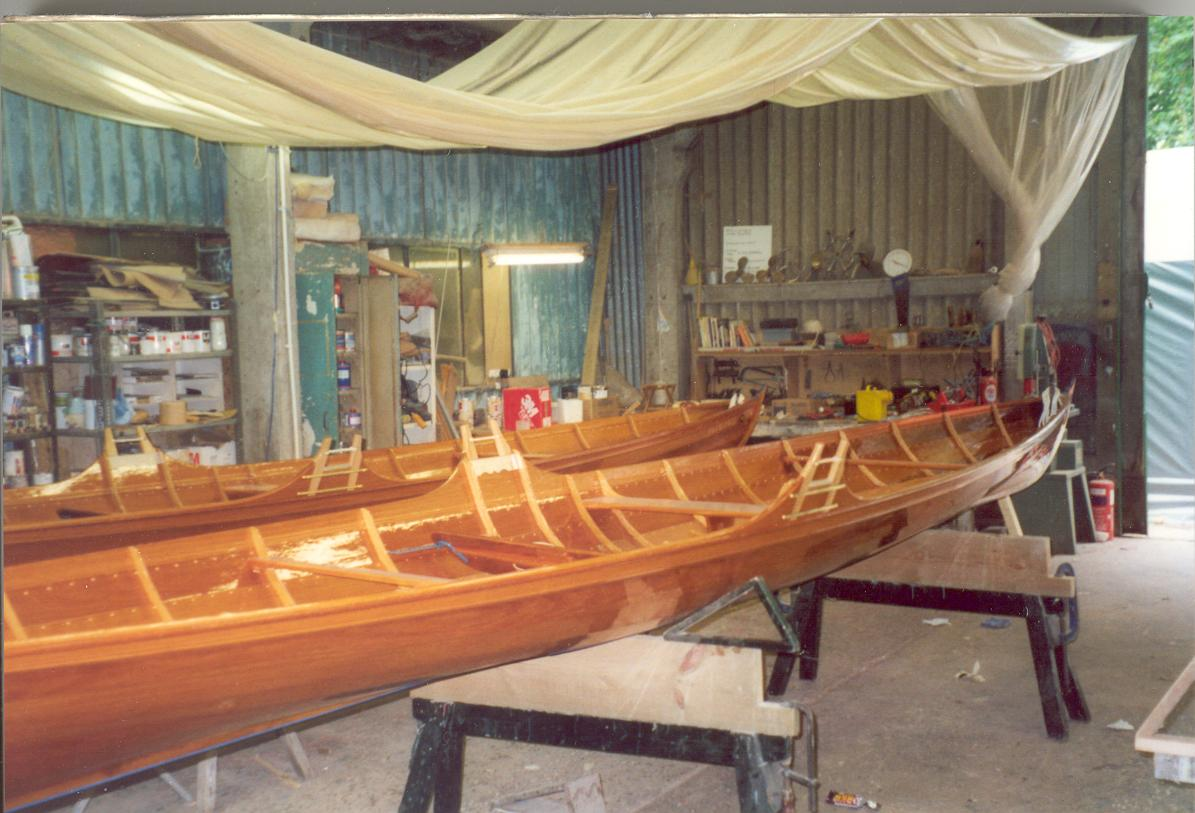
Newly built single racing skiffs

The Thames skiff owes its origins to the clinker boat building technique, of over-lapping timber planking, that's known to have existed in the region from before the 6th century Anglo-Saxon Snape and Sutton Hoo ship burials. Many of the terms used for parts of the skiff are of Germanic origin – "tholes", "thwarts", and "sax". Planks on either side of a wooden keel are laid down following the outline of a sham (temporary pattern) placed across the keel. The planks are nailed in place and then a transverse strengthening framework of ribs is added. Oars (or blades) are held in place by wooden thole pins at the side of the boat rather than rowlocks or outriggers. The thole pins are designed to give way if too much pressure is put on them, thus protecting the boat itself from damage. The thwart, or seat, is fixed rather than sliding as in modern boats. The sax runs round the top of the boat to strengthen and protect it. Blades are made of wood with leather collars.

Skiffs usually provide for one or two scullers but because they have been built to individual customer's specifications, there can be a wide variety of designs. There are skiffs with three or four rowing positions. Skiffs with more than one sculler have a seat for a coxswain who steers the boat by ropes attached to a rudder. Single scullers usually steer themselves, but some single skiffs allow for a cox/passenger as well. Some skiffs also provide for a sail to be used.

Skiffs following the traditional Thames design are to be found in the Netherlands and Argentina, although Argentinian skiffs usually have outriggers instead of tholes.

== Uses and types ==
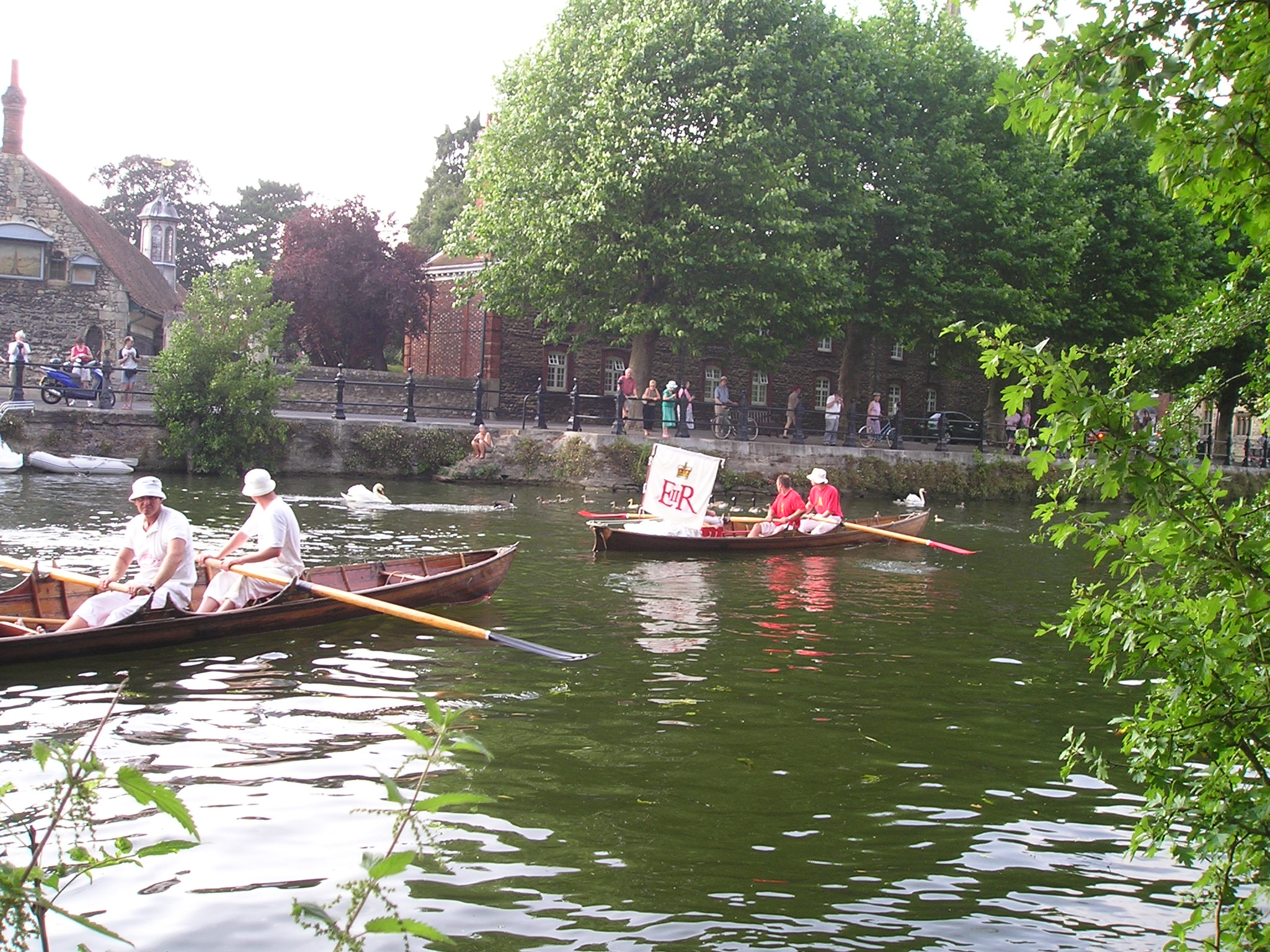
Swan upping in skiffs

Skiffs are both recreational and working boats on the Thames. They can be seen used for swan upping and other general purpose duties. Racing skiffs are specially built for skiffing in competitions at regattas and long-distance marathon events between the various skiff clubs under The Skiff Racing Association rules along the Thames and also for recreational purposes such as a Thames meander.

A camping skiff has an easily erectable canvas cover and is used for outdoor recreational activity holidays, often in conjunction with other activities such as walking, swimming and fishing. The cover can be used for shelter from the sun and rain during the day and at night converts the entire craft into a floating tent. It enables the occupants to experience nature and river life up close and is featured in Jerome K. Jerome's 1889 comic novel Three Men in a Boat.
