= List of Greater London boundary changes =

Map of London

This is a list of boundary changes occurring in the London region of England, since the re-organisation of local government following the passing of the London Government Act 1963.

== Administrative boundaries ==
=== Adjustments permitted by the London Government Act 1963 ===
Greater London was created by combining whole existing units of local government and it was anticipated that this might provide an arbitrary boundary in some places. The London Government Act 1963 Section 6 (4) provided a mechanism for communities on the edge of Greater London to petition for transfer to a neighbouring county. The legislation required the petition to be submitted between 1965 and 1970, to be signed by more than 300 local electors and for the area to be transferred to have no more than 10% of the borough's local electors. These were completed in 1969 as the transfers of Knockholt to Kent, and of Farleigh and Hooley to Surrey. Section 6 (3) of the act allowed for transfers between Greater London and neighbouring counties where there was consensus for the change between all the relevant local authorities. This power was used to exchange two islands on the River Thames that were connected to the river bank by bridges on the opposite side of the river to their respective counties. Thames Ditton Island was transferred to Surrey from Greater London and Platts Eyot was transferred the other way.

Date	Statutory Instrument	Effect
1 April 1965	London Government Act 1963	Greater London created from the County of London, most of Middlesex and parts of Essex, Kent, Surrey and Hertfordshire
1 April 1969	The Greater London, Kent and Surrey Order, 1968	Changes to the: Bromley (Greater London)/Sevenoaks Rural District (Kent) boundary; Croydon (Greater London)/Godstone Rural District (Surrey) boundary; Croydon (Greater London)/Banstead Urban District (Surrey) boundary; Transfer of Knockholt to Kent; Farleigh and Hooley to Surrey
1 April 1970	The Greater London and Surrey Order, 1970	Changes to the Richmond upon Thames (Greater London)/Esher Urban District (Surrey) boundary Thames Ditton Island from Greater London to Surrey and Platts Eyot from Surrey to Greater London

=== Principal Area Boundary Reviews ===
The Local Government Boundary Commission for England (or LGBCE) was established by the Local Government Act 1972 to review the administrative boundaries of every local authority in England. Between 1974 and 1992 they completed a series of Principal Area Boundary Reviews; reviewing the administrative boundaries of local authorities at their request.

Date	Statutory Instrument	Effect	LGBCE Report(s)
1 April 1982	The Greater London and Buckinghamshire (Areas) Order 1981	Changes to the Hillingdon (Greater London)/South Bucks (Buckinghamshire) boundary	January 1981

=== Mandatory Reviews of non-Metropolitan Counties, Metropolitan Districts and London Boroughs ===
In 1985, the Commission began the first full administrative review of all non-metropolitan counties. Their reviews of metropolitan counties and Greater London began in 1987 and both reviews were completed in 1992.

Date	Statutory Instrument	Effect	LGBCE Report(s)
1 April 1993	The Greater London and Kent (County Boundaries) Order 1992	Changes to the Bexley (Greater London)/Dartford (Kent) boundary	Report No. 598: Bexley January 1991
1 April 1993	The Greater London and Hertfordshire (County Boundaries) Order 1992	Changes to the: Barnet (Greater London)/Hertsmere (Hertfordshire) boundary; Harrow (Greater London)/Hertsmere (Hertfordshire) boundary	Report No. 594: Barnet January 1991
1 April 1993	The Greater London and Hertfordshire (County and District Boundaries) Order 1992	Changes to the: Harrow (Greater London)/Hertsmere (Hertfordshire) boundary; Ealing/Harrow (both Greater London) boundary; Harrow/Hillingdon (both Greater London) boundary	Report No. 610: Harrow October 1991
1 April 1994	The Barnet, Camden and Westminster (London Borough Boundaries) Order 1993	Changes to the: Camden/Barnet (both Greater London) boundary; Camden/Westminster (both Greater London) boundary	Report No. 656: Camden June 1992
1 April 1994	The Bexley and Greenwich (London Borough Boundaries) Order 1993	Changes to the Bexley/Greenwich (both Greater London) boundary	Report No. 622: Greenwich (Thamesmead) January 1992
1 April 1994	The Bromley and Greenwich (London Borough Boundaries) Order 1993	Changes to the Bromley/Greenwich (both Greater London) boundary	Report No. 642: Greenwich (Mottingham) May 1992
1 April 1994	The Bromley and Lewisham (London Borough Boundaries) Order 1993	Changes to the Bromley/Lewisham (both Greater London) boundary	Report No. 641: Bromley (Lewisham) May 1992
1 April 1994	The Bromley, Croydon, Lambeth, Lewisham and Southwark (London Borough Boundaries) Order 1993	Changes to the: Bromley/Croydon (both Greater London) boundary; Bromley/Lambeth (both Greater London) boundary; Bromley/Lewisham (both Greater London) boundary; Bromley/Southwark (both Greater London) boundary	Report No. 632: Crystal Palace April 1992
1 April 1994	The City and London Borough Boundaries Order 1993	Changes to the: City of London/Camden (Greater London) boundary; City of London/Hackney (Greater London) boundary; City of London/Islington (Greater London) boundary; City of London/Tower Hamlets (Greater London) boundary; City of London/Westminster (Greater London) boundary	Report No. 636: City of London April 1992
1 April 1994	The Croydon, Lambeth and Southwark (London Borough Boundaries) Order 1993	Changes to the: Lambeth/Croydon (both Greater London) boundary; Lambeth/Southwark (both Greater London) boundary	Report No. 623: Croydon (Lambeth) February 1992; Report No. 624: Lambeth February 1992
1 April 1994	The Ealing, Hammersmith and Fulham, and Hounslow (London Borough Boundaries) Order 1993	Changes to the: Ealing/Hammersmith and Fulham (both Greater London) boundary; Ealing/Hounslow (both Greater London) boundary; Hounslow/Hammersmith and Fulham (both Greater London) boundary	Report No. 662: Ealing August 1992
1 April 1994	The Ealing, Hillingdon and Hounslow (London Borough Boundaries) Order 1993	Changes to the: Hillingdon/Ealing (both Greater London) boundary; Hillingdon/Hounslow (both Greater London) boundary	Report No. 676: Hillingdon September 1992
1 April 1994	The East London Boroughs (London Borough Boundaries) Order 1993	Changes to the: Barking and Dagenham/Havering (both Greater London) boundary; Barking and Dagenham/Newham (both Greater London) boundary; Barking and Dagenham/Redbridge (both Greater London) boundary	Report No. 660: Barking and Dagenham June 1992
1 April 1994	The East London Boroughs (London Borough Boundaries) (No. 2) Order 1993	Changes to the: Newham/Hackney (both Greater London) boundary; Newham/Redbridge (both Greater London) boundary; Newham/Tower Hamlets (both Greater London) boundary; Newham/Waltham Forest (both Greater London) boundary	Report No. 661: Newham June 1992
1 April 1994	The Essex and Greater London (County and London Borough Boundaries) Order 1993	Changes to the: Waltham Forest/Enfield (both Greater London) boundary; Waltham Forest/Hackney (both Greater London) boundary; Waltham Forest/Haringey (both Greater London) boundary; Waltham Forest (Greater London)/Epping Forest (Essex) boundary; Enfield (Greater London)/Epping Forest (Essex) boundary; Re-alignment to the modern course of the River Lea	Report No. 618: Waltham Forest February 1992
1 April 1994	The Essex and Greater London (County and London Borough Boundaries) (No.2) Order 1993	Changes to the: Havering/Barking and Dagenham (both Greater London) boundary; Havering (Greater London)/Brentwood (Essex) boundary; Havering (Greater London)/Epping Forest (Essex) boundary; Havering (Greater London)/Thurrock (Essex) boundary; Some alignment to the M25 motorway and transfer of part of Great Warley from Greater London †	Report No. 654: Havering June 1992
1 April 1994	The Essex, Greater London and Hertfordshire (County and London Borough Boundaries) Order 1993	Changes to the: Enfield/Barnet (both Greater London) boundary; Enfield (Greater London)/Broxbourne (Hertfordshire) boundary; Enfield (Greater London)/Hertsmere (Hertfordshire) boundary; Enfield (Greater London)/Welwyn Hatfield (Hertfordshire) boundary; Enfield (Greater London)/Epping Forest (Essex) boundary; Some alignment to the M25 motorway	Report No. 672: Enfield August 1992
1 April 1994	The Greater London and Surrey (County and London Borough Boundaries) Order 1993	Changes to the: Croydon/Bromley (both Greater London) boundary; Croydon (Greater London)/Reigate and Banstead (Surrey) boundary; Croydon (Greater London)/Tandridge (Surrey) boundary †	Report No. 615: Croydon (Bromley/Outer London) November 1991
1 April 1994	The Greater London and Surrey (County and London Borough Boundaries) (No. 2) Order 1993	Changes to the: Richmond upon Thames/Wandsworth (both Greater London) boundary; Richmond upon Thames (Greater London)/Spelthorne (Surrey) boundary †	Report No. 647: Richmond upon Thames May 1992
1 April 1994	The Greater London and Surrey (County and London Borough Boundaries) (No. 3) Order 1993	Changes to the: Sutton/Croydon (both Greater London) boundary; Sutton (Greater London)/Epsom and Ewell (Surrey) boundary; Sutton (Greater London)/Reigate and Banstead (Surrey) boundary; Croydon (Greater London)/Reigate and Banstead (Surrey) boundary	
1 April 1994	The Greater London and Surrey (County and London Borough Boundaries) (No. 4) Order 1993	Changes to the: Hounslow/Richmond upon Thames (both Greater London) boundary; Hounslow (Greater London)/Spelthorne (Surrey) boundary; Richmond upon Thames (Greater London)/Spelthorne (Surrey) boundary	Report No. 652: Hounslow August 1992
1 April 1994	The Greater London, Kent and Surrey (County Boundaries) Order 1993	Changes to the: Bexley (Greater London)/Sevenoaks (Kent) boundary; Bromley (Greater London)/Sevenoaks (Kent) boundary; Bromley (Greater London)/Tandridge (Surrey) boundary; Southern tip of Bromley at Tatsfield to Surrey †	Report No. 620: Bromley (Bexley/Outer London) February 1992
1 April 1994	The Greenwich and Lewisham (London Borough Boundaries) Order 1993	Changes to the Greenwich/Lewisham (both Greater London) boundary	Report No. 653: Lewisham June 1992
1 April 1994	The Hackney and Tower Hamlets (London Borough Boundaries) Order 1993	Changes to the Hackney/Tower Hamlets (both Greater London) boundary	Report No. 634: Tower Hamlets April 1992
1 April 1994	The Hackney, Haringey and Islington (London Borough Boundaries) Order 1993	Changes to the: Hackney/Haringey (both Greater London) boundary; Hackney/Islington (both Greater London) boundary	Report No. 663: Hackney July 1992
1 April 1994	The Haringey and Islington (London Borough Boundaries) Order 1993	Changes to the Haringey/Islington (both Greater London) boundary	Report No. 638: Islington April 1992
1 April 1994	The Heathrow Airport (County and London Borough Boundaries) Order 1993	Changes to the: Hillingdon/Hounslow (both Greater London) boundary; Hillingdon (Greater London)/Spelthorne (Surrey) boundary; Hillingdon (Greater London)/South Bucks (Buckinghamshire) boundary; Some alignment to the M25 motorway and Heathrow Airport brought entirely within Greater London †	Report No. 665: Heathrow July 1992
1 April 1994	The Kensington and Chelsea and Westminster (London Borough Boundaries) Order 1993	Changes to the Kensington and Chelsea/Westminster (both Greater London) boundary	Report No. 666: Westminster August 1992
1 April 1994	The Lambeth, Merton and Wandsworth (London Borough Boundaries) Order 1993	Changes to the: Wandsworth/Lambeth (both Greater London) boundary; Wandsworth/Merton (both Greater London) boundary; Merton/Lambeth (both Greater London)boundary	Report No. 669: Wandsworth August 1992
1 April 1994	The Lewisham and Southwark (London Borough Boundaries) Order 1993	Changes to the Lewisham/Southwark (both Greater London) boundary	Report No. 637: Southwark April 1992
1 April 1994	The North and Central London (London Borough Boundaries) Order 1993	Changes to the: Brent/Ealing (both Greater London) boundary; Brent/Harrow (both Greater London) boundary; Brent/Kensington and Chelsea (both Greater London) boundary; Brent/Westminster (both Greater London) boundary	Report No. 651: Brent May 1992; Report No. 687: Brent (Electoral Consequentials) October 1992
1 April 1994	The North London Boroughs (London Borough Boundaries) Order 1993	Changes to the: Haringey/Barnet (both Greater London) boundary; Haringey/Camden (both Greater London) boundary; Haringey/Enfield (both Greater London) boundary	
1 April 1995	The Berkshire, Buckinghamshire and Surrey (County Boundaries) Order 1994	Changes to the: Slough (Berkshire)/South Bucks (Buckinghamshire) boundary; Slough (Berkshire)/Spelthorne (Surrey) boundary; Giving Greater London and Berkshire a new common boundary	Report No. 558: Berkshire August 1988
1 April 1995	The Croydon, Merton and Sutton (London Borough Boundaries) Order 1993	Changes to the: Merton/Croydon (both Greater London) boundary; Merton/Sutton (both Greater London) boundary	
1 April 1995	The Essex and Greater London (County Boundaries) Order 1993	Changes to the Redbridge (Greater London)/Epping Forest (Essex) boundary Transfer of area around Grange Hill tube station to Greater London	Report No. 648: Redbridge May 1992
1 April 1995	The Greater London and Surrey (County and London Borough Boundaries) Order 1994	Changes to the: Kingston upon Thames/Richmond upon Thames (both Greater London) boundary; Kingston upon Thames/Sutton (both Greater London) boundary; Kingston upon Thames (Greater London)/Elmbridge (Surrey) boundary; Kingston upon Thames (Greater London)/Epsom and Ewell (Surrey) boundary; Kingston upon Thames (Greater London)/Mole Valley (Surrey) boundary; Sutton (Greater London)/Epsom and Ewell (Surrey) boundary †; (Some changes to the Metropolitan Police District were later repealed)	Report No. 667: Kingston August 1992
1 April 1995	The Redbridge and Waltham Forest (London Borough Boundaries) Order 1993	Changes to the Redbridge/Waltham Forest (both Greater London) boundary	Report No. 648: Redbridge May 1992
1 April 1996	The Kensington and Chelsea and Hammersmith and Fulham (London Borough Boundaries) Order 1995	Changes to the Kensington and Chelsea/Hammersmith and Fulham (both Greater London) boundary	Report No. 675: Kensington and Chelsea September 1992

† = also altered the boundaries of the Metropolitan Police District

Other mandatory meviews of non-metropolitan counties, metropolitan districts and London boroughs

- Report No. 627: The Boundaries of Greater London and the London Boroughs May 1992
Map showing the City of London boundaries pre & post-1994.

The table below summarises the overall changes in area and population.

Date	Area lost	Area gained	Net gain/loss	Pop. lost	Pop. gained	Net gain/loss
1 April 1993	385 hectares (3.85 km^{2})	85 hectares (0.85 km^{2})	−300 hectares (3.0 km^{2})	1,678	463	−1,215
1 April 1994	789.75 hectares (7.8975 km^{2})	665.17 hectares (6.6517 km^{2})	−124.58 hectares (1.2458 km^{2})	410	739	+329
1 April 1995	21.05 hectares (0.2105 km^{2})	93.5 hectares (0.935 km^{2})	+72.45 hectares (0.7245 km^{2})	138	1,058	+920
Total:	1,195.8 hectares (11.958 km^{2})	843.67 hectares (8.4367 km^{2})	−352.13 hectares (3.5213 km^{2})	2226	2260	+34

== Electoral boundaries ==
=== First periodic review ===
The Local Government Boundary Commission for England (or LGBCE) was established by the Local Government Act 1972 to review the electoral boundaries of every local authority in England. In 1973, there were early reviews of the electoral boundaries of Bexley and Kensington and Chelsea which needed minor boundaries redrawn in time for the 1974 local elections. In 1974, they began the first full electoral review of all metropolitan and non-metropolitan districts, completing it in July 1980. Their reviews of the county councils were completed in 1984.

Date	Statutory Instrument	LGBCE Report
2 May 1974	The London Borough of Lewisham (Wards) Order 1973	n/a (Renamed one existing ward)
2 May 1974	The Royal Borough of Kensington and Chelsea (Wards) Order 1973	Report No. 004: Kensington and Chelsea October 1973
2 May 1974	The London Borough of Bexley (Wards) Order 1974	Report No. 007: Bexley (Belvedere Ward) December 1973
4 May 1978	The London Borough of Barking (Electoral Arrangements) Order 1977	Report No. 185: Barking February 1977
4 May 1978	The London Borough of Barnet (Electoral Arrangements) Order 1977	Report No. 248: Barnet August 1977
4 May 1978	The London Borough of Bexley (Electoral Arrangements) Order 1977	Report No. 241: Bexley August 1977
4 May 1978	The London Borough of Brent (Electoral Arrangements) Order 1977	Report No. 226: Brent July 1977
4 May 1978	The London Borough of Bromley (Electoral Arrangements) Order 1977	Report No. 258: Bromley October 1977
4 May 1978	The London Borough of Camden (Electoral Arrangements) Order 1977	Report No. 230: Camden August 1977
4 May 1978	The London Borough of Croydon (Electoral Arrangements) Order 1977	Report No. 211: Croydon May 1977
4 May 1978	The London Borough of Ealing (Electoral Arrangements) Order 1977	Report No. 209: Ealing May 1977
4 May 1978	The London Borough of Greenwich (Electoral Arrangements) Order 1977	Report No. 234: Greenwich August 1977
4 May 1978	The London Borough of Hackney (Electoral Arrangements) Order 1977	Report No. 223: Hackney July 1977
4 May 1978	The London Borough of Hammersmith (Electoral Arrangements) Order 1977	Report No. 210: Hammersmith and Fulham May 1977
4 May 1978	The London Borough of Haringey (Electoral Arrangements) Order 1977	Report No. 254: Haringey September 1977
4 May 1978	The London Borough of Havering (Electoral Arrangements) Order 1977	Report No. 214: Havering May 1977
4 May 1978	The London Borough of Hillingdon (Electoral Arrangements) Order 1977	Report No. 217: Hillingdon June 1977
4 May 1978	The London Borough of Hounslow (Electoral Arrangements) Order 1977	Report No. 193: Hounslow April 1977
4 May 1978	The London Borough of Islington (Electoral Arrangements) Order 1977	Report No. 219: Islington June 1977
4 May 1978	The Royal Borough of Kensington and Chelsea (Electoral Arrangements) Order 1977	Report No. 207: Kensington and Chelsea May 1977
4 May 1978	The Royal Borough of Kingston upon Thames (Electoral Arrangements) Order 1977	Report No. 216: Kingston-upon-Thames May 1977
4 May 1978	The London Borough of Lambeth (Electoral Arrangements) Order 1977	Report No. 257: Lambeth October 1977
4 May 1978	The London Borough of Lewisham (Electoral Arrangements) Order 1977	Report No. 203: Lewisham April 1977
4 May 1978	The London Borough of Merton (Electoral Arrangements) Order 1977	Report No. 247: Merton August 1977
4 May 1978	The London Borough of Newham (Electoral Arrangements) Order 1977	Report No. 192: Newham April 1977
4 May 1978	The London Borough of Redbridge (Electoral Arrangements) Order 1977	Report No. 213: Redbridge May 1977
4 May 1978	The London Borough of Richmond upon Thames (Electoral Arrangements) Order 1977	Report No. 212: Richmond-upon-Thames May 1977
4 May 1978	The London Borough of Southwark (Electoral Arrangements) Order 1977	Report No. 205: Southwark April 1977
4 May 1978	The London Borough of Sutton (Electoral Arrangements) Order 1977	Report No. 194: Sutton March 1977
4 May 1978	The London Borough of Waltham Forest (Electoral Arrangements) Order 1977	Report No. 235: Waltham Forest August 1977
4 May 1978	The London Borough of Wandsworth (Electoral Arrangements) Order 1977	Report No. 249: Wandsworth September 1977
4 May 1978	The London Borough of Harrow (Electoral Arrangements) Order 1978	Report No. 256: Harrow October 1977
4 May 1978	The London Borough of Tower Hamlets (Electoral Arrangements) Order 1978	Report No. 244: Tower Hamlets August 1977
4 May 1978	The City of Westminster (Electoral Arrangements) Order 1978	Report No. 225: Westminster July 1977
6 May 1982	The London Borough of Enfield (Electoral Arrangements) Order 1980	Report No. 255: Enfield September 1977; Report No. 285: Enfield Judgement February 1978
	The Inner London Education Area (Electoral Arrangements) Order 1988	Report No. 533: ILEA (Electoral Arrangements) March 1987

=== Second periodic review ===
The Local Government Act 1992 established the Local Government Commission for England (or LGCE) as the successor to the LGBCE. In 1996, they began the second full electoral review of English local authorities. After the 1998 Greater London Authority referendum held on 7 May 1998 resulted in a yes vote, the LGCE drew the electoral boundaries for the new Greater London Authority and London Assembly. On 1 April 2002 the Boundary Committee for England (or BCfE) took over the functions of the LGBCE and carried on the review, completing it in 2004.

Date	Statutory Instrument	LGCE Report(s)
4 May 2000	Greater London Authority Act 1999	Draft report August 1998 Final report November 1998
2 May 2002	The London Borough of Barking and Dagenham (Electoral Changes) Order 2000	Draft report 23 March 1999 Final report 7 September 1999
2 May 2002	The London Borough of Barnet (Electoral Changes) Order 2000	Draft report 26 January 1999 Final report 22 June 1999
2 May 2002	The London Borough of Bexley (Electoral Changes) Order 2000	Draft report 2 March 1999 Final report 27 July 1999
2 May 2002	The London Borough of Brent (Electoral Changes) Order 2000	Draft report 3 August 1999 Final report 5 January 2000
2 May 2002	The London Borough of Bromley (Electoral Changes) Order 2000	Draft report 29 June 1999 Final report 30 November 1999
2 May 2002	The London Borough of Camden (Electoral Changes) Order 2000	Draft report 29 June 1999 Final report 30 November 1999
2 May 2002	The London Borough of Croydon (Electoral Changes) Order 2000	Draft report 23 March 1999 Final report 7 September 1999
2 May 2002	The London Borough of Ealing (Electoral Changes) Order 2000	Draft report 26 January 1999 Final report 22 June 1999
2 May 2002	The London Borough of Enfield (Electoral Changes) Order 2000	Draft report 3 August 1999 Final report 5 January 2000
2 May 2002	The London Borough of Greenwich (Electoral Changes) Order 2000	Draft report 3 August 1999 Final report 5 January 2000
2 May 2002	The London Borough of Hackney (Electoral Changes) Order 2000	Draft report 23 March 1999 Final report 7 September 1999
2 May 2002	The London Borough of Hammersmith and Fulham (Electoral Changes) Order 2000	Draft report 3 August 1999 Final report 5 January 2000
2 May 2002	The London Borough of Haringey (Electoral Changes) Order 2000	Draft report 23 March 1999 Final report 7 September 1999
2 May 2002	The London Borough of Harrow (Electoral Changes) Order 2000	Draft report 26 January 1999 Final report 22 June 1999
2 May 2002	The London Borough of Havering (Electoral Changes) Order 2000	Draft report 2 March 1999 Final report 27 July 1999
2 May 2002	The London Borough of Hillingdon (Electoral Changes) Order 2000	Draft report 29 June 1999 Final report 30 November 1999
2 May 2002	The London Borough of Hounslow (Electoral Changes) Order 2000	Draft report 26 January 1999 Final report 22 June 1999
2 May 2002	The London Borough of Islington (Electoral Changes) Order 2000	Draft report 23 March 1999 Final report 7 September 1999
2 May 2002	The Royal Borough of Kensington and Chelsea (Electoral Changes) Order 2000	Draft report 23 March 1999 Final report 7 September 1999
2 May 2002	The Royal Borough of Kingston upon Thames (Electoral Changes) Order 2000	Draft report 29 June 1999 Final report 30 November 1999
2 May 2002	The London Borough of Lambeth (Electoral Changes) Order 2000	Draft report 26 January 1999 Final report 22 June 1999
2 May 2002	The London Borough of Lewisham (Electoral Changes) Order 2000	Draft report 23 March 1999 Final report 7 September 1999
2 May 2002	The London Borough of Merton (Electoral Changes) Order 2000	Draft report 26 January 1999 Final report 22 June 1999
2 May 2002	The London Borough of Newham (Electoral Changes) Order 2000	Draft report 29 June 1999 Final report 30 November 1999
2 May 2002	The London Borough of Redbridge (Electoral Changes) Order 2000	Draft report 26 January 1999 Final report 22 June 1999
2 May 2002	The London Borough of Richmond upon Thames (Electoral Changes) Order 2000	Draft report 2 March 1999 Final report 27 July 1999
2 May 2002	The London Borough of Southwark (Electoral Changes) Order 2000	Draft report 23 March 1999 Final report 7 September 1999
2 May 2002	The London Borough of Sutton (Electoral Changes) Order 2000	Draft report 29 June 1999 Final report 5 January 2000
2 May 2002	The London Borough of Tower Hamlets (Electoral Changes) Order 2000	Draft report 23 March 1999 Final report 7 September 1999
2 May 2002	The London Borough of Waltham Forest (Electoral Changes) Order 2000	Draft report 26 January 1999 Final report 22 June 1999
2 May 2002	The London Borough of Wandsworth (Electoral Changes) Order 2000	Draft report 2 March 1999 Final report 27 July 1999
2 May 2002	The City of Westminster (Electoral Changes) Order 2000	Draft report 23 March 1999 Final report 7 September 1999

=== Further electoral reviews by the LGBCE ===
The Local Government Boundary Commission for England (or LGBCE) was established by the Local Democracy, Economic Development and Construction Act 2009 on 1 April 2010 as the successor to the BCfE. It continues to review the electoral arrangements of English local authorities on an ‘as and when’ basis.

Date	Statutory Instrument	LGBCE Report(s)
22 May 2014	The Hackney (Electoral Changes) Order 2013	Final report January 2013
22 May 2014	The Kensington and Chelsea (Electoral Changes) Order 2014	Final report September 2013
22 May 2014	The Tower Hamlets (Electoral Changes) Order 2013	Final report March 2013
3 May 2018	The Bexley (Electoral Changes) Order 2017	Final report November 2016
3 May 2018	The Croydon (Electoral Changes) Order 2017	Final report July 2017
3 May 2018	The Redbridge (Electoral Changes) Order 2017	Final report November 2016
3 May 2018	The Southwark (Electoral Changes) Order 2016	Final report July 2016
5 May 2022	The Barking and Dagenham (Electoral Changes) Order 2021	Final report August 2021
5 May 2022	The Barnet (Electoral Changes) Order 2020	Final report January 2020
5 May 2022	The Brent (Electoral Changes) Order 2020	Final report July 2019
5 May 2022	The Bromley (Electoral Changes) Order 2021	Final report November 2020
5 May 2022	The Camden (Electoral Changes) Order 2020	Final report February 2020
5 May 2022	The Ealing (Electoral Changes) Order 2020	Final report July 2019
5 May 2022	The Enfield (Electoral Changes) Order 2020	Final report March 2020
5 May 2022	The Greenwich (Electoral Changes) Order 2021	Final report August 2021
5 May 2022	The Hammersmith and Fulham (Electoral Changes) Order 2020	Final report June 2020
5 May 2022	The Haringey (Electoral Changes) Order 2020	Final report December 2019
5 May 2022	The Harrow (Electoral Changes) Order 2020	Final report May 2019
5 May 2022	The Havering (Electoral Changes) Order 2021	Final report May 2021
5 May 2022	The Hillingdon (Electoral Changes) Order 2020	Final report June 2019
5 May 2022	The Hounslow (Electoral Changes) Order 2020	Final report October 2019
5 May 2022	The Islington (Electoral Changes) Order 2020	Final report January 2020
5 May 2022	The Kingston upon Thames (Electoral Changes) Order 2021	Final report November 2020
5 May 2022	The Lambeth (Electoral Changes) Order 2022	Final report September 2021
5 May 2022	The Lewisham (Electoral Changes) Order 2020	Final report June 2020
5 May 2022	The Merton (Electoral Changes) Order 2020	Final report October 2020
5 May 2022	The Newham (Electoral Changes) Order 2021	Final report November 2020
5 May 2022	The Richmond upon Thames (Electoral Changes) Order 2020	Final report May 2020
5 May 2022	The Sutton (Electoral Changes) Order 2020	Final report June 2020
5 May 2022	The Waltham Forest (Electoral Changes) Order 2021	Final report December 2020
5 May 2022	The Wandsworth (Electoral Changes) Order 2021	Final report November 2020
5 May 2022	The Westminster (Electoral Changes) Order 2020	Final report May 2020

== Proposed changes ==
=== Expansion ===
In 2004, following a poll, a move was mooted by the London Assembly to entirely align the Greater London boundary to the M25 motorway. In 2005, then Mayor of London, Ken Livingstone, suggested that the neighbouring areas of Dartford, Thurrock and Watford could be given the opportunity to vote on joining Greater London in local referendums. When asked about a possible expansion to include Epsom in Surrey, Livingstone said he would be "happy to take large chunks of Surrey as well". In 2007, Livingstone said that there was "a real case for London's boundary being extended along the Thames estuary, [...] they're all Londoners anyhow, no more than a generation removed". He said that the absorption of Dartford and Thurrock in the Thames Gateway would support the regeneration of these areas and provide benefits to their residents, such as Greater London's free bus travel for under-18s. He held meetings with government ministers to discuss the proposal, but no referendums would ever be held.

In 2010, it was reported that an extension of the boundary to include Elmbridge was being considered by Livingstone's successor Boris Johnson. A spokesperson for Johnson said that there were no plans to expand the boundary into Elmbridge or other areas. In 2015, it was proposed that a new borough be created by reclaiming land to form an archipelago in the River Thames to deal with the housing crisis in the city.

Slough Borough Council proposed joining Greater London amid reforms to local government and devolution in February 2025. Sadiq Khan indicated he was open to such an endeavour the following month. In June 2025, the former Slough mayor Mewa S. Mann called for the proposal to go ahead, and discussed possible economic benefits. In August 2025, Slough's Labour MP Tan Dhesi said he was discussing the proposal with local stakeholders in London and Berkshire and pushing for a consultation on the move, stating that he was "seriously" considering the matter and pointing to the borough's close cultural links with London.

=== Reduction ===
Several proposals have been made for Greater London's boundaries to revert to London's pre-1965 borders. Supporters of this idea argue that Greater London is too big, with the outer London boroughs remaining culturally, geographically and ethnically distinct from inner London and maintaining closer links to their historic counties than London. Local opponents of Greater London policies like the Ultra Low Emission Zone (ULEZ) also feel that their concerns are ignored by the Greater London Authority, which they see as dominated by inner London. It is argued that by re-joining their former counties, the outer boroughs may see benefits such as stronger civic pride and a greater sense of belonging, as well as a greater say and influence in local governance.

In 2023, residents in the London boroughs of Bromley and Bexley organised a petition for their boroughs to leave Greater London and re-join Kent, in response to the expansion of the ULEZ to London's outer boroughs. The petition was organised after the residents said they felt the Greater London Authority was "ignoring the community of the outer boroughs", with the organisers arguing that it would be better for Bromley and Bexley to re-join Kent because of a lack of transport connections to the rest of the capital.

In 2017, Havering London Borough Council voted on a motion for the borough to negotiate with the Greater London Authority to leave Greater London, become an independent unitary authority and possibly re-join Essex, a proposal known as "Hexit". Supporters argued that the residents of Havering felt a stronger affinity to its historic county of Essex rather than London, and that such a move would enable the borough to "take back control" from Greater London and make its own independent decisions on issues such as planning. The motion was voted down by the council, but the idea regained traction with the expansion of the ULEZ in 2023 and the changes to local government from 2024. Local newspaper The Havering Daily ran a poll in May 2025 which purported to show that 68% of over 1,500 residents from the borough supported such a move. Andrew Rosindell, the Conservative MP for Romford, launched a campaign for Havering to leave Greater London and join the new Greater Essex Combined County Authority in 2025. James McMurdock, the Reform UK MP for the Essex constituency of South Basildon and East Thurrock, endorsed the proposal.
