= Esher Sixth Form College =

Location
- Weston Green Road; Thames Ditton, Surrey, KT7 0JB; England; 51°23′16″N 0°20′34″W

Information
- Type: 16-19 Academy
- Established: 1974
- Department for Education URN: 145006 Tables
- Ofsted: Reports
- Principal: Dan Hards
- Gender: Mixed
- Age: 16 to 18
- Enrolment: 2100 (approx.)
- Former name: Esher College
- Previous URN: 130830
- Former name: Esher County Grammar School
- Website: https://www.esher.ac.uk

Esher Sixth Form College is an open access, non-selective 16-19 Academy located in Thames Ditton, Surrey, England.

Rated as "outstanding" in September 2022 by Ofsted, it now has around 2100 students enrolled, with a catchment drawn from north Surrey and southwest London. They offer over 40 A Level and BTEC National courses, with the opportunity to combine both.

== Location ==
Esher Sixth Form College is very close to Thames Ditton railway station on the northern edge of Surrey. It is situated just south of the roundabout of the A309 and B364.

== History ==
=== Grammar school ===
The site was formerly Esher County Grammar School which moved there in 1965, having been established as Surbiton County Grammar in the 1920s. The original Surbiton site is now occupied by the Hollyfield School.

=== Sixth form college ===
The transformation into a sixth form college began in 1974 with the last intake of grammar school pupils. It became a wholly sixth form college in 1979, by which time it was known as Esher College and had approximately 1000 students. It has since expanded, and the 2021 prospectus describes the college as 'a community of over 1900 full-time students'.

=== 16-19 Academy ===
It became a 16-19 Academy in September 2019 and changed its name to 'Esher Sixth Form College'

== Former pupils ==
- India de Beaufort, actress
- Finn Cole, actor
- Josh Franceschi, (You Me at Six lead singer)
- Mike Galsworthy, science researcher and pro-EU advocate
- Camilla Kerslake, singer
- Keira Knightley, actress
- Ray Lewington, Watford F.C. assistant manager
- Rhea Norwood, actor
- Jamie T, musician
- Ruth Wilson, actress
