= 1882 in the United Kingdom =

Events from the year 1882 in the United Kingdom.

== Incumbents ==
- Monarch – Victoria
- Prime Minister – William Ewart Gladstone (Liberal)

== Events ==
- 12 January – Holborn Viaduct power station in the City of London, the world's first coal-fired public electricity generating station, begins operation, supplying street lighting and some premises.
- 25 January – London Chamber of Commerce founded.
- 16 February – Trimdon Grange colliery disaster: an underground explosion in the Durham Coalfield kills 69.
- 2 March – Roderick Maclean fails in an attempt to assassinate Queen Victoria outside Windsor railway station, the last attempt on her life.
- 24 March – Jumbo the elephant departs from Britain having been sold by London Zoo to the American showman P. T. Barnum for $10,000.
- 25 March – Old Etonians F.C. beat Blackburn Rovers 1–0 in the FA Cup Final at The Oval, the last time an amateur team will win.
- May – Burnley F.C. changes codes from Rugby union to Association football.
- 2 May – 'Kilmainham Treaty', an agreement between the British government and the gaoled Irish nationalist leader Charles Stewart Parnell extending the terms of the Land Law (Ireland) Act 1881 to abate tenant rent arrears, is announced.
- 6 May – Phoenix Park Murders in Ireland: Lord Frederick Cavendish, the newly appointed Chief Secretary for Ireland, and Thomas Henry Burke, his Permanent Undersecretary, are fatally stabbed in Phoenix Park, Dublin, by members of the "Irish National Invincibles" (militant Irish republicans).
- 18 May – the fourth Eddystone Lighthouse is illuminated for the first time; its designer, James Douglass, is knighted the following month.
- 3 July – Interments (felo de se) Act 1882 permits the normal burial of a felo de se suicide.
- 11–13 July – Anglo-Egyptian War: The British Mediterranean Fleet carries out the Bombardment of Alexandria, its forces capturing the city of Alexandria in Egypt and securing the Suez Canal.
- 10 August – Settled Land Act facilitates the sale of landed estates.
- 15 August – Married Women's Property Act enables wives to buy, own and sell property and to keep their own earnings, with effect from 1883.
- 29 August – the England cricket team is beaten for the first time in a home Test cricket match by Australia at The Oval (by 7 runs). The 2 September issue of The Sporting Times first refers to "The Ashes".
- 5 September – Tottenham Hotspur F.C. founded as Hotspur F.C. by London schoolboys.
- 13 September – Anglo-Egyptian War: British troops occupy Cairo and Egypt becomes British protectorate.
- 25 September – Young Men's Christian Institute, the former Royal Polytechnic Institute (Britain's first polytechnic) and a predecessor of the University of Westminster, opens in new premises in Regent Street, London, provided by Quintin Hogg.
- 28 October – six Benedictine monks return from France to commence the rebuilding of Buckfast Abbey in Devon, largely destroyed during the Dissolution of the Monasteries.
- 25 November – the Gilbert and Sullivan comic opera Iolanthe is first produced, at the Savoy Theatre in London.
- 4 December – Queen Victoria opens the Royal Courts of Justice in London.
- 28 December – Newlands Mill chimney in Bradford collapses causing the loss of 54 lives, mostly young girls and boys.

=== Undated ===
- "Mundella Code" promotes 'enlightened' teaching in public elementary schools.
- Battle of the Braes on the Scottish island of Skye: Protests by crofting tenants facing eviction; police from Glasgow and the military are sent to restore order.
- The county town of Lancashire is transferred from Lancaster to Preston, where a new County Hall is opened.
- The Chartered Institute of Patent Agents is founded (later becoming the Chartered Institute of Patent Attorneys).
- The Society for Psychical Research is founded by Henry Sidgwick.
- Lager is brewed at Wrexham, for the first time in the UK.
- Walter Langley moves to Newlyn, Cornwall, becoming the first resident artist of the Newlyn School.
- Founding of the following sports clubs:
  - Albion Rovers F.C. (through the amalgamation of two Coatbridge clubs, Albion and Rovers) in industrial west Scotland.
  - Christchurch Rangers, the earliest predecessor of Queens Park Rangers F.C., in London.
  - Glentoran F.C. in Belfast.
  - Thames Ditton Lawn Tennis Club, the oldest lawn tennis club still on its original site, in Surrey.
  - Waterloo F.C., a rugby union club, as Serpentine on Merseyside.

== Publications ==
- F. Anstey's novel Vice Versa.
- Richard Jefferies' children's story Bevis.

== Births ==
- 5 January – Dorothy Levitt, born Elizabeth Levi, racing driver (died 1922)
- 18 January – A. A. Milne, author (died 1956)
- 25 January – Virginia Woolf, novelist (suicide 1941)
- 2 February – James Joyce, Irish-born novelist (died 1941 in Switzerland)
- 22 February – Eric Gill, sculptor and writer (died 1940)
- 5 March – Dora Marsden, radical feminist and modernist literary editor (died 1960)
- 18 April – Leopold Stokowski, orchestral conductor (died 1977)
- 24 April – Hugh Dowding, Scottish-born Air Chief Marshal (died 1970)
- 5 May – Sylvia Pankhurst, suffragette (died 1960)
- 30 May – Wyndham Halswelle, runner (died 1915)
- 10 June – Nevile Henderson, diplomat (died 1942)
- 12 June – Joe Walton, footballer (died 1954)
- 8 July – John Anderson, civil servant and politician (died 1958)
- 17 July – James Somerville, admiral (died 1949)
- 27 July
  - Donald Crisp, actor, film director, screenwriter and producer (died 1974 in the United States)
  - Geoffrey de Havilland, aircraft designer (died 1965)
- 14 August – Gisela Richter, art historian (died 1972)
- 11 September – James Chuter Ede, Labour politician, Home Secretary (died 1965)
- 16 September – Robert Hichens, RMS Titanic quartermaster (died 1940)
- 19 September – Christopher Stone, first disc jockey in the U.K. (died 1965)
- 29 September – Lilias Armstrong, phonetician (died 1937)
- 14 October – Charlie Parker, cricketer (died 1959)
- 24 October – Sybil Thorndike, stage actress (died 1976)
- 25 October – Florence Easton, operatic soprano (died 1955)
- 3 November – G. H. Elliott, blackface music hall singer (died 1962)
- 21 November – Harold Lowe, Welsh 5th Officer of RMS Titanic (died 1944)
- 9 December – Percy C. Mather, Protestant missionary (died 1933 in China)
- 12 December – Edward Maufe, architect (died 1974)
- 16 December – Jack Hobbs, cricketer (died 1963)
- 27 December – Noel Laurence, admiral (died 1970)
- 28 December – Arthur Stanley Eddington, astrophysicist (died 1944)

== Deaths ==
- 20 January – John Linnell, painter (born 1792)
- 27 January – Sir Robert Christison, Scottish physician and toxicologist (born 1797)
- 8 March – William Bulkeley Hughes, Welsh politician (born 1797)
- 9 April – Dante Gabriel Rossetti, poet and painter (born 1828)
- 17 April – George Jennings, sanitary engineer (born 1801)
- 18 April – Sir Henry Cole, civil servant and inventor (born 1808)
- 19 April – Charles Darwin, naturalist (born 1809)
- 23 April – William Brighty Rands, writer, author of nursery rhymes (born 1823)
- 29 April – John Nelson Darby, evangelist (born 1800)
- 27 May – Edwin Abbott, educator (born 1808)
- 3 June – James Thomson ("B.V."), Scottish-born poet (born 1834)
- 8 June – John Scott Russell, Scottish-born shipbuilder (born 1808)
- 3 July – Benjamin Nottingham Webster, actor-manager and dramatist (born 1797)
- 13 August – William Stanley Jevons, economist (born 1835)
- 16 August – Sir Woodbine Parish, diplomat (born 1796)
- 24 August – John Dillwyn Llewelyn, botanist and photographer (born 1810)
- 16 September – Edward Bouverie Pusey, theologian (born 1800)
- 6 October – John Cobbold, brewer, railway developer and politician (born 1797)
- 3 December – Archibald Campbell Tait, Archbishop of Canterbury (born 1811)
- 6 December – Anthony Trollope, novelist and postal service official (born 1815)
- 18 December – Francis Close, Anglican priest, rector of Cheltenham and Dean of Carlisle (born 1797)
