= Surbiton County Grammar School =

- Surbiton and subsequently Thames Ditton, Surrey/London; England

Information
- Type: Grammar school
- Established: 1920s
- Closed: 1979 (site became a wholly sixth form college)
- Age: 11 to 18
- Houses: Day Houses: 4
- Former pupils: Old Surbitonians
- Destiny: Original site became Hollyfield School, subsequent site became Esher College

Surbiton County Grammar was a school in Surbiton on the borders of London and Surrey. Established in the 1920s, the school later moved to Thames Ditton and changed its name to Esher County Grammar School. The last grammar school pupils were admitted in 1974, and by 1979 the site had become a sixth form college. The school was attended by boys from the whole of north Surrey.

== History ==
=== Surbiton ===
The school was established in the mid-1920s. Until 1965 it was located on Surbiton Hill Road in Surbiton. The three main buildings were large Victorian mansions called Braemar (where pupils began their school lives), Aysgarth and Albury (School) houses together with their grounds and outbuildings. A stables block once housed a sixth form classroom. In the early sixties Aysgarth and Braemar were demolished and replaced by purpose-built units. It was known for its rugby, chess and bridge teams.

=== Thames Ditton ===
A new Headmaster, Eric Waller, took over in September 1965, ahead of the move to new premises in Weston Green Road Thames Ditton in the spring of 1966. Boys in all forms throughout the school assisted with the move, packing crates at the Surbiton site and unpacking crates at Thames Ditton, which took about a week. The form registers had to be "adjusted" to show attendance as if school had been running normally. The school at its new location was later renamed as Esher County Grammar.

The school had always admitted boys into its sixth form from other local schools which did not have their own sixth form, and the long-term plan was to evolve the school into a sixth form college. The first major change was in September 1971 when the school started admitting girls into the lower sixth. From September 1974 the external sixth form intake was increased and the final entry of grammar school pupils took place, so that from September 1979 it became a wholly sixth form college. From around 1977, the name had changed again to Esher College, which still exists on the same Thames Ditton site.

The old site on Surbiton Hill is now used by Hollyfield School.

=== Day Houses ===
All boys were members of one of four day houses which were named after dignitaries in some way associated with Surbiton.:

House	Founded	Colours	Named After
Coutts		Red	
Egmont		Green	
Lovelace		Purple	
Villiers		Light Blue	

== Heads ==
- AGF Willis – 16th Sep 1925 to Dec 1952
- A.J. Doig – Jan 1953 to Jul 1965
- Eric W.A. Waller – Sep 1965 to early 1980s
- Patrick F Miller – early 1980s to mid 1990s

== Alumni ==
- Tony Arbour, Conservative member of the GLA for South West and transport spokesman, and Leader of Richmond Council from 2002 to 2006
- Michael Basman, chess player
- John Cooper (car maker), car maker and racing driver
- Felix Dennis, publisher
- Rt Rev Anthony Charles Dumper, Bishop of Dudley from 1977 to 1993
- Peter Heaton-Jones, former Member of Parliament and broadcaster (Esher County Grammar)
- Prof Brian Juden, professor of French 1970–1985 at Royal Holloway, University of London
- David Lock, former Member of Parliament (Esher County Grammar)
- Maj-Gen Rowley Mans CBE
- Martin Parr, photographer
- Dave Pearce, DJ and music producer (Esher County Grammar)
- Graham Pirnie, Ambassador to Paraguay from 1995 to 1998
- Prof Peter Pulzer, Gladstone Professor of Government and Public Administration from 1985–96 to University of Oxford
- Douglas Reeman, novelist (writing as Alexander Kent)
- Rear Adm Hugh Rickard CBE, Chief Executive from 2004 to 2006 of the Royal Anniversary Trust
- Andrew Stunell, Former Lib Dem MP and now a member of the House of Lords
- Ed Whitlock, marathon runner, age group record holder
- David Wright OBE, Ambassador to Qatar from 1997 to 2002
- Derek Yalden, Zoologist

== Old Surbitonians RFC - Cobham Rugby Football Club ==
The club was formed in 1930 as Old Surbitonians RFC by the first group of school leavers from Surbiton County Grammar School for Boys. In 1949, as a memorial to those Old Boys who perished in the Second World War, the grounds at Fairmile Lane, Cobham, were purchased. After the school moved from its original site in Surbiton to Esher as a boys' grammar school, The Braemar Club was created to honour the old school building. The change of name of the school to Esher County Grammar School and more prominently the evolution of the old school into a mixed sixth form college had a significant and detrimental impact on the flow of young players into the club, which was one of the driving forces behind the club being one of the first in the country to set up a Mini Rugby section, in the Golden Jubilee year of 1980. Mini Rugby spawned a sizeable and flourishing Youth section, which has produced national Champions at various levels. The club was placed in the new 1st division of the new Surrey Leagues when the RFU introduced League Rugby in 1987. Prior to this, the club had enjoyed much success, including a famous unbeaten season of 1963–64, and a Surrey Cup Final appearance in 1976. The club changed its name in 1989 to Cobham Rugby Football Club, to both identify more closely with the immediate surrounding area, and to signify the change to an open membership club. Recent years have seen the clubs' steady progress through the leagues, with four promotions in six seasons in the Leagues since 1987, and success elsewhere in winning the Surrey Shield in 1999. The 1sts now play in London South Division 2 following successive promotions under the stewardship of Head Coach, Billy Davison. Despite its name change, it still recognises its heritage and association with the old school.
