= Giggs Hill Green =

Park in Thames Ditton, Surrey, England

Coordinates: 51.386°N 0.333°W

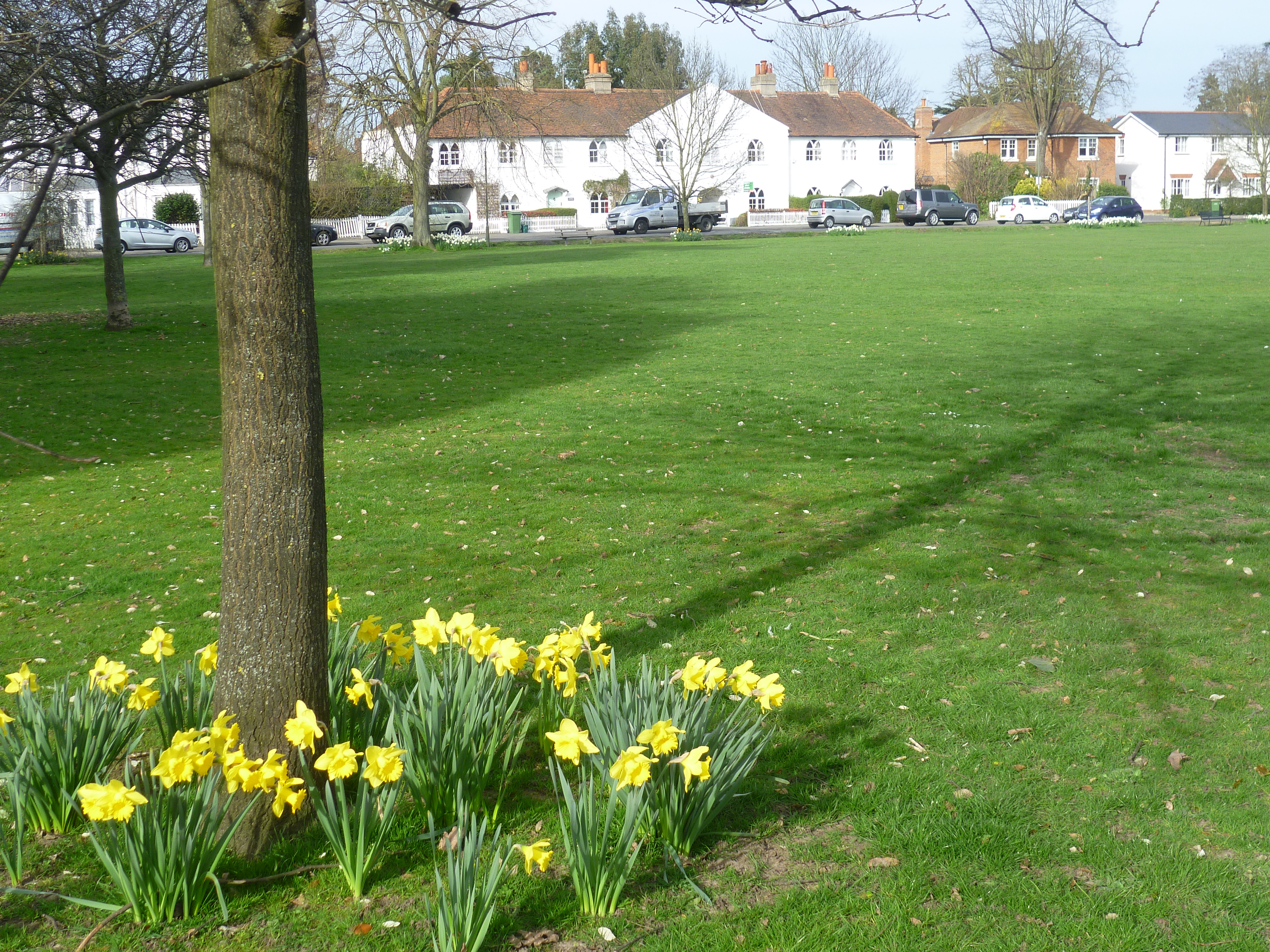
Daffodils on Giggs Hill Green

Giggs Hill Green is a triangular park in Thames Ditton bordered on one side by the Portsmouth Road. A major portion of it has, since 1833, contained the village's cricket green.

Previously part of the manorial waste (unproductive land) with a high subsoil of clay, gravel and flint belonging to the manor of Kingston, the 8 acres (32,000 m^{2}) of Giggs Hill Green were purchased in 1901 for £250 (equivalent to £26,567 in 2025) by Esher and Dittons Urban District Council.

Giggs Hill Green (Panoramic view)

== Etymology ==
The mystery of Giggs Hill Green is that there is no hill. The Green has had several different spellings over the centuries. In the 15th and 16th centuries, it was known as 'Le Gighill', 'Gyghyll', the 'lane called Gyghill' and 'Giggehill'. In Middle English, 'gigge' means a whirling thing, so perhaps a maypole was implied.

== Highwaymen ==
Horace Walpole, resident in Twickenham, wrote of the dangers of the Portsmouth Road in 1784: "But here is a worse calamity; one is never safe by day or night: Mrs Walsingham, who has bought your brother's late house at Ditton, was robbed a few days ago in the high road, within a mile of home, at seven in the evening." By 'Mrs Walsingham', Walpole was referring to the mother of Hon. Charlotte Boyle Walsingham who constructed her mansion farmhouse, Boyle Farm, which has been turned into The Home of Compassion at the far end of the village centre by the Thames.

Portsmouth Road and the surrounding commons were notoriously dangerous. There was the serious risk of both footpads (i.e. unmounted robbers) and highwaymen. Tom Waters, Jerry Abershawe, Evan Evans, William Hawke and Thomas Banks were all hanged in the 17th/18th centuries for banditry on the Portsmouth Road.

== History of cricket on the green ==
William IV was on the throne when the first recorded cricket match took place on Giggs Hill Green. The year was 1833, and a Ditton side played against the gentleman of Richmond and Brentford. The result was never recorded nor the names of the players who took part, but the beer was only two pence a pint. At this time the club operated from the local inn, 'The Angel', which still overlooks the Green.

The club prospered and by 1877 began to look to travel further afield in search of opponents. A coach and horses was hired to take a team to play Englefield Green with an entertainer on board for the journey. Cash was in short supply, one match was brought to an abrupt end when the ball was hit under the front of a passing steamroller.

Having had his window broken by the ball, the owner of Dorset Lodge, which also overlooks the Green, offered the Club one pound for every ball hit there from that moment on.

Between 1879 and 1920 a number of Surrey and England players learnt their cricket on the Green. A week of matches never failed to attract the attention of the village. Despite the limited changing facilities at 'The Angel', the club prospered, with a team of principally local players. Many of the Surrey County players have held a benefit match on the green against the local side. Two local roads are named after Thames Ditton, Surrey and England cricketers: Maurice Read and Tom Hayward.

The club was one of the few to carry on during WWIi due in large measure to its sheer continuity, and going strongly again in 1946. In more recent times, with the generous help of the Milk Marketing Board a new pavilion was built in 1977 (and rebuilt in 2004). The club thrives to the present day.

=== Cricket clubs ===
On its cricket green four teams play every Saturday in the Surrey County Leagues and two on Sunday. A cricket week is still held every year and for the last two years the club has toured the West Country.

On Sunday mornings the Colts from 9 to 16 years of age play matches against neighbouring clubs.
