= Brian Juden =

Professor Brian Juden M.A. D.èsL. (14 February 1920 – 31 July 2008) was Professor of French and Head of the Department at Royal Holloway College, which is now known as Royal Holloway, part of the University of London, from 1970 to 1985. He was one of the leading authorities on the links between French literary creativity and political, religious and aesthetic thought.

== Biography ==
Brian Valentine Juden was born on 14 February 1920 in New Malden, Surrey. His father was Charles Henry Juden (1883–1969), a civil servant in the Post Office, and his mother was Elizabeth (Lilly) Sarah Maria Juden née Shillingford (1884–1956). His older brother was Eric Charles Juden, who was born in 1911.

Juden attended Surbiton County School from 1930 to 1936, and Wimbledon Technical College from 1936 to 1937, where he studied Motor Car Technical Drawing and Calculations, and Motor Car Mechanics. He then started work as a motor engineer.

In the Second World War Juden served in the Royal Artillery and the Royal Army Medical Corps. It was in the tunnels under Dover Castle that he used his mathematics skills for gun-aiming work, but the poor conditions in the tunnels gave him respiratory problems. For these he was admitted as a patient to Smallfield Hospital near Redhill. This was staffed by the Royal Army Medical Corps, to which he subsequently transferred.

After the war, Juden attended the Victoria University of Manchester, reading French from 1945 to 1948 for a Bachelor of Arts degree, and studying education from 1948 to 1949 for a Teacher's Diploma. He was awarded a scholarship by the French Government to study at the Sorbonne from 1949 to 1953. One of his first works there was his thesis on "l'Oeuvre lyrique de Gérard de Nerval", written under Eugène Vinaver's supervision, and for which he was awarded in 1951 the Degree of Master of Arts by the Victoria University of Manchester.

In 1954 Juden was appointed assistant lecturer at the University of Sheffield, where he taught French language and French 19th century literature, and supervised the French lecteurs and lectrices.

When Juden was staying in the English halls of the Cité Internationale Universitaire de Paris, he met Marie-Josèphe Christiane Tortat, who was staying in the American halls and studying English. She was born on 5 June 1925 in Beton-Bazoches, which is about forty miles to the east of Paris, the daughter of Marie Joseph Georges Tortat, known as Georges, and Berthe Marie Henriette Tortat née Pouron. Juden and Marie-Josèphe married on 29 October 1955 in the Holy Cross Church in West Barnes, in south-west London. He shortened the name Marie-Josèphe Christiane to Josette, and they made their first home in Sheffield. Josette taught French to A level students at the girls' High School. He was promoted from assistant lecturer to lecturer.

While he was working at the University of Sheffield, Juden wrote, under the supervision of Pierre Moreau and Pierre-Georges Castex, two theses for the award of his Doctorat d'État ès Lettres et Sciences Humaines: the major thesis was "Traditions Orphiques et Tendances Mystiques dans le Romantisme Français, 1800–1855" and the secondary thesis was "La France Littéraire de Charles Malo (1832–1839) et de Pierre Joseph Challamel (1840–1843)". The Doctorat d'État ès Lettres et Sciences Humaines was awarded by the Université de Paris-Sorbonne in 1971. The Doctorat d'État ès Lettres is equivalent to a Ph.D.

In 1970 Juden was appointed to the University of London Chair of French at Royal Holloway College, which is now known as Royal Holloway. He was Professor of French and Head of the department. He and Josette moved home first to Guildford, Surrey and then in 1971 to Ascot, Berkshire.

When Juden retired in 1985, a volume of essays on "Ideology and Religion in French Literature" was published in his honour. More than twenty scholars from nine nations contributed the essays to the volume, which demonstrated the depth and geographical extent of the esteem in which Juden was held, as a scholar and as a man.

Juden died in Ascot, Berkshire on 31 July 2008. Josette died in Ascot, Berkshire on 30 November 2014. They had no children.
