= Thames Ditton Lawn Tennis Club =

Coordinates: 51.389°N 0.342°W

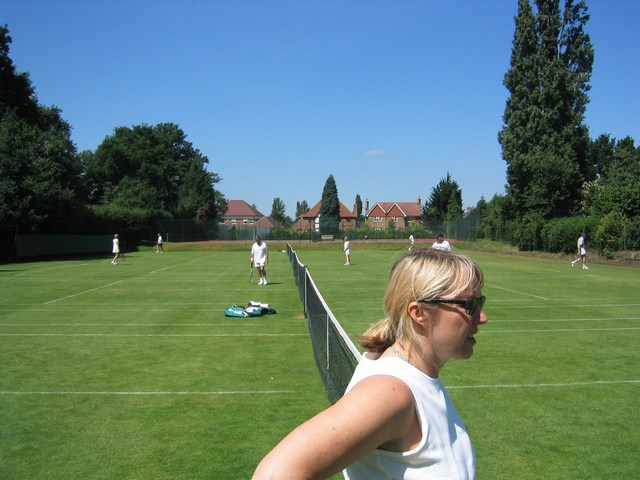
The six grass courts of Thames Ditton.

The Thames Ditton Lawn Tennis Club is a lawn tennis club in Thames Ditton, Surrey, England.

It was established in 1882, nine years after the official rules of lawn tennis were laid down. It is the oldest lawn tennis club still on its original site. Long after most clubs have replaced grass with various types of all-weather surface, Thames Ditton retains six outstanding grass courts and four newly installed artificial clay courts.

== Legal history ==
In the late 1990s, as the lease of the land on which the Club plays came to an end, the survival of the TDLTC came under threat. The owner of the freehold wanted to sell the site to a residential developer. A question was raised in the House of Commons about the vulnerability of sports clubs to greedy developers: Hansard. The case entered the legal textbooks as Coppin v Bruce-Smith (1998) EGCS 55 (CA). Briefly:

In Coppin-Smith, the premises comprised Thames Ditton Lawn Tennis Club, which included ten tennis courts and a pavilion, together covering over 2 acres (8,100 m^{2}). The tenants, the trustees of the club, served a s26 request on the landlord, who served a counter-notice stating that he would resist a new lease on ground. Before the hearing, the landlord applied for planning permission for the site, which was refused on the ground of the loss of a recreational open space. The landlord then decided to demolish the buildings and courts on the basis that this would make it easier in the future to obtain planning consent.

At the hearing, the Court of Appeal had to consider whether the landlord had established a 'reasonable prospect' of success (using the test in Cadogan). The landlord's expert gave evidence that the proposed demolition could be carried out without planning permission. The Court of Appeal considered whether this was correct in the light of the 1995 direction that planning consent for demolition is required only for dwelling houses. It decided that, contrary to the landlord's expert's view, planning permission would be required as the works were more aptly described as engineering works than demolition works. It was agreed that the landlord would encounter the same objection as previously when applying for planning permission. Accordingly, it held that the landlord could not show the necessary firm and settled intention to demolish the premises and was unable to resist the tenant's application for a new lease.

== The club today ==
- Olly Johnson (Chairman)
- Steve Aukett (Secretary)
- Luke Steel (Bar Secretary)

== Location ==
Weston Green Road, Thames Ditton, Surrey, England.
