= Hollyfield School =

The Hollyfield School

Location
- Surbiton Hill Road; Surbiton, KT6 4TU; England
- 51°23′48″N 0°17′56″W

Information
- Type: Academy
- Motto: 'Scientia Aeterna Est' (Knowledge is Eternal)
- Established: 1937; 89 years ago
- Department for Education URN: 137678 Tables
- Ofsted: Reports
- Chair: Michael Morton
- Head teacher: Amy Jackson
- Gender: Co-Educational
- Age: 11 to 18
- Enrolment: 1,120
- Houses: Eagle, Falcon, Osprey
- Website: www.hollyfield.kingston.sch.uk

Hollyfield School is a co-educational academy school located in Surbiton, in the Royal Borough of Kingston upon Thames, London, England. There are approximately 1,120 students on roll, with 220 in the sixth form.

== History ==
Established in 1937 as Surbiton Central School, it was a co-educational secondary school situated in Hollyfield Road, Surbiton. In 1960 it was renamed Hollyfield County Secondary School, later becoming Hollyfield School.

In 1966 the school moved to its current site at the top of Surbiton Hill Road, in buildings previously used by Surbiton County Grammar School. The site then expanded with the addition of new buildings. In 1987, a proposal to close Hollyfield and use the premises as a sixth form college was rejected, and the school continued. In December 1995, after a ballot of parents, Hollyfield became a grant-maintained school.

=== Technology College and Academy status ===
Hollyfield School was awarded specialist Technology College status in September 2003. This followed work since 1999 when the governing body and the Local Education Authority (LEA) approved a bid to the Department for Education and Skills (DfES) and by July 2002 the school had raised the required £50,000 sponsorship, and the bid went ahead. The award gave the school an additional £800,000 funding over five years.

On 1 December 2011, Hollyfield School converted into a academy.

== Houses ==
There are three houses, each with its own colour: Eagle (Red), Falcon (Blue) & Osprey (Yellow). The three houses compete for house points throughout the year. 'House Points' are given to students for exemplary classwork, home-learning or in extra-curricular activities. At the end of the year, the houses compete during 'Sports Day', and the overall winning house is announced.

Inter-house competitions have been played which include cricket, rugby and more.

== Alumni ==
- Eric Clapton — guitarist, singer, songwriter
- Finn Cole — actor
- Joe Cole — actor
- Ben Hawkey — actor
- Camilla Kerslake — classical crossover singer
- Moe Sbihi — GB Rowing 8+ 2012 Olympics
