= Thames Ditton =

Village in Surrey, England

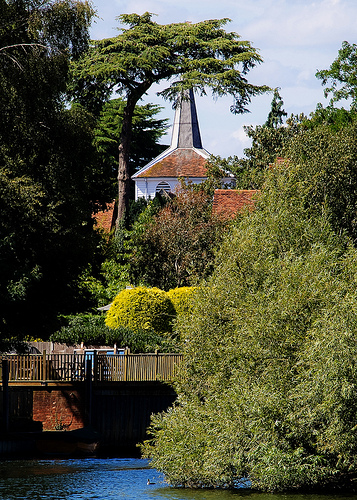
- St Nicholas' church and riverside terrace and trees from across the Thames

- Location within Surrey
- Area: 1.88 km^{2} (0.73 sq mi)
- Population: 9,400 (2021 census)
  - Density: 5,000/km^{2} (13,000/sq mi)
- OS grid reference: TQ155675
- Civil parish: n/a
- District: Elmbridge
- Shire county: Surrey
- Region: South East
- Country: England
- Sovereign state: United Kingdom
- Post town: THAMES DITTON
- Postcode district: KT7
- Dialling code: 020
- Police: Surrey
- Fire: Surrey
- Ambulance: South East Coast
- UK Parliament: Esher and Walton

Thames Ditton is a large suburban village on the River Thames, in the Elmbridge borough of Surrey, England. Apart from a large inhabited island in the river, it lies on the southern bank, centred 12.2 miles (19.6 km) south-west of Charing Cross in central London. Thames Ditton is just outside Greater London but within the Greater London Urban Area, as defined by the Office for National Statistics. Its clustered village centre and shopping area on a winding High Street is surrounded by housing, schools and sports areas. Its riverside faces the Thames Path and Hampton Court Palace Gardens and golf course in the London Borough of Richmond upon Thames. Its most commercial area is spread throughout its conservation area and contains restaurants, cafés, shops and businesses.

Thames Ditton joins Long Ditton and Weston Green in occupying the land between Surbiton, Esher and East Molesey. Although reduced to less than one square mile (2.6 km^{2}), it formerly covered more than four square miles (10 km^{2}).

== History ==
=== Before 1800 ===
The first written record of Thames Ditton is in a charter dated 983 when King Æthelred the Unready granted to Æthelmær, his minister, nine hides (cassati) at Thames Ditton, Surrey. In The Cartulary of the Abbey of Eynsham Transaction, King Æthelred sent to Eynsham Abbey confirmation of the foundation (in 1005) by Æthelmær, the endowment including 20 hides at Esher, Surrey (granted by Beorhthelm, bishop, to Æthelweard, and bequeathed by Æthelweard to his son, Æthelmær); and land at Thames Ditton, Surrey, among several other items.

Two Dittons appear in the Domesday Book of 1086 as Ditone and Ditune. Under the Normans, the one now identified with Thames Ditton was held by Wadard from the Bishop of Bayeux. Its Domesday assets were: 2 1/2 hides; part of a mill worth 1s 3d, 1 1/2 ploughs, 4 acres (1.6 ha) of meadow, woodland worth 20 hogs. It rendered £4. There were four households. Other manors that came to form part of Thames Ditton were those of Weston, Imworth (or Imber), and for a while, Claigate (Claygate). From Domesday, the combined population of Thames Ditton (4), Long Ditton (11), Immeworth (2) and Weston (9) was some 26 households of villagers and smallholders.

Later, the manors of both Dittons were reunited when Anne Gould inherited the manor of Thames Ditton and married Thomas Evelyn, who had inherited the manor of (Long) Ditton. By that time the manor of Thames Ditton amounted to little by way of land and, to all effects, Thames Ditton comprised mainly the manors of Imworth and of Weston, with some lands from Claygate, Long Ditton and even Kingston extending into the present-day boundaries of Thames Ditton and Weston Green. Thus it remained still in 1848, comprising "about 3,000 acres (12 km^{2})".

Under Eynsham Abbey, Thames Ditton had been parcelled with Esher. It was in the Saxon's Elmbridge hundred, where its local aristocracy would convene for strategic and administrative purposes. Salter's introduction to the Cartulary notes that along with Esher, Eynsham appears to have lost Thames Ditton by the time of the Norman Conquest. The Domesday survey recorded that (before the Conquest) Ditton had been held by Earl Harald (subsequently King until 1066). In Domesday, Thames Ditton (as well as adjacent Long Ditton and 'Ember' or Immeworth, later Imber Court) is listed within Kingston Hundred; in Speed's map of Surrey (1611) it is said to be in Kingston Hundred. Subsequent records assert not only Thames Ditton was in Kingston Hundred but remained part of its parish as a chapelry.

Following the Normon Conquest, part of the land was granted to the monks of Merton Priory by Gilbert the Norman. A chapel – now the church – was built, the first recorded incumbent being in 1179. The chapelry of Thames Ditton was subordinate to Kingston Rectory until the late 1700s. By Act of Parliament in 1769, Thames Ditton, which had from the early 1600s assumed the civilian vestry responsibilities of a parish, became a separate curacy and an ecclesiastical parish in its own right, subsuming Hinchley Wood, Claygate and Weston Green. (Long Ditton remained a separate parish, not within the Kingston Rectory, despite attempts during Cromwell's time to fuse the two).

But, the advowson remained in the hands of the Hardinge family of Kingston until Nicholas Hardinge sold it, along with the advowson of Kingston and other subordinate chapelries, to King's College, Cambridge in 1781, subject to a long lease otherwise disposed of. The Hardinges retained the right of presentation for a period (then subsequently leased that too). Rev Henry Hardinge, Rector of Kingston, was also the incumbent at St Nicholas for a brief and ill-starred time.

Isolated on marshy wetlands, the village seems to have avoided the travails of Kingston (a strategic garrison town often pillaged). It remained a relatively insignificant settlement of farming Manors. The Chancery Rolls of 1212 do note that King John was entertained at Ditton by Geoffrey Fitz Pierre, the Chief Justice. This was most likely on the site of Imber Court. Another substantial house was on the site close to the chapel of ease, now the Church.

Thames Ditton became more significant after Hampton Court Palace was built by Thomas Wolsey in the early 16th century. Once the palace was claimed by Henry VIII in 1525, palace officials and other workers took up residence in Thames Ditton. With Thames Ditton Island, it was a useful crossing point across the River Thames from Surrey to the palace in Middlesex, before the bridge at Hampton Court was built in 1752–1753.

Development in the village suffered greatly when Henry VIII acquired most of the lands and enclosed them within the deer Chase in the Honour of Hampton Court. Following his death, residents of the area successfully petitioned for it to be de-Chased, and normal activities resumed. From that time the convenience of Thames Ditton to London – two or three hours by horse or carriage; the cachet of nearby Hampton Court, Claremont and Esher Place, Royal Kingston with its market and coach service, and the still rural aspect of the village prompted many to make their main or second homes there. A richly diverse crop of residents both notable and less so resulted.

During the 18th century, lawlessness grew in the region, and the roads around the village were plagued with highwaymen, in particular the turnpike to Portsmouth. Influential men began to band together to deal with crime. Following a meeting at the Harrow Inn on 26 January 1792, a group of some 80 local men (a significant percentage of the sparse population) formed a group for "the protection of persons and property". They made a list of crimes, fines and rewards (transcript of document in the T. S. Mercer Collection of parish records, Dittons Library).

An Act of Parliament of 1769 enabled the parish to be formally established and to secede from the parish of All Saints', Kingston. Many significant residents of Thames Ditton were also senior figures in the administration of Kingston, and the courts of Kingston held jurisdiction over both Kingston and Elmbridge Hundreds. Thames Ditton came under the Metropolitan Police rather than the Surrey Police until the present millennium. Most other aspects of local administration in the Victorian era: roads, drains, gas, electricity, the Poor Union, were managed by Kingston until reform of local government led to the establishment of the Esher and the Dittons Urban District Council in 1894. But, Thames Ditton was always clearly outside the area governed by the Corporation of Kingston. In 1965 the government had difficulty drawing the boundaries of Greater London satisfactorily to please various interests.

=== Post–1800 ===
In 1801, the population of Thames Ditton parish, which at that stage included Weston Green, Hinchley Wood and Claygate, was still small: 1,288 people living in 265 houses; 167 of the workers were occupied in agriculture and 87 in trade, manufacture and handicraft. Due to the large number of mansions and estates in the area, there would have been many domestic and ancillary employees living in the village, some working at Hampton Court Palace.

During the 19th century, the village continued to grow, with the arrival of the London and South Western Railway in 1849 and the building of the first school. Market gardens were established in the fields around the Church to supply the metropolis. By the end of the century, the population had almost doubled but was still fairly sparse. In 1913 a booklet of 'The Suburban and Provincial Development Association' noted: "the population of the district is only about two to the acre" and "some of the trains perform the journey to Waterloo in as little as 24 minutes."

Either side of 1900 the convenience to London and boating attractions of the Thames helped to make Thames Ditton a destination of choice for weekenders including a sizeable community from the world of popular entertainment in London. Local life was completely changed by the expansion of London's suburbs, and in the period between the World Wars most of the farming fields were sold off for housing development, and the big landowners, now richer, decamped.

Around 1812, a school for girls was started thanks to wealthy people such as Baroness de Ros. Some form of National School for girls operated from September 1812, and boys were taught from 1818. At least 60 girls were being educated in 1816–17, some coming from Molesey and Tolworth.

In the 1840s, there was a National School housed near St Nicholas' churchyard. In 1860, the Rev EH Rogers laid the first stone of the schools at the end of Church Walk where generations of Thames Ditton children were educated. It was expanded in 1877.

There had long been a wharf near the Swan Inn on the river and this became a site for local industry. A 'Melting House' between the churchyard and the river became the Thames Ditton Foundry, a skilled bronze foundry in 1874, and successively as Cox & Son (1874–1880), Drew & Sons (1880–1883), Moore & Co (1883–1897), Hollinshead & Burton (1897–1902) and A.B. Burton (1902–1939); the foundry was supreme in its field. It produced fine bronze statues exported worldwide, including the Shaftesbury Memorial Fountain, Victoria Memorial (London) and the giant Quadriga (Wellington Arch) at Hyde Park Corner.

Nearby, at Ferry Works on the river bank, was the factory of Willans & Robinson who in the late 19th century made a high-speed steam engine (the Willans engine) used for early generation of electric power in places such as the Vienna State Opera. The works is preserved and in use by a number of commercial companies including a broadcast software developer, an international communications and information technology company serving government and commercial markets, a company specialising in numerically controlled machines and a leading architectural practice.

During 1901 and 1908, John Ernest Hutton produced a motorcycle called Princeps at Thames Ditton.

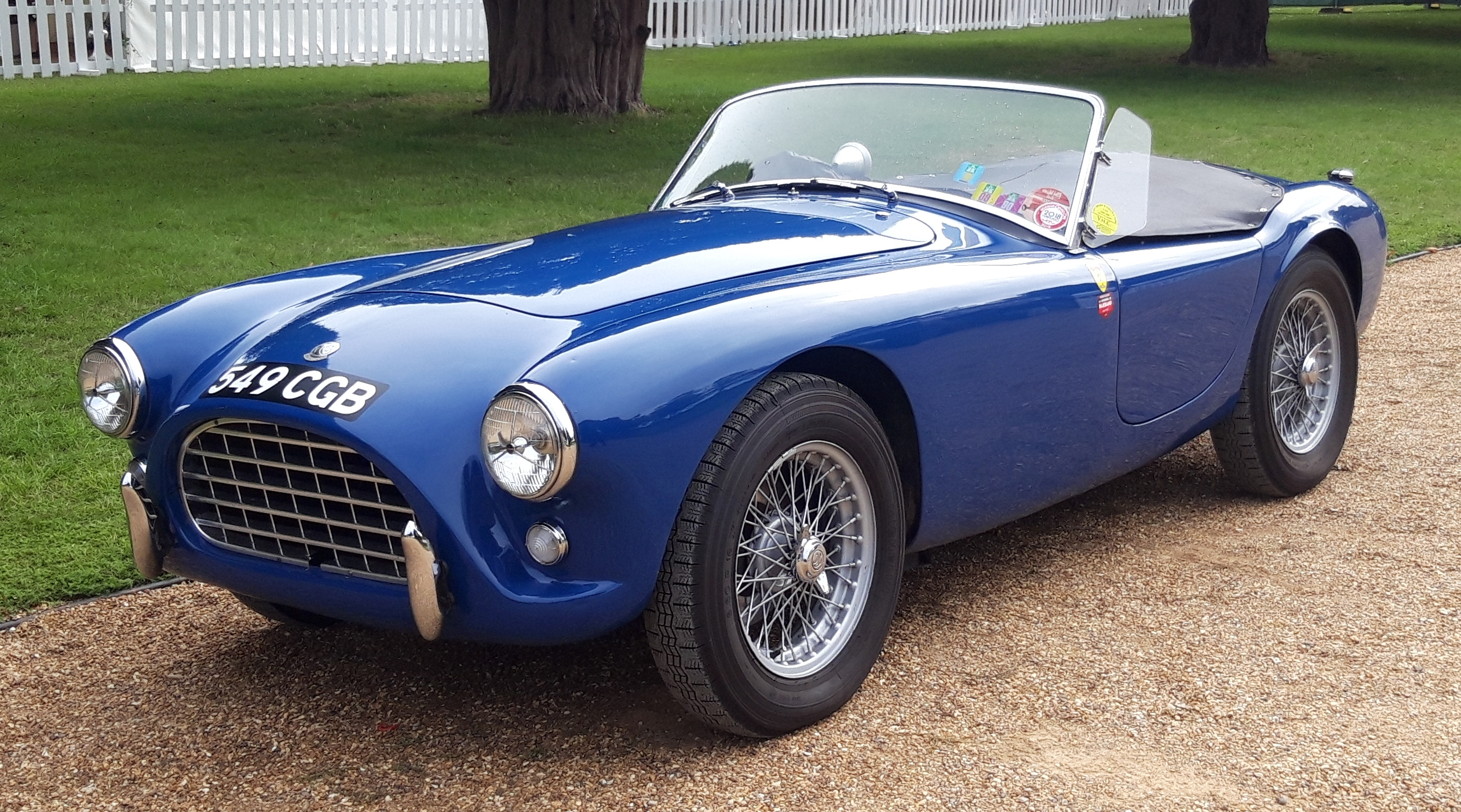
1960 AC Ace

Between 1911 and 1984, the village was home to the AC Cars factory, first at Ferry Works and later in the High Street at a site since developed into a residential and office complex.

A pair of "Ditton" speakers produced by Celestion

Celestion manufactured for some years at Ferry Works and adjacent buildings, producing the "Ditton" range of loudspeakers. British Rola bought Celestion in 1947 and moved production to Thames Ditton a year later. The name of the company changed to Rola Celestion; with its products sold under the brand name "Celestion". (MPP, later a camera maker, was formed as a subsidiary during the war.)

From its creation in 1933 to its dissolution in 1994, the Milk Marketing Board, a government agency to support milk production and distribution in the United Kingdom, was headquartered at Giggs Hill Green in Thames Ditton. Its large site, already licensed for commercial use, was targeted by Tesco for a supermarket and garage in the early 1990s but local action secured it for a housing development with public tennis courts, a recreational area and two acres for community health purposes.

In 1951, the civil parish had a population of 18,272. On 1 April 1974, the parish was abolished.

=== Historical figures ===
- Lord Henry FitzGerald (1761–1829)
- Charlotte FitzGerald-de Ros, 21st Baroness de Ros (1769–1831)
- Colonel Sidney Godolphin (1652–1732)
- Maundy Gregory (1 July 1877 – 28 September 1941)
- Dudley Carleton, 1st Viscount Dorchester (1573–1632), lived at Imber Court
- Cesar Picton (1755–1836) – a successful businessman, who owned a wharf and a malt house
- Reverend George Harvest (1728–1789)
- Arthur Onslow (1691–1768)
- George Onslow, 1st Earl of Onslow (1731–1814)
- Edward Sugden, 1st Baron St Leonards (1781–1875)
- Hewett Watson 9 May 1804, and died at Thames Ditton, Surrey, on 27 July 1881
- Julian Stafford Corbett 12 November 1854 – 21 September 1922 (Brought up at Imber Court Weston Green)
- Christian de Duve, Belgian, Nobel Prize for Physiology or Medicine 1974, born in Thames-Ditton in 1917.
- Marie Lloyd
- Sydney Camm Designer of the Hawker Hurricane. Lived in Thames Ditton

== Amenities ==
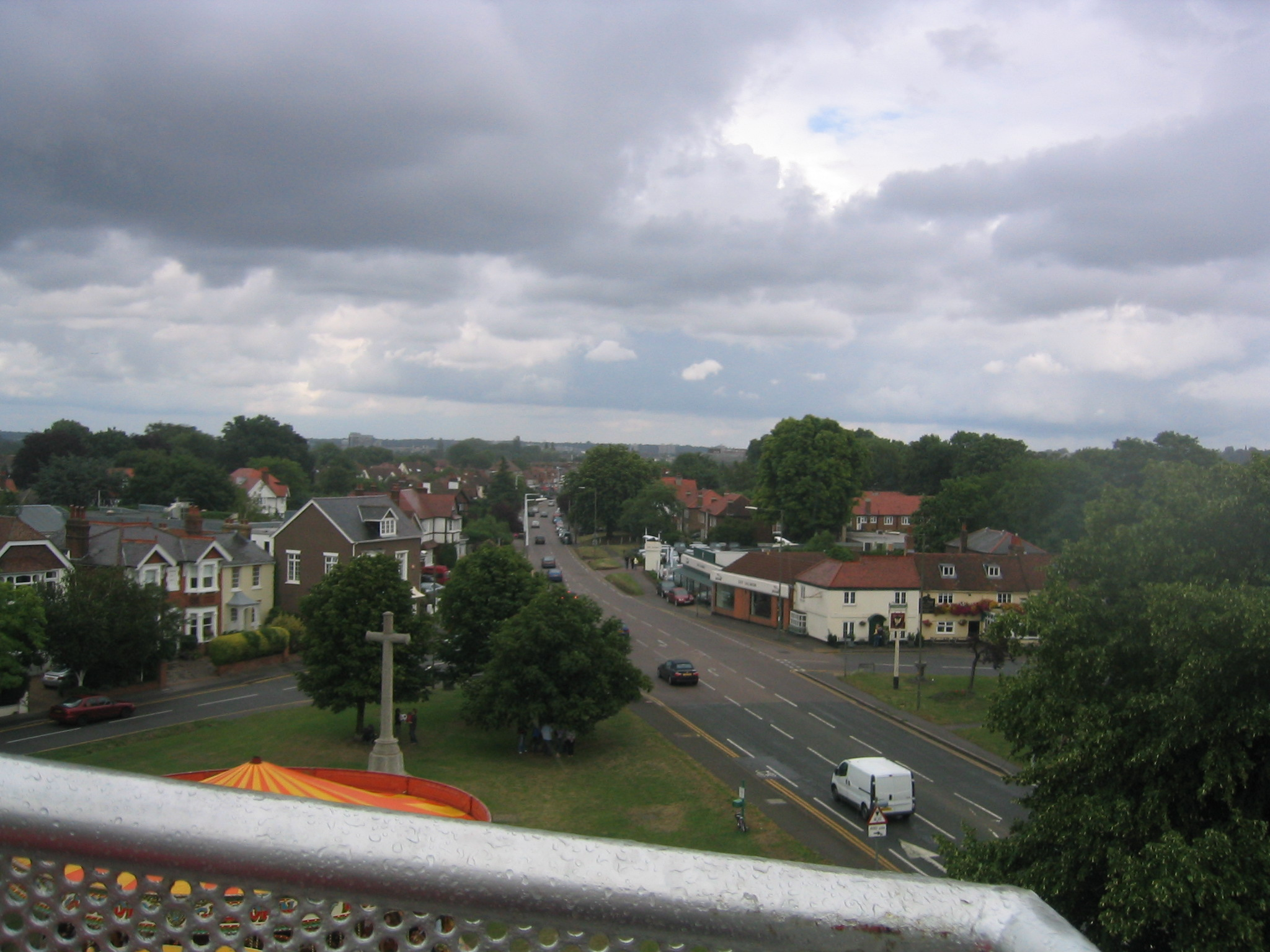
Portsmouth Road, Thames Ditton

The High Street is a conservation area that has a mixture of residential housing, office and retail shops in about equal proportion. It retains a greengrocery, florist, coffee/delicatessen shop, four restaurants, sandwich/coffee shops and two convenience stores. There are also a hairdressers, estate agents, two gift shops, a silversmith and jewellers, tennis and hockey equipment shop, a small modern art gallery, two beauty salons and an undertaker. In nearby Summer Road, there is a newsagent, convenience store, dry cleaners and a high end interior designer. There are six pubs in the village, two with riverside frontages including the George and Dragon on the corner of High Street. Station Road hosts Thames Ditton Farmers' Market every fourth Saturday of the month.

At Winters Bridge on the Portsmouth Road there is a small parade of shops that includes a nationally recognised patisserie and chocolatier. There is another off-licence, a pharmacy and newsagent on Thorkhill Road, formerly Workhouse Lane.

The village has a Residents' Association, which was formed in 1934.

A small United Reformed Church was added in the 19th century. The Vera Fletcher Hall, known as "The Theatre in Thames Ditton", is on Embercourt Road, near to the railway station. The old Victorian Village Hall was built in 1887 to commemorate Queen Victoria's Golden Jubilee, as a gift to the community from local benefactor Hannibal Speer (born Hannibal Sandys) Lord of the Manor of Weston. Over the years, the village hall has been able to attract stars such as Petula Clark (who opened the hall), Dorothy Tutin, Denis Quilley, Janet Suzman, John Julius Norwich, Susannah York, the English National Opera and the Royal Shakespeare Company with their "Shakespeare Revue". Local drama and music groups present performances at the hall on a regular basis.

The Rythe is a small river that bisected the southwest of the old parish in running almost along the Portsmouth Road and turns north near Ferry Road to drain into the Thames at which point it formed the old border with Long Ditton, which had a narrow riverside.

Ye Olde Harrow, an historic inn was a base for the local militia in the days of highwaymen (see above) and subsequently hosted one of the oldest bowling greens in the county. It is to be demolished and several houses are to be built on the site.

== Localities ==
Further churches and facilities in the arguably independent, contiguous and inchoate locality of Weston Green which is termed by its residents association a 'village' but retains a strong association with Thames Ditton. It has three residential roads indistinct as to at which point along them the boundary between the two lies, while other parts of the former parish of Thames Ditton, such as Hinchley Wood and Claygate, have taken on separate identities; they have become part of the Esher post town. The Giggs Hill area takes its name from Giggs Hill Green.

== Landmarks ==
=== Boyle Farm ===
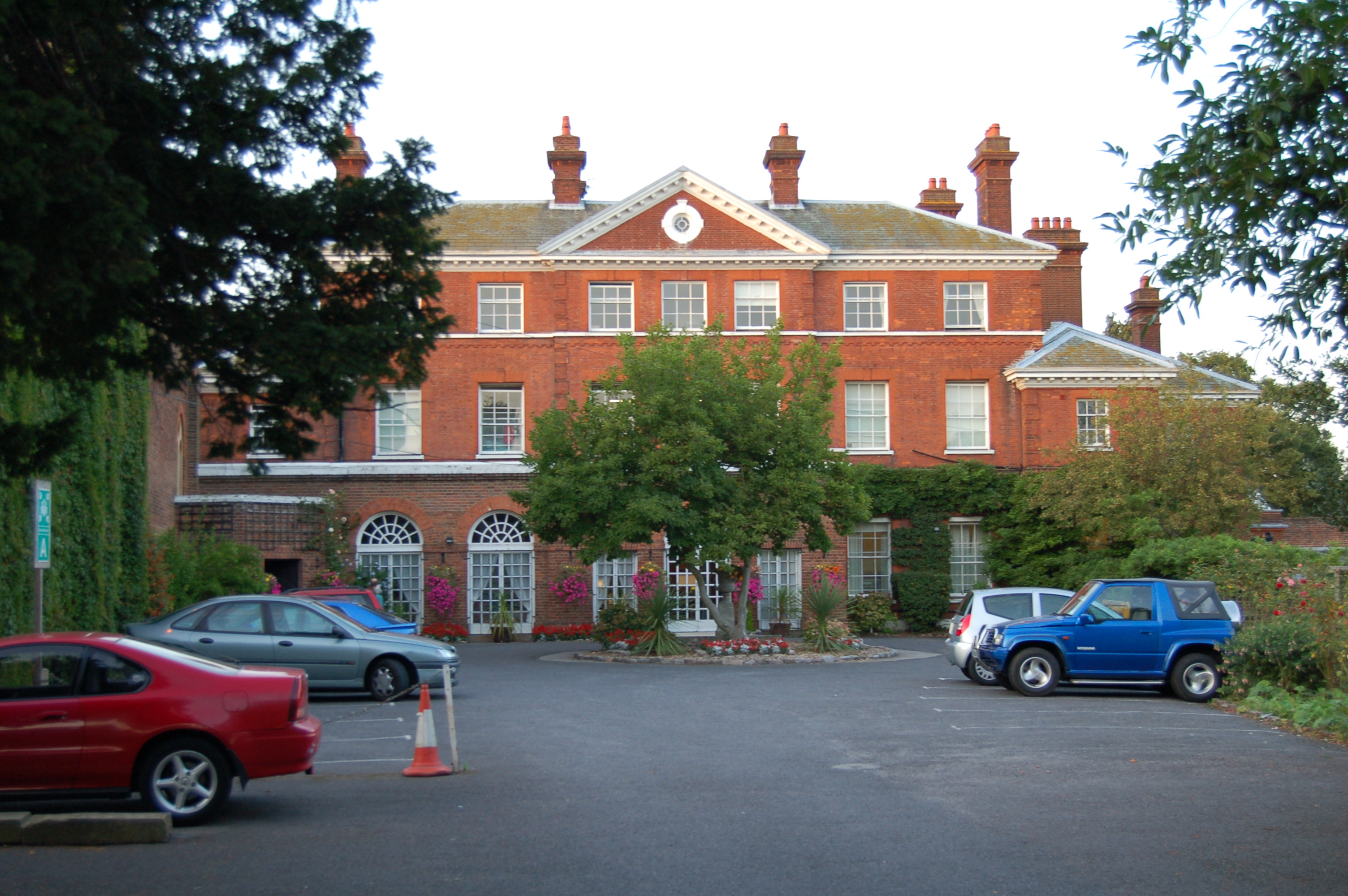
Boyle Farm as today's Home of Compassion

51.392°N 0.331°W
Boyle Farm was the earlier name of the Home of Compassion, a wide range mansion care home by the River Thames formerly set among fields rather than private houses. The country house replaced the farmhouse of Forde's Farm in 1786 when built by the Honourable Charlotte Boyle Walsingham. Although the estate has been sold and divided into expensive building plots over the past century, some of the farm buildings and outhouses remain. It has river frontage and used to own a small island in the Thames, which the frontage (mooring) overlooks, called Boyle Farm Island. The building is currently a nursing home run by a board of trustees.

=== St Nicholas' Church ===
The ecclesiastical parish church (since the English Reformation, implying Church of England) was built almost wholly in the early medieval period demonstrates fine architecture and is listed in the highest category of building.

=== Giggs Hill Green ===
This triangular village green adjoins Portsmouth Road and gives its name to a locality of the village marked on some maps, but within any official status such as wards, the main secondary parade of shops of the village is here, which also serves that part of Long Ditton on the riverside part of the Portsmouth Road. There is no hill here and its 8 acres (3.2 ha) were purchased in 1901 by the Esher and Dittons Urban District Council for its cricket green and remainder for its park benches and to allow picnics and informal sport.

== Transport ==
=== Railway ===
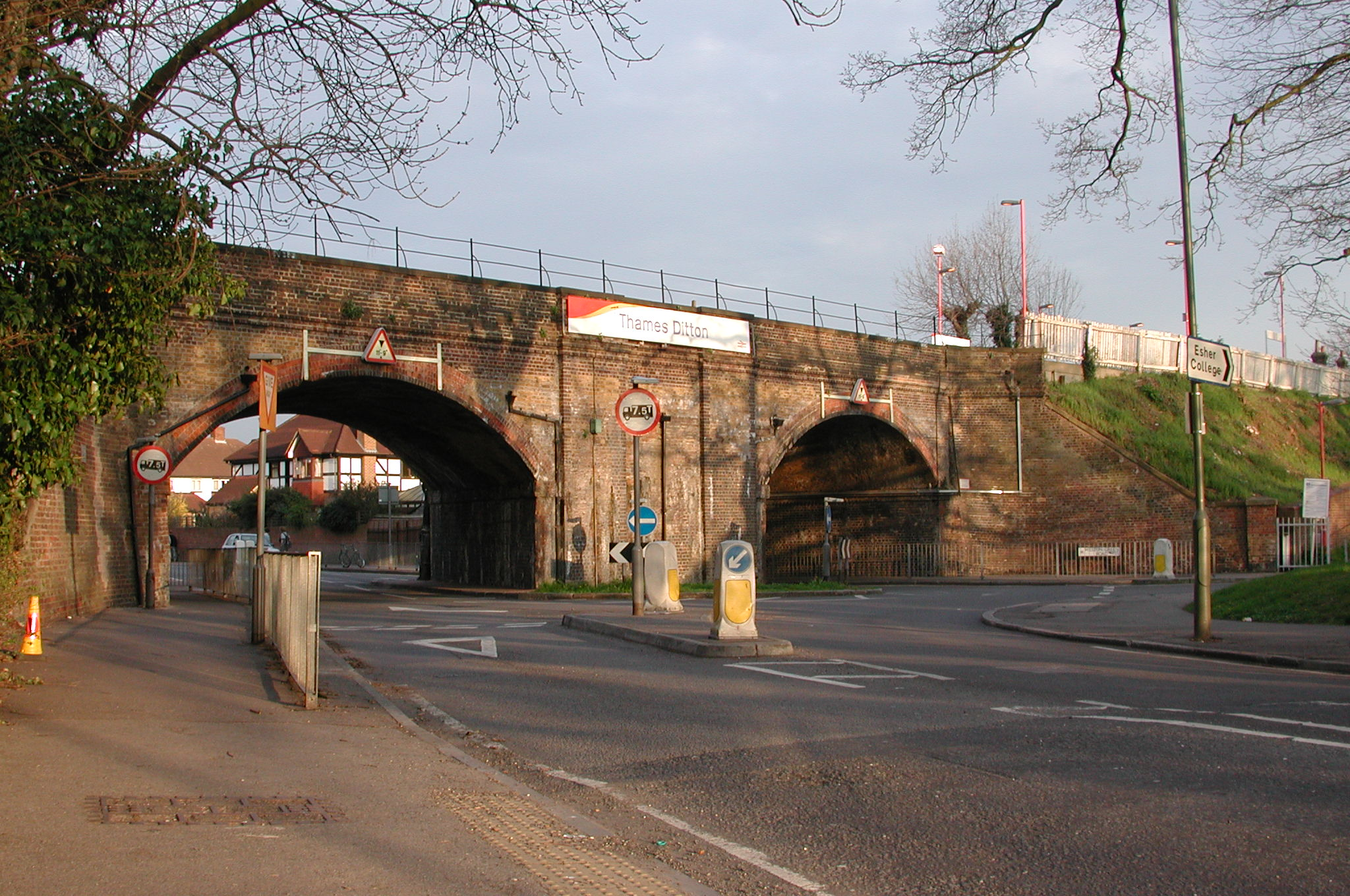
Thames Ditton railway bridge-turned-viaduct is a landmark for its scale of brickwork and its layout of a roundabout beneath it

Thames Ditton railway station is sited 0.31 miles (500 m) from the riverside end of the village centre and Weston Green. It is a stop on the Hampton Court branch line which connects London Waterloo with Hampton Court. Services are provided by South Western Railway. The journey time to London Waterloo is 33 minutes; it is also possible to connect with faster trains at Surbiton.

=== Buses ===
Several bus routes run through Thames Ditton, including:

- 458 and 715 which run via the Portsmouth Road to serve Walton, Staines, Cobham and Guildford. The 715 is diverted via Thames Ditton on Sundays.
- 513 (Mon-Fri, twice daily, Kingston-Thames Ditton-Esher-Oxshott-Cobham)
- 514 (Mon-Sat, twice daily, Kingston-Surbiton-Thames Ditton-East and West Molesey-Fieldcommon-Hersham-Weybridge-Brooklands)
- 515 (Mon-Sat, hourly, Kingston-Surbiton-Thames Ditton-Esher-Hersham-Weybridge)

=== Roads ===
From Thames Ditton, it takes approximately five minutes by road to the A3 (eastbound) or ten minutes to A3 (both ways). It is 15 minutes to the M3 motorway and M25 and about 35 minutes to Heathrow Airport, with typical traffic. Despite the further distance, it can take as little as 45 minutes to reach Gatwick Airport. Occasionally, these times may be affected by racing at Kempton Park Racecourse and/or Sandown Park.

== Education ==
- Thames Ditton Infant School
- Thames Ditton Junior School
- St Paul's RC Primary School

Senior education is provided at Hinchley Wood School and Esher College.

Preparatory and independent schools (private sector junior to 13 years and at senior levels) are nearby, including one in Weston Green.

== Demography and housing ==
2011 Census Homes
Output area	Detached	Semi-detached	Terraced	Flats and apartments	Caravans/temporary/mobile homes	Shared between households
(ward)	725	719	349	653	5	0

The average level of accommodation in the region composed of detached houses was 28% and apartments was 22.6%.

2011 Census Key Statistics
Output area	Population	Households	% Owned outright	% Owned with a loan	Hectares
(ward)	6,307	2,451	34	46	188

The proportion of households in the settlement who owned their home outright compares to the regional average of 35.1%. The proportion who owned their home with a loan compares to the regional average of 32.5%. The remaining % is made up of rented dwellings, plus a negligible % of households living rent-free.

== Flooding ==
The village was partly hit by the Great Flood of 1968 when the rivers Ember and Mole burst their banks. The extent of the flooding reached from the western points of the Portsmouth Road to the River Thames and caused flood damage to many homes, including some in the west of Weston Green. The floodwaters did not subside for a number of days.

On 30 November 2006, a 1,200-millimetre (47 in) diameter water pipe, believed to be over 150 years old, burst in a garden near the railway station. This caused flooding in two local streets. The floods reached the infants school's grounds and high street, shops and two houses close to the Thames.

== Sport ==
Thames Ditton Cricket Club is the oldest sports club in the area. The first recorded match on Giggs Hill Green was in 1833, and the club remains with hundreds of members and a recently built brand new pavilion. They have three Saturday XIs and one Sunday team. The club celebrated its 175th anniversary in 2008 and, in 2009, contracted former West Indies cricket captain Richie Richardson to coach and play for the team for the following four years.

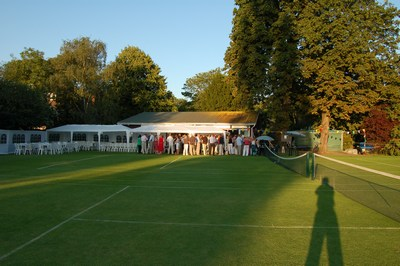
Summer party at the tennis club

Weston Green Road is the location of Thames Ditton Lawn Tennis Club (TDLTC). The club was ravaged in the 1990s by a protracted legal battle with the owner of the site freehold, who wished to build executive homes on the site. Though TDLTC eventually won the case, it lost the rights to use three courts on the adjoining Esher College site, which were themselves subsequently sold to developers. However, the club still owns six grass and four hard courts, along with one short tennis court. It also has access to a three new hard courts at Esher College, and a weekend arrangement with Kingston Grammar School to use its courts as an overflow for the junior section.

The Thames Ditton Squash Club is now housed at Colets' Health and Fitness Club. It has several national club championships to its name, as well as a strong record in the European championships. The same fitness club is also the headquarters of a number of rugby and football teams of the Old Paulines (St. Paul's School alumni) who own the grounds.

In Weston Green, there is the Old Cranleighan Rugby Football Club, as well as the Old Cranleighan Hockey Club. Having been formed in 1919 and 1921 respectively, the OCRFC and the OCHC moved to their new clubhouse in a secluded position off Portsmouth Road in 1928. The clubhouse was substantially renovated and enlarged in 1993 and the club now has some of the best facilities for rugby and hockey in Surrey. OC Rugby started a Mini Rugby section in September 2011, which has been very successful in providing a fun and controlled introduction to rugby for local children on Sunday mornings.

Thames Ditton Football club was formed in 2019, from football coaches for Thames Ditton schools football club. The club has a veterans side (38+) currently in division 2 of the West London Veterans football league.

Metropolitan Police F.C. of the Southern Football League are based in Thames Ditton.

Thames Ditton Regatta, founded in 1948, is a rowing regatta which takes place in May on a course which finishes just below the River Mole, opposite Hampton Court Palace.

The traditional river sports of skiffing and punting are possible at Dittons Skiff and Punting Club at the end of Queen's Road. The club was formed in 1923 and is involved in various water-based activities including the Great River Race and Thames meanders. It hosts the Hampton Court and Dittons Regatta and has its own annual regatta on the river opposite Hampton Court Palace.

== Cultural references ==
Literature – non-fiction

Charles Lamb in his letter to William Wordsworth of 19 October 1810 writes about the place:

A very striking instance of your position might be found in the churchyard of Ditton-upon-Thames, if you know such a place. Ditton-upon-Thames has been blessed by the residence of a poet who, for love or money, I do not well know which, has dignified every gravestone for the last few years with brand new verses, all different and all ingenious, with the author's name at the bottom of each. This sweet Swan of Thames has so artfully diversified his strains and his rhymes that the same thought never occurs twice,--more justly, perhaps, as no thought ever occurs at all, there was a physical impossibility that the same thought should recur, It is long since I saw and read these inscriptions; but I remember the impression was of a smug usher at his desk in the intervals of instruction, levelling his pen. Of death, as it consists of dust and worms, and mourners and uncertainty, he had never thought; but the word "death" he had often seen separate and conjunct with other words, till he had learned to speak of all its attributes as glibly as Unitarian Belsham will discuss you the attributes of the word "God" in a pulpit, and will talk of infinity with a tongue that dangles from a skull that never reached in thought and thorough imagination two inches, or farther than from his hand to his mouth, or from the vestry to the sounding-board of the pulpit. But the epitaphs were trim and sprag, and patent, and pleased the survivors of Thames Ditton above the old mumpsimus of Afflictions sore.

Literature – fiction and verse

In 1834, well after the lock below was built, Theodore Hook composed an ode or tribute, fishing from a punt here:

Here, in a placid waking dream
I'm free from worldly troubles,
Calm as the rippling silver stream
That in the sunshine baubles;

And when sweet Eden's blissful bowers
Some abler bard has writ on,
Despairing to transcend his powers,
I'll ditto say for Ditton

He also wrote verse about The Swan Inn that year.

Eric Wilson Barker (1905–1973), poet, spent his childhood in the village, attended the old church school in Church Walk, then his family emigrated to California for health reasons. Barker became a celebrate and was offered the laureateship of California, which he declined. He revisited his birthplace in 1959 and wrote to a friend: 'I visited an ancient pub, The Old Harrow near Weston Green. I always remember the lines on the signboard of that inn when I was a kid.... There it was too and the old weatherworn sign with the letters a bit dim but still legible!' Barker wrote a poem "IN THAMES DITTON" under Looking for Water, published 1964: "In Thames Ditton I remembered a clock....."

Ernest William Hornung penned a very brief local stay of the narrator-protagonist in The Amateur Cracksman (1899):

I had let my flat in town, and taken inexpensive quarters at Thames Ditton, on the plea of a disinterested passion for the river. Imagine my excitement and delight! I managed to pay what I owed at Thames Ditton, to squeeze a small editor for a very small check, and my tailors for one more flannel suit. I remember that I broke my last sovereign to get a box of Sullivan's cigarettes for Raffles to smoke on the voyage.

Literature – biographic main references

Thomas Babington Macaulay rented lodgings a year near Esher railway station (then still "Ditton Marsh") while writing some of his History of England. His nephew and biographer Otto Trevelyan wrote in 1876: "His brother-in-law had taken a house in the village of Esher; and Macaulay accordingly settled himself, with infinite content, exactly in the middle of the only ugly square mile of country which can be found in that delightful neighbourhood. 'I am pretty well pleased,' he says, 'with my ... pleasant, small dwelling, surrounded by geraniums and roses... The only complaint I have to make is that the view from my front windows is blocked by a railway embankment.' Macaulay's cottage, which stood in Ditton Marsh, by the side of the high-road from Kingston to Esher, was called Greenwood Lodge."

Television

Monty Python, regularly poking jibes at adjoining Esher, in the sketch, 'Blackmail' has a scene in "Thames Ditton" filmed in a west London residential road.

Exterior scenes for the 1980s sitcom After Henry were shot on the village High Street.

In Amazon's 2019 series Hanna, the titular character's friend Sophie and her family live in Thames Ditton.

== Notable residents ==
- Lucy Alexander – television presenter
- Trevor Bannister – actor, "Mr Lucas" in Are You Being Served?
- Charlie Brooks – actress
- Rory Burns - Cricketer for Surrey CCC and England
- Sydney Camm – aircraft designer famous for having designed the Hawker Hurricane lived in Thames Ditton
- Christian de Duve, Nobel-Prize (1974), born Thames Ditton 1917
- Dick Emery – comedian, lived in Thames Ditton between 1958 and 1964
- Rob Henderson - Rugby player, British and Irish Lion 704
- Charles Heslop – actor, born Thames Ditton 8 June 1883 – 13 April 1966.
- Ronan Keating – pop singer
- Billy Merson – lived on the Thames Ditton Island in a bungalow.
- Laurence Naismith – actor, born Thames Ditton 1908
- Cesar Picton – a black servant from Senegal lived in Thames Ditton and ran a successful coal business from Kingston. His house is still visible and marked with a plaque and his house, by the river in Kingston, is also marked.
- Dominic Raab – former Deputy Prime Minister
- Douglas Reeman – writer, born in Thames Ditton 1924
- Henry Smith – recipient of the Victoria Cross
- Haydn Tanner – Welsh international rugby union player who represented both Wales and the British and Irish Lions
- Hewett Watson – phrenologist, friend of Charles Darwin, evolutionary botanist
