= Thames Ditton Island =

Island in the River Thames in Surrey, England

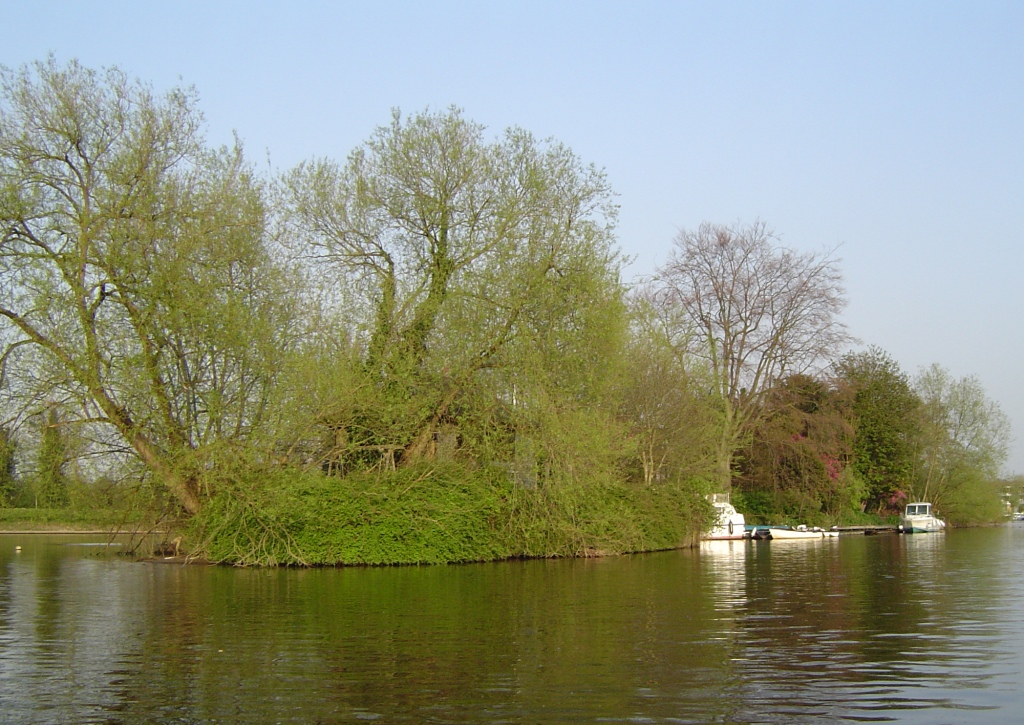
Swan Island, the middle of the three islands, with Boyle Farm Island behind

Three river islands (aits) form a linear group, close to the junction of the two main old streets of Thames Ditton village, in the River Thames in a corner of modern Surrey, on the Kingston reach above Teddington Lock. Thames Ditton Island, the dominant ait, is 350 yards (320 m) long and has 48 houses with gardens (and moorings); Boyle Farm Island has one house; Swan Island, between the two, is the smallest.

== History ==
1871 map of Thames Ditton Island (in upper half of picture)

Henry VIII lived at Hampton Court 300 years before there were any Thames locks; these reached Teddington from upriver by 1810. Kingston Bridge was the only bridge above London Bridge and below the (at latest 1530s-built) Chertsey Bridge. Travelling from London to Hampton Court, instead of carriages through villages of Middlesex including the market town of Brentford monarchs down to the last regular visitor, George II, tended to be rowed up from Westminster to the palace. As the lack of locks and limited fish weirs (under Magna Carta) attest, the river beside the palace was a broad but twisting creek, especially at low tide at times of lower rainfall. To have a grander arrival and alleviate flooding of the village, Cardinal Wolsey or Henry had the main channel locally dug out straighter, doing away with the ford from the grounds of Hampton Court on the north bank (in Middlesex). Before locks and weirs controlled the levels, Summer Road in Thames Ditton would flood at most high tides – its mud would not dry in the winter months, making it impassable, hence its name.

Before Hampton Court Bridge a ferry to Hampton Court served Oatlands Palace and the western third of Surrey, laden with carriages and carts. This lane ran northwards along Thames Ditton High Street, over what is now a public slipway where the river is wide, and at lowest water through the ford to the other side. When the tide was in, ferrymen would charge a groat or two. In heavy flows the river came to tidal slack water often locally; this fertilised the broad banks of flood-meadows and flooded the island and ferry in winter. Controlled flows resembled the modern level by early 19th century as any agricultural benefit was outweighed by the homes of those near the river engaged in more modern forms of work.

The first wooden bridge over the river at Hampton Court opened in 1753 and had a toll collected by a bridge-keeper. A ferry remained at the Swan Inn near the islands until at least 1911, and charged less than the toll. The original rather rickety bridge was replaced by a more substantial timber one in 1778. In 1865 this was replaced by a steel and brick bridge, and in 1933 this was in turn replaced by the existing concrete structure. The Thames locks began to appear late in the 18th century, 'Moulsey' (today called Molesey) was built in 1815.

Boyle Farm was in the 19th century the property of the 1st Lord St Leonards (1781–1875), a jurist (legal researcher and publisher), barrister, and Lord Chancellor. Until the 20th century Thames Ditton Island was part of Middlesex, and then of Greater London from 1965. The residents petitioned Middlesex County Council in 1930, requesting to be transferred from Middlesex to Surrey. The island was finally transferred from the London Borough of Richmond upon Thames, Greater London to Esher Urban District, Surrey on 1 April 1970.

== Historic use ==
Boyle Farm Island by Francis Seymour Haden (1869)

For many centuries, the island formed part of the lands of the Manor of Imworth (Imber) appurtenant to land that became Forde's Farm and later Boyle Farm. In a survey of the manor of Imber in 1608, the island was known as Colly's Eite (Ait or Eyot meaning a small island) and is recorded as '2 acres of pasture'. On the Surrey bank opposite, where the Swan Inn was built, the slipway and nearby wharf provided a useful dock for the passage of goods and people up and down the river. Large sailing barges from the Port of London would moor here to load or unload, their crews and attendant waggoners taking rest and sustenance at the inn.

The island was then not much more than a muddy hump, but the skiffs of the day trippers from Kingston would be moored there to allow their occupants to enjoy a riverside picnic. In the early 20th century came a fad for riverside weekend bungalows: the idea spread and a number of holiday chalets were built on the island. Life there must have been a matter of indoor camping, as there were no facilities of any kind: water and paraffin had to be ferried over in cans, and only the smarter sheds had a roof over the earth closet.

As time passed, the attractions of the waterside location drew more and more people, so that by 1930, the whole of the perimeter was covered in wooden bungalows, with the owners' boats moored at the bottom of their gardens. The building of the suspension bridge in 1939 by David Rowell & Co. really opened up the island as a place for permanent occupation by providing passage on foot, carrying water, electricity and gas in, and enabling installation of WCs by transferring sewage out to the town drains. Originally leased from the island's owner, the publican at the Olde Swan, by 1963 all the houses had passed into freehold ownership and a limited company was formed to take over the bridge and adjacent gardens and to provide maintenance services.

== Boyle Farm Island ==
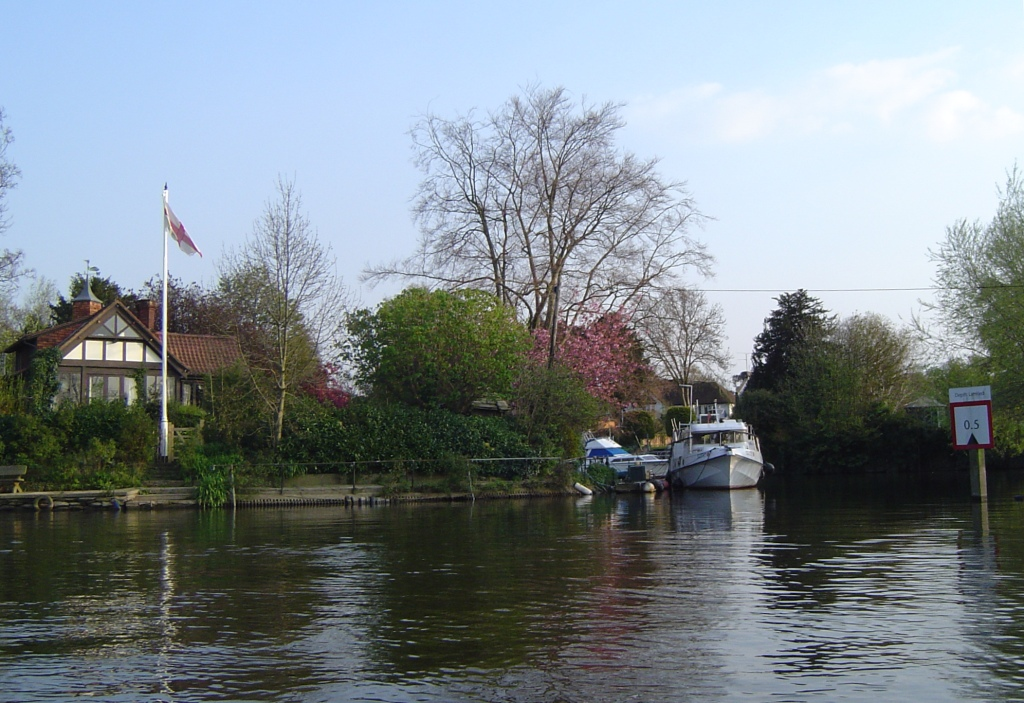
Boyle Farm Island

Boyle Farm Island is the second largest of the three islands, natural apart from one family house, and light bank reinforcement. (51°23′33.5″N 0°19′47″W) It is directly opposite the historic mansion of Boyle Farm converted to a Home of Compassion. Whereas its larger partner, Thames Ditton Island, was part of Middlesex and then Greater London, Boyle Farm Island has always pertained to land in Surrey and within the county's authorities.

== Swan Island ==
Swan Island is the smallest of the three islands. (51°23′34.5″N 0°19′50″W) On it was once the ferryman's hut, recently rebuilt by the present owner. Local historian Philip J. Burchett surmised that the original incumbent must have passed a meagre life, taking people across the main stream and to and from the island for a small fee at all times of the day and night. After flooding removed part of the upstream end of the main island, Swan Island has become linked to it by a bridge of vegetated sediment at normal flows.

== Use of the island today ==
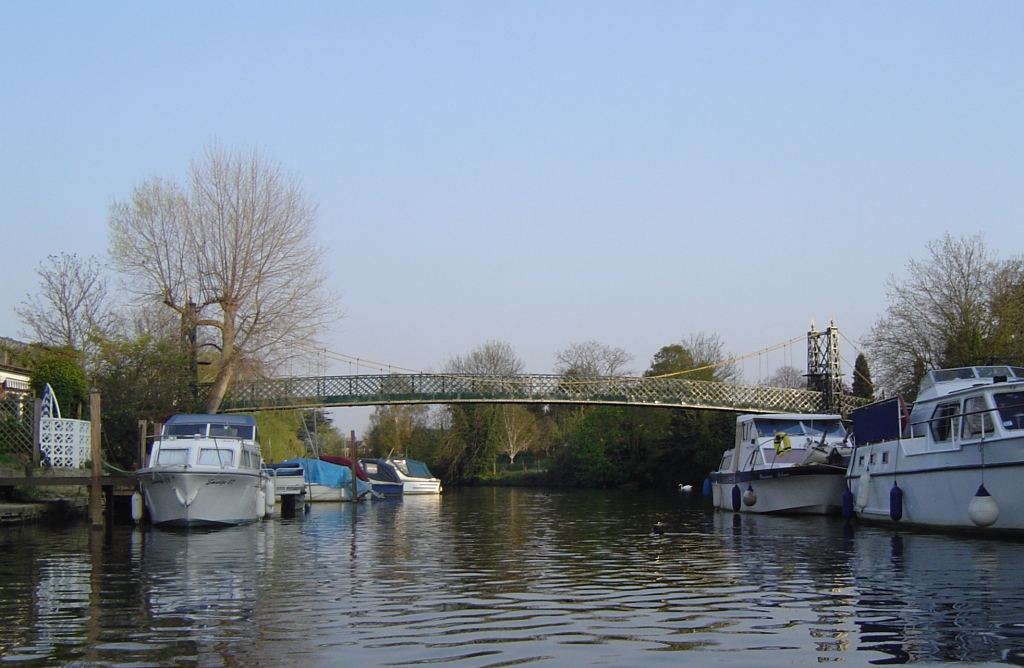
Bridge to Thames Ditton Island on the left

Each householder on the 350 yd (320 m) island is a member of the maintenance company, whose main functions are the purchase of water and the regular repainting of the bridge. Properties are private homes with dedicated moorings – in total, 47.

Nearly all the dwellings are raised on brick piles, to reduce the chance of flood damage, but in the 2007 floods the river rose to cover the island in several feet of water. In early 2014, the island was again flooded to a depth of several feet. The river level at Thames Ditton was the highest since recording began in 2003.

The island is located in the district of Elmbridge in Surrey.

== See also ==
- Islands in the River Thames

| Next island upstream | River Thames | Next island downstream |
| Ash Island | Thames Ditton Island | Raven's Ait |
