= The Championship Course =

Part of the Thames used for rowing races

Championship Course on a flood tide (e.g. for the Boat Race). The Start and Finish are reversed when racing on an ebb tide. "Middlesex" and "Surrey" denote banks of the Thames along this stretch, named for the historic counties

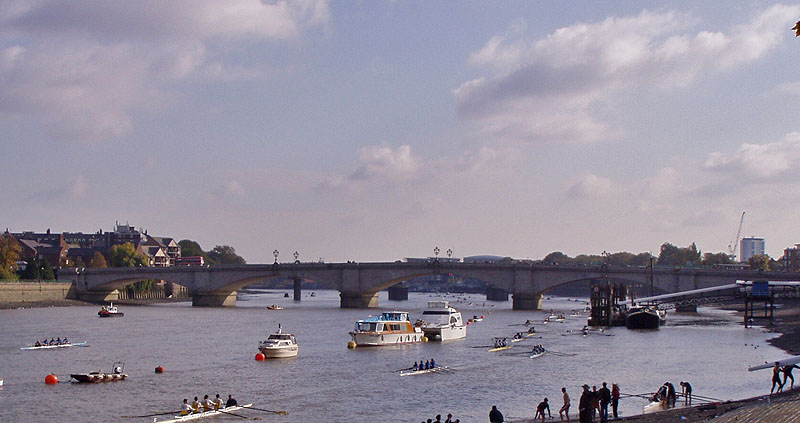
Putney Bridge

The Championship Course is a stretch of the River Thames between Mortlake and Putney in London, England. It is a well-established course for rowing races, particularly the Oxford and Cambridge Boat Race. The course is on the tidal reaches of the river often referred to as the Tideway.

== History ==
In 1845, it was agreed to stage the Boat Race (which had on five previous occasions been rowed from Westminster Bridge to Putney) on a course from 'Putney Bridge to Mortlake Church tower'. The aim was to reduce the interference from heavy river traffic.

The following year, a race for the Professional World Sculling Championship moved to the course for the first time. The Wingfield Sculls followed in 1861.

The course was later defined by two stones on the southern bank of the river, marked "U.B.R." for University Boat Race: one just downstream of Chiswick Bridge, close to The Ship public house, and the other just upstream of Putney Bridge. The course distance is 4 miles and 374 yards (6,779 m), as measured along the centre of the river's stream.

Races are always rowed in the same direction as the tide: from Mortlake to Putney on an ebb tide or from Putney to Mortlake on a flood tide.

Since the Boat Race moved to this course in 1845, it has always been raced on a flood tide from Putney to Mortlake except in 1846, 1856 and 1863. The Wingfield Sculls is also raced from Putney to Mortlake. Most other events race on an ebb tide from Mortlake to Putney.

In April 1869, the Harvard University Boat Club challenged the Oxford University Boat Club to an "International University Boat-Race" of coxed fours on the Boat Race course. The race took place on 27 August 1869 and was narrowly won by Oxford. The new Atlantic cable allowed daily reports to be received by all major newspapers across America within 23 minutes of the finish. U.S. public interest in the event was huge, with more publicity than any sporting event to date, and within two years of the event the "newly awakened interest in rowing at many of the most noted seats of learning" doubled the number of boat clubs in the US, and led to the formation of the Rowing Association of American Colleges.

== Landmarks ==
Described as an iconic course, the principal landmarks, often used when racing, include (in order from Mortlake to Putney):

Landmark	Bank	Coordinates	Comments
The University Stone	South	51.472861°N 0.268151°W	Marked by a post on the north bank opposite the stone on the south bank, the finish of the Boat Race and the start of the Head of the River race. Just downstream of Chiswick Bridge.
Stag Brewery	South	51.470474°N 0.266376°W	Previously owned by Watneys, and later by Anheuser-Busch, the brewery closed in December 2015 and is now earmarked for residential development.
Barnes Railway Bridge	n/a	51.472736°N 0.253758°W	When racing, crews must pass through the centre arch.
The Bandstand	North	51.476572°N 0.252149°W	
The Crossing	n/a	51.47879°N 0.250583°W	Marks the start of the long Surrey bend.
Chiswick Pier	North	51.482452°N 0.250937°W	
Chiswick Steps	South	51.484581°N 0.247463°W	Steps for the ferry which used to run across to the slipway in front of St Nicholas' Church on the North side.
Chiswick Eyot	North	51.487596°N 0.245814°W	An uninhabited river island. There is a channel behind (north of) the eyot navigable at high tide, but it is never used for racing.
Fuller's Brewery	North	51.487182°N 0.250411°W	Just visible to crews, behind the eyot.
St Paul's School	South	51.488983°N 0.235855°W	
Hammersmith Bridge	n/a	51.488129°N 0.230536°W	Coxes use a particular lamp-post that shows the deepest part of the river and therefore the fastest line.
Harrods Furniture Depository	South	51.484633°N 0.227956°W	Previously the warehouse for the famous shop, now apartments.
The Crabtree	North	51.482041°N 0.223482°W	A pub.
The Mile Post	South	51.47852°N 0.226987°W	A stone obelisk forming a memorial to Steve Fairbairn, founder of the Head of the River Race. It was erected by members of Jesus College Boat Club (Cambridge), Thames Rowing Club and London Rowing Club and is precisely a mile from the Putney stone marking the end of the course.
Fulham Football Club	North	51.474895°N 0.221655°W	The stadium is known as 'Craven Cottage': crews stay wide round the bend as the area in front of the ground is shallow, with slack water.
The Black Buoy	South	51.471211°N 0.221132°W	The large buoy marks the start of the area of the Putney Boat Houses. It has a reputation for ensnaring inexperienced crews when there is a fast ebb tide, for example during the various Head of the River races.
The Putney Stone	South	51.467319°N 0.213756°W	The University Stone lies on the south bank, marking the end of the Championship Course and the start of the Boat Race, just upstream of Putney Bridge.

== Events ==
- Boustead Cup (February/March)
- Women's Eights Head of the River Race (March)
- Schools' Head of the River Race (March)
- Head of the River Race (March/April)
- Veterans Head (March)
- The Boat Races – The Boat Race, Women's Boat Race and The Lightweight Boat Races (March/April)
- Wingfield Sculls (October/November)
- Pairs Head of the River (rowed as far as Harrods) (October)
- Head of the River Fours (November)
- Veteran Fours Head of the River (November)
- Scullers Head (November/December)

== Rowing clubs along the course ==
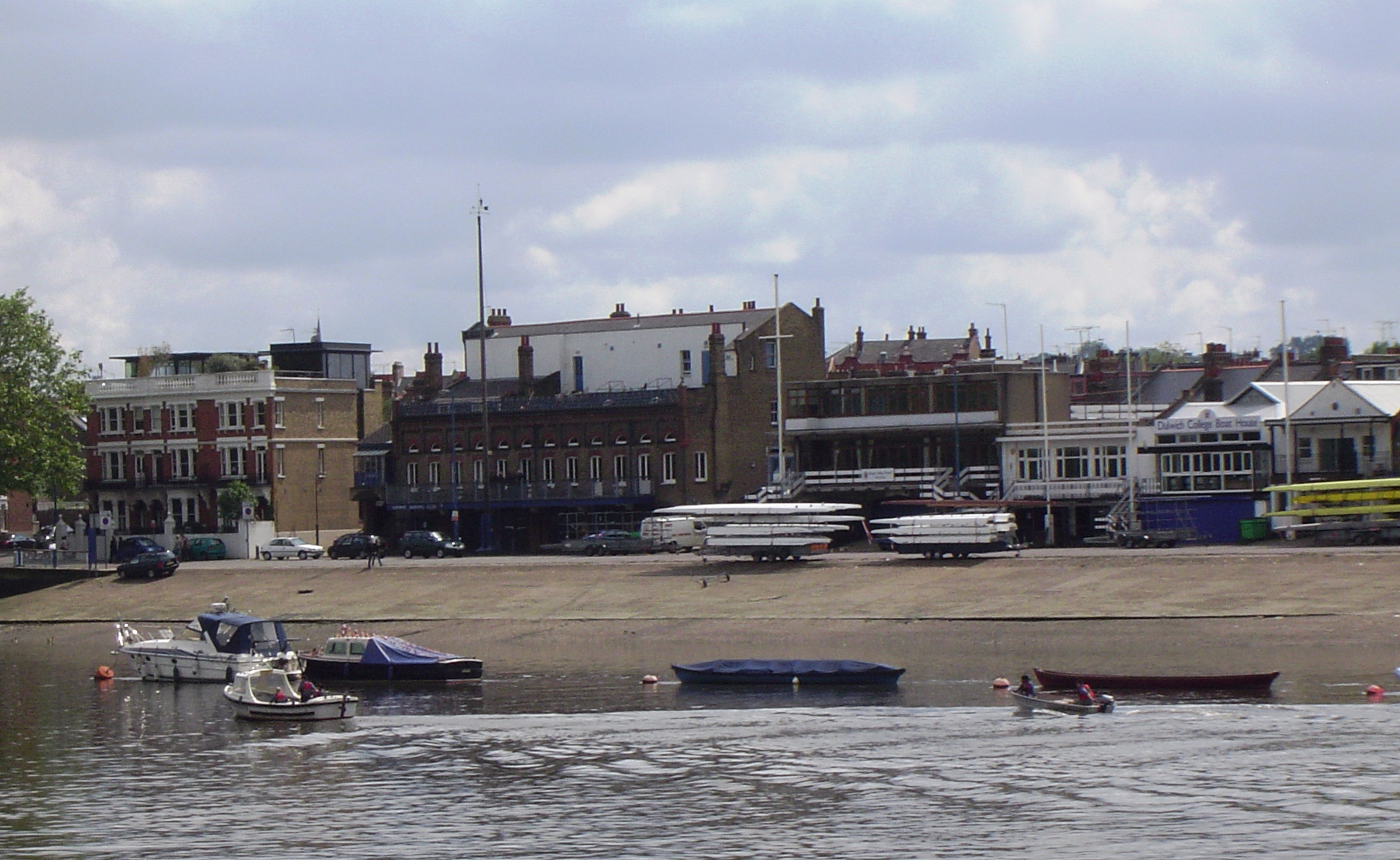
Boat houses on the river bank near Putney

- Tideway Scullers School
- Thames Tradesmen's Rowing Club
- Emanuel School Boat Club
- Cygnet Rowing Club
- Barnes Bridge Ladies Rowing Club
- Sons of the Thames Rowing Club
- Latymer Upper School Boat Club
- Furnivall Sculling Club
- St Paul's School Boat Club
- Auriol Kensington Rowing Club
- Nautilus Rowing Club (British Rowing headquarters)
- Fulham Reach Boat Club
- Barn Elms Rowing Club
- Parr's Priory Rowing Club
- Imperial College Boat Club
- Thames Rowing Club
- Vesta Rowing Club
- Crabtree Boat Club
- King's College School Boat Club
- Dulwich College Boat Club
- Harrodian School Boat Club
- Westminster School Boat Club
- HSBC Rowing Club
- London Rowing Club
- Putney High School Boat Club
- The London Oratory School Boat Club

== See also ==
- Rowing on the River Thames
- University Boat Race Stones
