= Rowing on the River Thames =

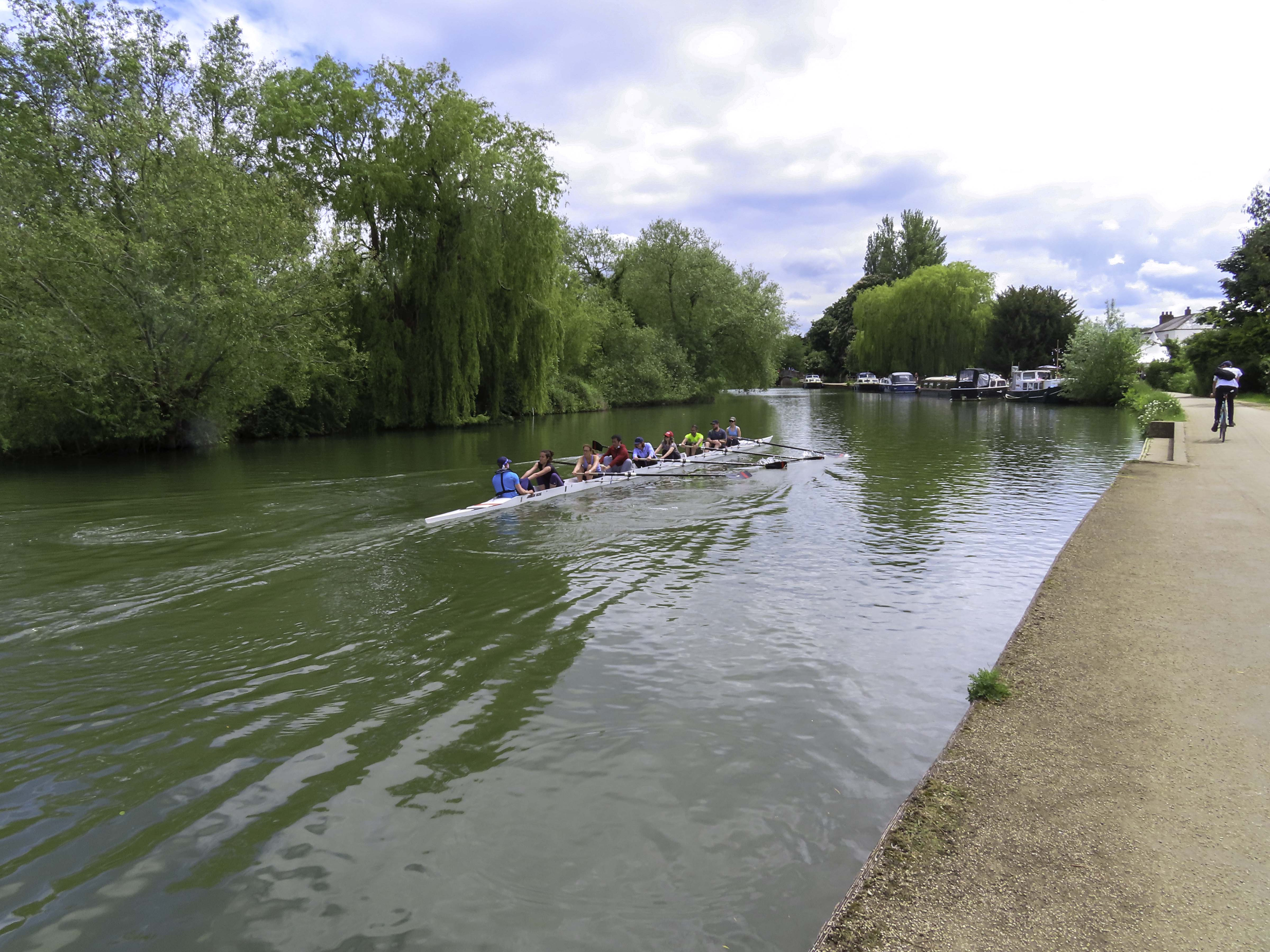
A rowing eight on the Thames in Oxford

The Thames is one of the main rowing rivers of Europe. Several annual competitions are held along its course, including the Henley Royal Regatta, The Boat Race and other long-distance events, called Head of the River races (Heads).

As well as the events held on the river itself, there are other, purpose-built rowing facilities along the course of the river, such as Dorney Lake between Slough and Windsor, Berkshire, which was a 2012 Summer Olympic venue and is now an international Cup, standard-distance rowing lake hosting the three main annual entry regattas for Henley: still named Marlow (International), Wallingford and Metropolitan. Other rowing lakes near the Thames are the Redgrave Pinsent Rowing Lake between Reading and Henley used by the Great Britain squad and Royal Albert Dock near North Woolwich, London.

== History ==
Rowing races on the River Thames have been documented as early as 1725, and Henley-on-Thames was the venue for the 1908 London Olympics rowing races.

=== Contemporary events, groups and modern history ===
The sport and recreational/touring rowing takes place on the Tideway and on the 45 separate lock reaches on the non-tidal section.

The river hosts a televised succession of races on which bets are placed – traditionally named The Boat Race and for some decades a men-only event – it is now the (Oxford and Cambridge) Men's and Women's Boat Race on the cusp of March and April. Further up-river, the Henley Royal Regatta, held over six days (Tuesday to Sunday) ending on the first weekend in July is one of several other rowing events held along approximately the same course on that same stretch of the Thames.

At least 12 head races are held every year on the long, tidal course of the Boat Race, known as the Championship Course – including the Head of the River Race which is the weekend before the Boat Race, attracting hundreds of racing shell eights. Head races are, by definition, long time trials. Twice as many heads are held on long, narrower reaches of the canalised inland river. Many clubs and a few schools and village fair committees as far inland as Oxford host shorter races – regattas – in warmer months.

Event-raced, self-propelled boats on the Thames chiefly comprise (Olympic) racing shells. Most events are for racing shells.

=== Traditional rowing boats ===
A Thames, or English, punt is a long slender vessel. It sees very few and often intermittent or extremely local races. Its use is almost wholly recreational. Thames skiffs are the mainstay of several regattas and six extant clubs (see below). A large version with a canvas is called a camping skiff, featuring in major modern travelogues and historically in Three Men in a Boat, published in 1889, a humorous account by English writer Jerome K. Jerome of a two-week boating holiday on this river from Kingston upon Thames to Oxford and back to Kingston. Other rowing typically takes place in dragon boats, dongolas, dinghies, inflatable rafts and larger skiffs known as cutters.

== Regattas ==
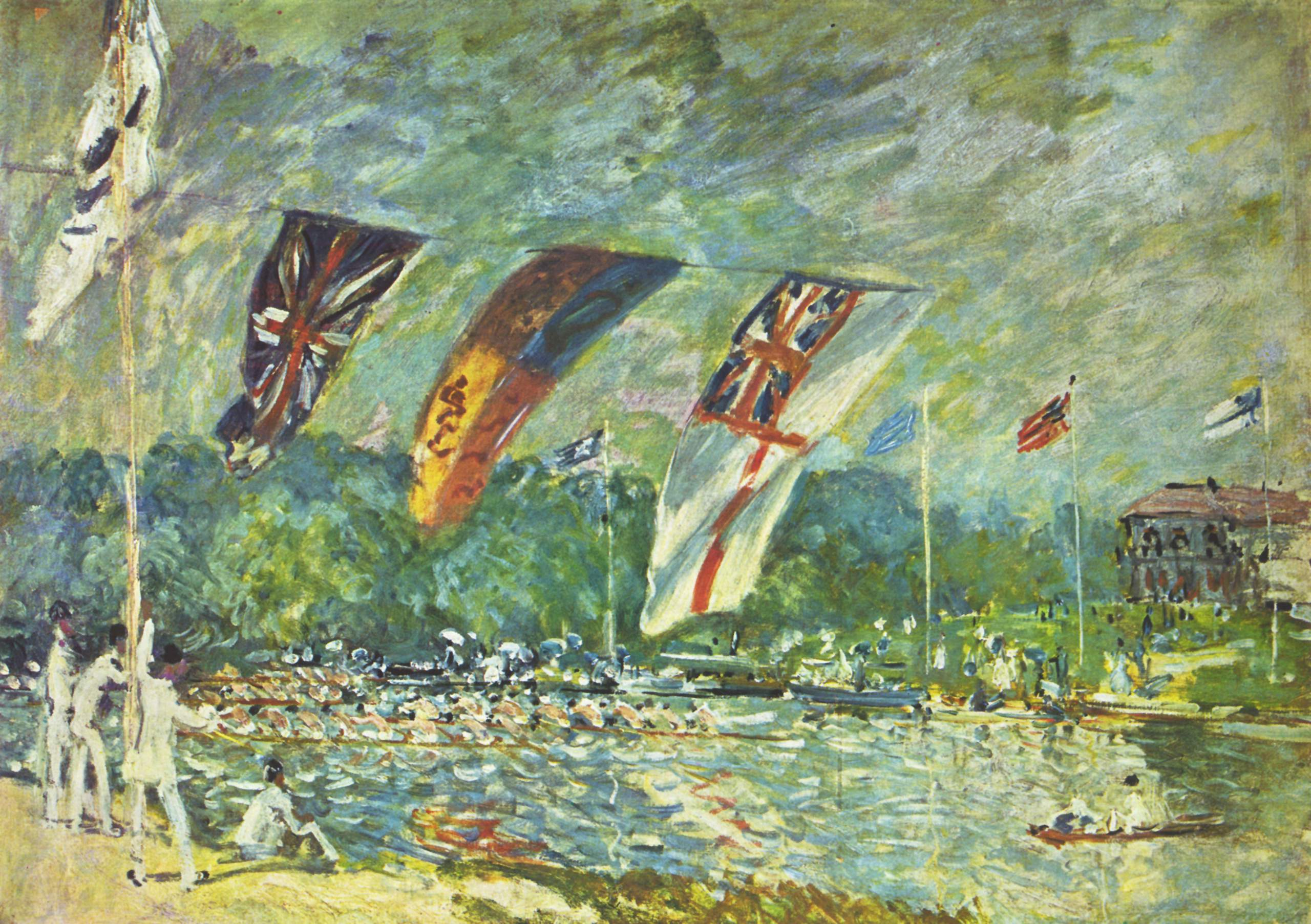
Alfred Sisley's Regatta at Molesey (1874)

Thames rowing regattas are almost all between April and the first week of September. All but the most prestigious are considered short. They are raced side-by-side. They are in categories for competitors and boat types: each consists of heats (mostly knock-out tournaments, that is, without repechages) and final. Many regatta days are split into two or more divisions so that competitors can enter two categories – such as a large and small boat, sweep-oar or sculling. Where category events have a cup it belongs to the regatta and is sometimes engraved with winners' club or composite clubs' name (or engraved on metal set around a plinth or set of plinths). Winners receive a medal – or tankard, called by rowers a "pot". A regatta in racing shell rowing has umpires/stewards who enforce preparedness (race registration, safety and marshalling time/location rules), false start and lane rules using a motor launch and the wearing of club kit.

Event	Special	Month	Place or Reach above...	Approx. start point	Direction	Distance
Chertsey Regatta	Skiffing	07	Shepperton Lock	Dumsey Meadow	Down	500 m
Egham Regatta		06	Bell Weir Lock	Bell Weir	Up	650 m
Hampton Court and Dittons Regatta	Skiffing	07	Teddington Lock	River Mole	Down	650 m
Henley Royal Regatta		07	Hambleden Lock	Temple Island	Up	2112 m
Henley Women's Regatta	Ladies	06	Hambleden Lock	Temple Island	Up	1500 m
Kingston Regatta		07	Teddington Lock	Raven's Ait	Down	1000 m
Maidenhead Regatta		08	Bray Lock	Maidenhead Railway Bridge	Up	500 m
Marlow Regatta		06	Dorney Lake		Still	2000 m
Marlow Town Regatta		06	Marlow Lock	Bisham Abbey	Down	900 m
Metropolitan Regatta		05/06	Dorney Lake		Still	2000 m
Reading Amateur Regatta		06	Caversham Lock	St Mary's Island	Down	1500 m
Reading Town Regatta	Thames Valley Park bank	06	Sonning Lock		Up	800 m
Skiff Championships Regatta	Skiffing	08	Hambleden Lock	Henley on Thames	Down	750 m
Sonning Regatta	General (no racing shells)	05, biennial	Sonning Lock	Sonning Eye bank above lock	Either	300 m approx
Staines Regatta		07	Penton Hook Lock	South of Saint Peter's Church	Down	500 m
Sunbury Amateur Regatta	General (rarely has racing shell J1x)	08	Molesey Lock	Sunbury Court Island	Up	650 m
Thames Ditton Regatta		05	Teddington Lock	By Thames Ditton Island	Up	920 m
Thames Valley Park Regatta		06	Sonning Lock		Up	500 m
Wallingford Regatta		05	Dorney Lake		Still	2000 m
Wargrave and Shiplake Regatta	General (no racing shells)	08	Marsh Lock	Shiplake Railway Bridge	Down	400 m

"General" refers to a mix of skiffing, cutters, dinghies and other rowed craft.

== Head of the River and long-distance events ==
Head of the River races (Heads) and other long-distance events dominate the winter months, and are usually processional (time trials): competitors set off at time intervals, and results are on the basis of comparative timing or by bumping (catching up the boat in front). Many of them on the Tideway are raced over The Championship Course, and apart from the Boat Race and Wingfield Sculls, may begin from Mortlake (west) or Putney (east) whichever tide matches the middle of the day or other central racing hours.

Event	Special	Month	Area or Lock Reach	Approx. start point	Direction	Distance
Eights Week	University of Oxford	05	Iffley Lock		Up	
Hammersmith Head		03	Tideway	Chiswick Bridge	Down	4425 m
Head of the River Fours (the Fours Head)		11	Tideway	Championship Course	Either	6800 m
Head of the River Race (the)		03	Tideway	Championship Course	Either	6800 m
Reading University Head of the River		02/03	Caversham Lock	The Roebuck Hotel, Tilehurst	Down	4500 m
Schools' Head of the River Race	Junior	03	Tideway	Championship Course	Either	6800 m
Torpids	University of Oxford	03	Iffley Lock		Up	
Vesta Veterans International VIIIs Head of River	Masters	03	Tideway	Championship Course	Either	6800 m
(Vesta/the) Scullers Head of River		09	Tideway	Championship Course	Either	6800 m
Wingfield Sculls		10	Tideway	Putney	With the flood tide	6800 m
Women's Head	Ladies	03	Tideway	Championship Course	Either	6500 m

== Other events ==
- The Boat Race
- Women's Boat Race
- Henley Boat Races
- Doggett's Coat and Badge
- Great River Race

== Clubs ==
Rowing on the river is generally organised through clubs based on the Thames, which include the following.

=== Competing many times per year ===
- Abingdon Rowing Club
- Auriol Kensington Rowing Club^{H}
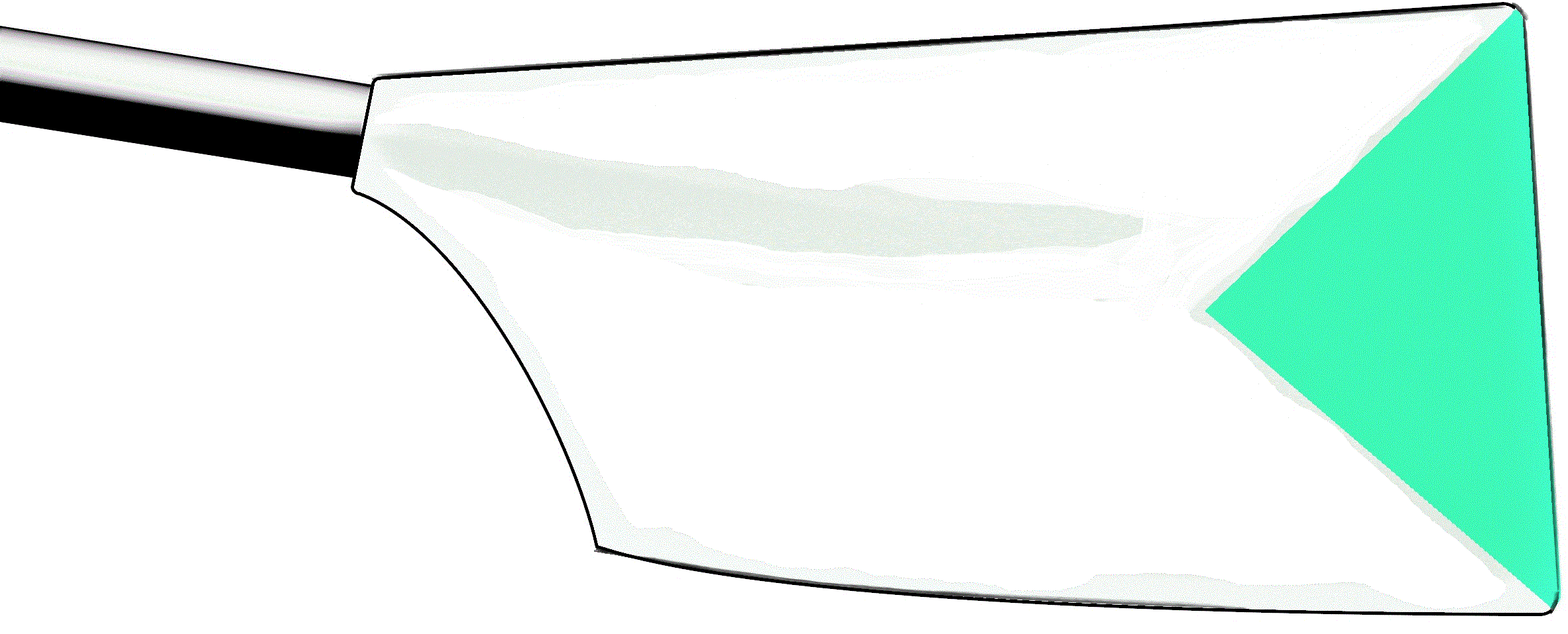
- Barn Elms Rowing Club
- Barnes Bridge Ladies Rowing Club^{Ch}
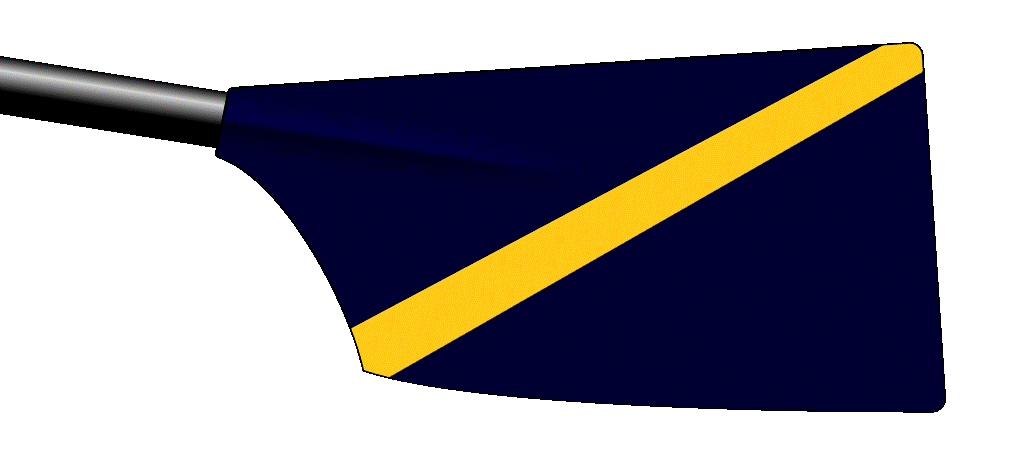
- Burway Rowing Club, (Laleham)
- City of Oxford Rowing Club
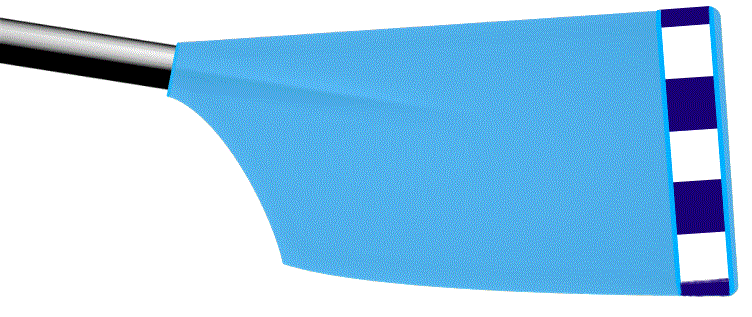
- Curlew Rowing Club^{G}
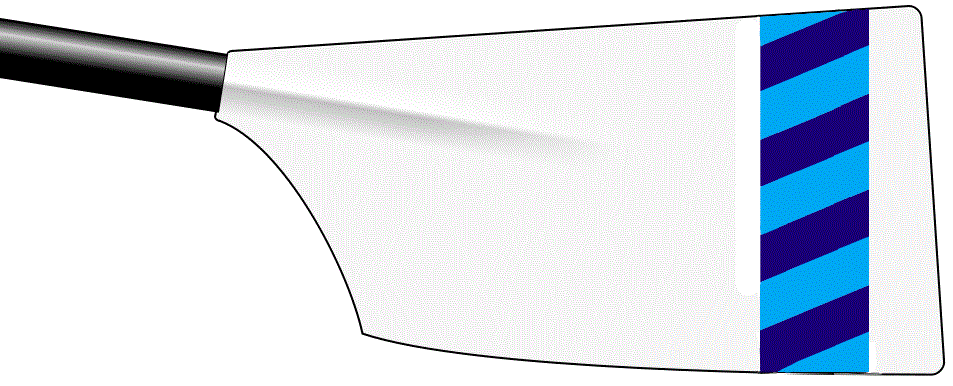
- Cygnet Rowing Club^{Ch}
- East India Club Rowing Section^{Ch}
- Eton Excelsior Rowing Club
- Falcon Boat Club (Oxford)
- Fulham Reach Boat Club
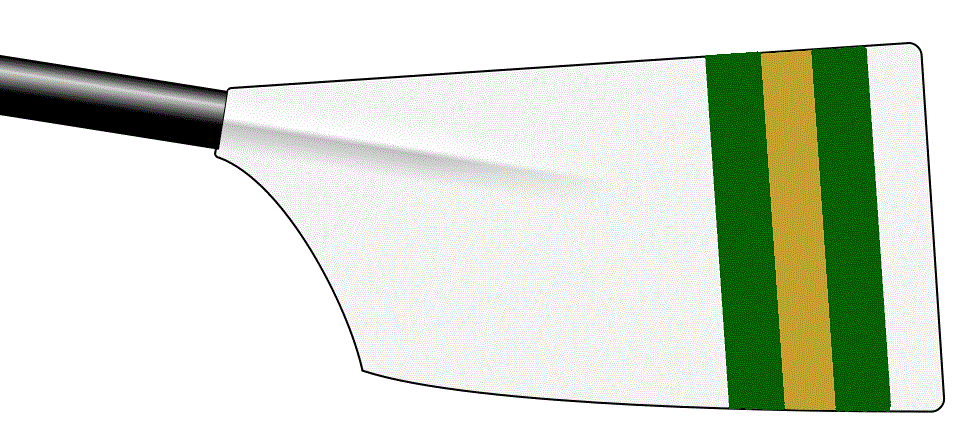
- Furnivall Sculling Club^{H}
- Globe Rowing Club^{G}
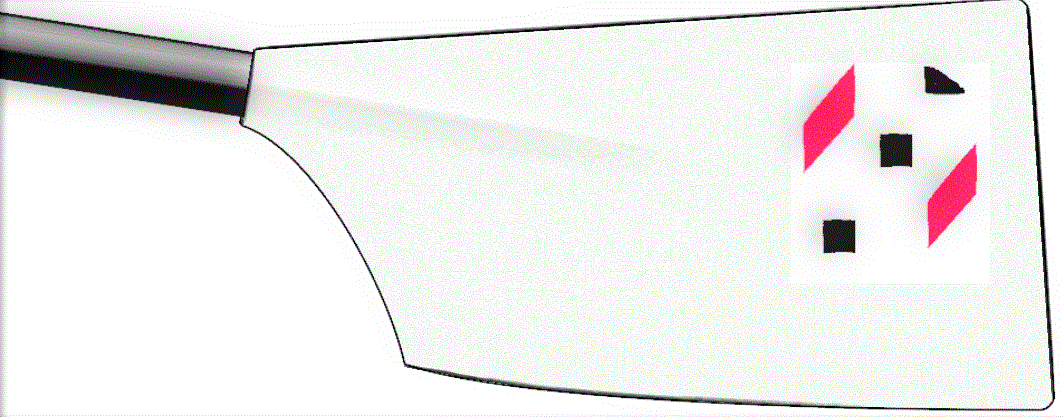
- Goring Gap Rowing Club
- Henley Rowing Club
- HSBC Rowing Club
- Kingston Rowing Club
- Leander Club
- London Rowing Club
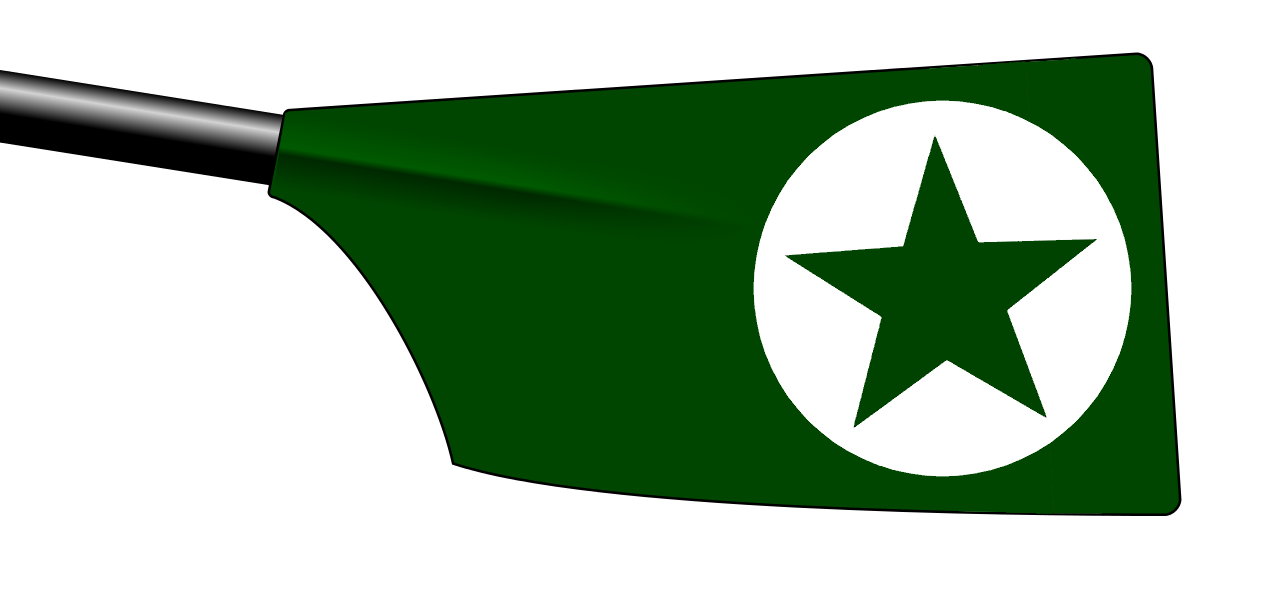
- Maidenhead Rowing Club
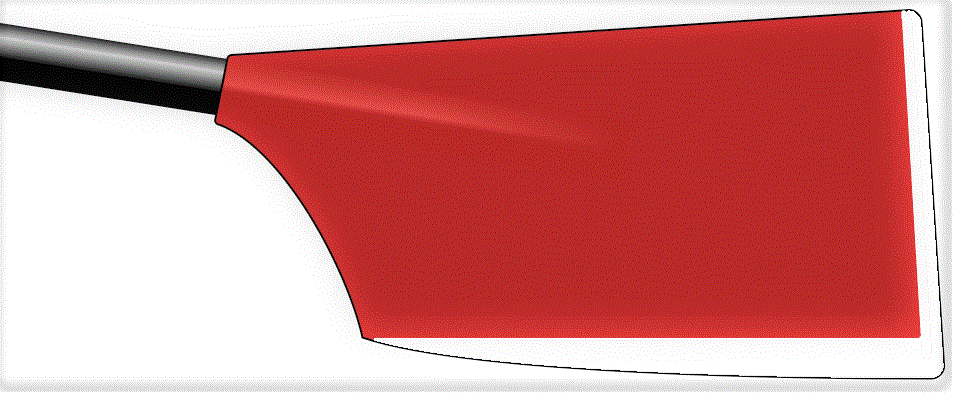
- Marlow Rowing Club
- Molesey Boat Club
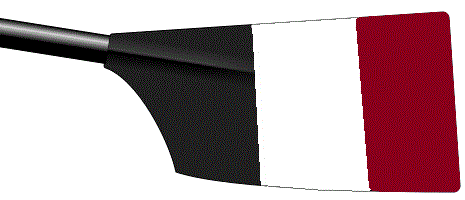
- Mortlake Anglian & Alpha Boat Club^{Ch}
- Parr's Priory Rowing Club
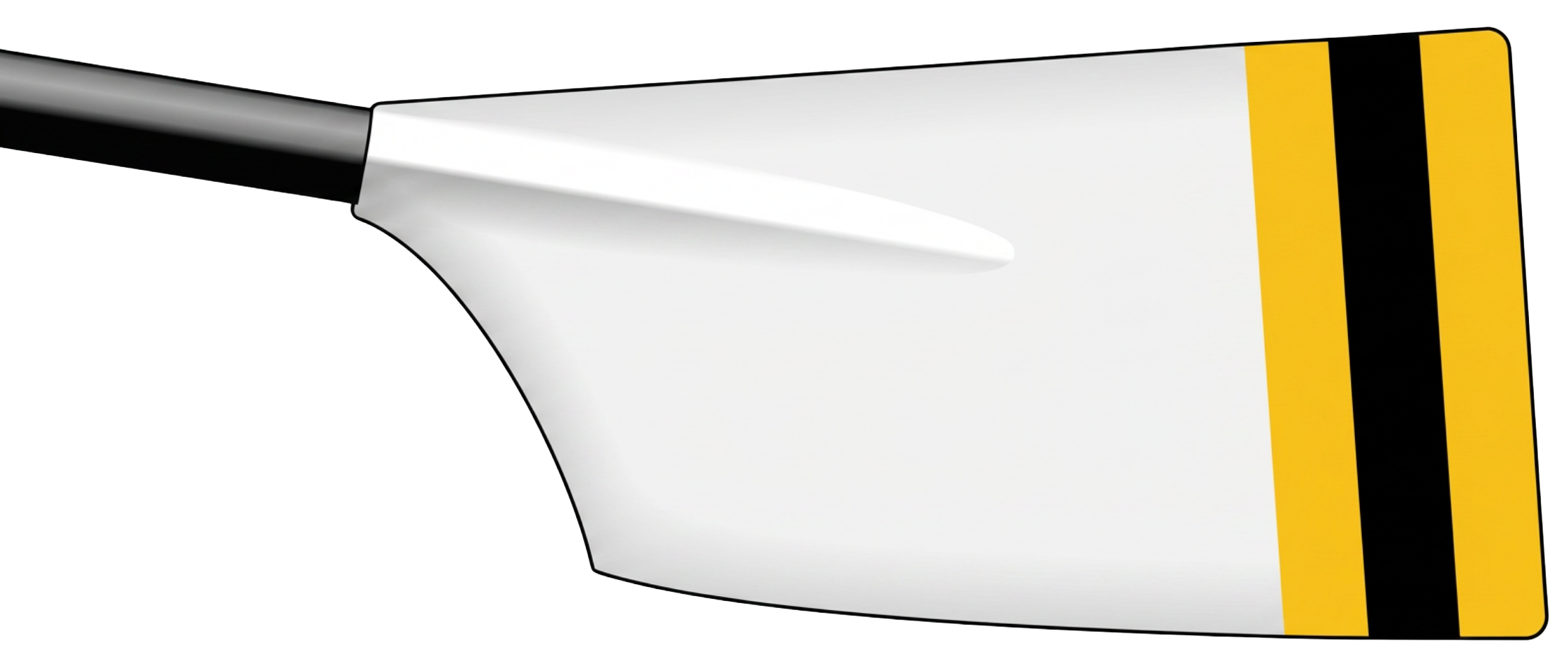
- Poplar Blackwall and District Rowing Club
- Putney Town Rowing Club^{M}
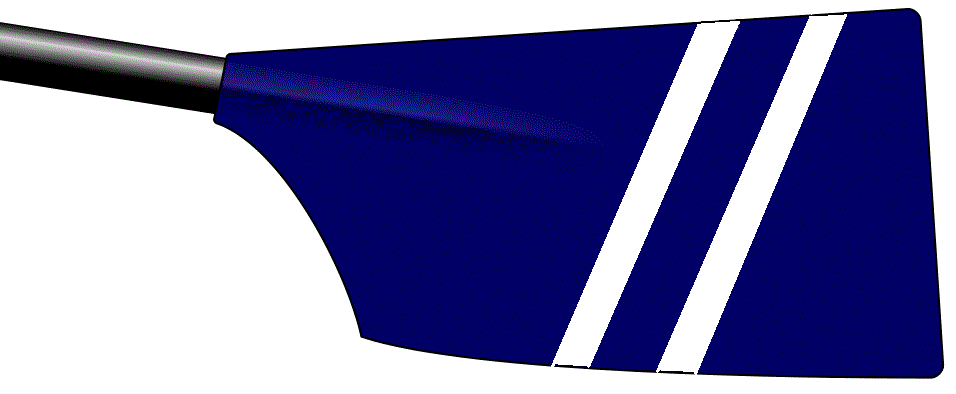
- Quintin Boat Club^{Ch}
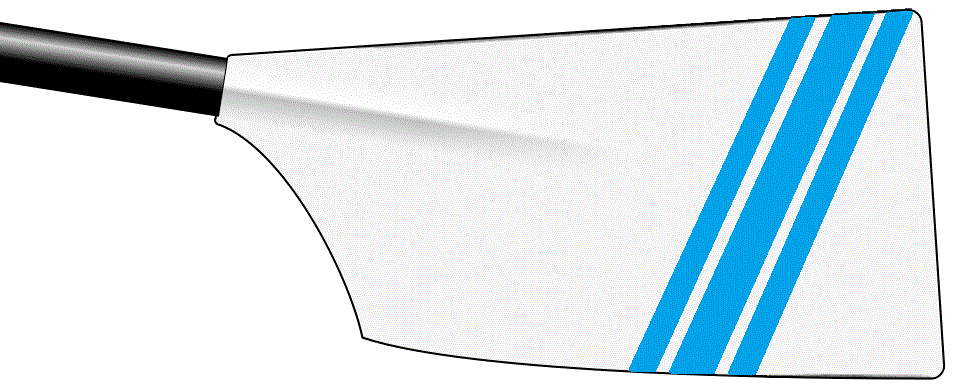
- Reading Rowing Club
- Sons of the Thames^{H}
- Staines Boat Club
- Thames Rowing Club
- Thames Tradesmen's Rowing Club^{Ch}
- Tideway Scullers School^{Ch}
- Twickenham Rowing Club
- Upper Thames Rowing Club
- Vesta Rowing Club
- Walbrook Rowing Club, (Teddington)
- Wallingford Rowing Club
- Walton Rowing Club
- Weybridge Ladies ARC
- Weybridge Rowing Club

Superscript key:

- ^{G}: in Greenwich
- ^{H}: in Hammersmith
- ^{M}: in Mortlake
- ^{Ch}: in Chiswick (Note: Cygnet & BBL share premises)

=== Universities ===
- Imperial College Boat Club
  - Imperial College School of Medicine Boat Club
- Kingston Student Rowing Club (formerly Kingston University Boat Club )
- Oxford Brookes University Boat Club
- Oxford University Boat Club
- Reading University Boat Club
- University of London Boat Club
  - King's College London Boat Club
  - Queen Mary, University of London Boat Club
  - Royal Free and University College Medical School Boat Club
  - Royal Veterinary College Boat Club
  - St Bartholomew's and The Royal London Hospitals' Boat Club
  - St George's Hospital Medical School Boat Club
  - United Hospitals Boat Club
  - University College London Boat Club

=== Schools ===
- Abingdon School Boat Club
- Emanuel School Boat Club
- Eton College Boat Club
- Great Marlow School Boat Club
- Hampton School Boat Club
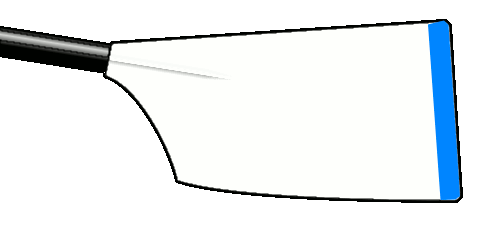
- Headington School Oxford Boat Club
- King's College School Boat Club
- Kingston Grammar School Boat Club
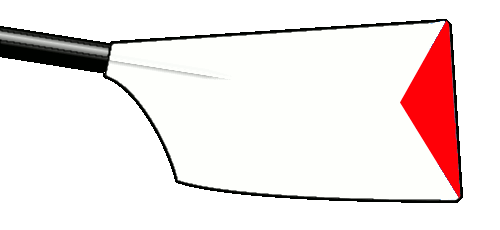
- Lady Eleanor Holles School Boat Club
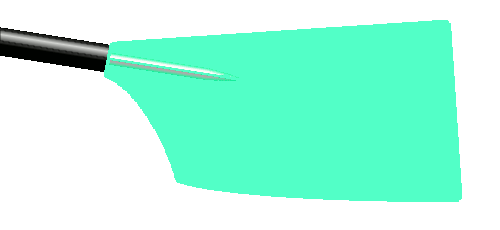
- Latymer Upper School Boat Club
- Pangbourne College Boat Club
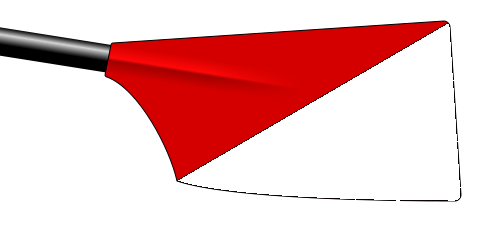
- Radley College Boat Club
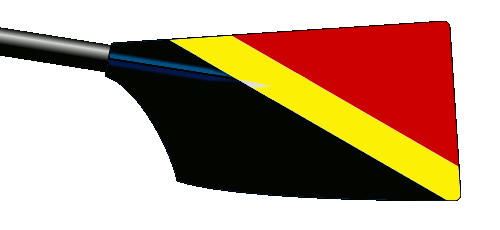
- Shiplake College Boat Club
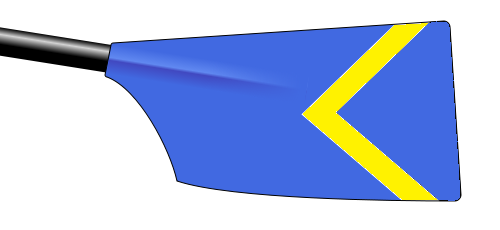
- St Edward's School Boat Club
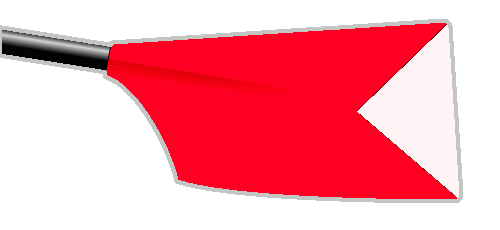
- St George's College
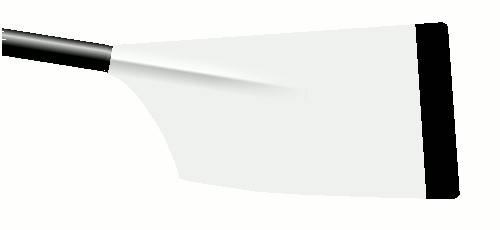
- St Paul's and St Paul's Girls' School Boat Clubs
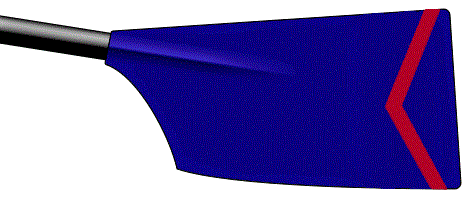
- Sir William Borlase's Grammar School Boat Club
- Sir William Perkins's School Boat Club
- Tiffin School Boat Club
- Westminster School Boat Club
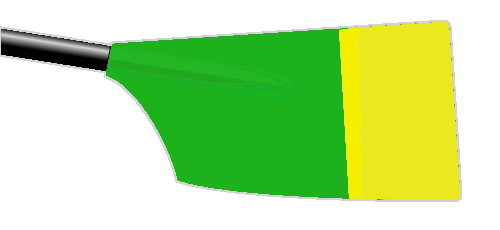
- Windsor Boys' School Boat Club

== Bibliography ==
As to currently competing clubs:

- The Umpires' Handbook British Rowing, 2020: pp. 47–52.
