= John Marsden (rower) =

English rower

Arthur John Marsden (4 September 1915 – 21 February 2004) was an English rower, intelligence officer and teacher. He won the Wingfield Sculls, officially the Amateur Sculling Championship of England, in 1956.

Marsden was the son of Reginald Edward Marsden and his wife Vere Mary (née Dillon). He was born at Dehra Dun in India, where his father, who later joined the Eton mathematics staff, was then a Forest Officer. Marsden was educated at St Cyprian's School, Eastbourne and Eton where he won the pulling and the sculling events as well as the mile, the half-mile and the steeplechase. On leaving Eton he wanted to return to teach modern languages, but was turned down because he did not have a degree. He spent four years studying for a doctorate from the University of Bonn and returned with fluency in German and French as well as good Italian, Spanish and Norwegian. He was successful at his second interview at Eton in 1938.

Marsden was an officer in the school Corps and so had a Territorial commission. In World War II, he joined the Army early in 1940. As an expert linguist, he was assigned to Intelligence, taking part in the Lofoten Islands raid, being parachuted into Africa, and working behind enemy lines in Italy, where he parachuted into the Polis. He became a Lieutenant-Colonel and commanded an independent unit working with Dwight Eisenhower's staff for the D-Day landings. As this unit had its own aircraft, Marsden qualified as a pilot. He was mentioned in dispatches and awarded the Croix de Guerre with Palms by General de Gaulle, and the American Bronze Star.

After the war, he returned to teach at Eton and in 1954 took over as Master in House from Harry Babington Smith. He joined Vesta Rowing Club and drove regularly to Putney to train for the Wingfield Sculls. He had covered 3,000 miles on the water before his first attempt at the title and won it at his fifth attempt in 1956, aged 41. Two years earlier, in 1954, he and his partner Tony Fox, astonished the rowing world by beating the Russian silver medallists in the Double Sculls at Henley Royal Regatta. He had beaten Sous, twice winner of the Diamond Sculls, in the first tideway Scullers Head earlier that year.

Marsden was retired early from his house at Eton, then becoming first a stockbroker and then a farmer. However he returned to teaching as Director of Studies at a London tutorial college where continued until he was well into his seventies. In 1975, in partnership with Nicholas Browne, he took over the Gibbs Preparatory School at Collingham Gardens and founded Collingham Tutors.

== Family ==
Marsden married on 26 Feb 1944 to Suzanne Mary Boyd (née Cooke), the widow of Arthur N A Boyd, an Eton cricketer who was killed in action in 1940. Marsden and his wife had a son and three daughters
