= Collingham =

Collingham may refer to:

- Collingham, Nottinghamshire
- Collingham, West Yorkshire
- Collingham College
