= University Boat Race Stones =

Rowing markers in London, England

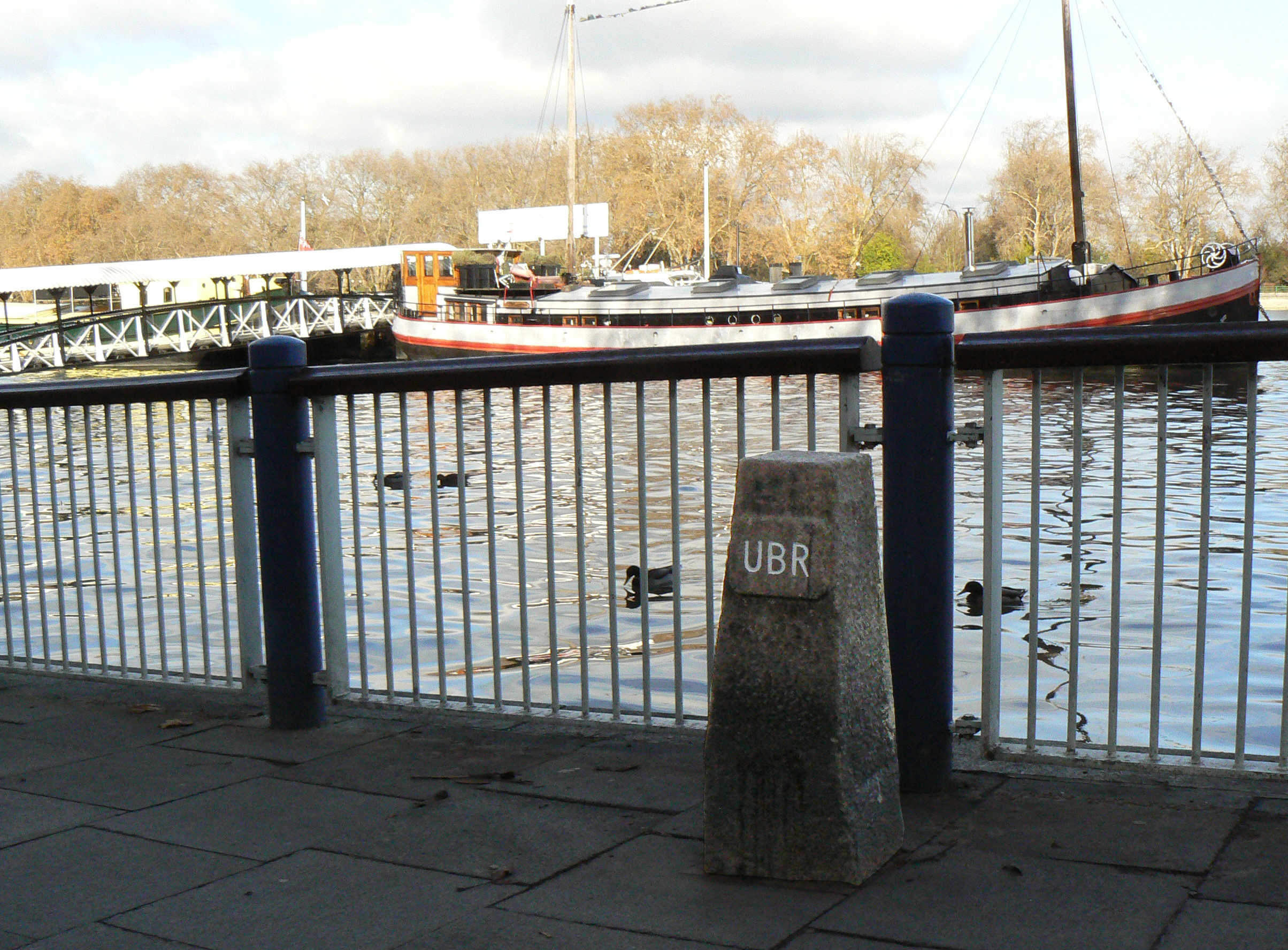
The stone marking the start of the University Boat Race at Putney, with Putney Pier in the background

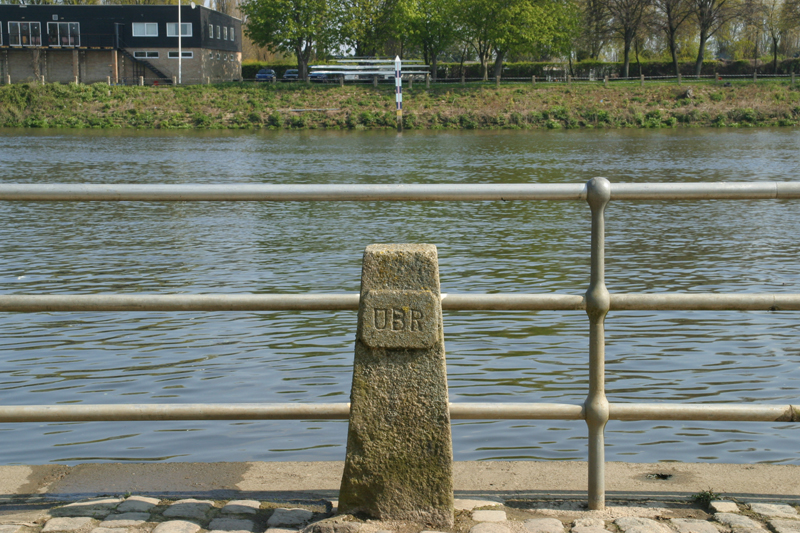
University Boat Race finish, with the stone in the (Surrey) foreground and the finishing post in the (Middlesex) background

Boat Race course ("Middlesex" and "Surrey" denote sides of the Thames Tideway corresponding to the traditional English counties)

The University Boat Race Stones are two tapered, granite cuboids on southern embankments of the Tideway in west London, one 129 metres (423 ft) west of Putney Bridge and the other at Mortlake, 112 metres (367 ft) east of Chiswick Bridge.

The stones define the starting and finishing points of the Championship Course. The course, which is 4 miles and 374 yards (6,779 m) from Putney to Mortlake as measured along the centre of the river, is used for rowing races including the Oxford and Cambridge Boat Race, Women's Boat Race, Lightweight Boat Races, Head of the River Race and other races. The finishing, western stone, is mirrored by a pyramid-topped post (wooden obelisk) across the river, painted in large bands of Oxford and Cambridge blue. The race finishes a few metres short of the rowing club commonly known as "Scullers" or TSS.

They are etched "UBR" for University Boat Race.

Their coordinates are:

- Putney: 51°28.003′N 0°12.916′W
- Mortlake: 51°28.323′N 0°16.148′W

== See also ==
- The Championship Course
