= Head of the River Race =

Annual rowing event for eights in London

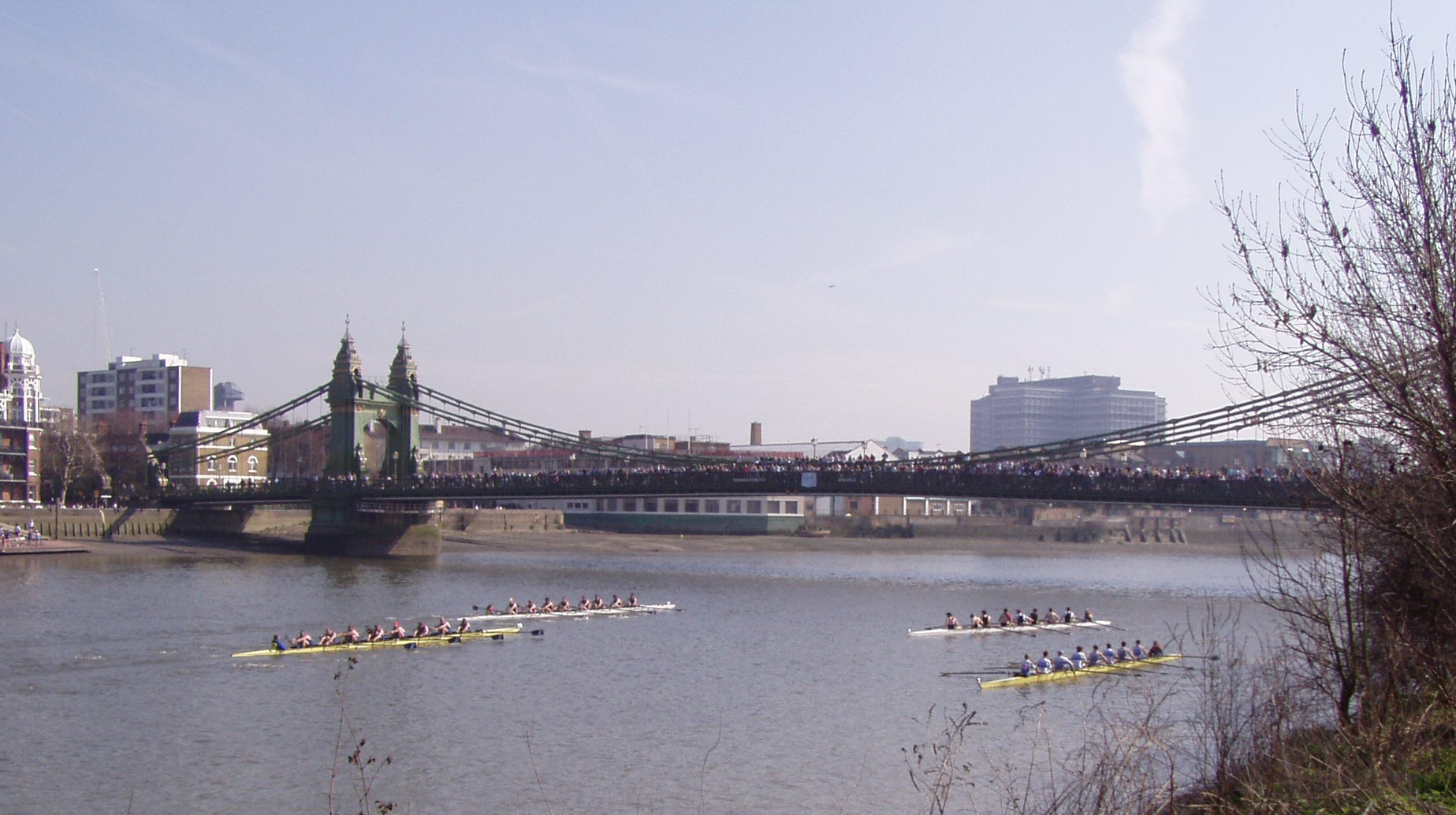
- Crews racing under Hammersmith Bridge at HORR 2005
- Frequency: Annual
- Locations: Championship Course, River Thames in London, England
- Years active: 1925–1936, 1938–1939, 1946–2003, 2005–2006, 2008–2012, 2014–2016, 2018–2019, 2022–
- Previous event: 28 March 2026
- Next event: 20 March 2027
- Participants: approximately 340 to 420 crews
- Organiser: HoRR Committee (Note: The Hon. Secretary presides at Ranelagh Sailing Club, Putney on race day and distributes numbers to all usual Tideway host clubs well in advance of the day, parking attendants limit trailers at Putney, these factors mean clubs, particularly overseas clubs, need to arrange a Tideway host club each year.)
- Website: www.horr.co.uk
- Latest Head Pennant winning crew: Leander Club

The Head of the River Race (HORR) is an against-the-clock ('processional') rowing race for men's eights held annually on the River Thames in London, England; other such races are the Schools' Head of the River Race, Women's Eights Head of the River Race and Veterans' Head of the River Race. Its competitors are, with a few experienced junior exceptions, seniors of UK or overseas clubs and it runs with the ebb tide down the 4.25 mile (6.8 km) Championship Course from Mortlake to Putney which usually one or two weeks later hosts the Oxford and Cambridge head-to-head races.

The race was founded on a much smaller scale, in 1925, by Steve Fairbairn – an influential rower then rowing coach of the early 20th century, who transformed the sport into one involving today's lengthier slides enabling conventional (Fairbairnized) racing shell propulsion.

"My dear boy, you are under a wrong impression. It is not a race, it is merely a means of getting crews to do long rows"

— Steve Fairbairn, founder of the race

== History ==
The race was founded by the rowing coach Steve Fairbairn who was a great believer in the importance of distance training over the winter. "Mileage makes champions" was one of Fairbairn's repeated phrases included in his four volumes on rowing coaching and in other correspondence. He devised the race while coaching at Thames Rowing Club to encourage this form of training and raise the standard of winter training among London clubs. He transformed the sport by introducing a full body and leg-drive catch and introducing sliding seats.

A race proposal meeting followed between the captains of the metropolitan (i.e. London) clubs, who received the idea with great enthusiasm, and it was agreed that the first race would be held on Sunday 12 December 1926. Despite the choice of day of the week, the race went ahead with 23 entries (21 started) at a cost of 5s per crew (equivalent to £13 in 2025).

"So far the ARA were slumbering in sweet ignorance of the horrible fact that racing was taking place on a Sunday. So the Committee bravely fixed Sunday, 27th March as the date for the second race, but the publicity the event had received had drawn the attention of the ARA and at a meeting of the committee on February 19th a letter was read from the ruling body pointing out that it might be necessary to alter the date of the race as the ARA might pass a resolution banning racing on Sundays... The Head of the River Committee agreed to abandon the December race and row one annual race in March or thereabouts on Saturday afternoons."

With the future of the race agreed, the number of entrants steadily rose:

- 1927 — 41 entries, all tideway crews (except two from Jesus College, Cambridge);
- 1928 — 49 crews;
- 1929 — 60 crews;
- 1930 — 77 crews;
- 1936 — 127 crews;
- ... up to 1939 — 154 crews.

There was no race in 1937 (there was no suitable tide on a Saturday and at that time organised competitive sport did not take place on Sundays) nor from 1940 to 1945 inclusive due to the second world war. The event was restarted in 1946 (naturally starting with a smaller number of entrants – 71 crews) and has taken place annually ever since, with the exceptions of 2004, 2007, 2013, and 2017 when the race was cancelled due to bad weather, and 2020 and 2021 due to the COVID-19 pandemic.

As of 2014, London RC have won the race most often, 14 times (all before 1979) followed by Leander Club (in Henley) 13 times. An overtly GB National Squad, usually its eight, have won the race 12 times. The GB National Squad men's eight tends to compete the race and may enter under a temporary club of their choice or what is in any event the main non-international season rowing club where they train that year. Given these past combinations, crews that are partly the GB men's eight have won the race more than 40 times. Overseas entries have claimed the top prize 4 times. The other categories pitch themselves at the top clubs around the UK and the overseas pennant is the main prize nationally only available to overseas winners of any rowing competition.

From 1979 onwards, due to the sheer volume of competitors and for reasons of safety on a relatively small area of river and riverside, the HORR Committee had at that point to impose a limit of 420 crews, which still exists today. Entries are typically required and accepted in January for overseas crews and in February for UK crews.

== Race format ==
The race is for open men's eights and is considered to be the peak of the head race season — attracting the top UK crews as well as foreign clubs. Composite crews, drawn from more than one club or institution, are not permitted.

The Championship Course is that of the Oxford and Cambridge Boat Race but, unlike the Boat Race, the Head of the River Race is raced on an ebb tide from Mortlake to Putney. The starting time for the race is different every year and depends on the tide — the first crew (winner from the previous year) starts the race the next year. Start time is usually about 2 hours after high tide and crews start at about 10 second intervals.

The record time of 16 min 28.4 s was set in 2023 by Oxford Brookes University, beating the 1987 record of 16 min 37 s set by the Great Britain National Squad.

The Race is usually held on the third or fourth Saturday in March each year, depending on tides and the date of the Boat Race. Usually the two events are held on separate days, although in 1987 and 1994, the Boat Race took place in the morning and the Head in the afternoon

Raced over the same course in eights are the Schools' Head of the River Race (SHORR) organised by Westminster School, the Women's Eights Head of the River Race (WEHoRR) and Veterans' Head of the River Race organised by Vesta Rowing Club. In other boats on the same course are raced the Head of the River Fours (HOR4s) sponsored by Fuller's Brewery, the Veterans' Fours Head of the River and the Scullers Head organised by Vesta RC. The Pairs' Head is run over a shorter course from Chiswick Bridge to Hammersmith Bridge. The Veterans' HOR and Pairs HOR sometimes race in the reverse direction if tides do not permit the usual arrangement.

The race has since at least 1990 seen an excess of crews wishing to enter so a few minimum race wins are imposed therefore sometimes for each category, and always for elite and senior categories.

== Trophies ==
Medals are awarded to all 14 categories. Eight trophies are awarded for the fastest crews under these categories:

- Head of the River — bust of Steve Fairbairn, a Head pennant plaque are awarded to the club whose crew returns the fastest time.
- UK-only trophies:
- Vernon Trophy — Karl Vernon presented the first of the three location-based club trophies in 1954 and this is made from the melted-down silver of trophies he won in his own racing career. The trophy is a statuette of the oarsman Jack Beresford (five-time Olympic medallist). Awarded to the fastest club crew normally rowing on the Thames Tideway. (Note: "Club crews" refers to all British Rowing registered clubs except universities, colleges, and schools.)
- Page Trophy — Presented by the Head of the River Committee in memory of J.H. Page and awarded to the fastest club crew normally rowing on the Thames or its tributaries but not on the Tideway.
- Jackson Trophy — instituted by members of Nottingham Britannia RC in 1950, originally as the prize for an annual "County Eights" event between Nottinghamshire and Derbyshire. In 1960 it was presented to The Head of the River Race as the trophy for UK clubs outside of the Thames basin; it was by then in the form of a mounted blade. The 2002 Race saw it won by Nottingham Britannia, who given its many years winners' names arranged with the race organisers a replacement trophy. (Note: A late Victorian rose bowl suitable for engraving)
- Services Pennant — crews from His Majesty's Armed Forces
- Churcher Trophy — university crews of any standard
- Halladay Trophy — university crews at or below Intermediate 2 status, named for Eric Halladay
- Overseas Entrants Trophy — crews from overseas

Eight pennants (large triangular flags), a plaque and individual medals are awarded annually since 2015 to the fastest:

- Senior, IM1, IM2, IM3A (academic), IM3C (club), NoviceA (academic), NoviceC (club) (all UK).
- Lightweight crew (<73.5 kg for each rower) (Overseas or UK).

== Head wins to date ==
Extract from full results on the race organisation's website: (Note: Where first eight of any winning club or organisation no post-nominal (I) is included.)

- 1926 – London RC
- 1927 – London RC and Thames RC (equal times)
- 1928 – London RC
- 1929 – London RC
- 1930 – London RC
- 1931 – London RC
- 1932 – London RC
- 1933 – London RC
- 1934 – London RC
- 1935 – London RC
- 1936 – Thames RC
- 1937 – Race cancelled
- 1938 – Goldie (CUBC)
- 1939 – London RC
- 1940-1945 – No entries permitted. World War II
- 1946 – Imperial College London
- 1947 – Jesus College Cambridge
- 1948 – Thames RC
- 1949 – London RC
- 1950 – London RC
- 1951 – Jesus College Cambridge
- 1952 – Jesus College Cambridge
- 1953 – Thames Rowing Club
- 1954 – Royal Air Force
- 1955 – Thames RC
- 1956 – Thames RC III
- 1957 – Isis (OUBC)
- 1958 – Barn Cottage
- 1959 – Barn Cottage
- 1960 – Barn Cottage
- 1961 – Barn Cottage
- 1962 – Barn Cottage (Note: This mid-1950s Henley club had a brief existence and became the main RAF, particularly RAF Benson club. It also took on Leander members. Among its closing factors, it faced additional and better rival premises on the creation of Upper Thames Rowing Club and was disbanded in the mid-1960s)
- 1963 – University of London BC
- 1964 – Tideway Scullers
- 1965 – Tideway Scullers
- 1966 – Tideway Scullers
- 1967 – Tideway Scullers
- 1968 – Tideway Scullers
- 1969 – Tideway Scullers II
- 1970 – Tideway Scullers
- 1971 – Tideway Scullers
- 1972 – Tideway Scullers II
- 1973 – Leander Club
- 1974 – Tideway Scullers
- 1975 – Great Britain National Squad
- 1976 – Great Britain National Squad
- 1977 – Leander Club
- 1978 – London RC
- 1979 – Great Britain National Squad
- 1980 – Great Britain National Squad II
- 1981 – Thames Tradesmen's Rowing Club
- 1982 – Great Britain National Squad
- 1983 – Thames Tradesmen's Rowing Club
- 1984 – Great Britain National Squad
- 1985 – Great Britain National Squad
- 1986 – Great Britain National Squad
- 1987 – Great Britain National Squad
- 1988 – Great Britain National Squad
- 1989 – Great Britain National Squad
- 1990 – Great Britain National Squad
- 1991 – Leander Club
- 1992 – Molesey BC
- 1993 – RV Münster von 1882 (Note: The German Olympic gold medallists;)
- 1994 – RV Münster von 1882
- 1995 – Netherlands Rowing Federation
- 1996 – Leander Club
- 1997 – Leander Club
- 1998 – Leander Club
- 1999 – Queen's Tower
- 2000 – Queen's Tower
- 2001 – Queen's Tower (Before 2006 only admitted Imperial College Alumni) (Note: Today known as Sport Imperial Boat Club. Restricted entry criteria such as to qualified British Rowing coaches and former UL rowers.)
- 2002 – Leander Club
- 2003 – Leander Club
- 2004 – Race cancelled
- 2005 – Leander Club
- 2006 – Leander Club
- 2007 – Race abandoned (Note: Cambridge University BC was fastest crew in the minority of crews who finished in 2007.)
- 2008 – Leander Club
- 2009 – Tideway Scullers School
- 2010 – Molesey BC

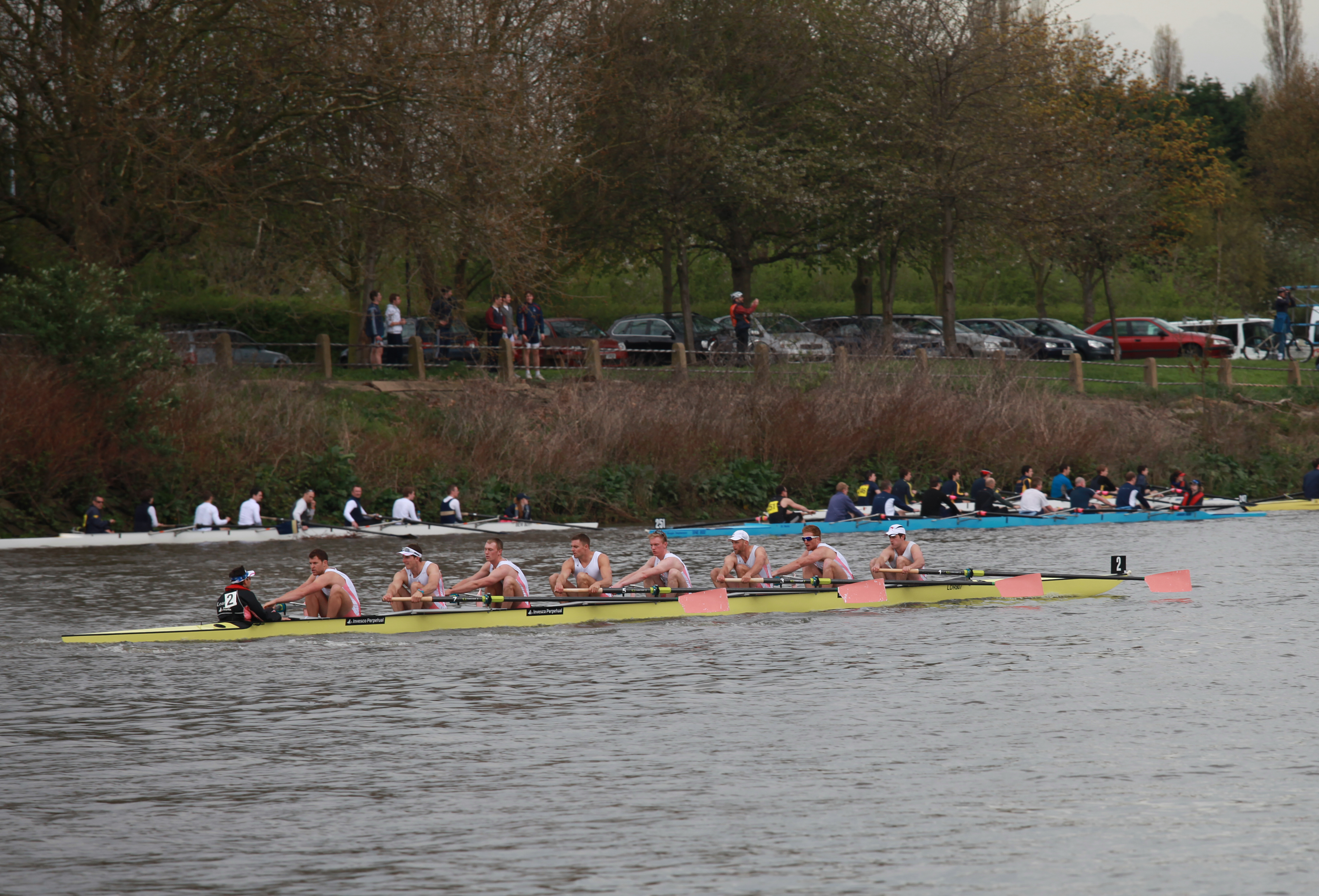
Leander Club first VIII starting the 2011 Tideway Head

- 2011 – Leander Club
- 2012 – Czech Rowing Federation
- 2013 – Race cancelled
- 2014 – Race abandoned (Note: Less than 40 minutes into the race due to unsafe conditions at the finish line. Molesey BC was the fastest crew in the minority of crews who finished in 2014.)
- 2015 – Leander Club
- 2016 - Oxford Brookes University
- 2017 - Race cancelled
- 2018 – Oxford Brookes University + Leander Club (dead heat)
- 2019 – Oxford Brookes University
- 2020 – Race cancelled due to COVID-19 pandemic
- 2021 – Race cancelled due to COVID-19 pandemic
- 2022 - Oxford Brookes University
- 2023 - Oxford Brookes University
- 2024 – Leander Club
- 2025 – Leander Club
- 2026 – Leander Club

== See also ==
- Rowing on the River Thames including
- Head of the River Fours
- Women's Eights Head of the River Race
- Scullers Head of the River Race (single sculls)
- Head of the Charles Regatta (USA)
- Head of the Hooch (USA)
- Head of the River (Australia)
- Schools' Head of the River Race

== Sources ==
- Cleaver, Hylton, A History of Rowing.
- Page, Geoffrey, Hear the Boat Sing — A History of Thames Rowing Club and tideway rowing.
