= Hammersmith Head =

Hammersmith Head is a rowing head held by Auriol Kensington Rowing Club on the River Thames. The race starts at Chiswick Bridge 51°28′23″N 0°16′11″W and finishes at Hammersmith Bridge 51°29′18″N 0°13′49″W (a course of approximately 2.750 miles (4.426 km)). It is held under Amateur Rowing Association Rules of Racing.

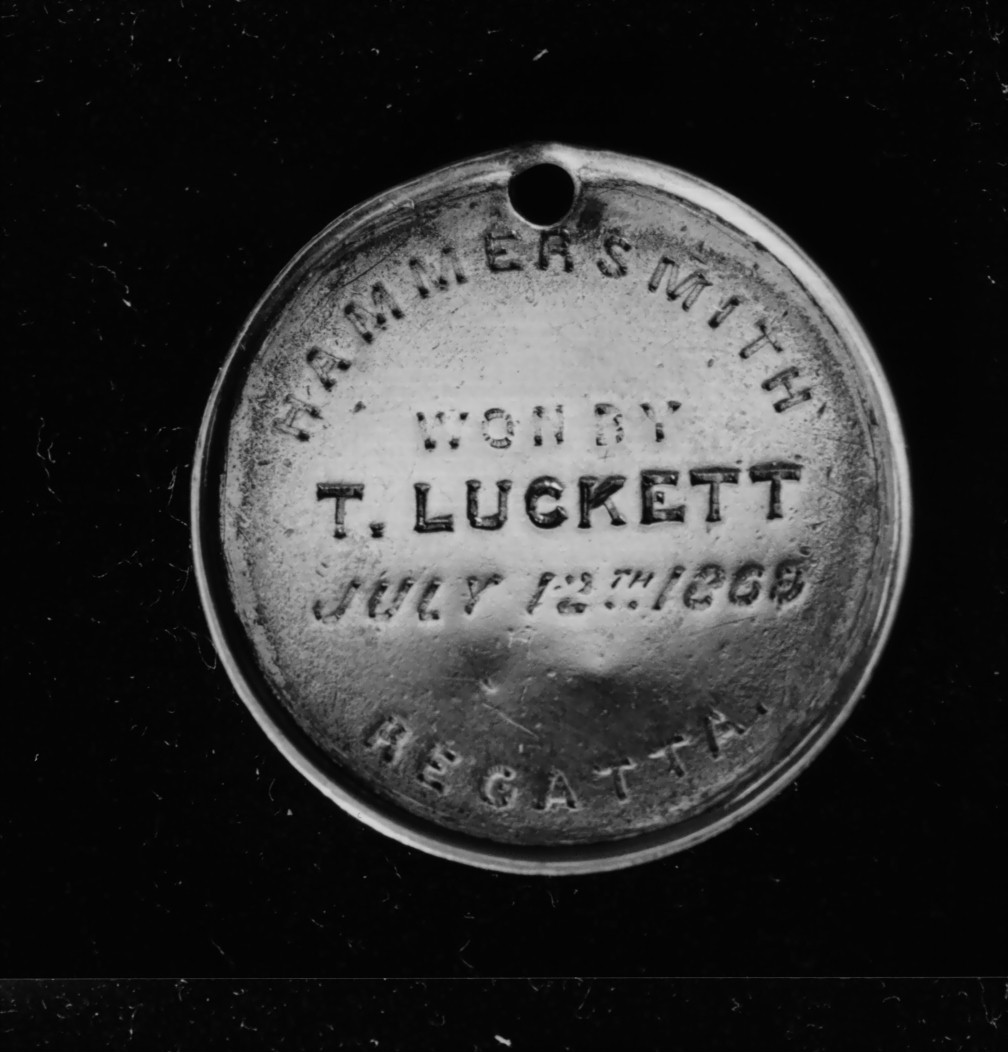
Hammersmith Regatta winner's medal 1896 - Thomas Luckett
