= Barn Elms Rowing Club =

British rowing club

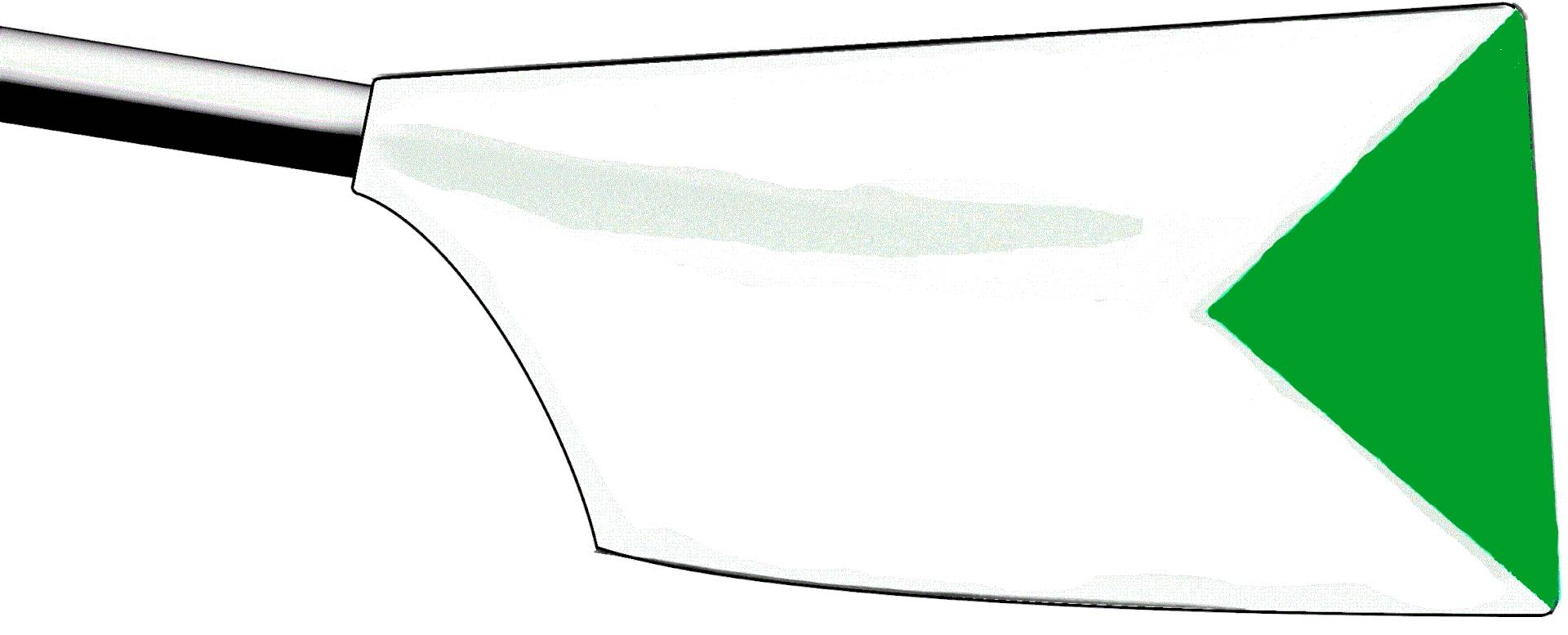
- Location: Barn Elms Boathouse, Queen Elizabeth Walk, (Barnes) London SW13 0DG
- Coordinates: 51.474°N 0.225°W
- Home water: Tideway
- Founded: 1967
- Affiliations: British Rowing boat code: BAE
- Website: www.enablelc.org/bebh/

Barn Elms Rowing Club is a rowing club in the east extreme of Barnes, London, close to Putney. The boathouse is located between Putney and Hammersmith Bridges, forming part of the larger Barn Elms Sports Centre. Opposite it on the river is Craven Cottage, the home of Fulham F.C. The boathouse is shared with Parr's Priory Rowing Club. Activities include beginner courses, juniors and a junior racing squad, adults beginner and intermediate courses, in addition to recreational participation.

== History ==
The origins of the club started with the construction of the London County Council boathouse in the winter of 1959/60 at the cost of £14,000. The facility was used by schoolchildren form London and the club became known as Barn Elms. In 1960, the club featured in the Associated Television programme 'Seeing Sport'. By 1968, the club had the use of an early rowing tank.

In 1991, the London Dragons' Dawn Raiders, which were part of the club had their first major success when winning the British Dragon Boat Racing Association's National Charity Championship.

In recent years the club has had success and won a gold medal at the 2023 British Rowing Junior Championships and 2024 British Rowing Championships, which included winning gold medals in the WJ16 single sculls.

== Honours ==
=== British Championships ===
Year	Winning crew/s
2023	Women J16 1x
2024	Women J16 1x
2025	Women J18 1x

== See also ==
- Rowing on the River Thames
