= Head of the River Fours =

Annual rowing race for fours in London

- Frequency: Annual
- Locations: Championship Course, River Thames in London, England
- Years active: 1955 – present
- Next event: 15 November 2025
- Participants: 480 crews
- Website: fourshead.org

The Fuller's Head of the River Fours (HOR4s) is a processional rowing race held annually on the Tideway of the River Thames in London on the 4 1/4-mile (6.8 km) Championship Course from Mortlake to Putney.

== History ==
The idea for a Tradesmen's Tideway Head Race for fours, was first mooted in the early 1950s by the Thames Amateur Rowing Association (the TARA). (Note: This was the Thames branch of the National Amateur Rowing Association, the governing body formed of manual workers who could not join the ARA (which did not recognise their amateur status, maintaining until the late 1960s in some international events that rowing was a good sport for non-manual workers but that they could be put at a disadvantage if racing against those who worked outdoors in physically demanding work.) NARA's existence reflected demand from such men and women too to compete in the sport, many of whom were drawn to the sport by living near a busy river.)

After picking a date for the new race the TARA dropped their plans after learning that the Tradesmen's Rowing Clubs Association had also started to organise a similar open fours race. (Note: A similar organisation formed of riverine and canal-based professionals such as hired watermen, point-to-point ferrymen, bargemen and boat repairers and all others who worked with boats full-time.)

Thus the fledgling "Head of the River 4s" was first raced in 1955. In the following years the race was known as the Tradesmen's Rowing Clubs' Association Head of the River Fours, though even at this stage ARA clubs were entering along with NARA and TRCA clubs.

In the late 1950s the ARA and NARA finally merged into the Amateur Rowing Association of Great Britain. The event then became known simply as the Head of the River Fours, and was handed over to a new Committee in 1963 after the TRCA's eventual amalgamation.

In the first race, 34 crews rowed over a three-mile course from Chiswick Steps to Putney Pier. The entry has grown steadily over the years and in 1988 the race was extended to the full four and a quarter mile Championship Course from Mortlake to Putney (i.e., the Oxford and Cambridge Boat Race course in reverse).

Since its inception, many changes have taken place to the race, including the course length and alterations. Most crew/boat categories with four rowers have been added. In particular the introduction of quads was in 1973 when there were just three entries. Women's crews first competed in the HOR4s in 1977 (when there were 20 entries) after the event merged with the Women's Rowing Committee Head of the River Fours. Lightweight events were added in 2008 but have since been discontinued due to lack of entries. In general, the race is over-subscribed and attracts entries from all over the United Kingdom and abroad.

Fuller, Smith and Turner began their sponsorship of the Race in 1979 and event winners are rewarded each year with excellent hospitality in the Hock Cellar at the Griffin Brewery in Chiswick, where the prizes are presented.

== Events ==
The race currently provides 18 events for coxed fours, coxless fours and quadruple sculls in Club, Academic and School/Junior categories for open and women's crews. It is run by a committee of volunteers.

== See also ==
- Rowing on the River Thames
- Head of the River Race – a similar race open to men's eights.
- Women's Eights Head of the River Race

== Notes and references ==
Notes

References

- Cleaver, Hylton, A History of Rowing
- National Amateur Rowing Association, London Metropolitan Archives, Catalogue Ref. A/NAR
