= Cygnet Rowing Club =

British rowing club

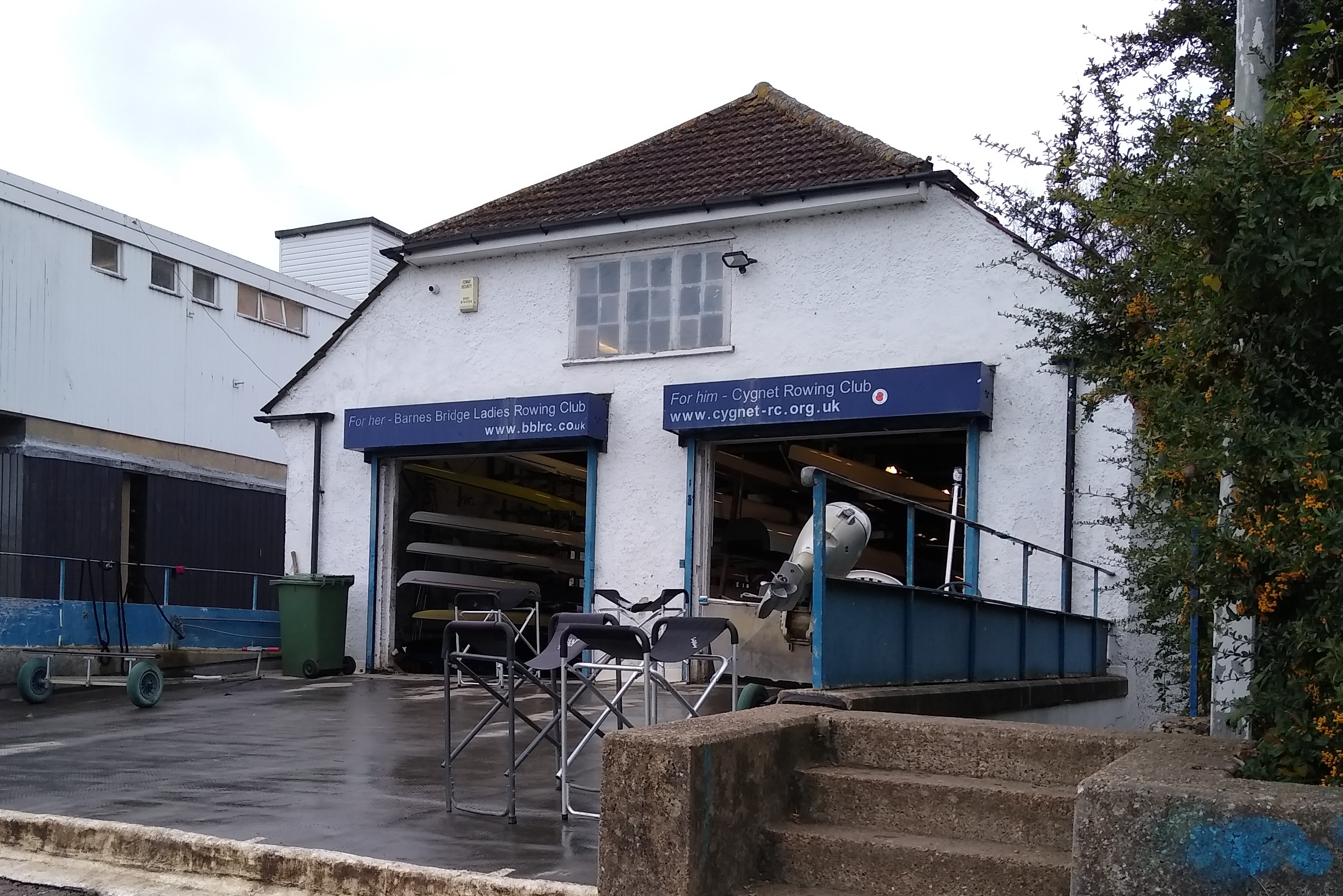

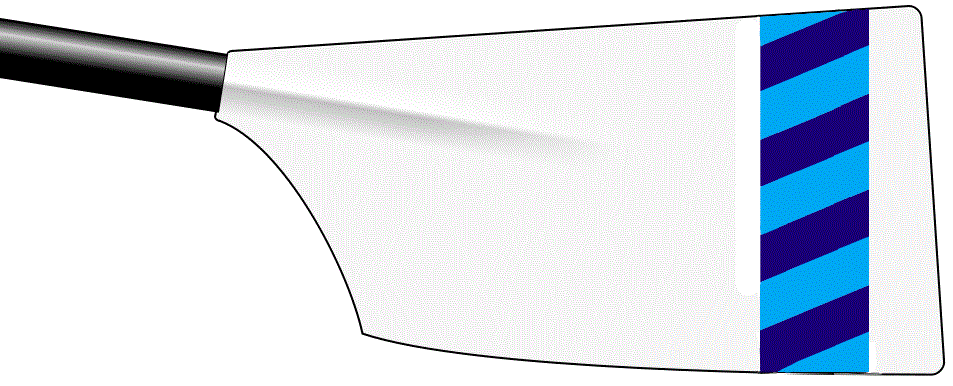
- Boathouse shared by Cygnet Rowing Club (right) and Barnes Bridge Ladies Rowing Club
- Location: Civil Service Sports Club Boathouse, Duke's Meadows, Chiswick, London
- Home water: River Thames
- Founded: 1890
- Affiliations: British Rowing
- Website: www.cygnet-rc.org.uk

Cygnet Rowing Club is a rowing club founded in 1890 on the River Thames in England.

The club is based at the Civil Service Sports Club Boathouse at Duke's Meadows in Chiswick, London, next to Barnes Bridge to the immediate west and Dukes Meadows sports fields behind the clubhouse.

The club was founded for non-manual male workers in the General Post Office and rowed at Putney. It later moved to Hammersmith and then to the CSSC Boathouse in the 1930s. After World War II it was decided to merge the several Civil Service rowing clubs that then existed into Cygnet, the one which had the largest membership.

The club has competed intermittently before and since 2008 at Henley Royal Regatta. The boathouse is shared with the more recently established Barnes Bridge Ladies Rowing Club (previously Civil Service Ladies RC), whose blades are a mid-blue, between shades of those featured in a wide band toward the tips of Cygnet RC's blades.

== See also ==
- Rowing on the River Thames
