= HSBC Rowing Club =

- HSBC
- Location: Putney, London, England
- Coordinates: 51°28′10″N 0°13′15″W
- Home water: Tideway
- Founded: 1878
- Membership: HSBC employees and closest affiliates/former employees
- Affiliations: British Rowing boat code: HSB; Thames Regional Rowing Council
- Website: none; has intranet pages of associated banking group.

Events
- None of own present, significant racing calendar note.

HSBC Rowing Club was a rowing club based on the Tideway of the River Thames in Putney, London, England. As with the bank, it succeeds Midland Bank and therefore Midland Bank Rowing Club, which was founded in 1878.

== History ==
=== Foundation ===
The club's forebear was founded by 1900 as London City & Midland Bank rowing club as the name of the bank had not simplified. In June 1901, those racing the already "annual event" that faced the London Joint Stock Bank and the Union Bank, side-by-side, were G. Webb, E.A. Briscombe, R. H. Baker, J. C. McTurk, F. H. Ward, C. A. S. Locking, T. G. Burt, A. Bugler and B. J. Buckhurst (cox). The bank's most senior official there was Colonol Pollock also of Leander Club. The race was watched by "a full complement" of passengers of the Queen Elizabeth sailing from London Bridge to watch the Hammersmith-to-Putney race. This bank's club won the "very handsome" prizes and the evening was serenaded by the Tudor Orchestra.

The premises, known as HSBC clubhouse or boathouse interchangeably, is that which used to be Midland Bank rowing club. It has a few later additions and alterations. Its façade is white paint/unpainted woodwork and brickwork that has black boathouse doors – it has a flag but unusually has no major signs or brand-linked paintwork.

The bank was taken over by HSBC in 1992 and the old name, in rowing, was phased out by 1999.

=== 20th century overview ===
An ARA reply of 1903 was, also approved and affirmed, addressed to The London City and Midland Bank Rowing Club's honorary secretary. The club became ARA-affiliated in June of that year.

In the summer of 1925 the Midland Bank eight "crew" had an "unbeaten record" – though perhaps this refers to the Tideway, or the summer versus Oxford and Cambridge events, only.

=== 20th century social scene ===
In 1935 the annual club dinner was held at The Windsor Castle, Victoria (Westminster) with performers: Bertha Willmott, Elisse Remah, Frank Hagley and Fred Hugh. Willmott also starred in the 1932 dinner performances.

== Notable results ==
- Summer 1925 - locally/nationally "unbeaten crew"

== See also ==
- Rowing on the River Thames
