= Scullers Head of the River Race =

Annual rowing race on the river Thames, England

- Frequency: Annual
- Locations: Championship Course, River Thames in London, England
- Years active: 1954-Present
- Previous event: 23 September 2023
- Next event: 28 September 2025
- Participants: 400 crews
- Website: www.vestarowing.co.uk/vesta-scullers-head

The Scullers Head of the River Race is a rowing race held annually on the River Thames Championship Course from Mortlake to Putney, open to single scullers only. The race is held in November or early December each year on a week usually to suit the mid-morning or mid-afternoon timing of the ebb tide.

== History ==
The Scullers Head was first raced in 1954 when it was won by John Marsden. It now admits entries of over 500 scullers and is the largest sculling race in the UK for a single class of racing shell. The race gains enough entries to organise the greatest number of marshalls for any singles event on the Thames and it draws considerably more overseas single scullers than the same race held in reverse usually three to four weeks before, the Wingfield Sculls, which dates to the middle of the 19th century.

In 2014 were the first admissions of categories for adaptive rowing for athletes with disabilities, in TA and LTA adaptive rowing classifications.

== Annual organisation ==
The race is organised by Vesta Rowing Club, Putney, London.

== Results ==
=== Men ===
Date	Winner	Club	Time	Notes
1954	A J Marsden	Vesta RC		
1955	T A Fox	London RC		
1956	T A Fox	London RC		
1957	D V Melvin	John O'Gaunt RC		
1958	D V Melvin	John O'Gaunt RC		
1959	M A Spracklen	Marlow RC		
1960	G V Justicz	Birmingham RC		
1961	K R Smith	Nottingham University BC		
1962	N J Birkmyre & J M Russell	Ariel RC & Molesey BC		Dead Heat
1963	W L Barry	Quintin BC		
1964	W L Barry	Quintin BC		
1965	W L Barry	Quintin BC		
1966	W L Barry	Quintin BC		
1967	H A Wardell-Yerburgh			
1968	H A Wardell-Yerburgh			
1969	K V Dwan	Poplar, Blackwell and District RC		
1970	K V Dwan	Poplar, Blackwell and District RC		
1971	K V Dwan	Poplar, Blackwell and District RC		
1972	P G R Delafield	Tideway Scullers School		
1973	K V Dwan	Poplar, Blackwell and District RC		
1974	Chris L Ballieu	Leander Club		
1975	Chris L Ballieu	Leander Club		
1976	Chris L Ballieu	Leander Club		
1977	Chris L Ballieu	Leander Club		
1978	T J Crooks	Leander Club		
1979	Chris L Ballieu	Leander Club		
1980	M Spencer	Poplar, Blackwell and District RC		
1981	Chris L Ballieu	Leander Club		
1982	Chris L Ballieu	Leander Club		
1983	Chris L Ballieu	Leander Club		
1984	Chris L Ballieu	Leander Club		
1985	Carl Smith	Nottingham RC		
1986	Steve Redgrave	Marlow RC		
1987	Nick Burfitt	Imperial College BC		
1988	Simon Larkin	Nottingham RC		
1989	Simon Larkin	Nottingham RC		
1990	Rory Henderson	Leander Club	22:51	
1991	Steven Redgrave	Marlow RC	21:32	
1992	Guy Pooley	Leander Club	20:56	
1993	Peter Haining	Auriol Kensington RC	23:13	
1994	Peter Haining	Auriol Kensington RC	19:53	
1995	Niall O'Toole	Commercial Rowing Club, Dublin	21:16	
1996	Peter Haining	Auriol Kensington RC	21:49	
1997	Martin Kettle	Queens Tower BC	20:31	
1998	Greg Searle	Molesey BC	21:18	
1999	Giles Monnickendam	Nottinghamshire County RA	21:29	
2000	Rod Chisholm	Tideway Scullers School		
2001	Guy Pooley	Leander Club	20:03.94	
2002	Tim Male	Tideway Scullers School		
2003	Cancelled due to exceptional weather conditions			
2004	Mark Hunter	Leander Club	21:22.13	
2005	Tom Gale	Tideway Scullers School	22:05.18	
2006	Mahé Drysdale	Tideway Scullers School	19:55.26	
2007	George Whittaker	Imperial College BC	20:58.76	
2008	Alan Campbell	Tideway Scullers School	20:30.57	
2009	Jamie Kirkwood	Imperial College BC	20:55.38	
2010	Stephen Feeney	London RC	21:31.20	
2011	Adam Freeman-Pask	Imperial College BC	21:09.02	
2012	Alan Campbell	Tideway Scullers School	20:43.32	
2013	Sigmund Verstraete	Walton RC	21:06.99	
2014	Jamie Copus	Oxford Brookes University BC	21:03.55	
2015	Cancelled due to exceptional weather conditions			
2016	Pedro Fraga	Sporting Clube de Portugal		
2017	Calvin Tarczy	St Paul's School BC		
2018	Cancelled due to exceptional weather conditions			
2019	Sebastian Devereux	Leander Club	21:20.97	
2020	Cancelled due to COVID-19 pandemic			
2021	Jamie Copus	Oxford Brookes University BC	21:40.17	
2022	Rui Xu	London RC	20:52.11	
2023	Jamie Copus	Oxford Brookes University BC	20:37.02	
2024	Cancelled due to no river closure			

=== Women ===
Date	Winner	Club	Time
1975	J Rankine	Thames RC	
1976	C Moss	Thames RC	
1977	D Bishop	Wallingford RC	
1978	S Hhandscomb	Civil Service Ladies' RC	
1979	B Jones	Thames RC	
1980	J A Corbin	Civil Service Ladies' RC	
1981			
1982			
1983	N Ray	Imperial College BC	
1984	B Jones	Broxbourne RC	
1985	N Ray	Rob Roy BC	
1986	S Clark	City of Cambridge RC	
1987	G Bond	Civil Service Ladies' RC	
1988	A Marden	Thames Tradesmen's RC	
1989	A Marden	Thames Tradesmen's RC	
1990	A Marden	Thames Tradesmen's RC	
1991	A Marden	Thames Tradesmen's RC	
1992	A Marden	Thames Tradesmen's RC	
1993	A Hall	Upper Thames RC	
1994	A Hall	Upper Thames RC	
1995	Guin Batten	Thames RC	
1996	P Reid	Lea RC	
1997	Guin Batten	Thames RC	
1998	Guin Batten	Thames RC	
1999	Sue Appelboom	Mortlake, Anglian & Alpha BC	
2000	H Casey	Wallingford RC	
2001	Sue Appelboom	Mortlake, Anglian & Alpha BC	
2002	Guin Batten	Leander Club	
2003	Cancelled due to exceptional weather conditions		
2004	K Greves	University of London BC	
2005	M Pauls	Imperial College BC	
2006	J Golsack	Wallingford RC	
2007	K Stiller	Nottingham RC	
2008	Hester Goodsell	Reading University BC	
2009	Hester Goodsell	Reading University BC	22:21.92
2010	Beth Rodford	Gloucester RC	22:54.06
2011	Imogen Walsh	London RC	22:35.9
2012	Georgina Phillips	Imperial College BC	22:40.24
2013	Lou Reeve	Leander Club	22:14:41
2014	Brianna Stubbs	Wallingford RC	22:41.31
2015	Cancelled due to exceptional weather conditions		
2016	Suzi Perry	Thames RC	
2017	Meghann Jackson	Thames RC	
2018	cancelled due to exceptional weather conditions		
2019	Katy Wilkinson-Feller	Tideway Scullers School	22:38.70
2020	Cancelled due to COVID-19 pandemic		
2021	Jessica Leyden	Leander Club	23:16.87
2022	Katie Mole	University of Birmingham BC	23:05.78
2023	Georgia Mianarow	London RC	21:49.73
2024	Cancelled due to no river closure		

== See also ==
- Metropolitan Regatta The London Cup (singles). Held in late May/very early June at Eton-Dorney Lake.
- Diamond Challenge Sculls rowed by race-winning singles at Henley Royal Regatta, forming the second prerequisite of the rare accomplishment of a 'Triple Crown' with those above and below. Held in July.
- Wingfield Sculls rowed by singles along the course in reverse, the last component of the 'Triple Crown'. Held in October or early November. Where the Scullers' Head is also won there is the theoretical possibility of a 'Quadruple Crown' for a single sculler able to win all four events. As the Diamond Sculls is not open to women, a win at the Scullers Head forms the last leg of the UK's Triple Crown for an all-round champion female single sculler.
- Rowing on the River Thames
