= Collingham College =

School in Kensington and Chelsea, UK

Coordinates: 51°29′31.5″N 0°11′18″W

- London's Royal Borough of Kensington and Chelsea; United Kingdom

Information
- Type: Private, co-educational school
- Established: 1975

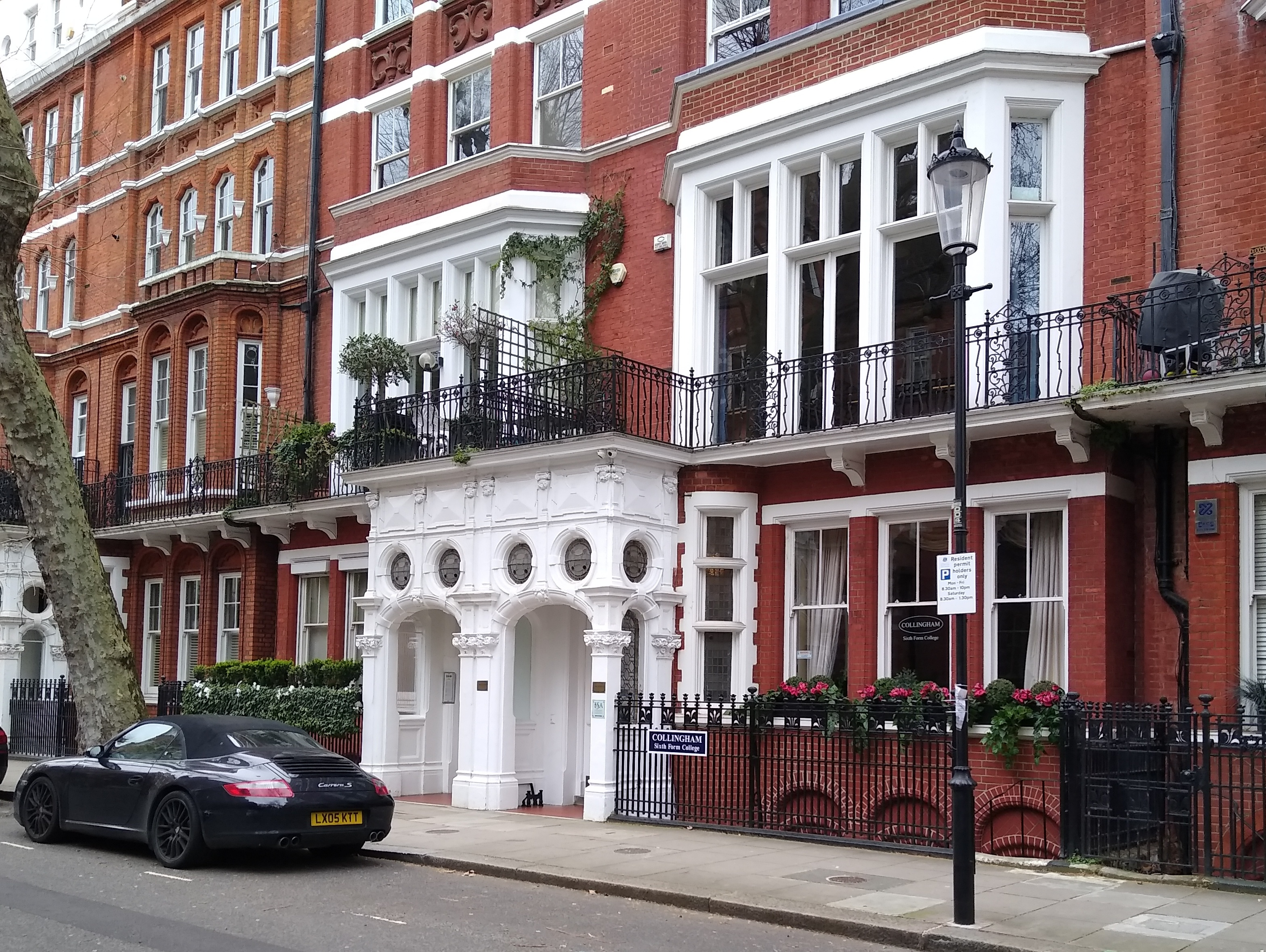
Collingham College, Kensington.

Collingham College is a private, co-educational secondary school, founded as Collingham Tutors in 1975, by Old Etonian John Marsden and Nicholas Browne. It is located in the Kensington area of London.

The school teaches pupils who are studying for GCSEs and A-Levels, typically undertaken between the ages of 14 and 18, although as a tutorial college, the school takes pupils outside of the usual age bands, such as those sitting their exams for a second time.

The school is set over two sites, a Sixth Form-focused facility located at 23 Collingham Gardens, a Queen Anne style townhouse, and a GCSE facility at 16 Young Street, near High Street Kensington, in a Georgian townhouse once home to William Thackeray and Sir Maurice Gwyer.

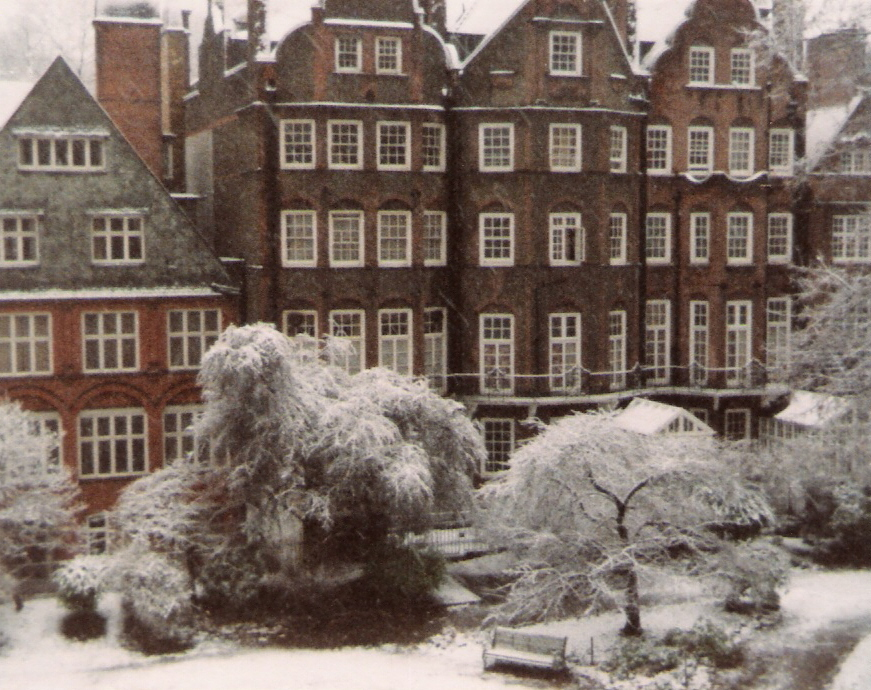
Christmas at Collingham Gardens.

The college is still privately owned with the current Directors being the son and grandson of its founders.

The Principal of Collingham is James Allder BA.

Many of the tutors at Collingham are expert academics, who join the school after professional careers in their field. Mock admissions tests and interviews are available for Oxbridge applicants. There are about two hundred and fifty students at Collingham. Students come from a range of academic abilities and backgrounds, with many joining from public schools. They run Christmas and Easter revision courses near to exams which are available to the public.

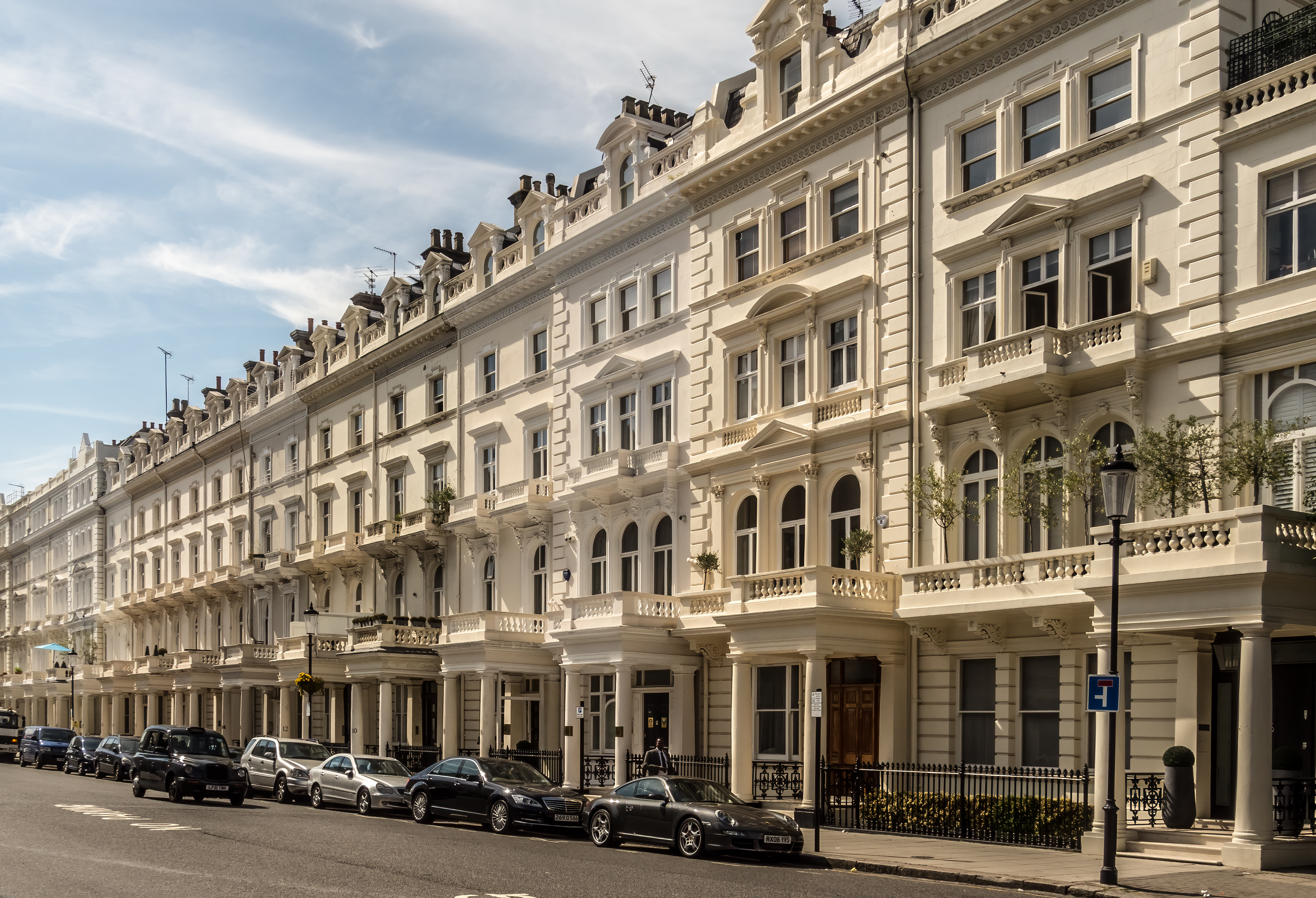
17 Queen's Gate Place, a building formerly used by the GCSE section of the College before Young Street.

According to the Good Schools Guide, "You go to Collingham for two things - the academics and the sense of being independent while, in reality, being nurtured and carefully monitored. The level of support given to students is exceptional, reflected in a growth of confidence and the desire to succeed." Collingham's sixth form was originally Gibbs' Preparatory School whose former pupils include Prince Edward, Duke of Edinburgh, David Armstrong-Jones, 2nd Earl of Snowdon, Robert Kennedy, Ted Kennedy and Frederick Tennyson.

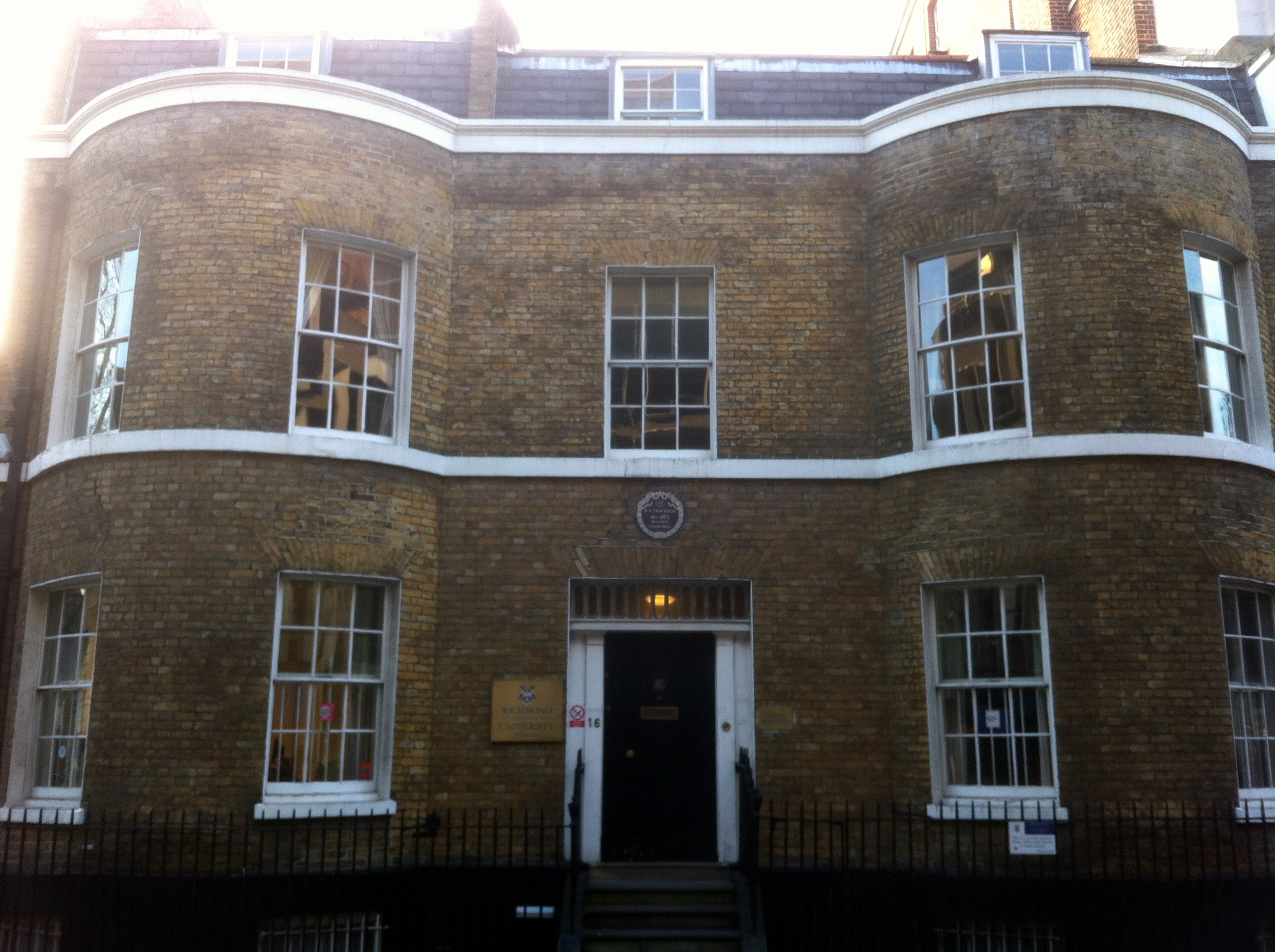
Thackeray's House, Kensington. Present site of GCSE school.

== The Boltons Garden Party ==
Collingham students support and attend the annual St Mary The Boltons summer fair, held in The Boltons garden square every June.

== Alumni ==
(Collingham and as it was previously known Gibbs Prep)

=== Royalty and Nobility ===
- Prince Edward, Duke of Edinburgh
- David Armstrong-Jones, 2nd Earl of Snowdon
- Thomas Corbett, 2nd Baron Rowallan, British Army Officer, Grenadier Guards
- Anthony Havelock-Allan, 4th Baronet

=== Politicians ===
- Ted Kennedy
- Allan Henry Hoover
- Herbert Hoover Jr.
- Claiborne Pell
- The Lord Grimond
- John Profumo

=== Film directors and actors ===
- Frederick Tennyson
- Sir Peter Ustinov
- Richard Armitage
- Anthony Asquith
- Minnie Driver

=== Novelists ===
- Sir John Mortimer
- Christopher Robin Milne, the inspiration for Christopher Robin from Winnie-the-Pooh
- Anthony Powell

=== Other ===
- Sir Richard Doll FRS, Epidemiologist
- Georgia May Jagger, designer, model, and socialite
- Matthew Warburton
