= Vesta Veterans International Eights Head of the River Race =

Annual rowing race in London, England

Vesta Veterans International Head of the River Race
- Date: One-day
- Frequency: Annual
- Locations: Championship Course, River Thames in London, England
- Years active: 1954–Present
- Next event: 27 March 2022
- Website: www.vestarowing.co.uk/veterans-head-of-the-river/

The Vesta Veterans Head which often sees notable entries under the title the Vesta Veterans International Head of the River Race is a rowing race held annually on the River Thames over the Championship Course.

== Course ==
The direction in which it is raced will be advertised as the preferred ebb tide, if that occurs fairly near the middle of the day. The direction is confirmed from many weeks ahead on the race website. It is raced from Mortlake to Putney or vice versa.

== Categories and entries ==
It is open to veteran (also known as masters) eights and quads, who race in prize categories determined by their average ages, plus novice prizes for the least-race-points crews in the men's, women's and mixed categories, which are further sub-categories of each category. The race always takes place on the day after the Head of the River Race. There is on-water marshalling provided and an entry fee applies. Any surplus money is applied to further the sport of rowing.

== Organiser ==
It is organised by Vesta Rowing Club.
