= Reading University Head of the River Race =

The Reading University Head of the River Race is a rowing race held annually on the River Thames in Reading, England. It is rowed over a 4.6 kilometres (2.9 mi) downstream course, starting near the former Roebuck public house in Tilehurst and finishing near Caversham Bridge in central Reading.

The race has been run since 1935, making it the fourth oldest head of the river race. It is organised by the boat club of the University of Reading. Competitors include boats from universities and schools.
