= Vesta Rowing Club =

British rowing club

- Emblems: 1. cipher of V R C. 2. V R C around two crossed crimson/black oblique-striped swallowtail pennant flags
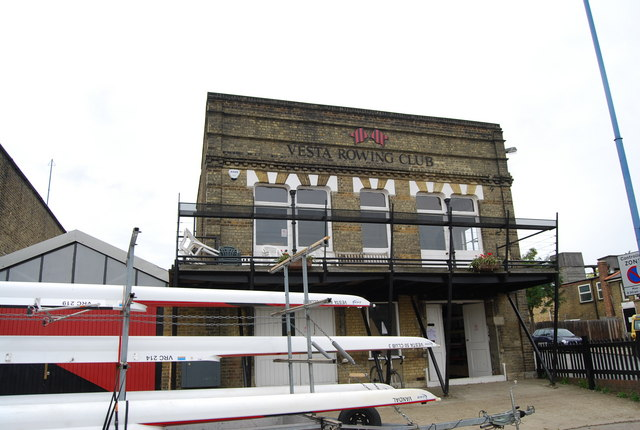

- Location: Putney, London, England
- Coordinates: 51°28′10″N 0°13′13″W
- Home water: Tideway
- Founded: 1870
- Affiliations: British Rowing boat code: VRC; Thames Regional Rowing Council; Remenham Club
- Website: www.vestarowing.co.uk

Events
- Scullers Head (September); Veterans Head (March)

Notable members
- Harry Blackstaffe

Vesta Rowing Club is a rowing club based on the Tideway of the River Thames in Putney, London, England. It was founded in 1870.

Vesta organises two head races every year; the Scullers Head and the Veterans Head.

== History ==
=== Foundation ===
Vesta Rowing Club was founded in 1870. It is said that during the club's inaugural meeting, members decided that the club should be named after the first boat to pass under London Bridge. The first boat, a steam tug, to pass under the bridge was Vesta.

The club's first home was Salters Boathouse which was a part of Feathers Pub on the Wandle which flows into the Tideway just west of Wandsworth Bridge. In 1875, the club moved to the Unity boathouse (now the Ranelagh Sailing Club) and from there to its present clubhouse next door in 1890.

To begin with, the Vesta only raced in-house. The club's first known entry in an open race coming in 1876. The first open win came that year with J. Whaley winning the Junior Sculls at Windsor and Eton Regatta. The first sweep oared win did not come until 1888 and that was a Junior Senior IV at Walton Regatta. The blades are split crimson and black obliquely.

=== 20th century ===
From that date onwards Vesta had increasing success on the water, not the least of which included Harry Blackstaffe’s double victory in the Diamond Sculls at Henley Royal Regatta, the Wingfield Sculls on the Thames in 1906 and Olympic Gold medal in the 1908 London Olympics.

The club practically ceased functioning during the Great War of 1914–18 only being kept alive through the activities of some of its older members and those on leave from the front who occasionally rowed. There were 214 paid-up members of Vesta in 1914. 78 joined up of whom 12 made the ultimate sacrifice, gave their lives in that struggle.

In 1920 the club lost in the final of the Wyfold IVs at Henley Royal Regatta. It was the club’s first finals day appearance at that August regatta in a sweep-oared boat. In 1930 the club finally had success in this class of boat at the Regatta winning the Thames Challenge Cup for club VIIIs.

In December 1936 a fire ripped through the clubhouse destroying many of its records and trophies, and damaging or destroying some thirty boats. That summer Eric Wingate and David Baddeley went on to win the Silver Goblets & Nickalls' Challenge Cup for the club at Henley Regatta.

During the Second World War the London Fire Brigade requisitioned Vesta’s clubhouse for the duration of the hostilities. Rowing however continued as Barclays Bank Rowing Club allowed Vesta to operate out of its premises further along the Embankment. Seven pre-war members of the club did not return from that conflict.

In 1960 the club’s coxless IV won at Twickenham, Marlow, Kingston and as favourites, won through to the final at Henley Royal Regatta losing to St. Thomas’ Hospital.

In 1976 the first VIII won the Grand Challenge Cup at Marlow Regatta. A coxless IV made up of rowers from this crew won a silver medal in that year's national championships.

In 1981 the club returned to winning ways at Henley Regatta with the club's coxed IV winning the Britannia Cup.

The club's highest ever finish in the Eights Head of the River Race was recorded in 1986 when the club's first VIII finished sixth overall, winning the Vernon Trophy as the fastest Tideway crew.

=== Senior Women ===
March 1994 was a notable year for the club when members voted to allow women join as full members. With time success followed. The club won Senior VIIIs and lightweight Sculls at Henley Women's Regatta in 2004. The women's senior squad repeated this victory in 2010 when they again won Senior VIIIs at that regatta and competed on Saturday at Henley Royal Regatta. The squad continued with their domestic success winning the Intermediate Club VIIIs at Henley Women's Regatta in 2011 and again in 2012.

== Events ==
Vesta has run many annual competitions down through the years. The club first started doing this in 1912. In 1923 the Vesta Dashes, which were a mid-summer short course competition run over three evenings, were instigated. As already stated in 1954 the club founded the Scullers’ Head of the River race.

In 1981 Vesta organised the first Veterans’ Head of the River Race when then main VIIIs Head race stopped taking Veteran entries. This race is now one of the largest head races that takes place on the tidal Thames with competitors and crews coming from across the UK and abroad to participate.

== Notable results ==
In 2009 the senior men's coxed IV reached the finals of the Britannia Challenge Cup at Henley Royal Regatta. Unfortunately, the unseeded Vesta crew were defeated by just under a length in the final to Agecroft Rowing Club.

In 2014 Vesta won the Horton Cup for Senior coxless fours at the Metropolitan Regatta and raced through to Saturday of Henley Royal Regatta.

- 1906 - Winner, Wingfield Sculls: Harry Blackstaffe
- 1908 - Winner, Diamond Sculls, Henley Royal Regatta
- 1930 - Winner, Thames Challenge Cup, Henley Royal Regatta
- 1936 - Winners, Silver Goblets, Henley Royal Regatta: Eric Wingate and David Baddeley
- 1972 - Winner, 1972 British Rowing Championships, Men's 2- composite
- 1976 - Silver, British National Rowing Championship,
- 1981 - Winners, Britannia Challenge Cup, Henley Royal Regatta
- 1981 - Semi-finalists, Thames Challenge Cup, Henley Royal Regatta
- 1984 - Winner, 1984 British Rowing Championships, Whitbread Sprint
- 1985 - Winner, 1985 British Rowing Championships, Men's 2+
- 2004 - Winner, Elite Lightweight Single Scull, Henley Women's Regatta: Charlotte Easton
- 2004 - Winners, Senior VIIIs, Henley Women's Regatta
- 2005 - Winner, 2005 British Rowing Championships Open 2x
- 2009 - Finalists, Britannia Challenge Cup, Henley Royal Regatta
- 2010 - Winners, Senior VIIIs, Henley Women's Regatta
- 2010 - Semi-finalists Remenham Challenge Cup, Henley Royal Regatta
- 2011 - Winners, Intermediate VIIIs, Henley Women's Regatta
- 2012 - Winners, Intermediate VIIIs, Henley Women's Regatta
- 2013 - 3rd Place, WEHORR
- 2013 - Quarter-finalists, Remenham Challenge Cup, Henley Royal Regatta
- 2013 - Semi-finalists, Wyfold Challenge Cup, Henley Royal Regatta

== See also ==
- Rowing on the River Thames
