= King's College School Boat Club =

British rowing club

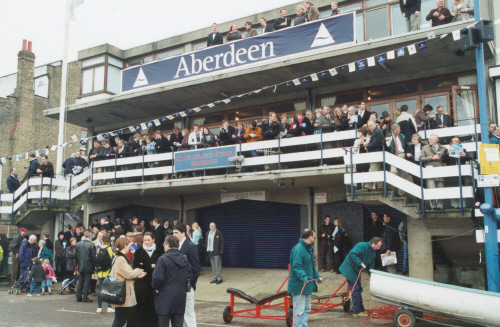

- Location: Putney, London, England
- Coordinates: 51°28′8.2″N 0°13′11″W
- Home water: Tideway
- Founded: 1864
- Affiliations: British Rowing boat code - KCS
- Website: www.kcsbcsa.co.uk

King's College School Boat Club is the rowing club of King's College School, Wimbledon, London, England and is affiliated to British Rowing. The club's boat house is based on the towpath in Putney, south-west London, on the River Thames.

== History ==
The club was founded in 1864. Previously, the club was based upriver, just above Hampton Court at Molesey Boat Club.

In 1993 the club purchased the Barclays Boat Club, which led to a revitalisation of KCSBC. The boathouse was shared with Godolphin and Latymer.

== Other uses of the boat house ==
It is used by Cambridge University Boat Club when practising and competing in their annual Boat Race against Oxford University Boat Club on the Tideway. It is also used by other visiting clubs when they are competing on the Tideway.

The club room is available for hire through the school itself.

== Honours ==
=== British champions ===
Year	Winning crew/s
1984	Men J16 4+
