= Parr's Priory Rowing Club =

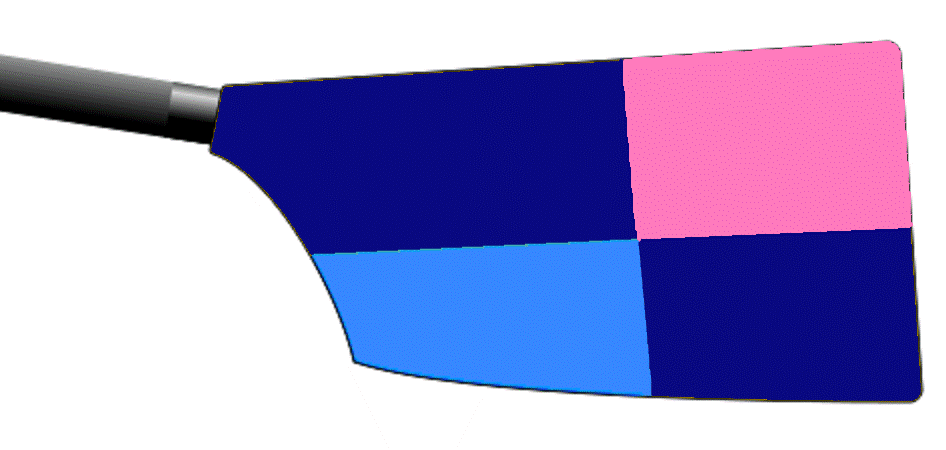
- Location: Barn Elms Boathouse, Queen Elizabeth Walk, (Barnes) London SW13 0DG
- Coordinates: 51.474°N 0.225°W
- Home water: Tideway
- Founded: circa 2000
- Affiliations: British Rowing boat code: PAR
- Website: www.parrspriory.org.uk

Parr's Priory Rowing Club is a rowing club in the east extreme of Barnes, London, close to Putney. The club was formed in about 2000 and is between Putney and Hammersmith Bridges. Opposite it on the river is Craven Cottage, the home of Fulham F.C. Its boathouse is shared with Barn Elms Rowing Club.

== Membership ==
Membership is relatively small, out of the 20 Tideway non-educational establishment rowing clubs. The club is happy to take on complete novices to the sport at certain times of the year.

== Official name ==
The CASC (community amateur sports club) as which the club files its charity/tax returns is Aldebaran Club K/A Parr's Priory Rowing Club.

== Honours ==
=== British junior championships ===
| Year | Winning crew/s |
|---|---|
Add here

== See also ==
- Rowing on the River Thames
