= Chiswick Bridge =

Bridge in London, England

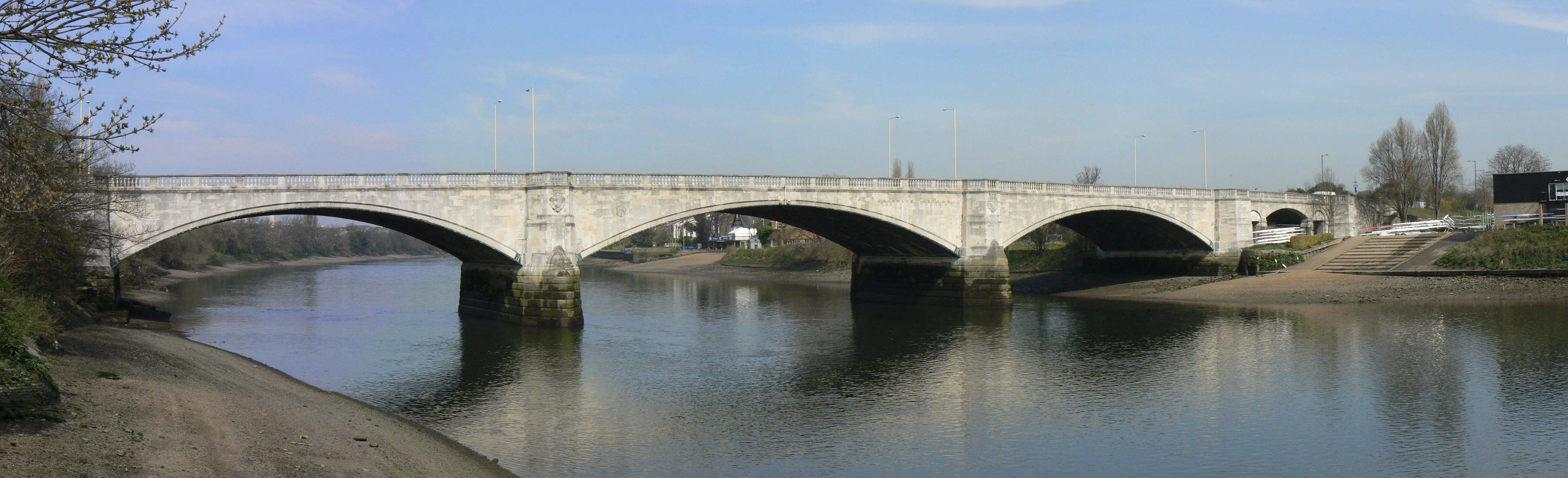
- Coordinates: 51°28′23″N 0°16′11″W
- Carries: A316 road
- Crosses: River Thames
- Locale: Mortlake and Chiswick
- Maintained by: Transport for London
- Heritage status: Grade II listed structure
- Preceded by: Kew Railway Bridge
- Followed by: Barnes Railway Bridge

Characteristics
- Design: Deck arch bridge
- Material: Reinforced concrete, Portland stone
- Total length: 606 feet (185 m)
- Width: 70 feet (21 m)
- Longest span: 150 feet (46 m)
- No. of spans: 5
- Piers in water: 2
- Clearance below: 39 feet (12 m) at lowest astronomical tide

History
- Designer: Sir Herbert Baker and Alfred Dryland
- Constructed by: Cleveland Bridge & Engineering Company
- Opened: 3 July 1933; 92 years ago

Statistics
- Daily traffic: 39,710 vehicles (2004)

Listed Building – Grade II
- Official name: Chiswick Bridge and attached balustrades
- Designated: 26 September 2002
- Reference no.: 1031877

Chiswick Bridge is a reinforced concrete deck arch bridge over the River Thames in West London. It is one of three bridges opened in 1933 as part of an ambitious scheme to relieve traffic congestion west of London. The structure carries the A316 road between Chiswick on the north bank of the Thames and Mortlake on the south bank.

The bridge is built on the site of a former ferry. It is 606 feet (185 m) long and faced with 3,400 tons of Portland stone. When the 150-foot (46 m) central span opened it was the longest concrete span over the Thames. The bridge is well known for its proximity to the end of The Championship Course, the stretch of the Thames used for the Boat Race and other rowing events.

== Background ==
The villages of Chiswick and Mortlake, about 6 miles (9.7 km) west of central London on the north and south banks of the River Thames, had been linked by a ferry since at least the 17th century. Both areas were sparsely populated, so there was little demand for a fixed river crossing at that point.

With the arrival of railways and the London Underground in the 19th century commuting to London became practical and affordable, and the populations of Chiswick and Mortlake grew rapidly. In 1909 the Great Chertsey Road scheme was proposed, which envisaged building a major new road from Hammersmith, then on the outskirts of London, to Chertsey, 18 miles (29 km) west of central London, bypassing the towns of Kingston and Richmond. However, the scheme was abandoned due to costs and arguments between various interested parties over the exact route the road should take.

After the First World War, the population of the west London suburbs continued to grow, thanks to improved rail transport links and the growth in ownership of automobiles. In 1925, the Ministry of Transport convened a conference between Surrey and Middlesex county councils with the aim of reaching a solution to the congestion problem, and the Great Chertsey Road scheme was revived. In 1927, the Royal Commission on Cross-River Traffic approved the scheme to relieve the by then chronic traffic congestion on the existing, mostly narrow, streets in the area, and on the narrow bridges at Richmond Bridge, Kew and Hammersmith. The Ministry of Transport agreed to pay heavy subsidies towards the cost.

A new arterial road, now the A316 road, was given Royal Assent on 3 August 1928, and construction began in 1930. The construction of the road required two new bridges to be built, at Twickenham and Chiswick. The proposal was authorised in 1928 and construction began in the same year. The bridge, along with the newly built Twickenham Bridge and the rebuilt Hampton Court Bridge, was opened by Edward, Prince of Wales on 3 July 1933, and the ferry service was permanently closed.

The bridge has been a Grade II listed structure since 2002.

== Design ==
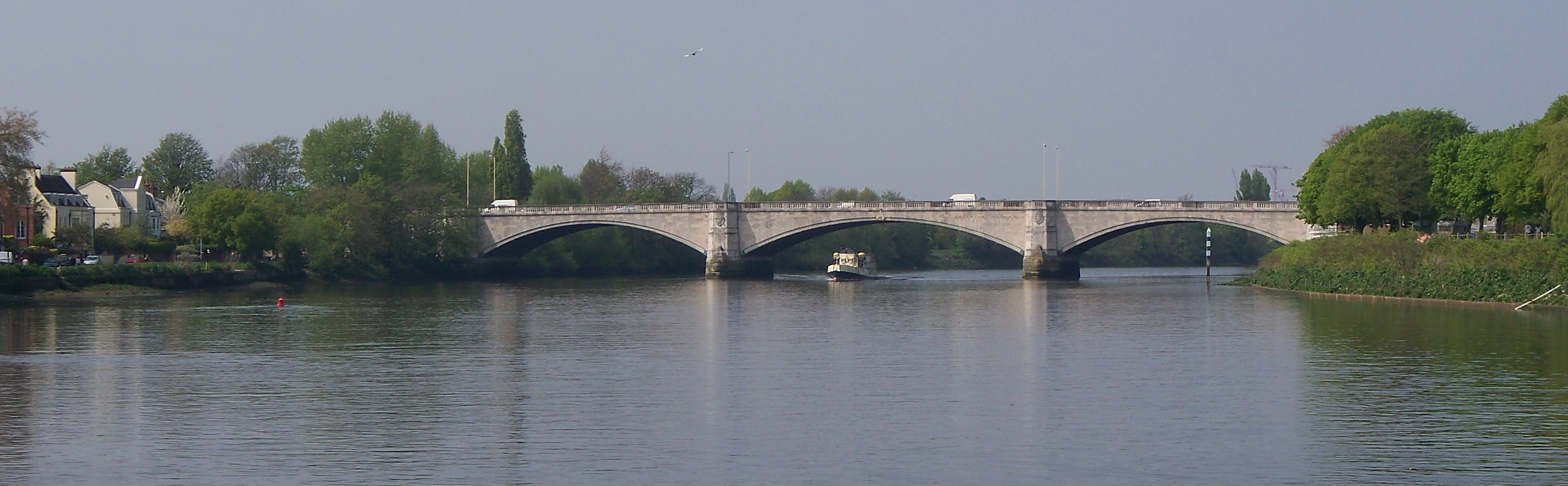
Chiswick Bridge's three central arches span the river; the other two arches span the raised towpaths.

The new bridge was designed in reinforced concrete by architect Sir Herbert Baker and engineer Alfred Dryland, with additional input from Considère Constructions, at the time Britain's leading specialist in reinforced concrete construction.

The bridge has concrete foundations supporting a five-arch cellular reinforced concrete superstructure. The deck is supported by a concealed lattice of columns and beams rising from the arched superstructure. The structure is faced with 3,400 tons of Portland stone, except for underneath the arches. The bridge is 606 feet (185 m) long, and carries two 15-foot (4.6 m) wide walkways, and a 40-foot (12 m) wide road. At the time it was built, the 150-foot (46 m) central span was the longest concrete span over the Thames.

Unusually for a Thames bridge, only three of Chiswick Bridge's five spans cross the river; the shorter spans at each end of the bridge cross the former towpaths. To allow sufficient clearance for industrial barges yet avoid steep inclines, the approach roads are elevated on embankments.

The bridge was built by the Cleveland Bridge & Engineering Company at a cost of £208,284 (about £18,678,000 in 2023). Additional costs such as building the approach roads and buying land brought the total project cost to £227,600 (about £20,410,000 in 2023). (Note: Sources disagree as to what proportion of this went on the construction; Smith (2001) and Davenport (2006) both give a figure of £175,700, while other sources generally say the other sum. All sources concur that the total costs of the Chiswick Bridge part of the project came to £227,600.) The Ministry of Transport paid 75% of the cost, with Surrey and Middlesex county councils paying the rest.

The bridge was generally well received. Country Life praised the design as "reflecting in its general design the eighteenth century Palladian tradition of Lord Burlington's famous villa at Chiswick". (Note: The reference to "Lord Burlington's famous villa" refers to Chiswick House, Chiswick's most significant building architecturally. The grounds and grand outbuildings of the house abut the far end of the northern approach.)

== Present-day ==
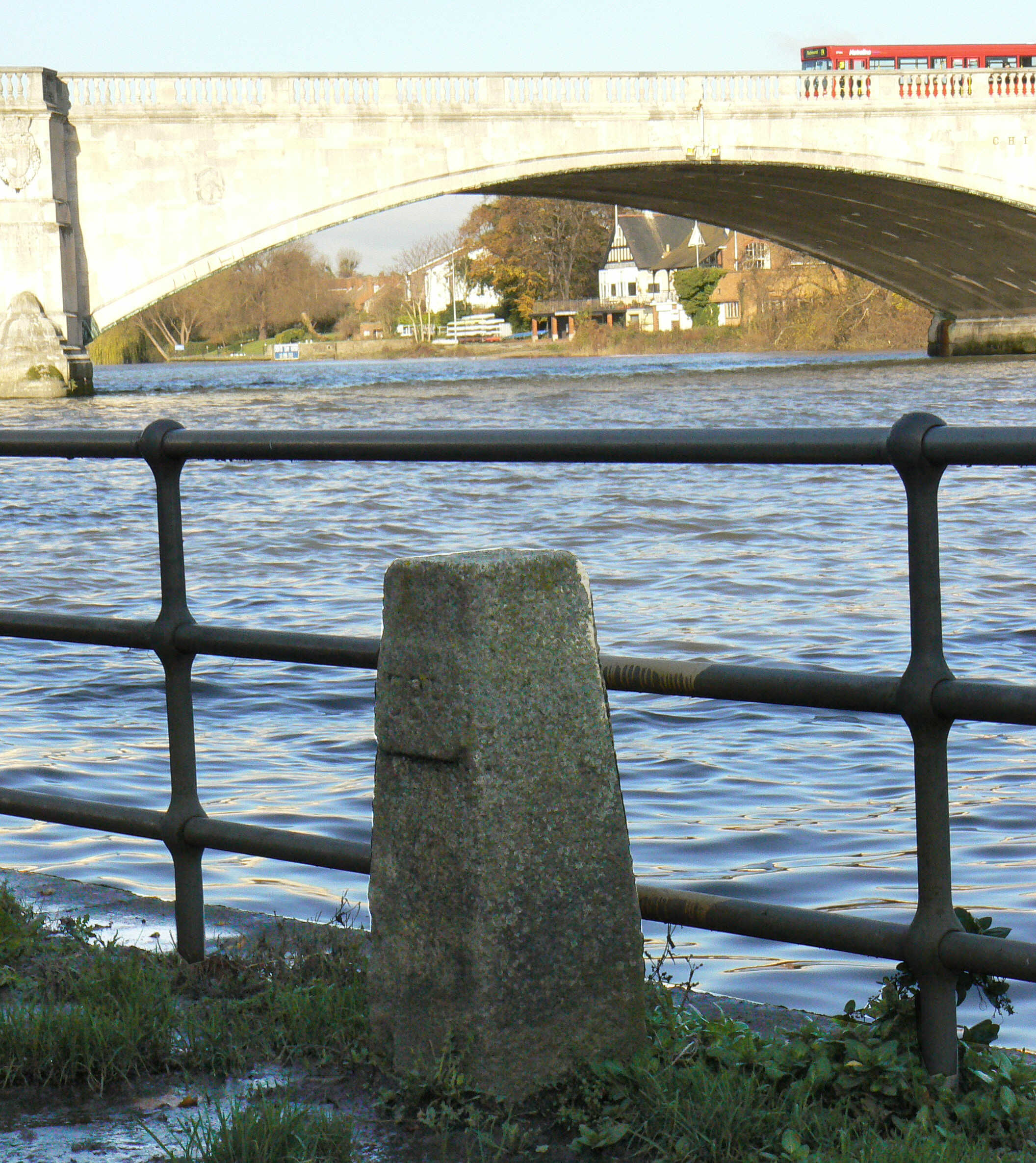
The Boat Race finish line stone

Chiswick Bridge is a major transport route, and the eighth busiest of London's 20 Thames road bridges. It is possibly best known for its proximity to the finishing line of The Championship Course, the stretch of the Thames used for the Boat Race and other rowing events. A University Boat Race Stone on the south shore, an urban embankment, faces a brightly painted Cambridge and Oxford blues wooden obelisk. This is the end of the course – 370 feet (110 m) east of the bridge.

The towpath under the bridge on the southern bank now forms part of the Thames Path. As at 2009 the northernmost arch was used by the Tideway Scullers sculling (and rowing) club as storage space.

== See also ==
- List of crossings of the River Thames
- List of bridges in London

== Notes and references ==
=== Bibliography ===
- Cookson, Brian (2006), Crossing the River, Edinburgh: Mainstream, ISBN 1-84018-976-2, OCLC 63400905
- Davenport, Neil (2006), Thames Bridges: From Dartford to the source, Kettering: Silver Link Publishing, ISBN 1-85794-229-9
- Matthews, Peter (2008), London's Bridges, Oxford: Shire, ISBN 978-0-7478-0679-0, OCLC 213309491
- Pay, Ian; Lloyd, Sampson; Waldegrave, Keith (2009), London's Bridges: Crossing the royal river, Wisley: Artists' and Photographers' Press, ISBN 978-1-904332-90-9, OCLC 280442308
- Smith, Denis (2001), Civil Engineering Heritage London and the Thames Valley, London: Thomas Telford, ISBN 0-7277-2876-8
