= Dick Offer =

British rower

Personal information
- Nationality: British (English)
- Born: 2 May 1909 Hampton Wick, England
- Died: 6 February 2007 (aged 97) Chertsey, Surrey, England

Sport
- Sport: Rowing
- Club: Kingston Rowing Club
Medal record
Men's rowing
Representing England
British Empire Games
Silver medal – second place	1938 Sydney	Double sculls

Richard Frederick Offer (2 May 1909 – 6 February 2007) was an English rower who won the Silver Goblets at Henley Royal Regatta and a silver medal at the 1938 British Empire Games.

== Biography ==
Offer was born at Hampton Wick, the son of Henry John Offer and his wife Vera Jenny Burgoine. His maternal grandfather, Alfred Burgoine, was a boat designer who built one of Queen Victoria's Royal Barges and a motor launch that held the world water speed record. He was educated at Tiffin School where he began rowing. He joined Kingston Rowing Club in 1929, where his brothers Tom and Jack Offer were already members.

Offer excelled at rowing, in particular partnering his brother Jack in the pairs. They also took part in skiffing, being members of The Skiff Club. They won the Gentlemen's Double Sculls at the Skiff Championships Regatta in 1930, 1931, 1932, 1933 and 1935. In 1936 the pair won Silver Goblets at Henley Royal Regatta. Two years later they were selected to represent England at the 1938 British Empire Games in Sydney, Australia. Offer worked in an insurance company in the City of London and had to take unpaid leave to be able to compete. Despite the difficulties in maintaining training during the six-week sea voyage to Australia they won the silver medal in the double sculls event.

Offer was also a sailor with a boat on the south coast, and later at the Thames Sailing Club at Surbiton where he owned a Thames Rater which was designed and built by his grandfather. He also played rugby for the Old Tiffinians and at County level in the winter months.

At the start of World War II, Offer was a volunteer fire-watcher on the River Thames until he gained his Commission in the Royal Navy and was employed on convoy escorts. At the D-Day Normandy landings he was a commander of tank landing craft LCT708, and lead the landings on Gold Beach.

After the war, Offer returned to rowing at Kingston RC, where he competed until the 1950s. He then began coaching at Kingston and at Tiffin School, where he inspired successes in regattas including Henley and coached future international rowers. He played a major part in developing Kingston RC's headquarters at Canbury Gardens, Kingston and helped in the running of Kingston Regatta. He became president of Kingston Rowing Club in 1993.
