= Kingston Regatta =

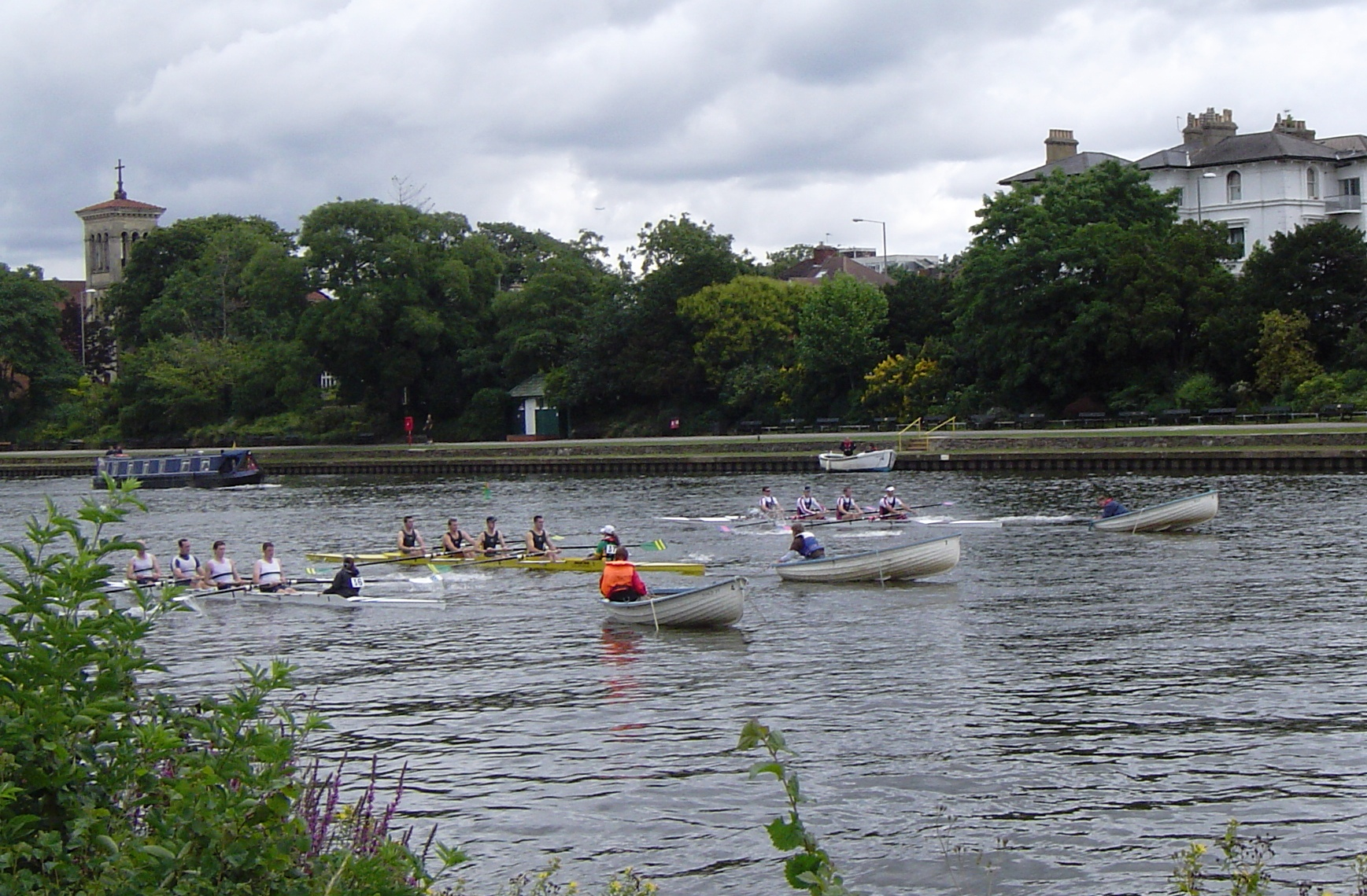
Kingston Regatta - Three lane race starting off the stake boats

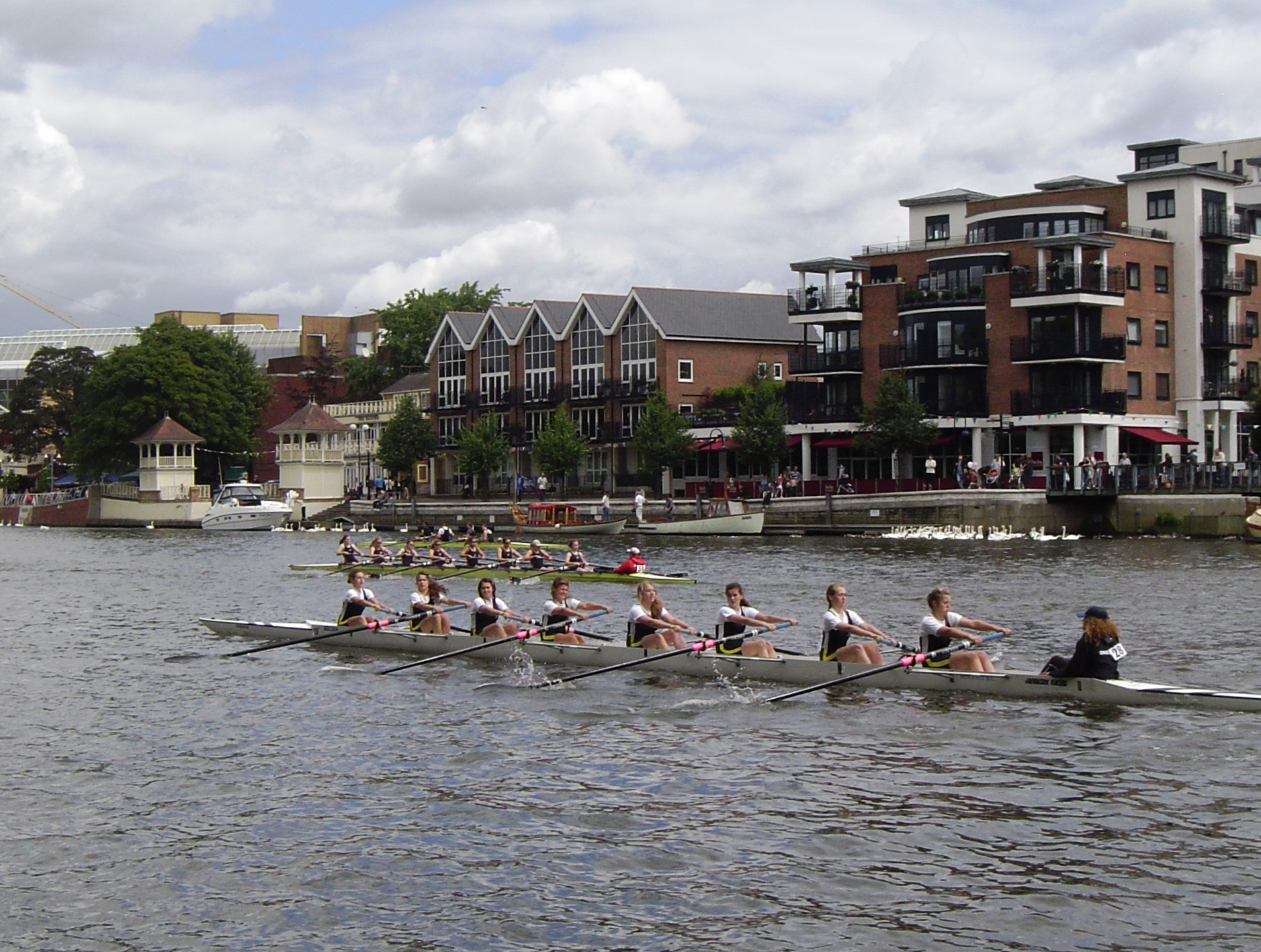
Kingston Regatta - Finish (Shallop Jubilant in the background)

Kingston Regatta is a rowing regatta, on the River Thames in England which takes place at Kingston upon Thames, Surrey on the reach above Teddington Lock.

The regatta takes place in July and forms part of the Kingston River Festival. It attracts top crews from schools, clubs and universities from around the UK. Racing takes place on the 1000 metre downstream course that stretches alongside Hampton Court Palace Park and ends just upstream of Kingston Bridge. International and Olympic rowers who have won at Kingston Regatta include Jack Beresford, Tim Crooks, Kieran West and James Cracknell.

Kingston Regatta was first raced on 1 and 2 June 1857 and, for the first 80 years, was run from Kingston Rowing Club whose boathouse was on Raven's Ait. The Regatta was a major event in both the sporting and social calendar. The Regatta moved from Raven’s Ait in 1937 to Canbury Gardens after the Club moved to Turk’s Boat House in Lower Ham Road. The Regatta moved to its current site opposite the town centre in 1991.

== See also ==
- Rowing on the River Thames
