= Jack Offer =

English rower

Personal information
- Nationality: British (English)
- Born: 16 December 1907 Hampton Wick, England
- Died: 8 November 1985 (aged 77) Berkshire, England

Sport
- Sport: Athletics
- Club: Kingston Rowing Club
Medal record
Men's rowing
Representing England
British Empire Games
Silver medal – second place	1938 Sydney	Double sculls

John Sidney Offer (16 December 1907 – 8 November 1985) was an English rower who competed at the British Empire Games.

== Biography ==
Offer was born at Hampton Wick, the son of Henry John Offer and his wife Vera Jennie Burgoine. His maternal grandfather, Alfred Burgoine, was a boat designer who built one of Queen Victoria’s Royal Barges and a motor launch that held the world water speed record. He was educated at Tiffin School where he began rowing. He joined Kingston Rowing Club where his brothers Tom and Dick Offer were also members.

Offer excelled at sculling, in particular partnering his brother Dick in the double sculls. They also took part in skiffing, being members of The Skiff Club. They won the Gentlemen's Double Sculls at the Skiff Championships Regatta in 1930, 1931, 1932, 1933 and 1935. Offer also won the Singles Skiff Championship in 1932 and 1935 and the Mixed Doubles Skiff Championship in 1933. In 1936 the Offer brothers won Silver Goblets at Henley Royal Regatta.

Two years later they were selected to represent England at the 1938 British Empire Games in Sydney, Australia. Despite difficulties in maintaining training during the six-week sea voyage to Australia they won the silver medal in the double sculls event.
