= Walbrook Rowing Club =

British rowing club

- Crossed oars set among Old English font: W R C 1961
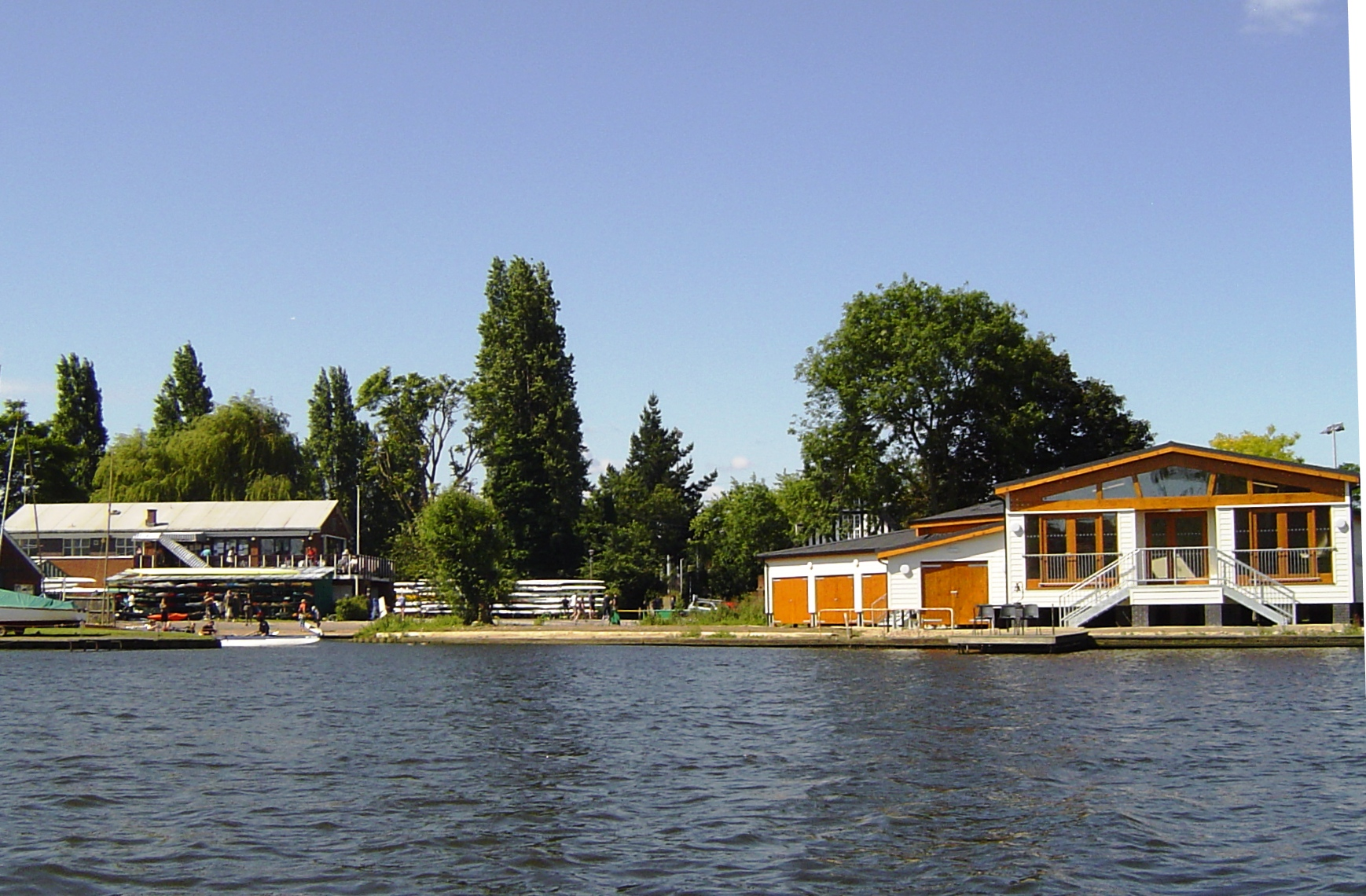

- Location: Trowlock Island, Teddington, England
- Coordinates: 51.4235°N 0.308°W
- Home water: Teddington Lock, River Thames
- Founded: 1961
- Affiliations: British Rowing boat code: WBK
- Website: www.walbrookrc.co.uk

Events
- Teddington Sculls

Distinctions
- Begun by British Petroleum

Walbrook Rowing Club, colloquially sometimes named Teddington Rowing Club, is a rowing club, on the River Thames in England on the Middlesex bank 800 metres above Teddington Lock next to Trowlock Island, Teddington. It is the lowest club on the weir-controlled Thames (i.e. not the Tideway) and is the organising club for Teddington Head of the River Race held in November for all classes of racing shells.

It shares, in its sport, the quite broad Kingston and Ditton Reach which ends 6.4 kilometres upstream at Molesey Lock with Kingston Rowing Club, Tiffin, Tiffin Girls and Kingston Grammar Schools and has clubs in other watersports – principally canoeing, sailing and a skiff club.

== History ==
The rowing club was originally established in Teddington in 1961 for BP employees, hence the club colours of green, yellow and black. In 1993 BP closed its Teddington leisure services site. Walbrook Rowing Club continued independently and acquired the site by pooling resources with the Royal Canoe Club and its associated watersports club, The Skiff Club to become the rowing section of 'Walbrook and Royal Canoe Club (RCC)'. Within weeks Kingston Royals Dragon Boat Racing Club joined the combined organisation.

Walbrook Rowing Club has been a major contender in the junior categories and has had success with their j15 boys in their 2024 season. This comes after their silver medal at the National Schools' Regatta in the J15 4x-, losing out on gold by 88 hundredths of a second. The same crew raced again against Windsor Boys' School Boat Club at the British Rowing Championships and won the gold medal race by a comfortable 11.28 seconds.

The club won another national title at the 2025 British Rowing Club Championships.

== Membership ==
On the transformation of its governing body early in the first decade of the 21st century, Walbrook became the recognised governing body in the sport, an open club for men and women of all backgrounds. Members of Walbrook RC also become members of the Royal Canoe Club (RCC), and have access to all the facilities on the site. Walbrook Rowing Club boat house is in a two-storey building (left of picture) and the RCC meanwhile reconstructed its clubhouse on Trowlock Island.

The rowing club aims to teach beginners to row and has a junior section for ages 12–18. There are a variety of races available to members of the club, and committed members can be expecting to race every other week or so during regatta season.

== Location ==
Walbrook is the first non-tidal club on the weir-controlled Thames. The key feature of the non-tidal Thames compared to complex rules along the Tideway is that navigation is always on the right. In all but exceptional stream conditions, the water resembles the middle sections of a few wide rivers in the UK: long weir-controlled rowing rivers capable of handling more than three large vessels side by side.

== Honours ==
=== British Rowing Club Championships ===
Year	Winning crew/s
2024	Open J15 4x+
2025	Women J14 4x+
2026	Open J15 4x+

== See also ==
- Rowing on the River Thames
- The Skiff Club
