= Kingston Royals Dragon Boat Racing Club =

Dragon boat club in Teddington, England

Kingston Royals Dragon Boat Club
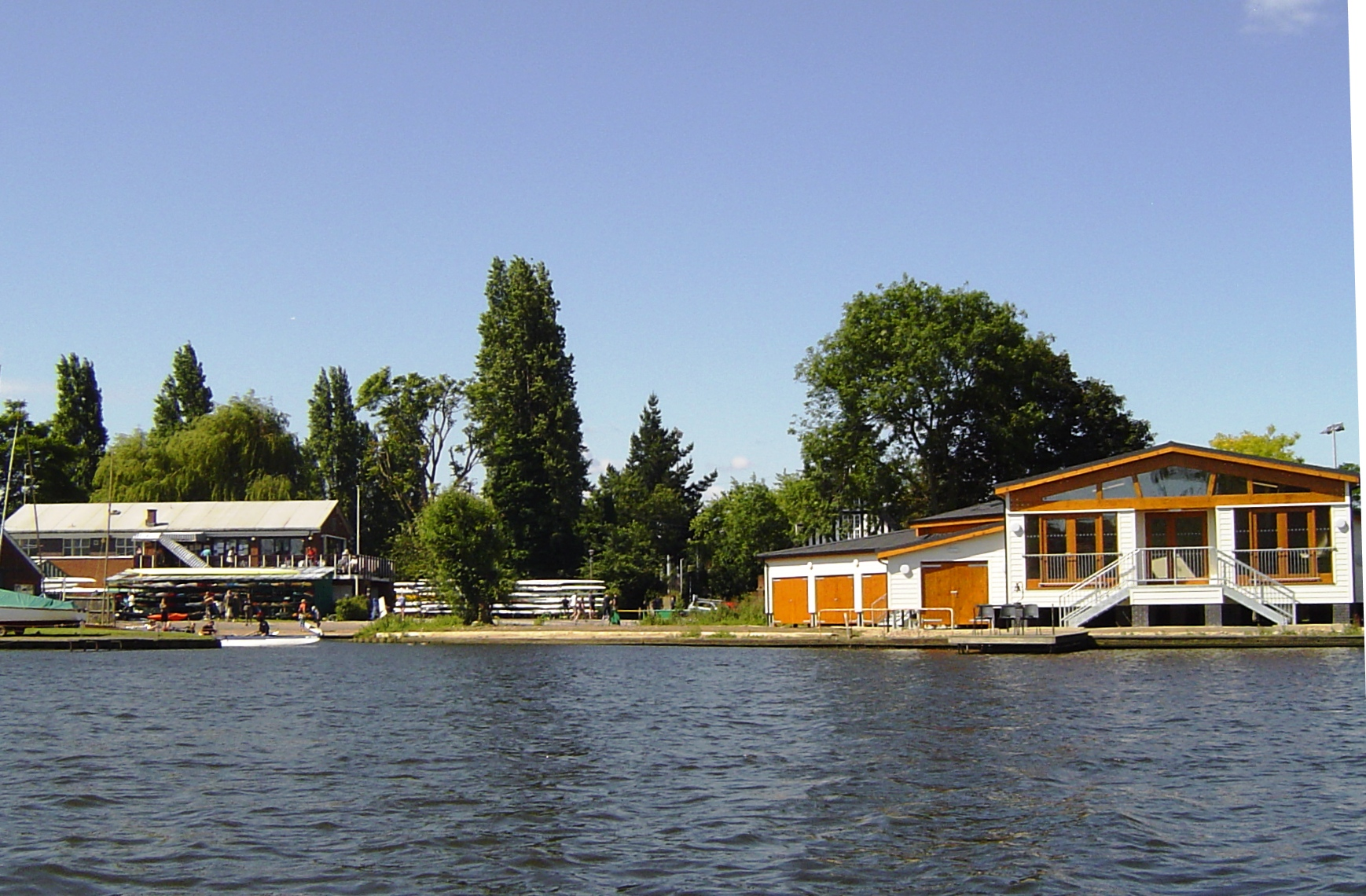
- Location: Teddington
- Coordinates: 51.42402°N 0.30998°W
- Home water: Teddington Lock
- Founded: 1988 (first raced in 1987)
- Affiliations: British Dragon Boat Racing Association
- Website: www.kingstonroyals.com

Distinctions
- British Dragon Boat Racing Association Champion Club 2009

Notable members
- Jock Wishart

Kingston Royals Dragon Boat Club is based in Teddington on the non-tidal Thames.

== History ==
The club was founded in 1988 as the dragon boat racing section of the Royal Canoe Club (RCC), among the inceptive wave nationally. The section was formed from a mixture of RCC members and members of Kingston Rowing Club. The club obtained one of the original teak racing boats brought into the country by the Hong Kong Tourist Association to promote dragon boating in the UK. This boat now donated to a club in Germany, was used for racing and training before the introduction of the new glass fibre racing boats.

The club began competing in the Far East mainly and by 1990 was the first European team to get to the finals of any competition.

In the 1990s, the club never finished below second in any event it entered at the British National Cup; in 1990, 1992, 1993, 1996 and 1998 it completed a "pinkwash" (named for the club's distinctive club colour) of wins in the Open, Mixed and Women's events. Leading members left and four poor years occurred including no races won in 2001 and one British Dragon Boat National League event win for 2002. Momentum restored, and the club is now racing at the highest level of UK racing since promotion to the Premier Division of the British Dragon Boat National League at the end of 2003.

== Honours ==
Kingston Royals often represented Great Britain before the GB teams selection system. The club continues to make selection to the GB teams and a number of club paddlers have regularly represented the country at European and World level. The club celebrated its 20th birthday in October 2008 in a position as Britain's most successful dragon boat club, having won 33 of the 66 national titles thus far of the British Dragon Boat Racing Association.

The Great Britain's Women's coach is based at the club and coaches the club crews.

The club won the British Dragon Boat Racing Association Champion Club award in 2009.

In recent years, the club has re-climbed the National League standings to second: achieved in 2008 and 2009. In 2006 and those years the club won the Women's and Mixed events at the British National Cup.

The club's second crew, known as the Kingston Pretenders and originally an occasional crew, won the Open Plate competition in 2006 and 2009, and was the only secondary crew in the Open Cup competitions in the 2008 National Cup.

== Teams ==
The club now runs teams for both men and women and for beginners to international racers.

== Independence ==
In 2007, the club's being a section of the RCC, the first canoe club to be founded in Britain, formally ended following a reorganisation of the RCC. Kingston Royals officially became a separate club. However, the Club continues to be based at the RCC site in Teddington and links between the two organisations remain strong.
