= Raven's Ait =

Island in the River Thames in Kingston upon Thames, London, England

Coordinates: 51°23′55″N 00°18′40″W

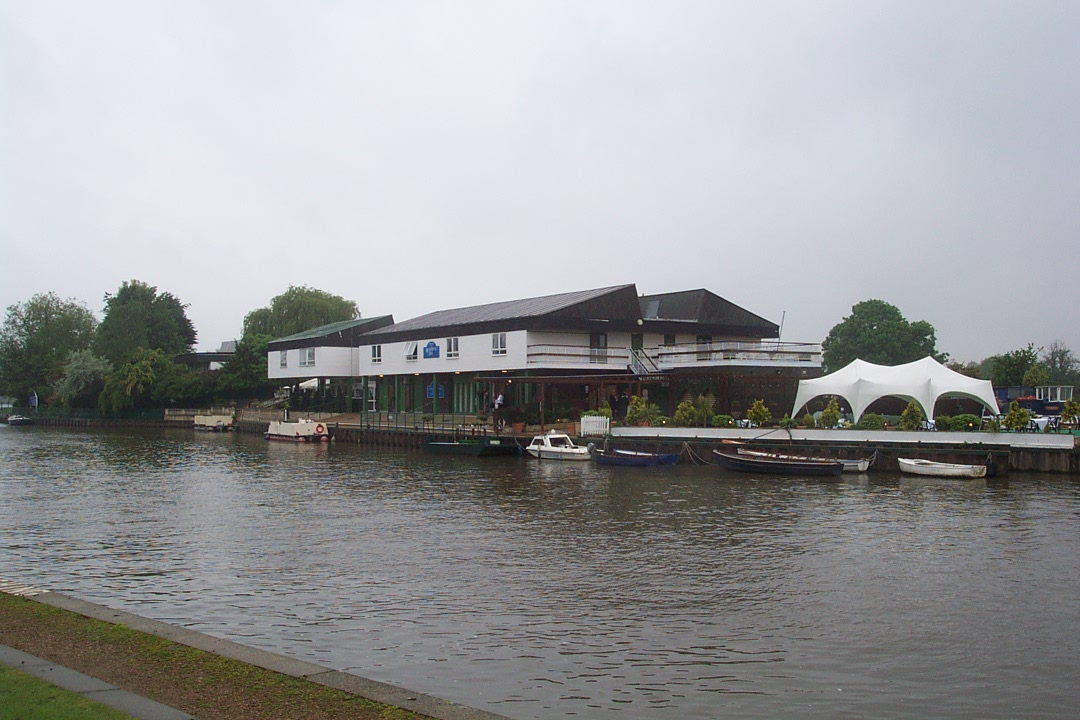
Raven's Ait looking upstream from Queen's Promenade

Raven's Ait shown within Greater London
(grid reference TQ175679)

Raven's Ait is an ait (island) in the Thames between Surbiton, Kingston and Hampton Court Park in the Royal Borough of Kingston upon Thames, London, England, in the reach of the river above Teddington Lock. Used as a boating training centre for many years, Raven's Ait is currently privately run as a catering facility and a conference and wedding venue.

== Geography ==
Raven's Ait is in the centre of the non-tidal reach of the Thames above Teddington Lock, and immediately below Seething Wells.

Access to the island is by ferry from Queen's Promenade on the south bank of the Thames. This is adjacent to the Thames Sailing Club and a small area, once a draw dock, used for transporting goods to the area and the former fresh water works to the south.

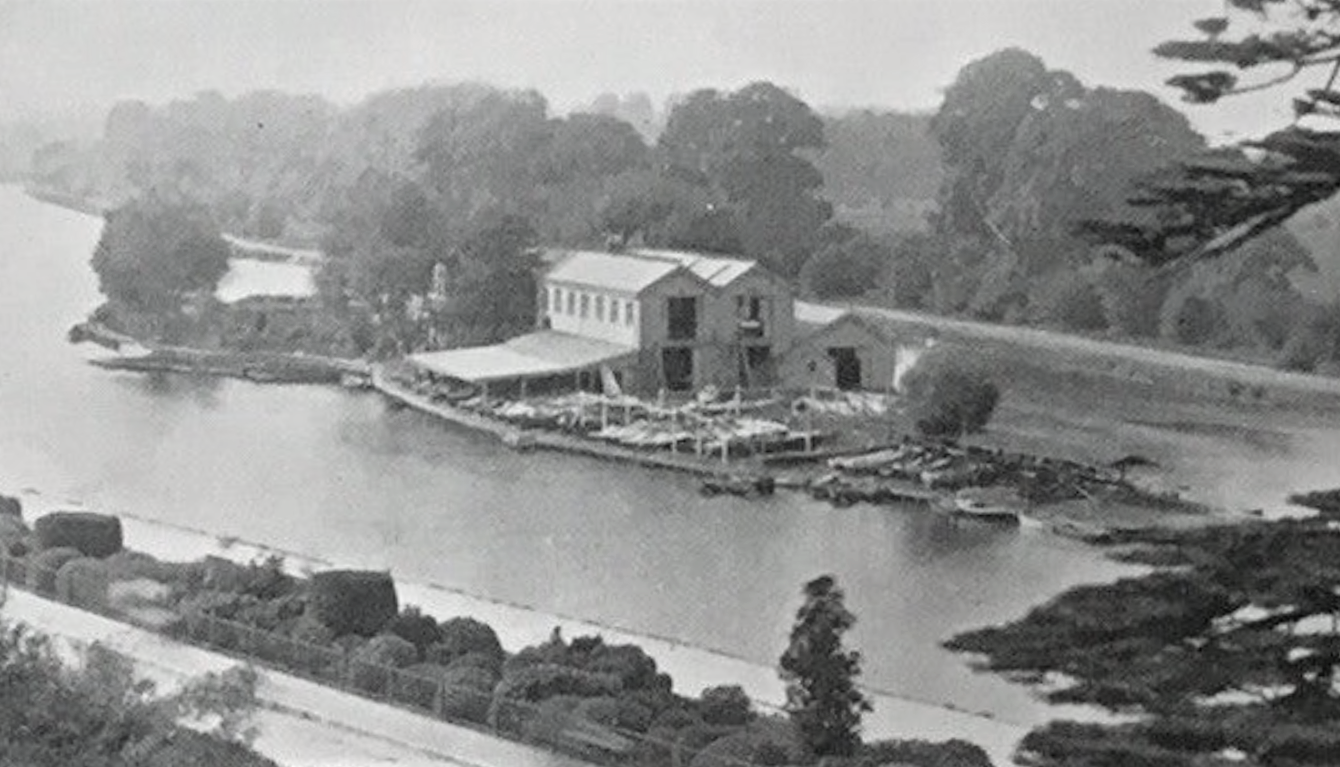
Ravens Ait in 1930s

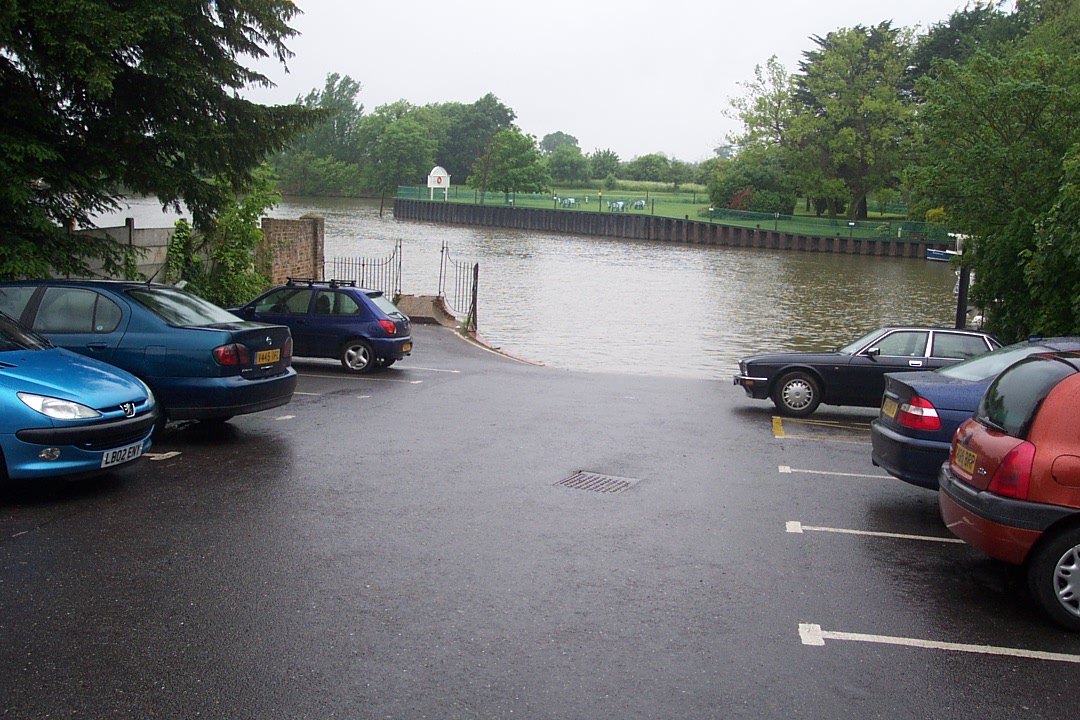
The draw dock

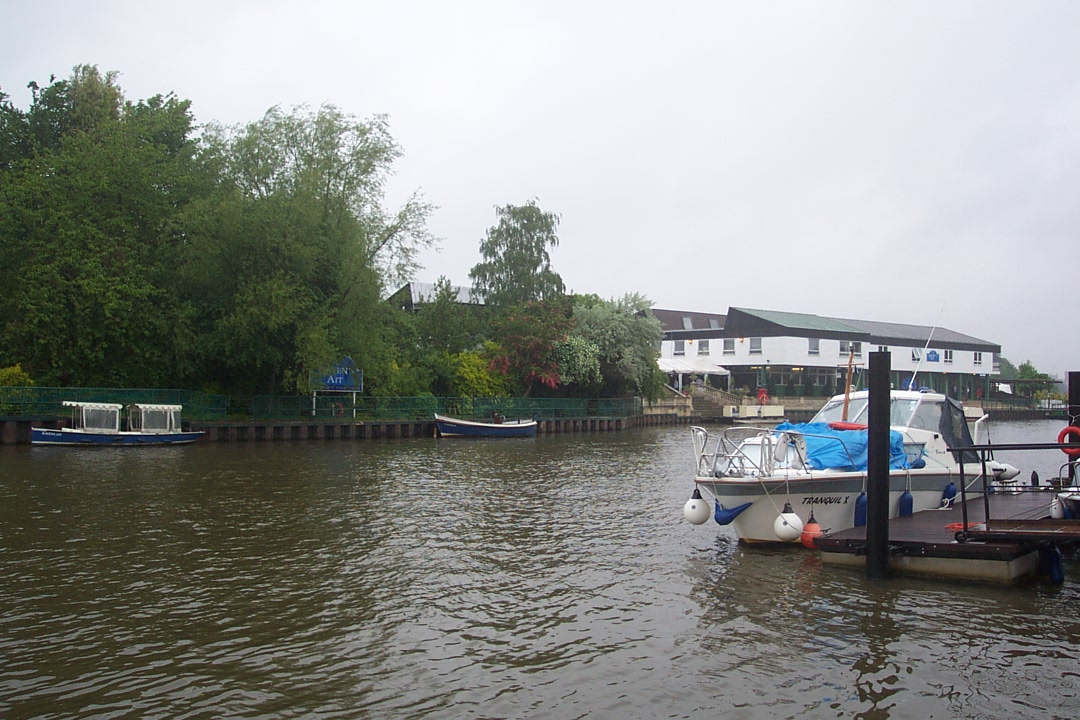
Looking downstream from the draw dock

== History ==
Raven's Ait is a possible site for the signing of documents that led to the ratification of 1215 Magna Carta.

In more recent times, the island has been used as a boating centre. Kingston Rowing Club, founded in 1858, occupied Raven's Ait for 76 years before moving in 1935 to Kingston, where it is now based in Canbury Gardens. Raven's Ait was then used by Theatre and Cinema Equipment Ltd as a warehouse, until bought in 1944 and presented to the Sea Cadet Corps by an anonymous supporter, for use as a river headquarters. It was the location of the Corps' first national regatta in September 1954.

In 1955, The Navy League opened TS Neptune on Raven's Ait to teach sailing, canoeing and boating skills to members of the Sea Cadet Corps, the Girls' Nautical Training Corps. Run with naval discipline, it had day facilities for 200 boys or girls and sleeping accommodation for up to 105 boys. The facilities were also made available to other youth organisations and to schools. Prince Philip, Duke of Edinburgh, visited the island in 1958. Originally the island's buildings were wooden clad "Sea Cadet Blue", with old–style dormitories. In 1971 the entire accommodation, except the superintendent's house, was rebuilt by Haymills Construction, replacing all the old wooden structures with today's island buildings. During the rebuilding, a small number of activities were carried on downstream of Kingston upon Thames, at the Albany Park sailing base opposite The Royal Canoe Club, with instructors commuting daily by boat. The Navy League closed the centre in October 1975 due to escalating running costs.

Purchased by the Inner London Education Authority, the island's facilities were used as a youth and community workers training centre and a water sports activity facility by London schools.

In May 1989, the former Inner London Education Authority sold the island to Kingston Borough Council, which began operating the property directly as a water activity centre and training facility. In January 1993, Kingston Borough Council agreed to a management contract, of approximately 4 years, to Contemporary Leisure plc, in which the company managed the property as a center for water sports and more general functions. Before the lease was completed, Contemporary Leisure plc went into liquidation and the management agreement, that had been granted to it in 1993, was surrendered to the Council in December 1994.

The council leased the island to Hartogh and Associates Ltd for use as a conference and wedding centre, operated by the Ravens Ait Hall Management Company Ltd, incorporated on 29 August 1995, which later went into administration and closed in December 2008. On 31 December 2008, when its lease expired, the council took back possession of the property from Hartogh and Associates Ltd.

On the weekend of 21–23 February 2009, squatters occupied the island with the declared aim of turning its facilities into an eco conference centre. Kingston Council, who owned the freehold, took court action and the occupants were evicted on 1 May 2009. According to local media reports, during their stay the squatters had used as much electric power as would supply 45 homes. However this was disputed by the squatters who said that this was because before they arrived large industrial refrigerators and other appliances had been left running by the owners.

Since 2009 the island has been used mainly as a venue for weddings and corporate events.

== Activities as a Navy League watersports venue ==
Raven's Ait was accredited by the Royal Yachting Association and by the British Canoe Union to conduct training in their respective disciplines. It also provided a semi-permanent mooring for Sparkle, a catamaran designed by Angus Primrose to be sailed by persons of restricted physical ability and mobility.

=== Motor boating skills ===
The boats were almost all naval stock, diesel powered:

- A 25-foot naval cutter (Twin-cylinder diesel), centre pseudo-cabin housing engine
- Several "Viking" open tenders (single-cylinder air-cooled diesel) with poor handling
- A Workboat with a cuddy, acquired from Haymills Construction after the rebuild, similar to the Vikings, but with better handling
- "Number 8", a small clinker-built smart, stubby, open launch, about 16-foot LOA with relatively low freeboard (Single-cylinder Lister air-cooled diesel)

=== Pulling (rowing) ===
Basic pulling skills were taught, usually to Sea Cadets, either in the ASC or in one of a pair of admiralty whalers (a clinker built pulling boat of approximately 28' LOA, slim beam, designed for naval pulling races, but originally a practical ship's boat).

=== Sailing ===
Boats were a mixture of typical naval stock and somewhat strengthened "ordinary" dinghies.

The fleets were:

- ASCs - the "Admiralty Sailing Craft" 16 foot gaff rigged dinghy, sometimes known as the GRP16, moored alongside the island.
- Bosuns, allegedly able to be swung out from Her Majesty's ships on a torpedo hoist in the middle of any ocean
- Cadets, a class of sailing dinghy designed to be sailed by two children up to the age of 17
- Coypus, a redoubtable short, fat, slow gaff rigged dinghy
- Fireballs, kept at Island Barn Reservoir for trapeze training
- GP14s, heavily strengthened
- Puffin Pacers, a light Jack Holt design made by Polycell Prout with a tendency to scoop up a large volume of water over the leeward quarter when hardening up.

=== Schools which used Raven's Ait ===
A number of schools used Raven's Ait for watersports under the Navy League, including:

- Epsom College
- Stockwell Manor
- Forest Hill School
- Glyn County Grammar School
- Sutton County Grammar School

== See also ==
- Islands in the River Thames

- Islands in the River Thames listed in order upstream from the sea.

== Notes ==
Next island upstream	River Thames	Next island downstream
Thames Ditton Island	Raven's Ait	Steven's Eyot
