= Swan Island, London =

Private mooring island in the Thames at Twickenham, England

Coordinates: 51°26′21″N 00°19′52″W

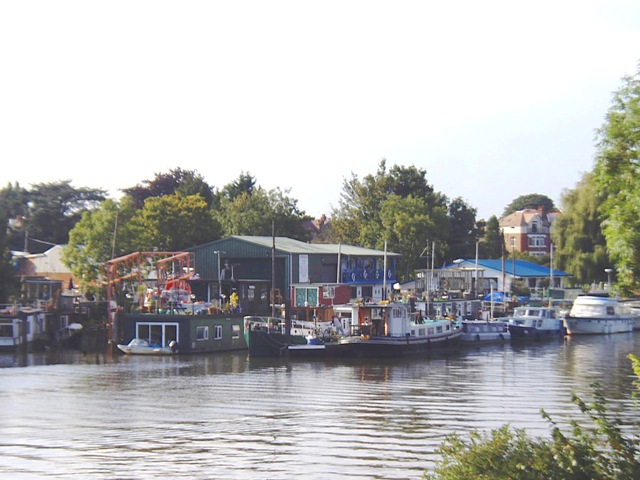

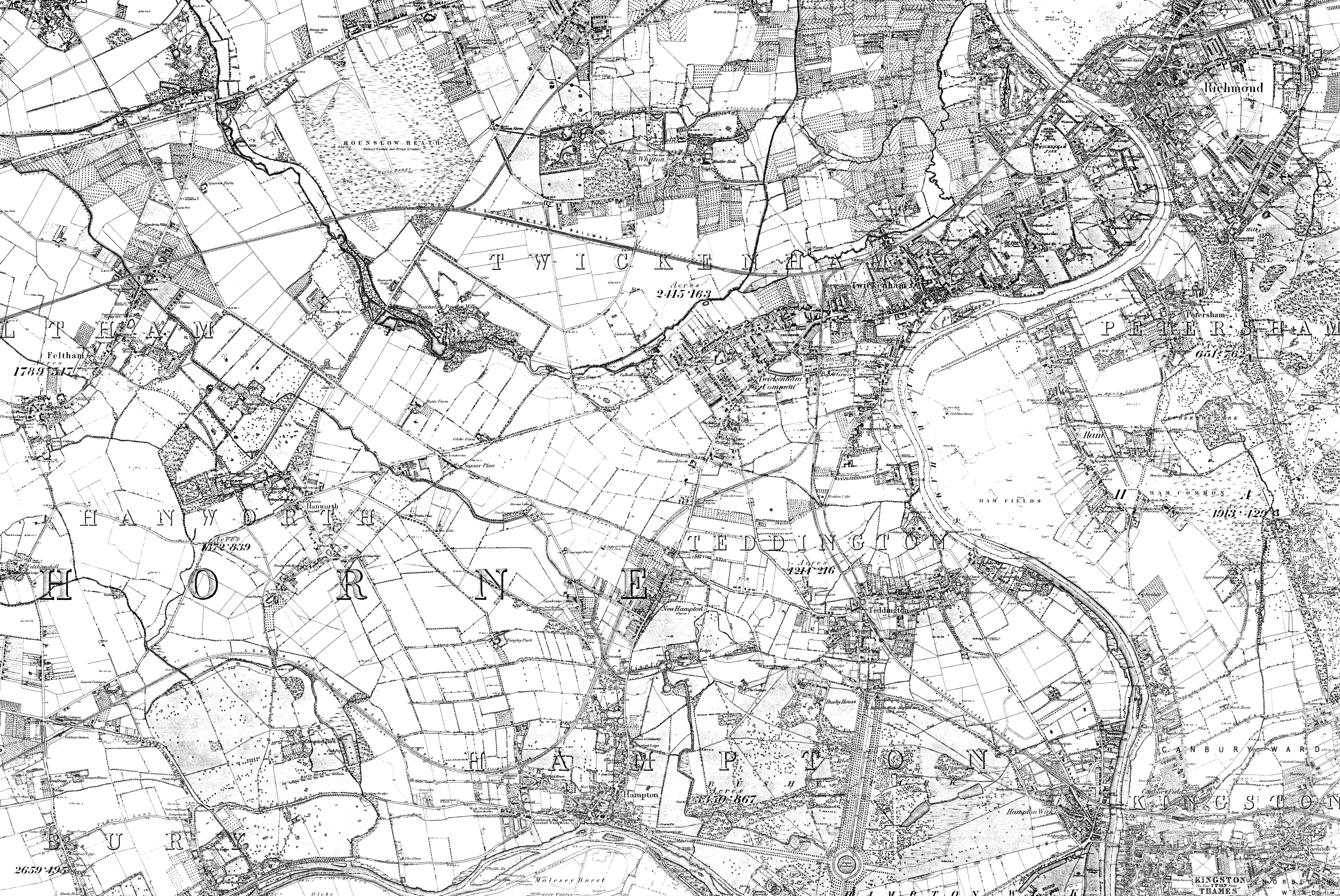
In 1871 to 1882 OS maps 1st series at 1:10560: Surrey. Click to expand/see wider.

Swan Island is a private mooring island in the Thames at Twickenham, in the London Borough of Richmond upon Thames, London, England. It is on the Tideway (Note: Thus patrolled by the Port of London Authority, not the EA) about 3/4 mile (1.2 km) north of and thus below Teddington Lock.

The island has a commercial boatyard in addition to residential mooring for boats. It is connected to the Twickenham bank by a small bridge, which is suitable for vehicles as well as foot traffic.

Originally an osier bed, it measured 1/4 acre (0.10 ha) per Ordnance Survey maps of 1897 and 1898.

A larger island stood north-west which has become the playground, bowling green, café and park Radnor Gardens, Strawberry Hill/Vale.

== See also ==
- Islands in the River Thames

- Islands in the River Thames listed in order upstream from the sea.

== See also ==
- Islands in the River Thames

Next island upstream	River Thames	Next island downstream
Trowlock Island	Swan Island, London	Eel Pie Island
