= Steven's Eyot =

Island in the River Thames

Coordinates: 51°25′12″N 00°18′22″W

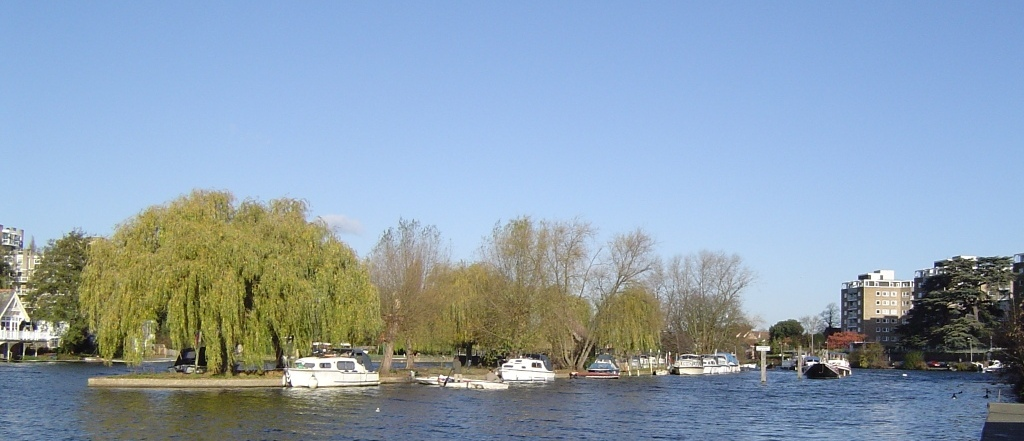
Steven's Eyot from the Surrey side, looking downstream

Steven's Eyot (or Steven's Ait) is a narrow ait (island) in the River Thames in the Royal Borough of Kingston upon Thames, London, England, on the non-tidal reach above Teddington Lock.

== Geography ==
Steven's Eyot is 660 m (720 yd) below Kingston Railway Bridge and its southern tip is opposite the north of the boating area of Kingston Rowing Club shared by Tiffin School Boat Club on the east, Surrey, bank in Canbury Gardens. On the west, Middlesex, bank are the houses, meadows, apartments and three boathouses of Broom Park, Teddington. A very much smaller eyot to its north leads the Ordnance Survey to record the island as a pair, "Steven's Eyots".

== History ==
The Ordnance Survey map of 1875 shows that the eyot comprised four islets and on the map of 1896 it is marked as Tathim's island. Stevens was the family name of a boatman who lived in a cottage that stood in what became Canbury Gardens. The present name was in use on the 1913 Ordnance Survey map. The island now forms part of a conservation area.

== Management ==
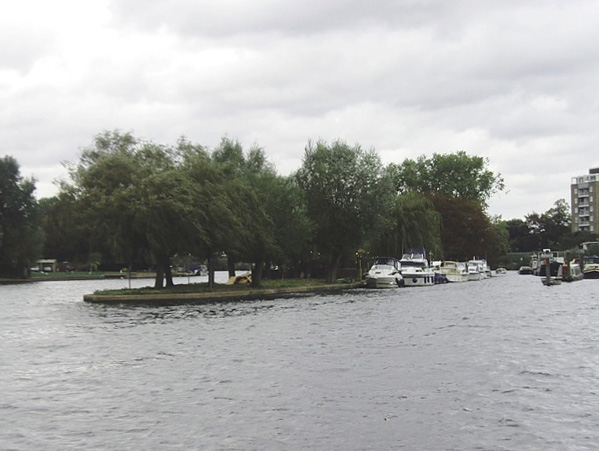
Steven's Ait, 4 October 2008

River traffic is directed to the Middlesex side because of posts and mooring on the Surrey side (east here). The island is the base of the Small Boat Club (SBC), a not-for-profit motorboats club formed in 1953 run by the members for the members, using its carved out basin in the north and reinforced moorings on all sides. The SBC has leased the island from the Thames Conservancy (now the Environment Agency) since 1960, giving only Small Boat Club members the right to permanent mooring on the island. Kingston Council granted the SBC permission to erect and have exclusive rights a jetty on the Surrey bank towpath, operational since May 1984.

== See also ==
- Canbury Gardens
- Islands in the River Thames

- Islands in the River Thames listed in order upstream from the sea.

== Notes and references ==
Next island upstream	River Thames	Next island downstream
Raven's Ait	Steven's Eyot	Trowlock Island
