= Kingston Power Station, London =

Former coal-fired generating station

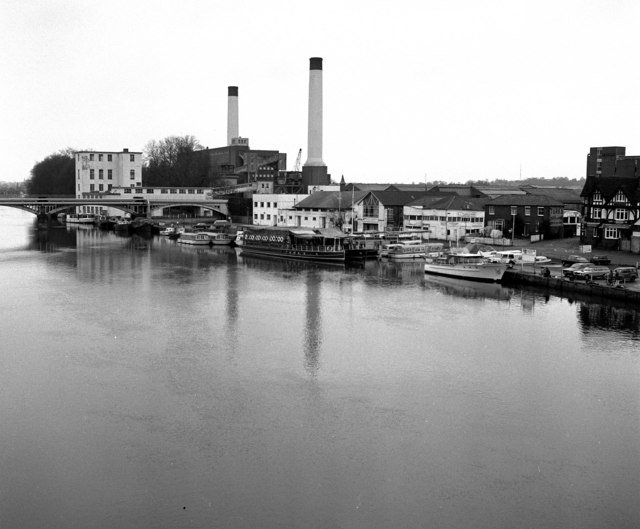
- Kingston Power Station from the south-west in 1982
- Country: England
- Location: Greater London
- Coordinates: 51.415400°N 0.306100°W
- Status: Decommissioned
- Commission date: 1893, 1948
- Decommission date: 1980
- Owner: As operator
- Operators: British Electricity Authority (1948–1955); Central Electricity Authority (1955–1957); Central Electricity Generating Board (1958–1981)

Thermal power station
- Primary fuel: Coal
- Chimneys: 2 (215 ft)
- Cooling towers: None
- Cooling source: River water

Power generation
- Units operational: 4 × 30 MW
- Units decommissioned: All
- Nameplate capacity: 117 MW
- Annual net output: See text

External links
- Commons: Related media on Commons

Kingston Power Station was a coal-fired generating station on the Thames in Kingston upon Thames, Surrey (later Greater London). It ceased generating in 1980 and was demolished in 1994.

== History ==
The first station was built in 1893, with an original capacity of 225 kW. New generating equipment was added as the demand for electricity increased. The generating capacity, maximum load, and electricity generated and sold was as follows:

The A station eventually closed in 1959. A new 'B' station was planned before World War II, opening in 1948. The Thames was used both for coal supply and ash removal, and as a source of cooling water. The new station was the first to be opened following nationalisation of the power industry, with the official opening by King George VI, the first station to receive such an honour since Barking in 1924.

Kingston A generating capacity, load and electricity produced and sold
Year	Generating capacity, MW	Maximum load, MW	Electricity generated, GWh	Electricity sold, GWh
1912/3	0.860	0.670	1.332	1.152
1918/9	2.00	0.95	2.175	1.608
1919/20	2.00	1.25	2.208	1.848
1923/4	4.50	2.00	4.081	2.394
1936/7	11.75	7.293	None (30.711 purchased)	19.140

=== Technical specification ===
In 1923 the plant comprised two 1,250 kW turbo-alternators, these were supplied from the boiler plant which produced a total of 66,000 lb/hr (8.32 kg/s) of steam. Electricity was available at 3-phase AC, 50 Hz at 440, 415 & 240V and single phase AC, 77 Hz at 210 & 105V. In 1923 the station generated 3.448 GWh of electricity, some of this was used in the plant, the total amount sold was 1.888 GWh. The revenue from sales of current was £39,623, this gave a surplus of revenue over expenses of £21,124. The station was extended in April 1930 with the addition of a 50,000-lb/hr boiler feeding a 3,750-kW turbo-alternator.

The installed plant in 1938 consisted of the following Brush Lungstrom sets

2 x 1,250 kW, 1 x 2,000 kW, 1 x 3,500 and 1 x 3,750 kW

Kingston B power station was opened in October 1948 with the first of 4 × 30 MW British Thomson-Houston turbo-alternators and a 3 MW house set giving a generating capacity of 123 MW. The second unit was commissioned in January 1949. Coal was supplied by barge from the river Thames and fed direct to the boiler bunkers or placed in a store area which could hold 30, 000 Tonnes. The six chain grate stoker Stirling boilers each had a steam capacity of 260,000 lb/hr using 16 Tonnes of coal/hour. The steam conditions at the turbine stop valve were 600 psi (41.4 bar) and 454 °C. Exhaust gases escaped to the atmosphere through two 250ft high chimneys.

The overall thermal efficiency of the station in 1966 was 21.12 per cent.

Electricity output from Kingston power station was as follows.

Kingston annual electricity output GWh.

View source data.

=== Closure ===
Generation ceased on 27 October 1980 with a generating capacity of 117 megawatts. The station was eventually demolished, despite calls for preservation as a power museum. The two 250-foot chimneys were demolished in 1994.

== See also ==
- Canbury Gardens
