= Skiff Championships Regatta =

Regatta logo

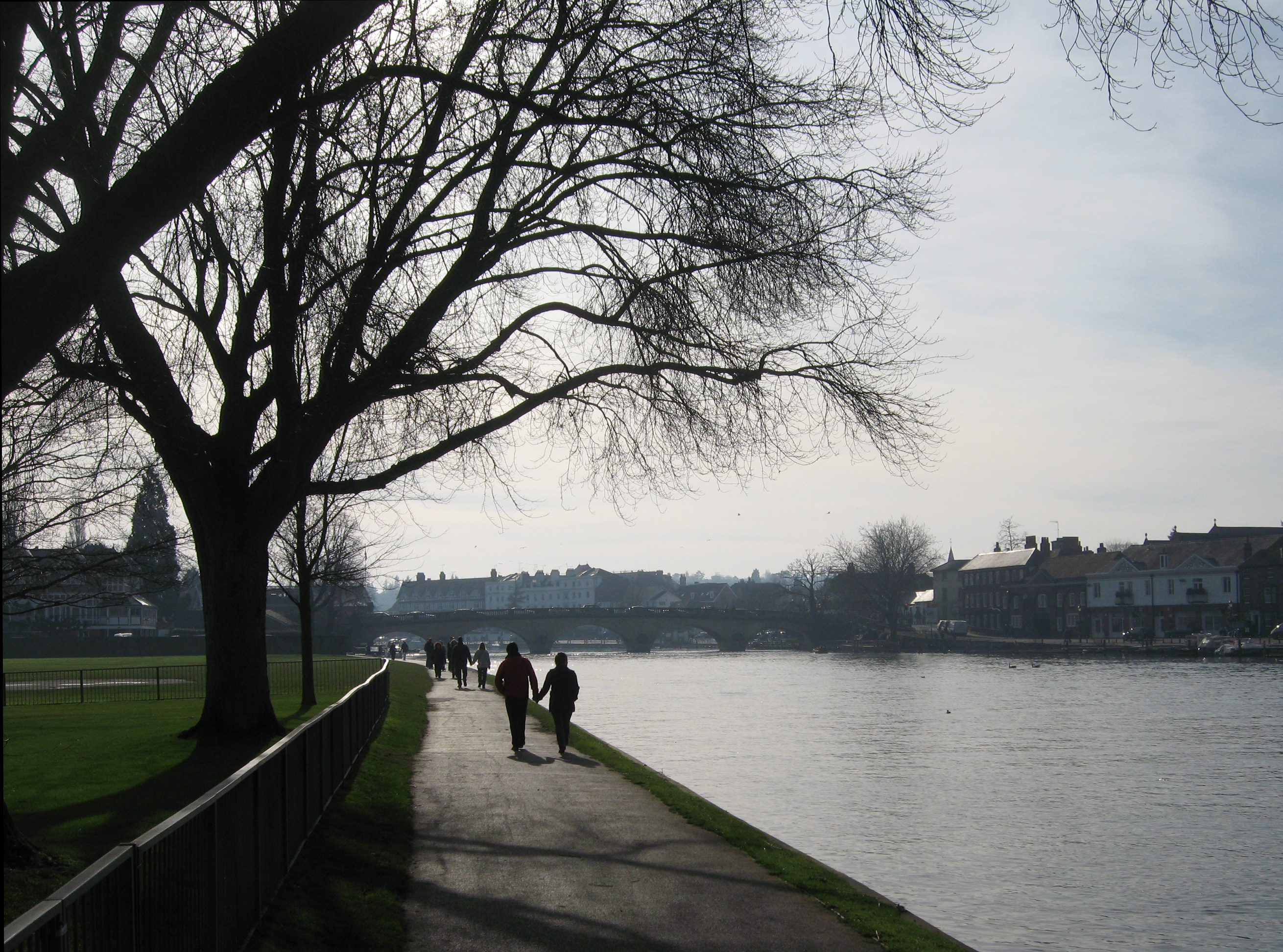
An out of season shot shows where the regatta course starts.

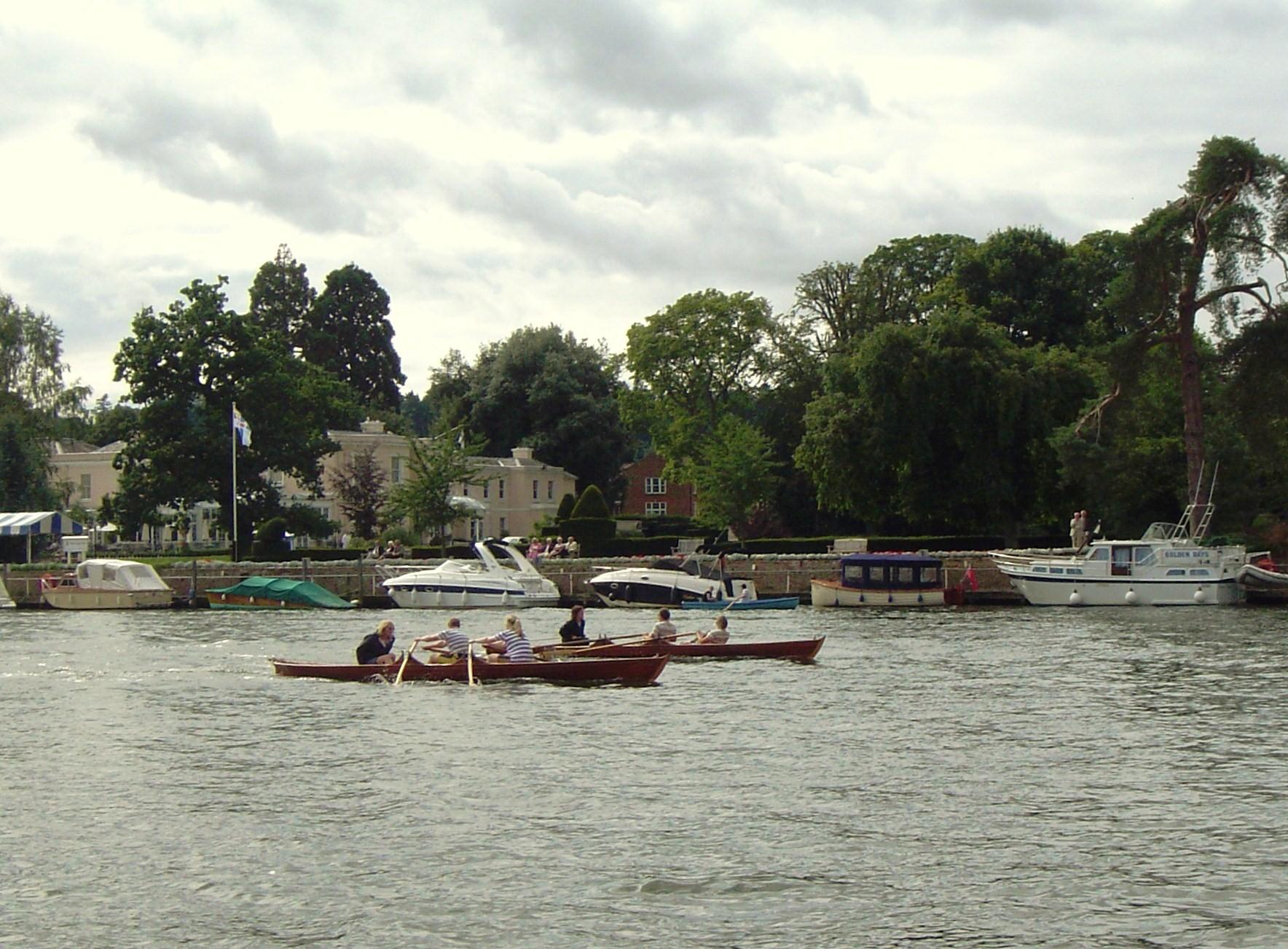
Championship Mixed Doubles final shortly after the start

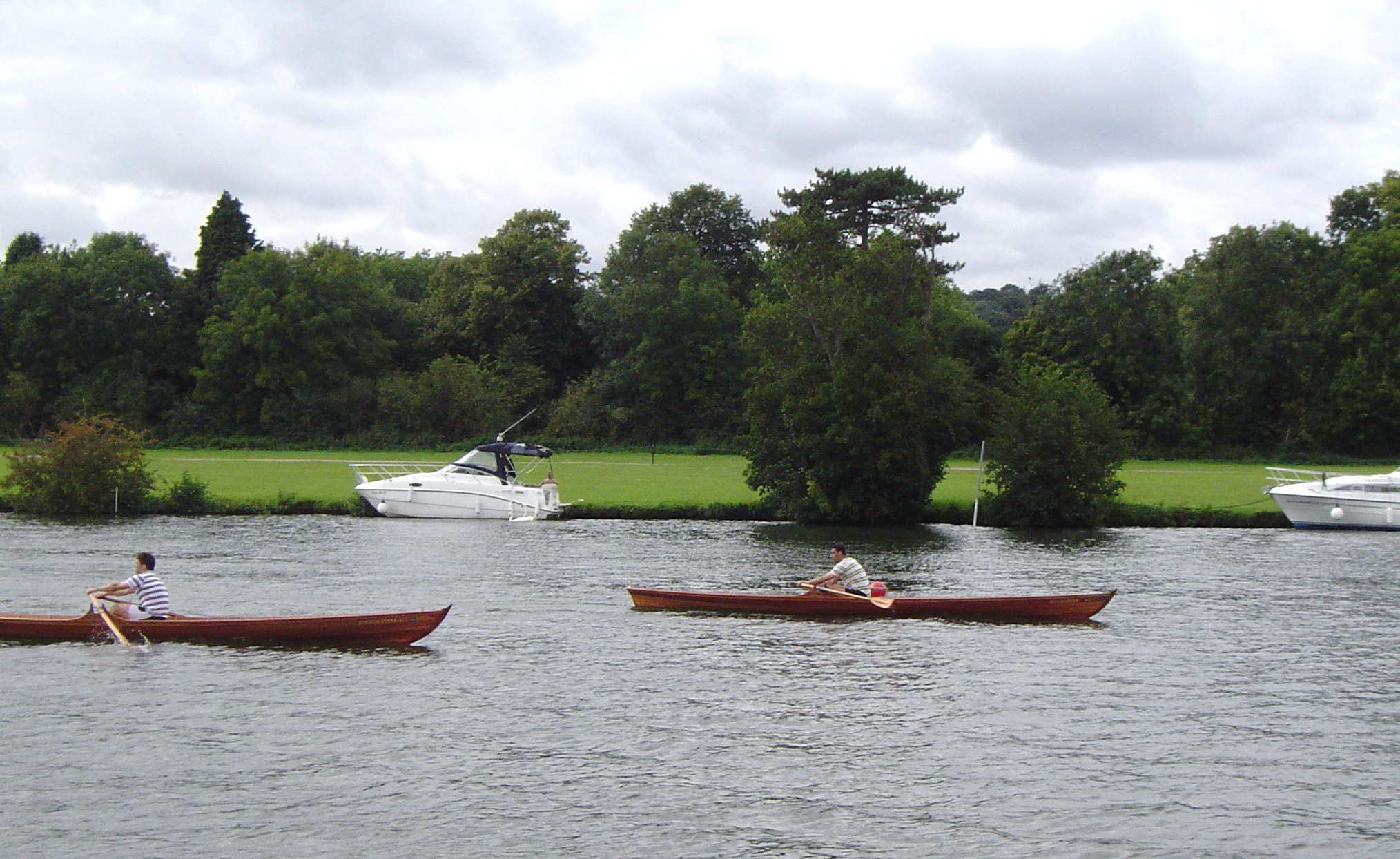
Finish of the Championship Gent's Singles final

The Skiff Championships Regatta is the premier skiff racing regatta on the River Thames in England. It is held annually at Henley on the Sunday of August Bank Holiday weekend.

== Events and course ==
The regatta is run under the rules of the Skiff Racing Association and there are five Championship events:

- Gentlemen's Double Sculls for the Albany Challenge Cup
- Gentlemen's Single Sculls for the Pulman Challenge Cup
- Mixed Double Sculls for the Newman Challenge Cup
- Ladies Double Sculls for the Ladies Double Challenge Cup
- Ladies Single Sculls for the Beverley Challenge Cup

There is also a full regatta programme for all other status levels

The course is approximately 750 metres down stream, starting just downstream of Henley Bridge and finishing at the Remenham Club clubhouse, whence the regatta is organised. The Upper Thames Rowing Club facilities are also made available for the regatta.

Many former champions have been rowers in Great Britain Olympic and National teams including Penny Chuter who won 21 skiff championships and Elise Laverick.

== History ==
The regatta was originally the Teddington Reach Regatta held at Teddington, which was founded in 1892 as the Teddington Reach Aquatic Sports. At that time there were events for canoeing, dongola racing, tug-of-war in punts and swimming as well as the skiff racing. The Gentlemen's Double Sculls event at that regatta was nominated as the Championship of the Thames in 1897 and by 1906 the Gentlemen's Single Sculls, the Mixed Double Sculls and Ladies' Double Sculls were accorded Championship status. The Ladies' Single Sculls were introduced in 1957. The course was 1000 metres upstream from Teddington Lock to Steven's Eyot.

In the 1970s the regatta enclosure at Kingston upon Thames became unavailable because of redevelopment. The last regatta was held at Teddington in 1972, and in 1974 it moved to its present site at Henley to become the Skiff Championships Regatta.

Past and present Presidents of the regatta are

- H Pullman
- F S Lowe
- J E Edgecombe
- C W Wise
- K E Foat
- F J Rosewell ( –1974)
- V A C Wood (1975–1992)
- R F Thompson (1993–2002)
- D W Gramolt (2003–2014)
- D P Hudson (2015-2017)
- D Taylor (2018- )

== See also ==
- Rowing on the River Thames
- The Skiff Club
