= Kingston Rowing Club =

English rowing club on the River Thames

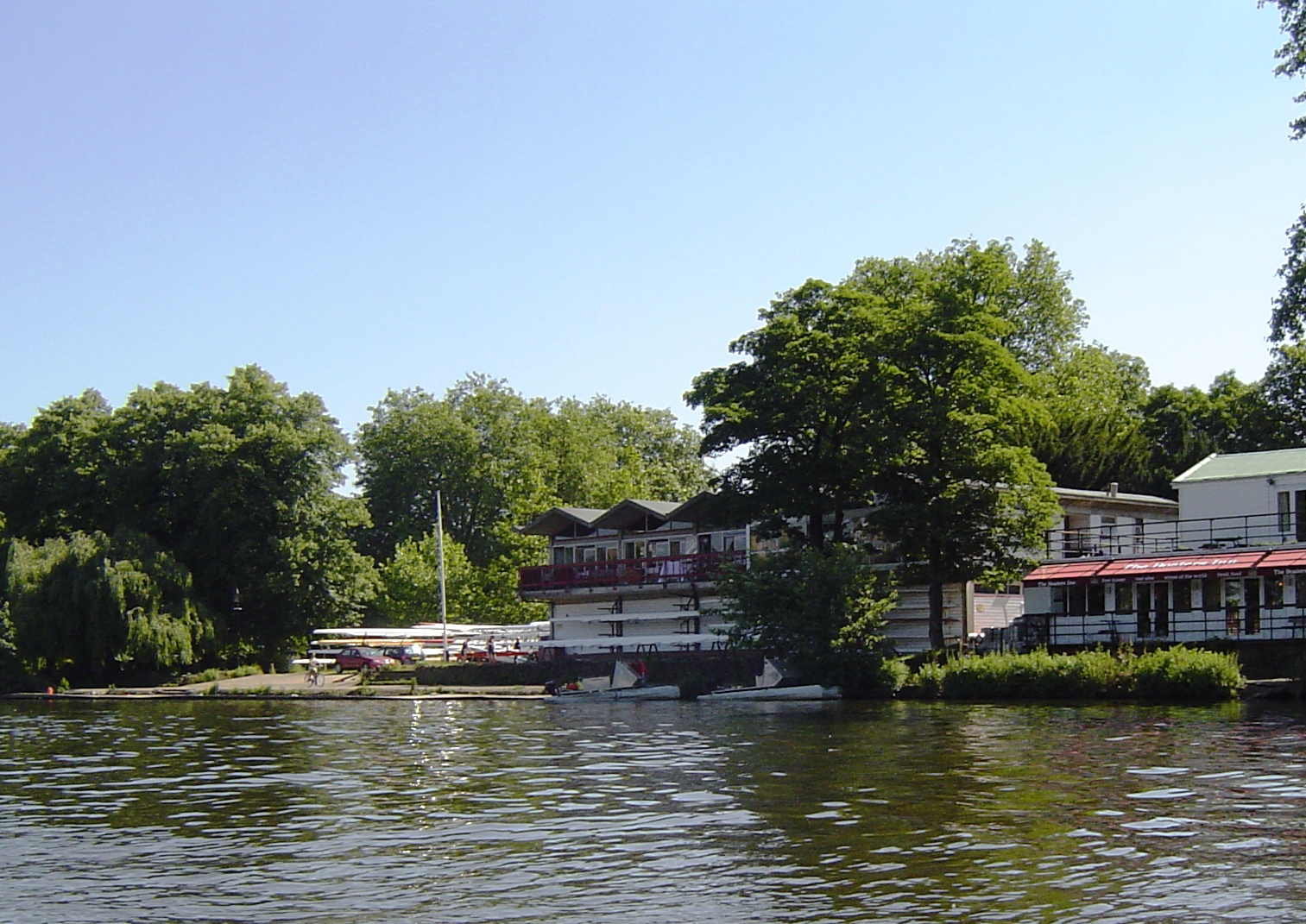

- Location: Kingston upon Thames
- Coordinates: 51°25′8″N 0°18′20″W
- Home water: Teddington Lock
- Founded: 1858
- Affiliations: British Rowing boat code - KRC
- Website: www.kingstonrc.co.uk

Events
- Kingston Regatta, Kingston Head, Kingston Small Boats Head

Kingston Rowing Club (KRC) is a rowing club in England, founded in 1858 and a member club of British Rowing.

The club is located on the River Thames at Kingston upon Thames, downstream and north-east of Kingston Bridge and Kingston Railway Bridge. On a long wide stretch, its rowers and scullers have the final and the second longest section of the weir-controlled river. Kingston have produced a significant list of international level oarsmen and oarswomen throughout its history and has won events at the British Rowing Championships and Henley Royal Regatta through the years.

Kingston Rowing Club is the supporting club for Kingston Regatta which is held above Kingston Bridge. Kingston organises Kingston Head of the River Race which is a warm-up for the national Head of the River Race on the Championship Course on the following weekend.

== History ==
The club started at Messenger's Boathouse, Kingston and was housed there for three years before moving upstream. From 1861 to 1935 the club was based above the bridges on Raven's Ait in Surbiton to the south. In 1935 the club moved downstream to premises known as the Albany Boathouse then moved to its purpose-built facilities in Canbury Gardens in 1968.

=== Notable members ===
- Edward Corrie
- Andy Holmes
- Gilbert Kennedy
- Courtenay Knollys
- Dick Offer
- Jack Offer
- Rebecca Romero
- Pongo Scarf VC
- R C Sherriff
- Denis Spotswood
- A A Stuart
- Douglas Stuart
- Julian Clary
- Kieran West
- Tim Crooks
- Dinghy Young DFC*

== Facilities ==
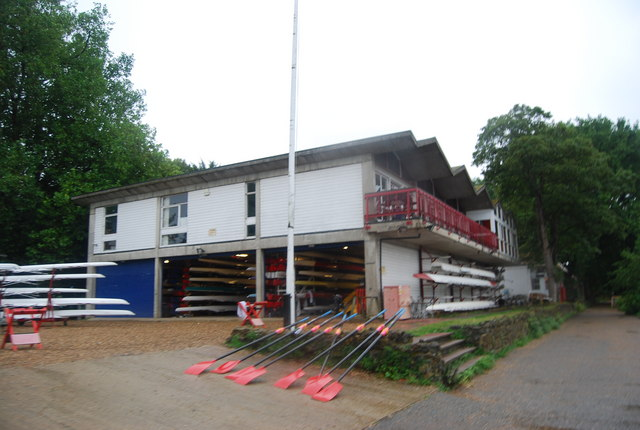
Kingston Rowing Club Boathouse

The club is the racing shell rowing club in Kingston upon Thames, but also provides training boats for less competitive rowing. It is on the Kingston Reach which runs between Molesey Lock by Hampton Court down to Teddington Lock; The reach is a long 4.82 miles (7.76 km) V-shaped stretch of the Thames and is the final and second longest section of the River Thames — the longest reach being Wallingford reach at 6.5 miles (10.5 km) in Oxfordshire.

It shares the long, wide stretch with three sailing clubs upstream and downstream, the Royal Canoe Club (and The Skiff Club), Walbrook Rowing Club (the rowing club of Teddington), and school clubs of Tiffin, Kingston Grammar, and Surbiton High schools.

== Kingston Students Rowing Club ==
Kingston Students Rowing Club (KSRC) was founded in 1972 as the Kingston Polytechnic Boat Club (KPBC). After 1992, Kingston Polytechnic was granted university status and the club changed its name to Kingston University Boat Club (KUBC).

In 2011, Kingston University Boat Club (KUBC) became Kingston Students Rowing Club (KSRC). KRC took over the training and coaching from Kingston University, maintain its fleet of boats and acquired its launches. University students receive automatic membership of KRC and still represent the university at the British Universities and Colleges Sport (BUCS) Regatta and in the University Indoor Rowing Series.

== Annual events ==
The club organises Kingston Head of the River Race which is a warm-up for the national Head of the River Race on the Championship Course on the following weekend. The organisation is associated with Kingston Regatta (formerly Kingston Amateur Regatta) since the club's founding – the regatta predates it by a year.

The club has a regular social calendar and Remenham Club rules entitle all established members to join to the social club which is at Henley on Thames, having one of its course-side venues, in the past having contributed to its funds in this case as a founder member.

== Honours ==
=== Henley Royal Regatta ===
Year	Races won
1863	Wyfold Challenge Cup
1864	Grand Challenge Cup, Wyfold Challenge Cup
1865	Grand Challenge Cup, Wyfold Challenge Cup
1866	Silver Goblets, Wyfold Challenge Cup
1867	Silver Goblets, Wyfold Challenge Cup
1868	Wyfold Challenge Cup
1870	Silver Goblets
1873	Silver Goblets
1877	Wyfold Challenge Cup
1878	Wyfold Challenge Cup
1883	Wyfold Challenge Cup
1884	Stewards' Challenge Cup
1885	Wyfold Challenge Cup
1890	Wyfold Challenge Cup
1897	Thames Challenge Cup, Wyfold Challenge Cup
1898	Wyfold Challenge Cup
1903	Wyfold Challenge Cup
1909	Diamond Challenge Sculls
1936	Silver Goblets & Nickalls' Challenge Cup
1969	Britannia Challenge Cup
1978	Britannia Challenge Cup
1981	Silver Goblets & Nickalls' Challenge Cup, Prince Philip Challenge Cup
1982	Women's Invitation Double Sculls+
1983	Prince Philip Challenge Cup, Queen Mother Challenge Cup
2008	Visitors' Challenge Cup+

+composite

=== Recent British champions ===
Year	Winning crew/s
2000	Women 2-c, Women 8+c
2001	Women 4-, Women L4-
2002	Women L4-
2003	Women 2-
2023	Women's Junior 16 4x
2025	Open club 4+

c-composite

== See also ==
- Rowing on the River Thames
