= Trowlock Island =

Island in the River Thames

Coordinates: 51°25′30″N 00°18′33″W

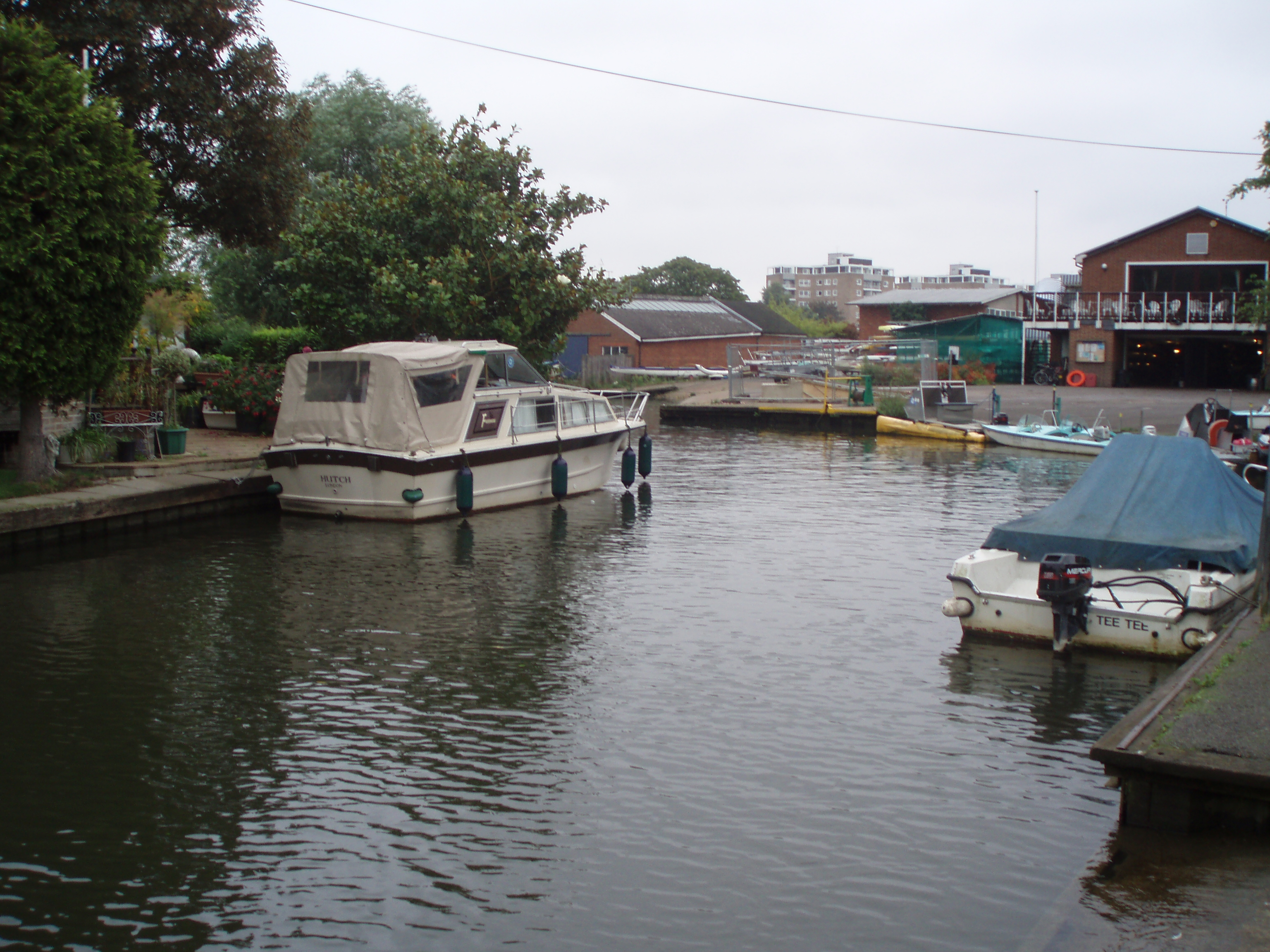
This corner on the left of the island faces the link to the mainland, a chain pulley on a pile-sheeted, concrete wharf and faces the combined Royal Canoe Club and Walbrook Rowing Club.

Trowlock Island is a residential island in the River Thames 450 metres (490 yd) upstream of Teddington Lock on the non-tidal Kingston reach less than 10 metres from the northern bank, in the London Borough of Richmond upon Thames, England.

== Geography ==
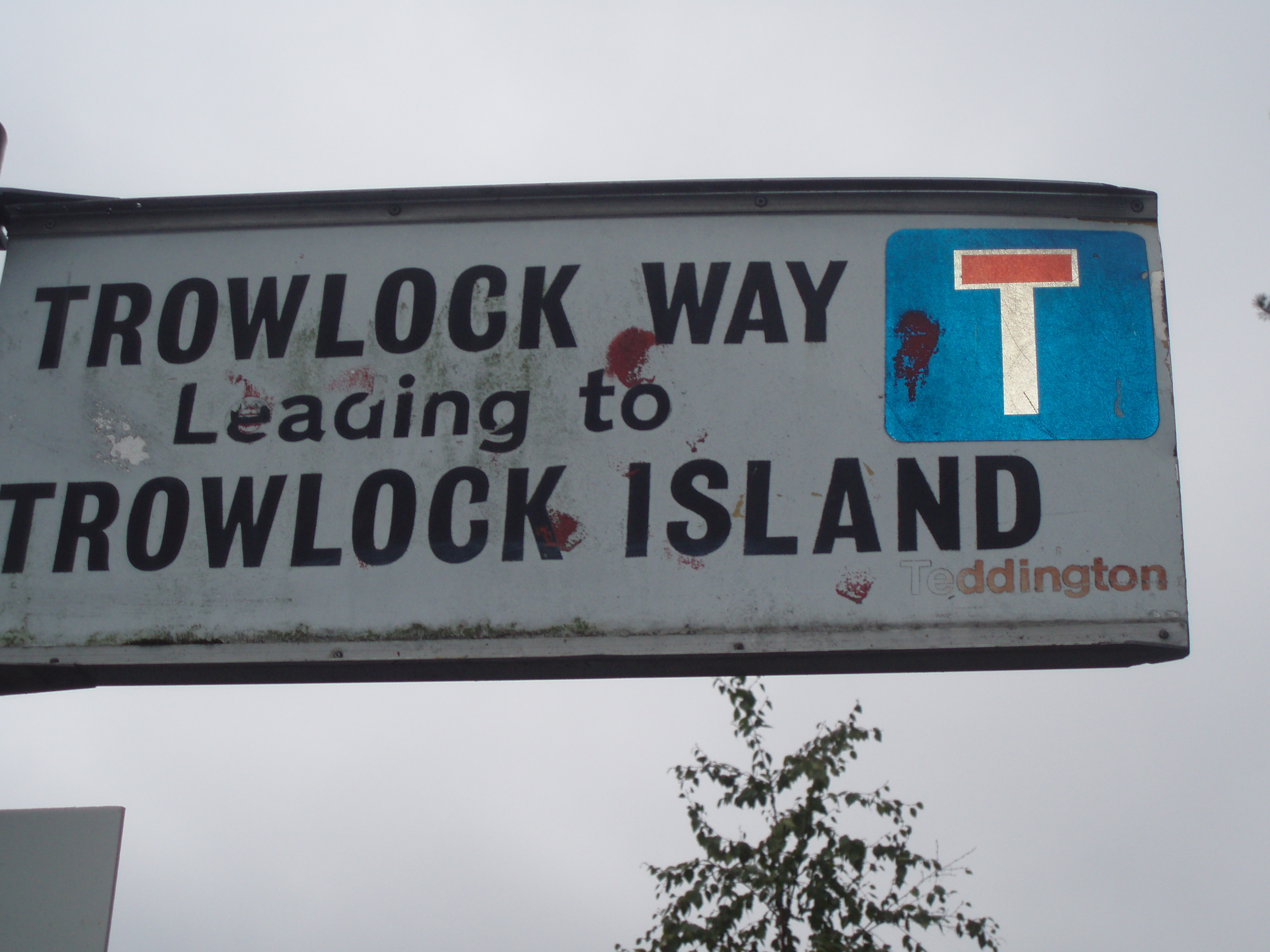

Teddington Lock's Weir is a large structure on the same side of the river by Teddington Studios and the Lensbury Club (Note: On the northern bank, traditionally e.g. in boat races referred to as the Middlesex bank such as Teddington Head Race in early November), which is 450 m (490 yd) downstream. From the Thames Path crossing across the Lock in the north Ham is accessible. From the Teddington riverside by the island, stations of Hampton Wick and Teddington are 1.4 kilometres (0.87 mi) and 1.9 kilometres (1.2 mi) respectively by foot or road and therefore the centre of Hampton Wick is closer to the island than any other settlement.

Trowlock Island contains 29 bungalows in plots as well as the Royal Canoe Club's clubhouse and gym. Trowlock Island is about one-third of a mile (0.54 kilometres) long with a path down the middle and houses on either side. Beyond the last house is a lightly wooded area with moorings on both the main river and the backwater.

== History ==
Like many islands in the Thames, the form of the island has changed over time, being shown as three separate islets on John Rocque's map of 1746. The name derives from Trow, a type of barge averaging 50–60 tons. Harry Gibbs' boat building firm was located on the island in 1910.

== Transport ==
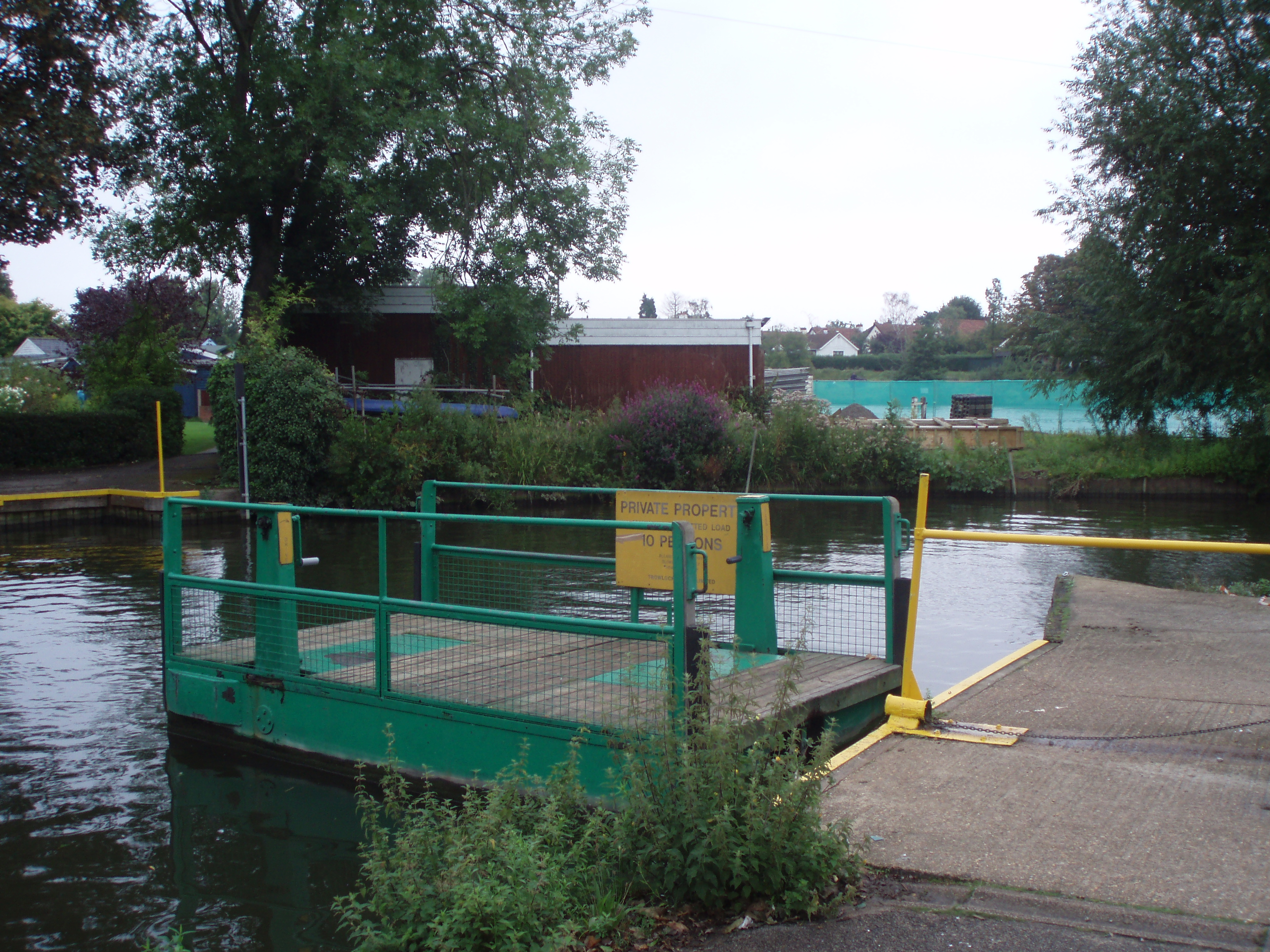
Trowlock Island chain ferry

Access is by way of a hand-wound chain ferry.

== Maintenance and facilities ==
Trowlock Island Limited manages the shared infrastructure of the island and its board of directors is elected by the shareholders — each bungalow or plot of land carries with it a number of shares so that all houseowners plus the Royal Canoe Club collectively own the company. The Canoe Club has made a recent significant investment in providing new facilities for young people, including a new gym, boatsheds and training facility. Included in this re-development is a plan for encouraging bio-diversity, such as bats (pipistrelle and Daubenton's bat being the species most likely to be found in the area), water fowl and rare species of cultivated plants.

== Wildlife ==
The island, with surrounding water and banks of reach of the Thames are home to numerous species of wildlife; the following can be seen as nesting nearby:

- Mallards
- Herons
- Great crested grebes
- Coots
- Moorhens
- Wood pigeons
- Crows
- Magpies
- Jays
- Jackdaws
- Rose-ringed parakeets
- Greenfinches
- Common chaffinches
- Sparrows
- Blue tits
- Great tits
- European robins
- Wrens
- Long-tailed tits
- Blackbirds
- Thrushes
- Great spotted woodpeckers
- Bats
- House martins
- Black-headed gulls
- Herring gulls
- Cormorants
- Swans
- Canada geese

Less frequently spotted are:

- Kingfishers
- Mandarin ducks
- Wood ducks
- Sparrowhawks
- Egyptian geese
- Black swans
- Bar-headed geese

Heard:

- Tawny owl

== Notes and references ==
Notes

== See also ==
- Islands in the River Thames

- Islands in the River Thames listed in order upstream from the sea.

| Next island upstream | River Thames | Next island downstream |
| Steven's Eyot | Trowlock Island | Swan Island |
