= British Dragon Boat Racing Association =

UK sports governing body

- Sport: Dragon Boat Racing
- Abbreviation: BDA
- Founded: 1987
- Affiliation: International Dragon Boat Federation
- President: Mike MacKeddie-Haslam
- Chairman: Neil Pickles
- Secretary: David Cogswell

Official website
- www.dragonboat.org.uk
- (United Kingdom)

The British Dragon Boat Racing Association (BDA) is the UK governing body for dragon boat racing as a sport and recreation, recognised by the UK Sports Council and a member of the Sport Alliance, Water Recreation Division.

The BDA governs the sport through its executive committee and council.

The BDA executive committee is responsible for the policy, organisation and administration of the sport, at UK level, and for the selection of British crews competing abroad.

As a national governing body, the BDA is a member of both the International Dragon Boat Federation (IDBF) and the European Dragon Boat Federation (EDBF). and is a Founding Member of both federations.

== History ==
Dragon Boat Racing first featured competitively in the UK in September 1980 at the Hong Kong in London Chinese Festival. Races held on the River Thames were won by the Richmond Canoe Club in both the Men's and Women's classes. In 1981 racing featured in the World Canoe and Kayak Racing Championships, organised by Mike MacKeddie-Haslam and held at the National Water Sports Centre, Nottingham. The Lincoln Imps crew won this 500-metre event.

The formation of the DBRC (Dragon Boat Racing Club of Great Britain) in June 1985, by Mike MacKeddie-Haslam, was the first serious attempt to organise the sport on a national scale in the British Isles. With the three Hong Kong wooden boats imported for the London Festival in 1980, the DBRC raced fairly regularly during 1986/87, and with the support of the HKTA, built the first fibre-glass dragon boat in the country.

After making its debut on the BBC TV's 'Blue Peter' programme, in May 1986 a dragon boat was raced from London to Nottingham via the canal system by a crew of soldiers in aid of charity. The crew paddled 180 miles (including 180 portages for canal locks) in 9 days and raised over £4,000 for Sport Aid en route. In 1986 and early 1987 specialist dragon boat groups were formed in Sheffield, Liverpool and Tyneside (although none of them had dragon boats, at this stage).

In July 1987, following an initiative by the DBRC, these groups came together to form the British Dragon Boat Racing Association – the BDA, which was formally constituted as the governing body for the sport of Dragon Boat Racing in the UK at an inaugural meeting held at the National Water Sports Centre, Nottingham. Mike MacKeddie-Haslam was elected as the first BDA Chairman.

The 1st National Championships were held in October 1987 on the Serpentine Lake in London's Hyde Park, where 19 crews contested the 500m races. Elmbridge Kayak Club were the first BDA National Champions over this distance. During 1988 the sport expanded rapidly when over 20 events were held in the UK and the BDA was recognised by the Central Council for Physical Recreation (CCPR) as the sport's governing body and admitted into its membership.

The sport of Dragon Boat Racing was recognised by the Sports Council in 1992 and the BDA as its Governing Body received recognition in 1994.

Lord Sebastian Coe is the current Patron of the BDA.

There are currently over 28 member teams in the BDA National League, these are split into the Standard League and the Premier League

BDA League Clubs include:

- Amathus, Queens Dock, Liverpool
- Batchworth Dragons, Rickmansworth, Hertfordshire
- Bristol Empire Dragons, Bristol
- Cambridgeshire Royals, St Neots, Cambridgeshire
- Colenorton, Eton, Berkshire
- Crusaders, Crosby, Merseyside
- Exe-Calibre, Exeter, Devon
- Henley Dragons, Henley, Berkshire
- Hurricanes, Silverwing Lake, Wraysbury, Surrey
- Kingston Royals, Kingston upon Thames, London
- Notts Anaconda, Nottingham, Nottinghamshire
- Per shore Phoenix, Pershore, Worcestershire
- Pool of Life, Liverpool, Merseyside
- Powerhouse Dragons, Middlesbrough, Teesside
- Raging Dragons, Royal Albert Docks
- Secklow Hundred, Milton Keynes, Buckinghamshire
- St Neots Dragon Boat Team, St Neots, Cambridgeshire
- Thames Dragons, Royal Albert Dock, London
- Three River Serpents, Durham, Co Durham
- Typhoon Dragon Boat Club, Royal Albert Dock, London
- Windy Pandas Dragon Boat Club, Royal Albert Docks, London
- Worcester Dragons, Bromwich Parade, Worcester, Worcestershire
- Wraysbury Dragons, Egham, Surrey

Clubs compete from the UK in the BDA National League with changing fortunes every year
