= Teddington Lock =

Series of locks on the River Thames in London

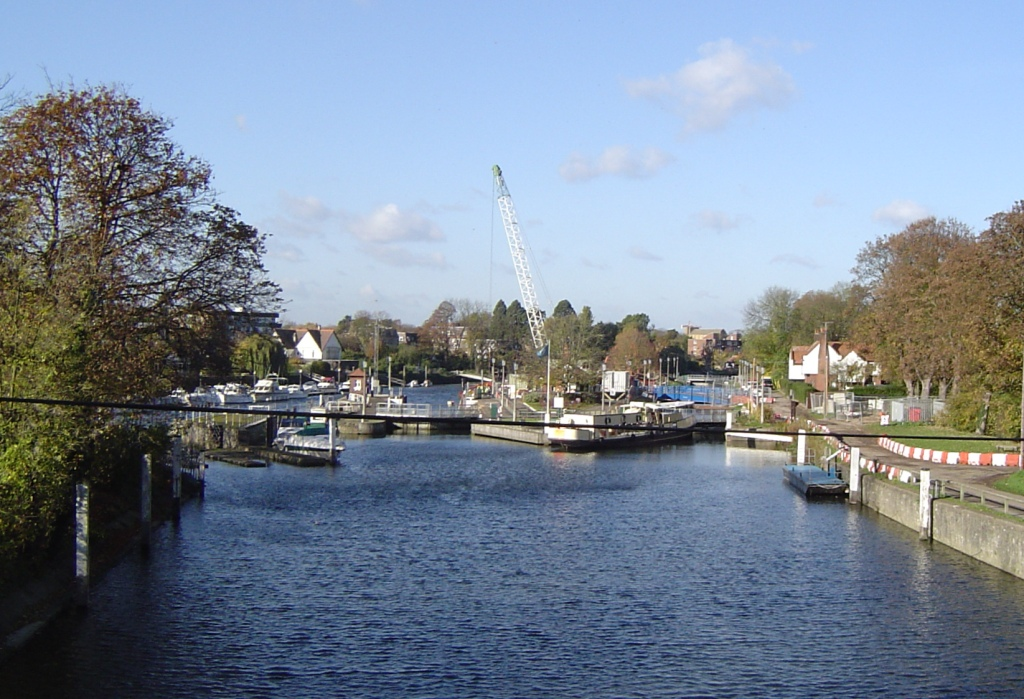
- Teddington Lock undergoing maintenance. From left to right – rollers, skiff lock, launch lock and barge lock
- Interactive map of Teddington Lock
- 51°25′54″N 0°19′26″W
- Waterway: River Thames
- Country: England
- County: Greater London
- Maintained by: Environment Agency
- Operation: Launch: Hydraulic; Skiff: Manual; Barge: Hydraulic
- First built: Launch: 1811; Skiff: 1858; Barge: 1904
- Length: Launch: 54.22 m (177 ft 11 in); Skiff: 15.08 m (49 ft 6 in); Barge: 198.12 m (650 ft 0 in)
- Width: Launch: 7.41 m (24 ft 4 in); Skiff: 1.77 m (5 ft 10 in); Barge: 7.54 m (24 ft 9 in)
- Fall: 2.68 m (8 ft 10 in)
- Above sea level: 14 ft (4.3 m)
- Teddington is normally staffed 24 hours a day

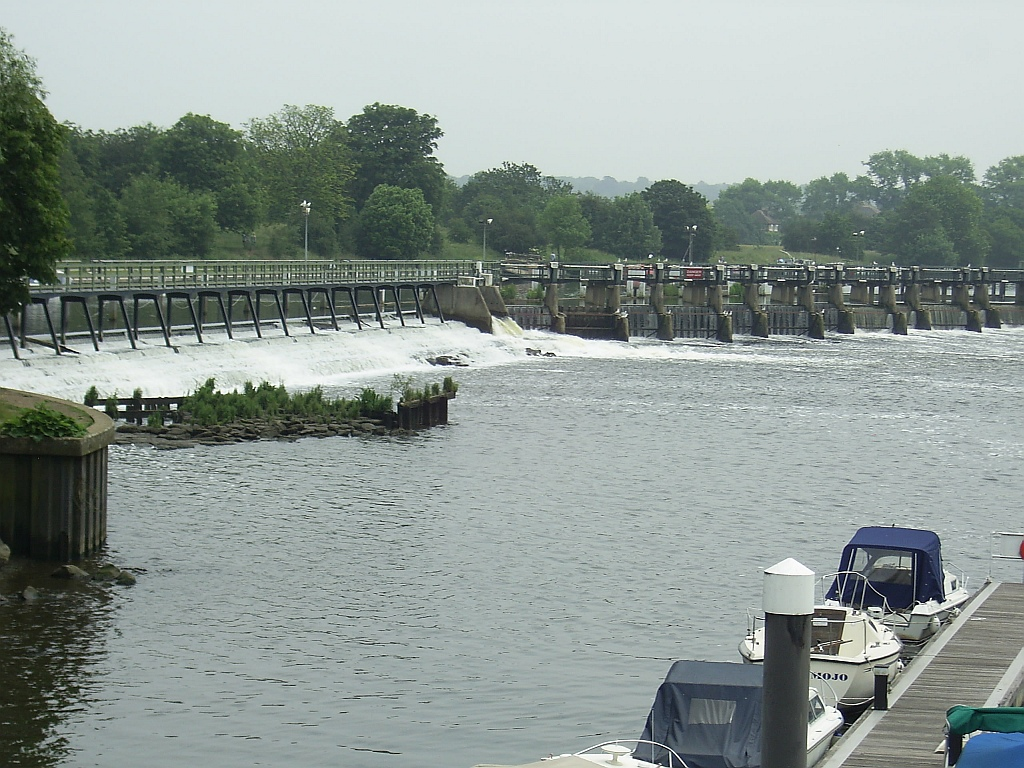
Barrage at Teddington Lock

Teddington Lock is a complex of three locks and a weir on the River Thames between Ham and Teddington in the London Borough of Richmond upon Thames, England. Historically in Middlesex, it was first built in 1810.

The limit of legal powers between the Port of London Authority, the navigation authority downstream to the North Sea and that upstream to small headwaters of the river, the Environment Agency, is marked nearby by an obelisk on the "Surrey" (towpath, right) bank. (Note: A bank of the River Thames by convention takes as its name its historic county, compass point or a general north (left) or general south (right) description) The weir named Teddington Weir marks the river's usual tidal limit and is the lowest on the Thames. This lock is the lowest full-tide lock and second lowest of all-tide locks on the Thames.

The complex of civil engineering or infrastructure in essence consists of a large long weir and three locks: a conventional launch lock in regular use, very large barge lock and a small skiff lock. The barge lock was made to accommodate long barges, steamers or passenger ferries and has an additional set of gates half-way to operate more quickly for shorter craft. The staggered structures incorporate two reinforced narrow islands. The upper island is traversed by and accessible by the lock gates or Teddington Lock Footbridge.

== Location and design ==
The greater lock is against the general south (right, towpath or Surrey) bank of the river which is for 500 m north-east here (Note: As the south bank is north-east or north, as beside the commercial district Richmond which is centred 2.2 miles (3.5 km) north, the Thames at Teddington Lock flows westward against its strongly eastward general flow; downstream of Oxfordshire other such circuitous meanders are at Wargrave, for a few metres in Windsor and at the Greenwich Peninsula); a middle lock being that most regularly used spans a long thin island which has lawns, places for boat owners to sit and a lock keeper's cabin and short thin island which is a thin wedge of concrete and a broad canoe/kayak stepped portage facility.

The river downstream of the lock is the Richmond and Twickenham reach of the Tideway, a 3.2-mile (5.1 km) reach of semi-tidal river due to the fact the Richmond Lock and half-tide barrages limits the fall of water thereby maintaining a head of water to aid navigability at and around low tide. (Note: See tidal barrage.)

Though the weir at Teddington Weir marks the managed river's usual tidal limit, after prolonged rainfall causing very high fluvial flow, specifically at high tide, a higher limit of slack water (stand of the tide) causes eddies to arise as far upstream as the top of this reach, the next lock.

The large, bow-shaped Teddington Weir is against the opposite bank. A series of two footbridges at differing heights make up a structure which crosses the locks, the middle island that has the lock keeper's cabin and the weir pool, Teddington Lock Footbridge.

== History ==
=== First lock, 1810 ===
The Navigation Act obtained in April 1771 by the Thames Navigation Commission did not allow them to build locks below Maidenhead Bridge, but from 1802, several plans for locks in the First District of the Thames, stretching from Staines to Teddington, were drawn up. Stephen Leach took over the post of Clerk of Works for the First District in 1802, following the retirement of Charles Truss at the age of 82. Just before his retirement, Truss proposed locks at Molesey and Teddington, each having a weir with long tumbling bays, similar to modern practice. John Rennie had suggested a series of long cuts in 1794, and Truss adopted the same idea. Rennie and William Jessop again proposed four long cuts in 1805, each about 1.5 miles (2.4 km), but the Navigation Committee were thwarted by strong opposition from landowners.

Zacchary Allnutt, by then Surveyor for the Second and Third Districts, stretching from Staines to Mapledurham near Reading, suggested locks at Chertsey, Sunbury and Teddington in 1805. Rennie submitted new proposals in 1809 for nine locks between Staines and Twickenham; two would be without weirs, seven would require large weirs to be built. Finally Leach drafted plans in 1810, which he suggested were "at once practicable and expedient, the least expensive, and the most likely to pass through Parliament without opposition and yet calculated to remedy the most prominent evils complained of." An Act of Parliament was obtained by the City of London Corporation in June 1810, which authorised construction of locks and weirs at Chertsey, Shepperton, Sunbury and Teddington. Each would be 150 by 20 feet (45.7 by 6.1 m) with the associated weirs having ample capacity for flood conditions. Rennie, Leach and the Navigation Committee visited the sites in July, to finalise the positioning of the lock. Leach then took charge of the work, which was undertaken by contractors Joseph Kimber and John Dows who also built Sunbury Lock.

Work at Teddington started in September 1810, but there were delays caused by flooding in November and December, and Leach awarded the contractors an extra £500. The lock was finished and opened in June 1811, but the weir was incomplete. The cofferdam protecting the works would need to be removed as river levels rose in the winter, which would have delayed completion until the following July, and so again Leach stepped in, awarding advance payments to the contractors, which enabled them to finish on time. The lock was further upstream than the present lock complex at the point where the footbridge now crosses. It comprised three pairs of gates as stipulated in the act. Total cost for lock, cut, weir, ballast and ground was £22,035 10s. 7 1/2d. (equivalent to £1,496,000 in 2025) of which the land from Lord Dysart's estate cost £282 10s. 5d.. The lock was, at first, highly unpopular with the local fishermen and bargemen. After attempts to smash it, the lock keeper was granted permission to keep "a blunderbuss with bayonet attached thereto" to ward off attacks.

=== Rebuild, 1857 ===
By 1827 the timber lock needed considerable repair and in 1829 the weir was destroyed by an accumulation of ice. It is noted that in 1843 the lock keeper prevented a steam vessel from ascending the lock. At that time steam vessels were limited to travel as far (upstream) as Richmond. As originally built, the lock had timber sides up to normal head water level, and turf above that. The crest of the weir was 3.5 feet (1.1 m) above low water level at Teddington, but following the removal of the piers of old London Bridge (demolished 1831) in 1832, the drop increased to 4.5 feet (1.4 m) and increased to 6 feet (1.8 m) when dredging of the river was carried out. At tidally lower water occasional grounding of barges took place below the bottom sill.

Consideration was given to removing the lock altogether in 1840. However, it was decided to rebuild the lock and in June 1854 proposals included providing capacity for seagoing craft with a side lock for pleasure traffic. In June 1857 the first stone of the new lock was laid at the present position, the central of the three, opened in 1858 together with the narrow skiff lock, (Note: Nicknamed among lock-keepers and lock users "the coffin"). The boat slide, separate, was added in 1869 and in the 1870s the weir collapsed twice causing enormous damage. After the weir had been rebuilt in 1871, sluice bays spanned around 240 feet (73 m), similar to the tumbling bays. (Note: The terms sluice bay and tumbling bay are two types of weir structures; the first, suspended and the second, a rising or fixed barrier.)

=== Footbridges and barge lock ===
The footbridges were opened in 1889 and finally the barge lock, the largest lock on the river, was built in 1904–1905. 7,000 cubic yards (5,400 m^{3}) of the extracted gravel was used to raise the level of Cross Deep Ait, a former ait adjacent to Swan Island downstream, to protect it from flooding. The footbridges are Grade II listed.

=== World War II ===
In 1940 Teddington Lock was the assembly point for an enormous flotilla of small ships from the length of the River Thames to be used in the evacuation of Dunkirk.

=== 21st century ===
Early twenty-first century renovation and improvement work in the area around the locks was undertaken as part of the Thames Landscape Strategy Teddington Gateway project.

In 2009, a local community group initiated a feasibility study for exploiting Teddington's weir for electricity generation, inspired by similar community-led generation schemes; Torrs Hydro and Settle Hydro. The study was encouraging and the Ham Hydro project now proposes using three reverse-Archimedean screws with a total output of 492 kilowatts (660 hp). Environmental concerns, notably those raised by anglers about the potential effect on fish populations, prompted further environmental surveys during 2012. The outcome of these considerations is awaited before the London Borough of Richmond upon Thames will determine whether planning permission is to be granted for the scheme.

== Access to and across the lock ==
The lock is on the towpath on the Surrey side in Ham about a mile below Kingston-upon-Thames. Parking is generally over 100 m distant. The nearest road is Riverside Drive in Ham. Alternatively the lock can be reached from Ferry Road Teddington over the footbridges which cross the river there.

== Reach above the lock ==
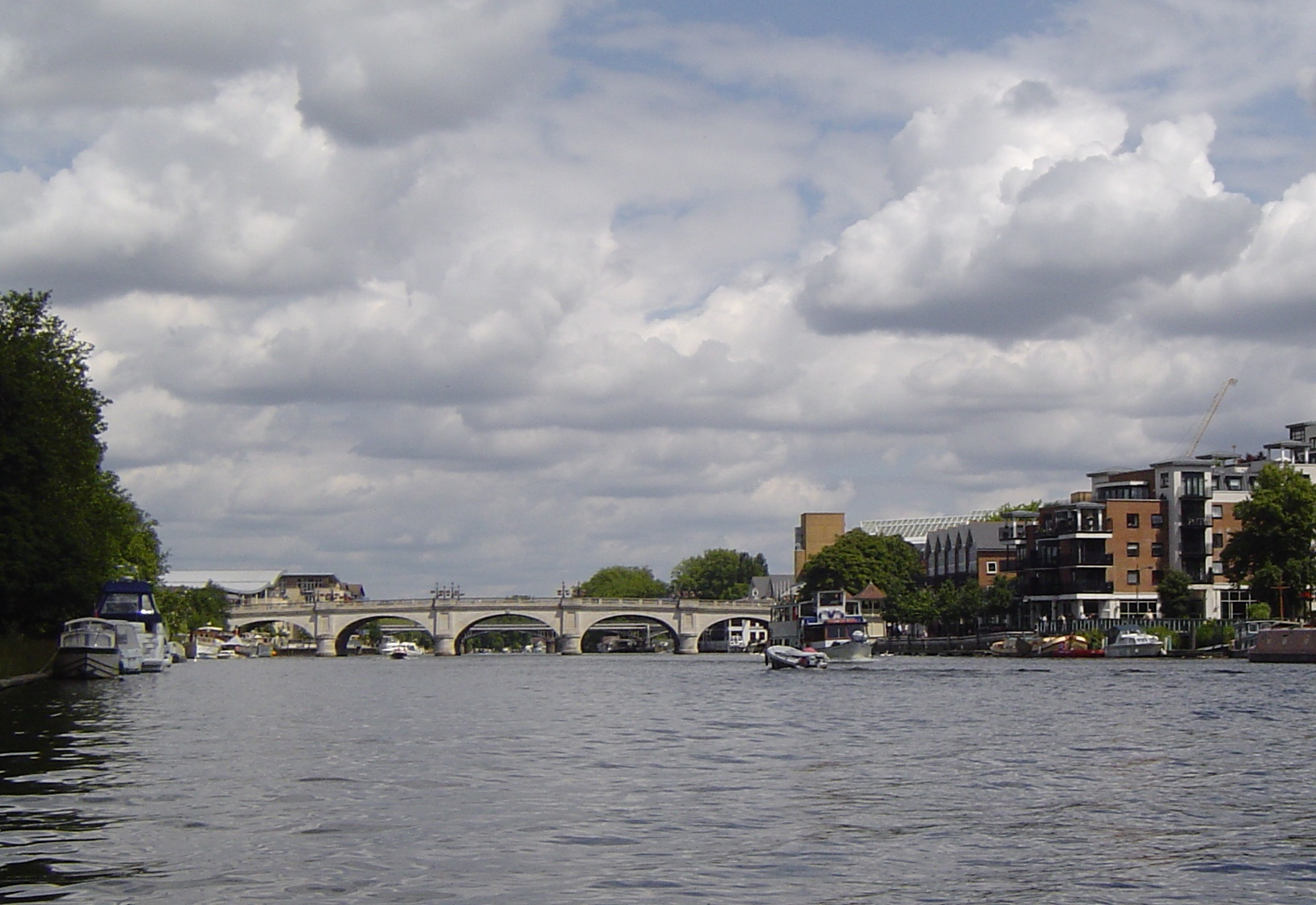
Kingston from the river

Located 0.5 miles (0.80 km) above the lock is Trowlock Island, towards the Teddington bank, followed by Steven's Eyot in the centre of the river. There are then Kingston Railway and Kingston Bridges. After 1 mile (1.6 km) the river then curves sharply to the right with Thames Ditton Island towards the village of the same name. Finally before Molesey Lock is Hampton Court Bridge.

Despite settlements on both sides of the lock having formed part of London since the 1960s, the banks are still often referred to as the "Middlesex" and "Surrey" banks.

On the Middlesex (Teddington etc.) side of the river going upstream, the bank generally consists of homes and gardens/communal grounds up to and inclusive of Hampton Wick at Kingston Bridge; Teddington Studios, Lensbury Club, watersports clubs/a football club and the nature reserve at Trowlock are on the stretch. Above Kingston Bridge is Hampton Court Park, which stretches as far as Hampton Court Bridge. Half the Longford River, which feeds the water-features of Hampton Court Palace, runs out of a grated culvert opposite Raven's Ait and below the Water Gallery. After Hampton Court Bridge (along the side of the weir stream) the bank adopts food/hotel use then residential use.

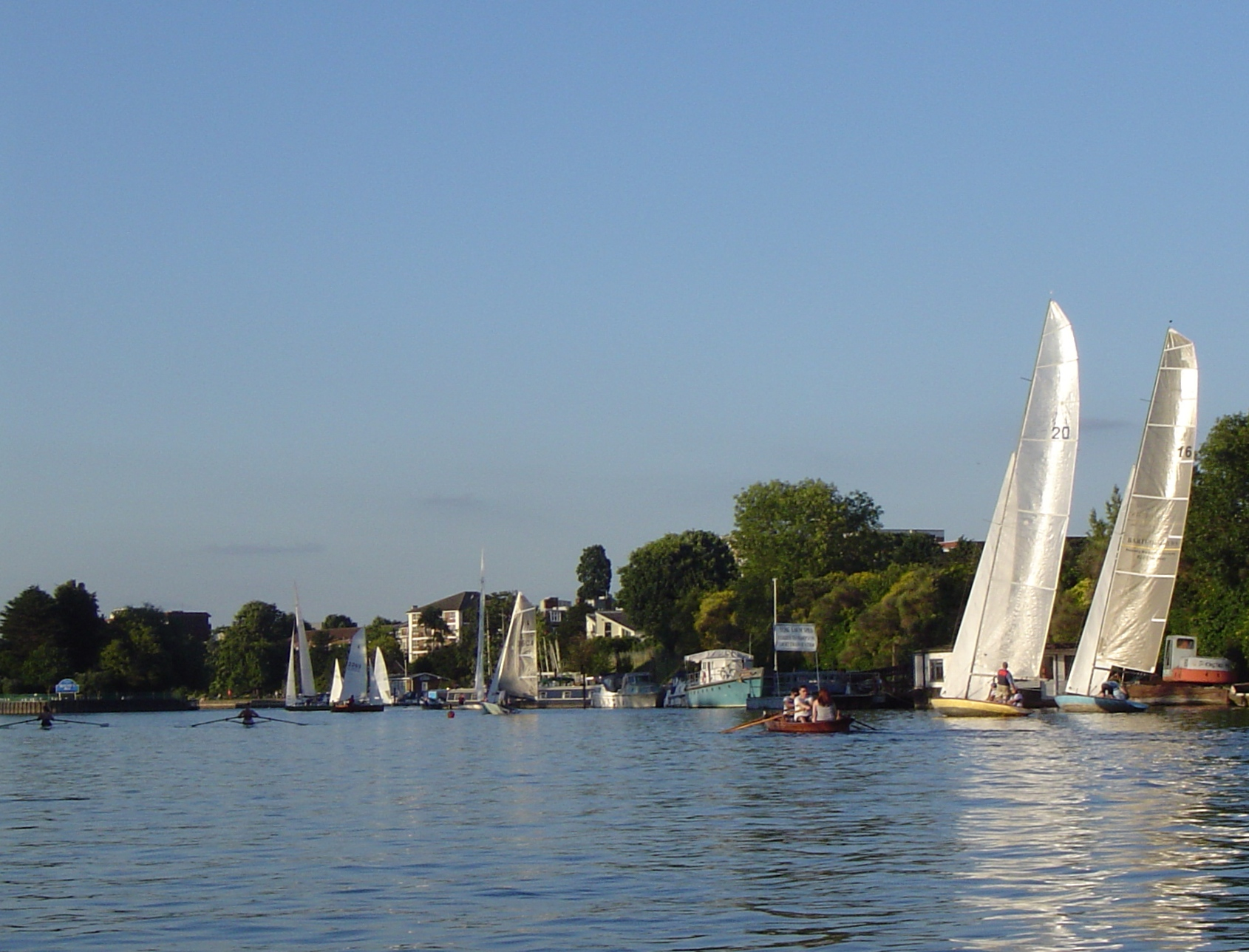
Scullers, skiffs and Thames Raters at Raven's Ait on one of the most active stretches of the river

On the Surrey side is a consistent green buffer and towpath between the river and Ham/Kingston, widening to Canbury Gardens, until the high-rise town centre is reached. The town's buildings switch to entertainment immediately south of Kingston Bridge. After the canalised mouth of the Hogsmill the riverside switches to a promenade with road by residential uses until Seething Wells reservoirs. Raven's Ait is upstream of the bridges in the centre of the river at Surbiton, followed by a marina. Long and Thames Dittons's riverside homes and pubs follow until beyond Thames Ditton Island. A riverside park and playing fields flank the mouth of the Mole until Hampton Court Bridge, near to the top of the reach, overlooking part of the Palace. Hampton Court railway station is before the bridge and just above it is Molesey Lock.

=== Boats ===
There are navigation transit markers between Kingston Bridge and Raven's Ait on the Hampton Court bank, to allow river users to check their speed. A powered boat may not pass except in emergencies between the markers in less than one minute. The reach is home to at least five sailing clubs, five rowing clubs, two skiffing and punting clubs, the Royal Canoe Club and two Sea Cadet centres. Numerous pleasure boats ply for trade, London Riverboat services and chartered trips between Kingston and Hampton Court.

=== Thames Path ===
The Thames Path as its towpath follows the Surrey side to Kingston Bridge where it crosses to run alongside Hampton Court Park, before returning to what is traditionally (and in navigation use) termed the "Surrey side" at Hampton Court Bridge.

=== Sinuosity ===
The river makes an acute inside angle on this reach — Teddington and Molesey locks are less than half the distance apart by land.

=== Sports clubs on the reach ===
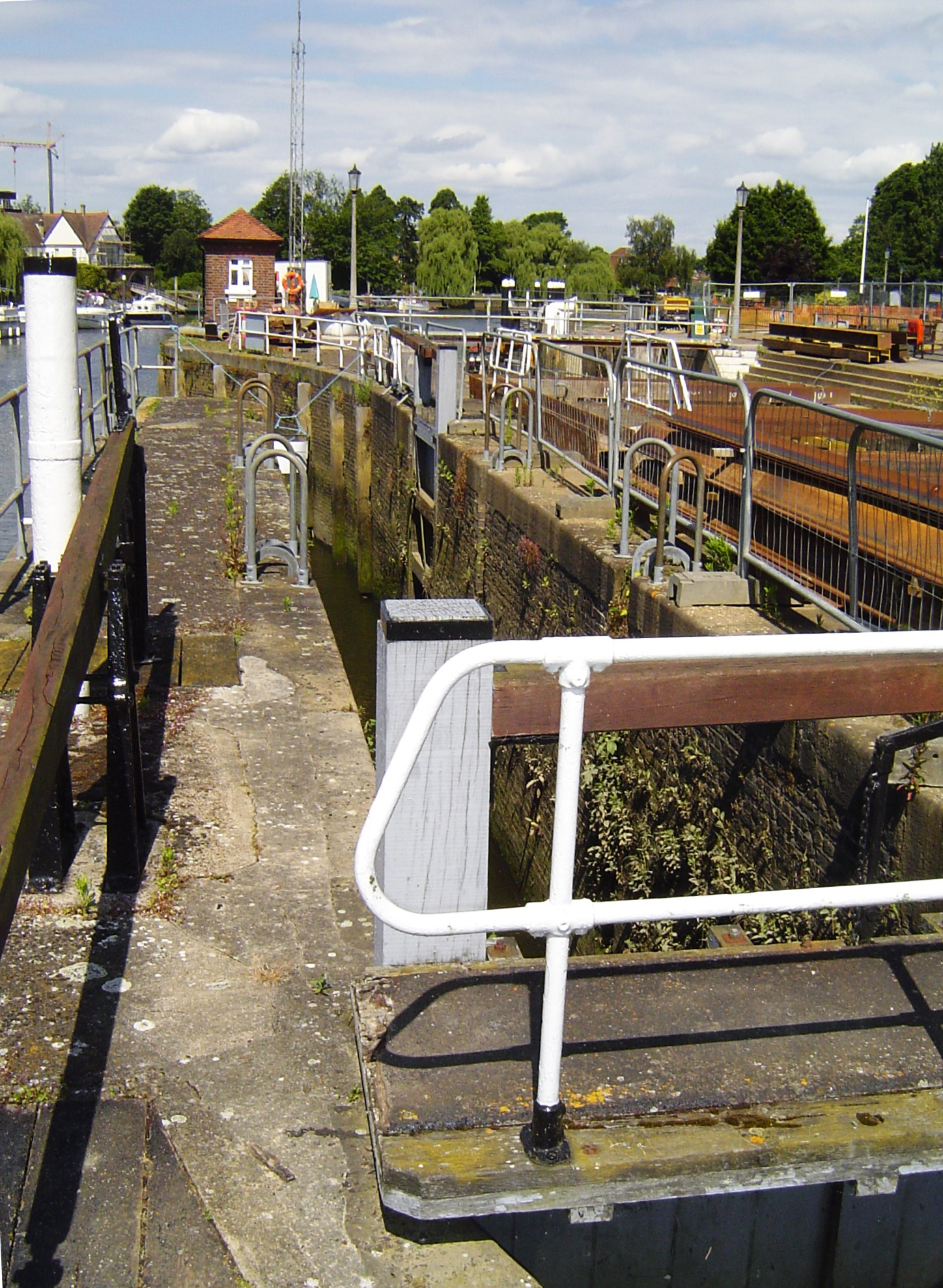
The skiff lock at Teddington

- Royal Canoe Club
- Kingston Rowing Club
- Walbrook Rowing Club
- Tiffin School Boat Club
- Kingston Grammar School Boat Club
- Kingston University Boat Club
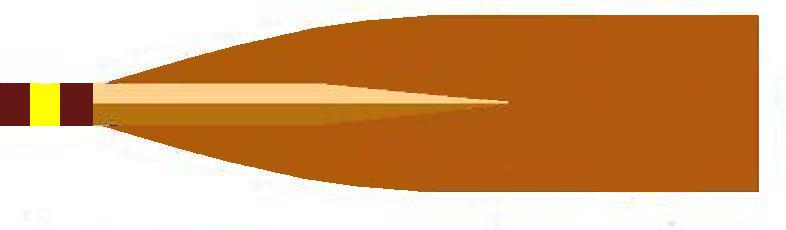
- The Skiff Club
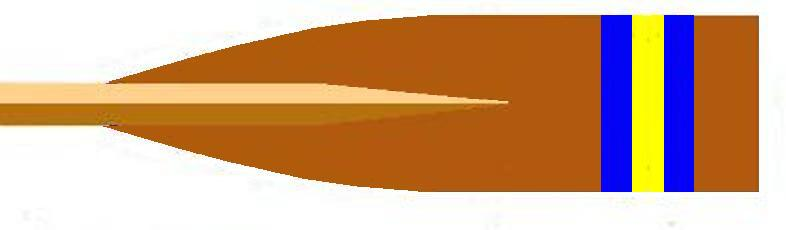
- Dittons Skiff and Punting Club
- Thames Sailing Club
- Tamesis Club
- Minima Yacht Club
- Kingston Royals Dragon Boat Racing Club
- 1st Surbiton (Sealion) Sea Scouts
- Ajax Sea Scouts
- Leander Sea Scouts

== Popular culture and the media ==
The lock was the location of the Fish-Slapping Dance sketch in Monty Python's Flying Circus.

Thames Television had its purpose-built Teddington Studios at Teddington Lock.

In a third-season episode of Murder Maps, Teddington Lock was the location of the brutal murder of two teenage girls in the summer of 1953. The murderer, Alfred Whiteway, was apprehended, found guilty and was executed in December 1953.

== See also ==
- Locks on the River Thames
- Rowing on the River Thames
- Sailing on the River Thames

== Bibliography ==
- Skempton, Alec (1996). Civil Engineers and Engineering in Britain, 1600–1830. Variorum. ISBN 978-0-86078-578-1.

Next lock upstream	River Thames	Next lock downstream
Molesey Lock; 7.74 km (4.81 mi)	Teddington Lock; Grid reference: TQ165716	Richmond Lock
