= Royal Canoe Club =

Water sports club in London, England

The Royal Canoe Club (RCC), founded in 1866, is the oldest canoe club in the world and received royal patronage in the 19th century. The club promotes canoeing and kayaking, focusing on flatwater, sprint and marathon disciplines. Members of the club have represented Great Britain at World Championships and the Olympic Games. The club is based at Trowlock Island on the River Thames in Teddington near London. The premises are also used by Walbrook Rowing Club, The Skiff Club and Kingston Royals Dragon Boat Racing Club.

== History ==
John MacGregor, a Scottish lawyer, popularised canoeing in the late 19th century. He went on extensive tours on the rivers and canals of Central and Northern Europe and the Mid-east in a boat he designed named the 'Rob Roy'. Through a series of books and lectures he formed a group of sportsmen who met in 1866 to form the Canoe Club. The first recorded regatta was held on 27 April 1867. This is now known as The Paddling Challenge, and runs every year as the oldest canoe race in the world. In the same year, Edward VII, Prince of Wales, later to become King Edward VII, became Commodore of the Club and in 1873 the Canoe Club became the Royal Canoe Club by command of Queen Victoria. Evidence to support this exists in club records in the form of correspondence with Whitehall.

== Races at Royal Canoe Club ==
=== The Paddling Challenge ===
The Paddling Challenge is the world's oldest canoe race. It continues to run every year. People come from all over the country to compete. Sometimes people from other countries have come to compete. We see 10 km and 5 km courses being run for senior men, senior women, junior men, junior women and outriggers. Prizes for top three of each and trophies. There is an additional trophy for the fastest junior from Royal Canoe Club.

=== Royal Hasler ===
As part of British Canoeing's Hasler Series, Royal host a race yearly as part of the London Region. Clubs from in and out of the region come to race the Thames in many different divisions. It is always held at the start of summer and the club sees all ages come in for a day with friends.

=== Royal Sprint Regatta ===
The Royal Sprint Regatta is held annually at a smaller scale than the other races. It is a chance for people to race at a regional level. Typically the club welcomes mainly juniors from nearby clubs but also sees adults racing. Distances can include 200m, 500m and 2 km.

== Junior life at the club ==
Royal Canoe Club has a junior section for children ages 8 and up, offering coaching from beginner to advanced levels, with a focus on getting them paddling and enjoying the sport.

Recently, the club appointed Beata Fabinska as Head Coach to lead a structured junior program with groups named after famous kayakers to inspire athletes, including Ábrahám, Brabants, Carrington, and Dietze.

Juniors at the club compete at regional, national, and international level events, with medals earned across all levels.

== International competitors and other members ==
RCC is the home club of the 2008 Olympic champion in the men's K1 1000 m kayak class, Dr. Tim Brabants, who won his gold medal in Beijing on 22 August 2008, and followed this up with the bronze medal in the K1 500m the following day. Along with Brabants, the club membership includes several world championship medallists (among them Alan Williams, Grayson Bourne, Chris Canham, Steve Jackson, Jeremy West) and Ian Wynne who won a bronze medal at the Olympic Games in Athens 2004. The club provides support and coaching for all levels from beginner to advanced. The club also sees juniors excel in international competitions, with many medals being won.

Club members represented Great Britain at the Berlin Olympics in 1936 when canoeing was introduced as an Olympic sport and at every Olympic Games since. In 1922, Edward, Prince of Wales (later to become the Duke of Windsor), became Commodore, a position he held until he acceded the throne.

Club member Jessica Walker continues to represent both her club and her country. She attended the Beijing Olympics, the London Olympics, and the Rio Olympics, making three finals in total.

A notable member of the club was Warington Baden-Powell, brother of Lord Baden Powell. Uffa Fox was not a member, but was nevertheless closely associated with members of the club including Roger de Quincey for whom he designed "Wake".
