= Canbury Gardens =

Park in Kingston upon Thames, London

Coordinates: 51.418°N 0.305°W

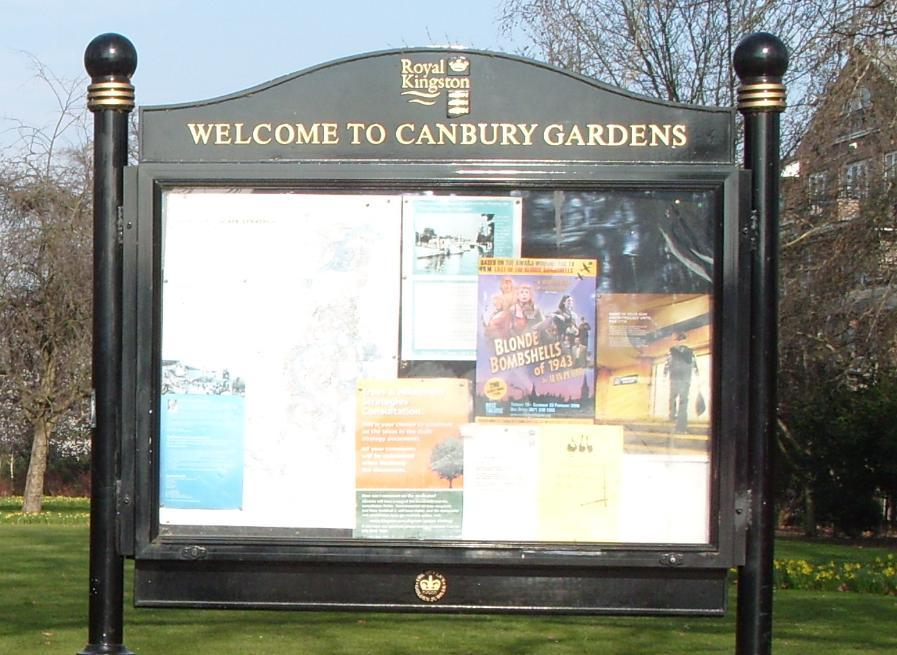
Entrance sign

Canbury Gardens is a public space in the Canbury district of Kingston upon Thames, along the Lower Ham Road, covering 14½ acres area between the road and the towpath along the River Thames, downstream from Kingston Railway Bridge.

== History ==
In feudal times parishioners used the area to graze animals and cut turf and timber for fuel. In the 19th century when material for road building became a valuable resource, the old grazing land was replaced by a series of pits for gravel extraction. By 1887 the site had become an eyesore and the borough proposed a public garden "that the view from the river shall be a pleasant one and not, as at present, unsightly and obnoxious". The gardens were designed by the borough surveyor Henry Macaulay and opened in 1890. In 1891 Charles Nuthall a former Mayor of Kingston, who owned a confectionery shop in Thames Street, paid for a bandstand to be erected. He also hoped it would be 'suitable for a summer house or shelter'

Kingston Power Station was built on the ground behind which had formerly been used to convert raw sewage to garden fertiliser. Landscaping work in the 1980s restored the gardens and, after the demolition of the power stations, flats were built on its site.

== Poplars ==
On 25 March 1998 poplars separating the park from the Fairclough Homes site were felled, a cause which had resulted in protests up the trees, an eco-warrior camp, and a 17,000-person petition. The Surrey Comet reported on 27 March 1998 that: "The first of the Canbury Gardens poplars came crashing down on Wednesday evening after a massive eviction operation costing up to £500,000 and involving 300 police, bailiffs, privacy security men, helicopters and boats."

== Today ==
The park consists of open lawns and a band stand. Several hard surface tennis courts are available to the public. The toilet block, closed in 1984, has been converted into the 'Canbury Secret Café'. The Gardens have been included in the UK Government's Playbuilder Project, a national project funded by the Department for Children, Schools and Families (DCSF) for developing play areas. Also within the site are Kingston Rowing Club and the "Boater's Inn", a local jazz venue. Until 2009, the gardens hosted the yearly Green Fair event where band concerts were held and fundraising for local charities. This event has since been cancelled. The gardens also host a Dragon Boat race.

On the bank of the Thames, next to the Rowing Club, is a memorial (erected 2020) for Rosie Mitchell, aged 15, who collapsed and died from a suspected cardiac arrhythmia while rowing in 2016.

Buses that run close to Canbury Gardens include the 65. The Thames Path from Teddington Lock passes along the river frontage which faces Steven's Eyot.

== Gallery ==
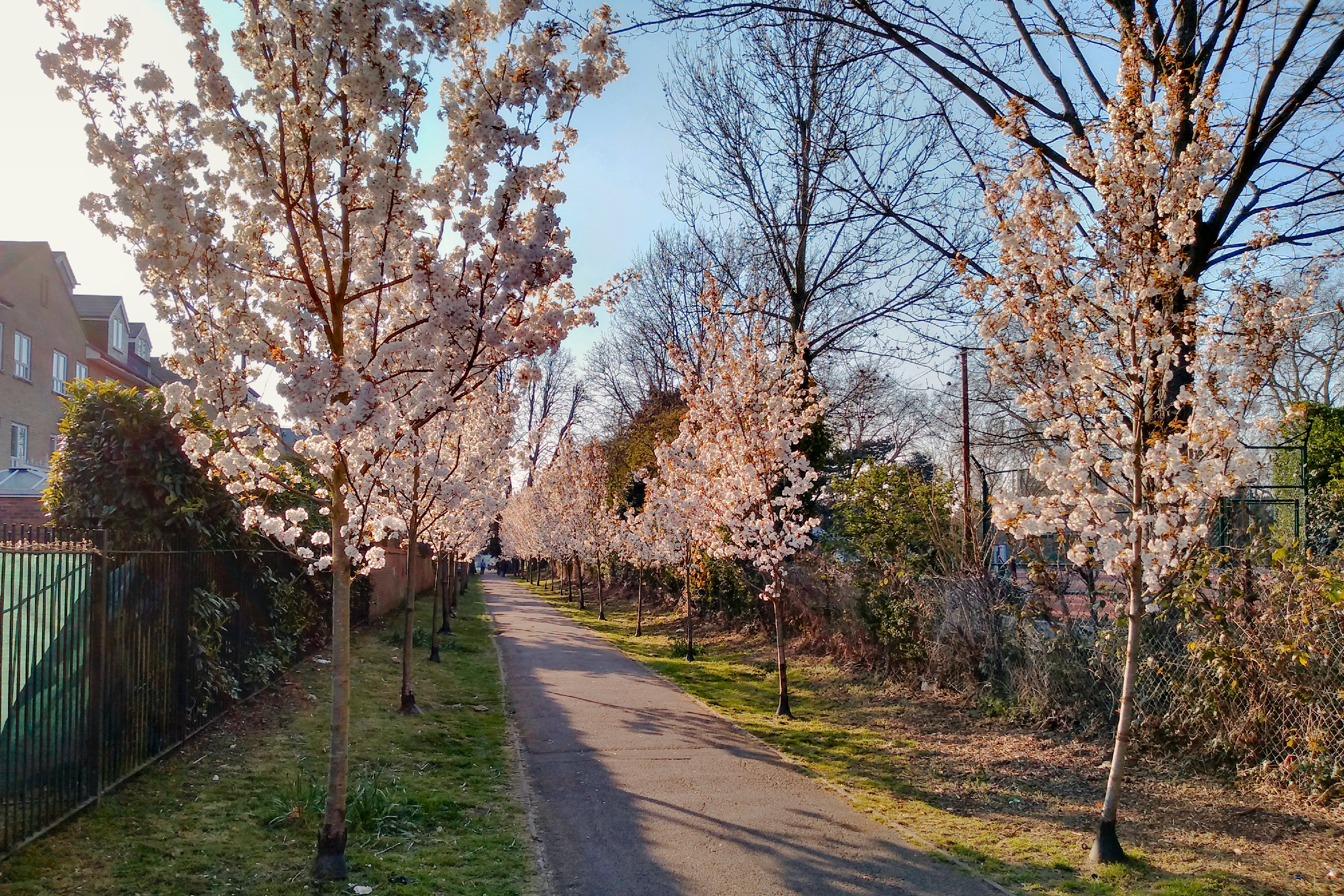
Cherry Tree Avenue

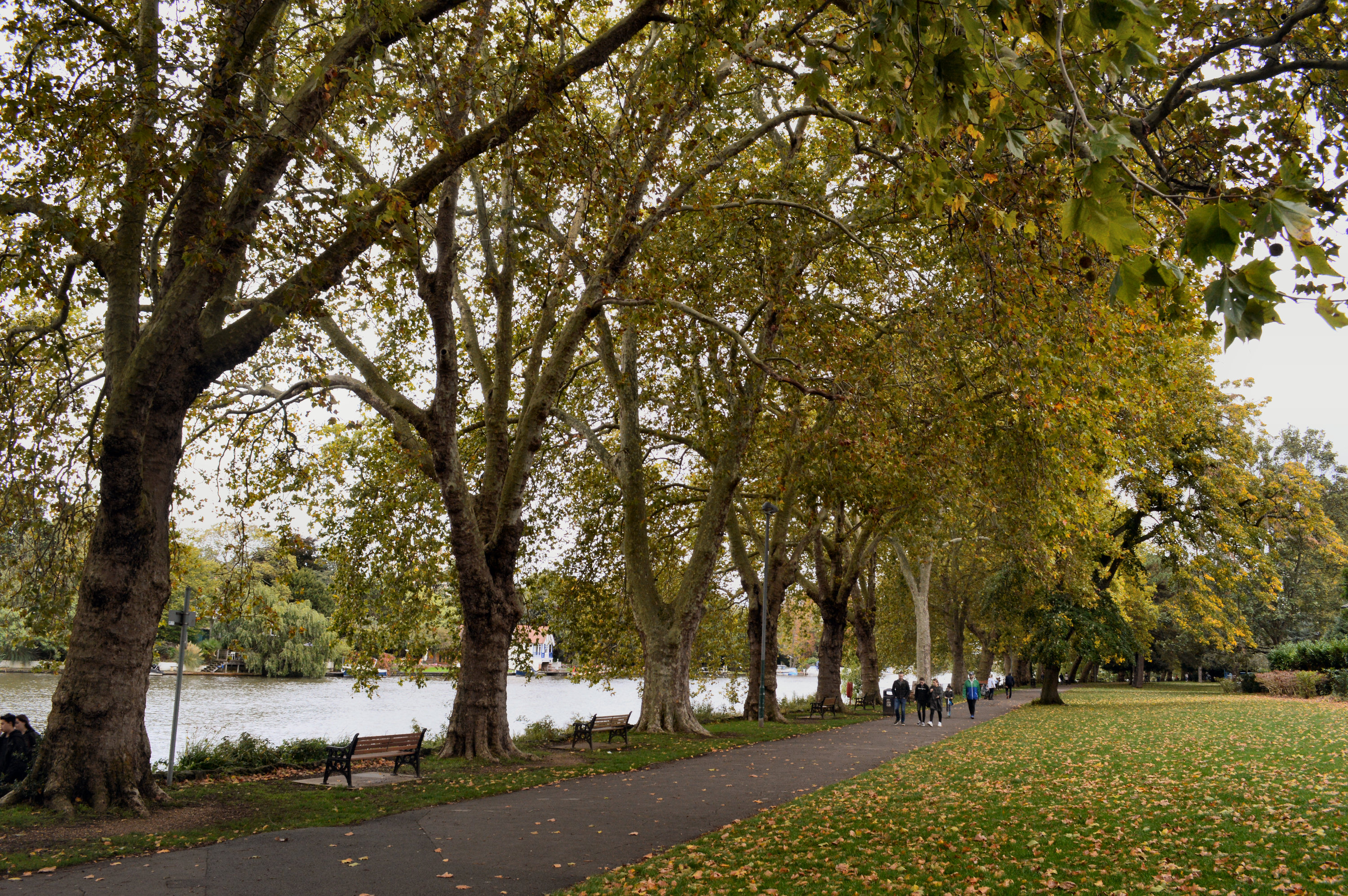
Thames path

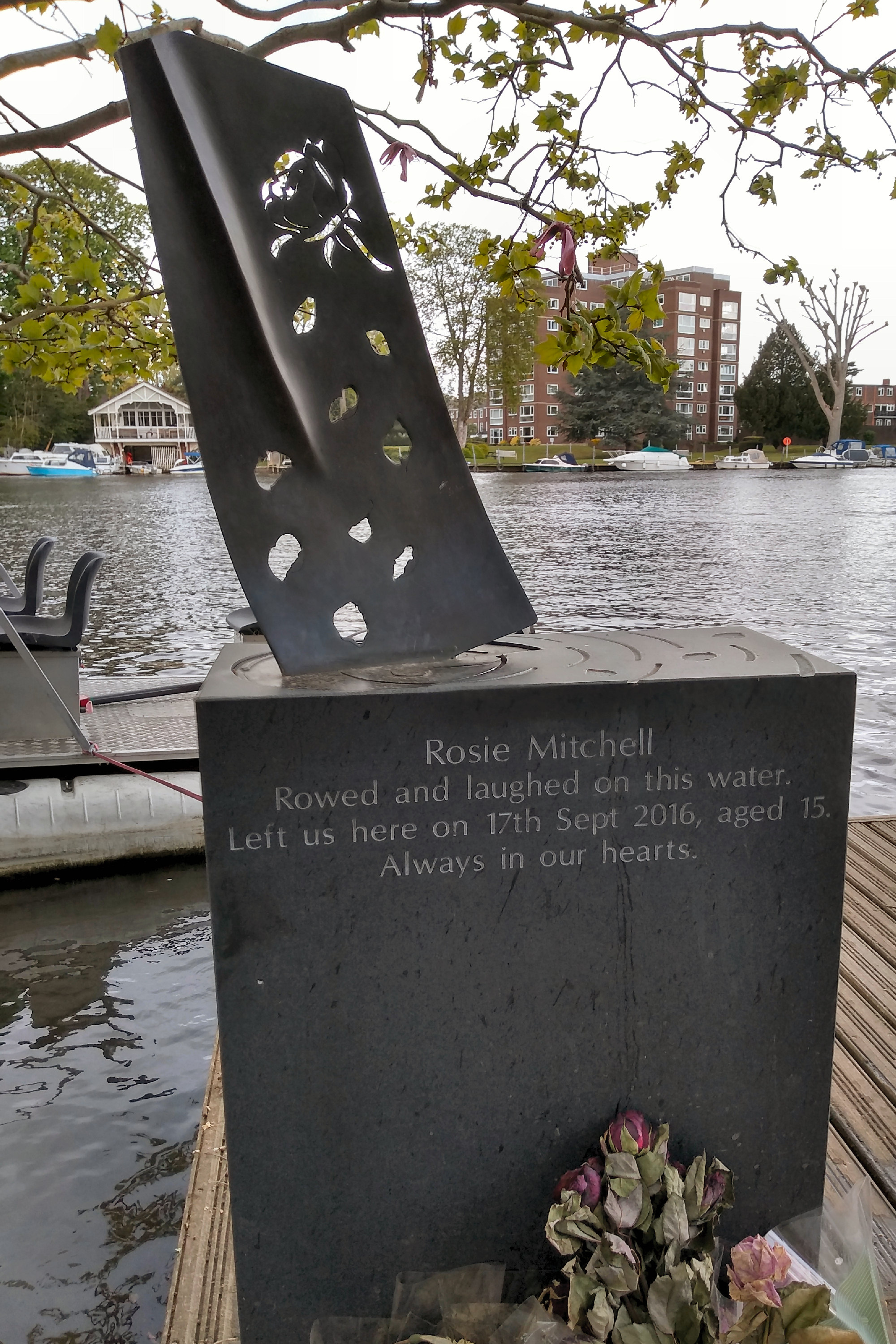
Rosie Mitchell memorial

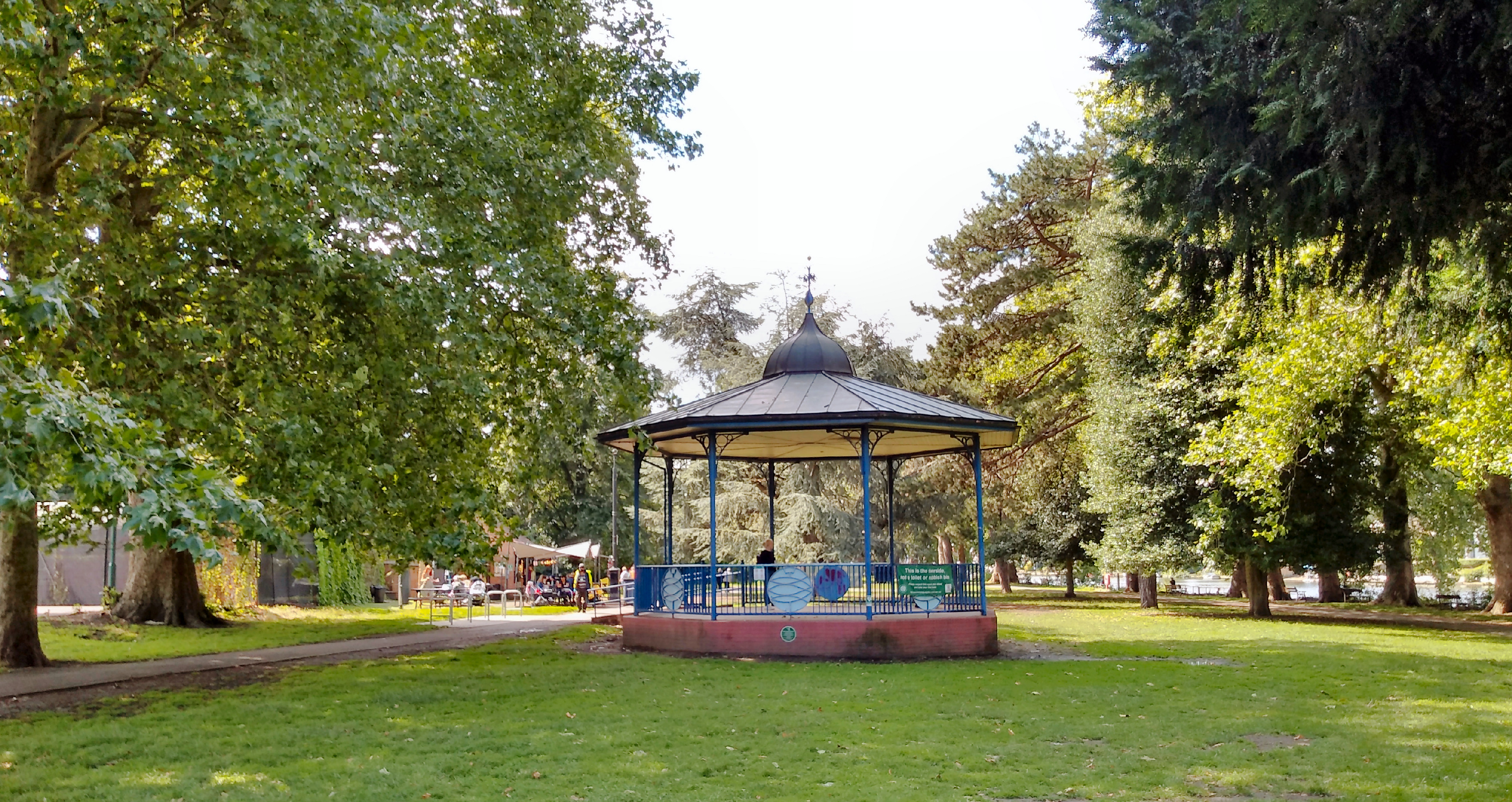
Bandstand
