= Jacky Jhaj =

British sex offender (born 1985)

Jaskarn "Jacky" Jhaj
- Born: 1985 (age 40–41)
- Years active: 2016–2025
- Status: Registered sex offender
- Criminal charges: Sexual activity with minors (2016); fraud; identity theft; money laundering; breach of SHPO
- Penalty: 4 years

Jaskarn "Jacky" Jhaj (born 1985) is a British convicted sex offender who has conducted a number of public stunts, mostly involving children, which have received high-profile media coverage due to their bizarre nature.

In June 2025, Jhaj was the subject of controversy when he was arrested at the Disneyland Paris resort during a mock "wedding" to a 9-year-old girl.

== Biography ==
=== 2016 conviction and subsequent incidents ===
He was convicted in 2016 of four counts of sexual activity with two 15-year-old girls having pretended to be a film producer. Jhaj had driven near schools in Hounslow in west London claiming to be a Hollywood film producer and offering alcohol. He was sentenced to four years in prison. He is on the sex offenders register.

In 2023 Jhaj staged a mock film premiere in Leicester Square involving girls who were hired to pose as fans. The children had been instructed to "cry, far-reach and faint" for Jhaj by the casting agency that had hired them.

In March 2024, Jhaj paid £10,000 to child actors to stage a mock funeral at London Oratory for a missing Latvian man, posing as his brother and using a fake Russian death certificate.

Jhaj was arrested in June 2024 after being witnessed talking to young girls in east London outside a dance school. He also filmed them and took photos without the consent of their parents.

=== 2024 Silvertown fire ===
On 31 August 2024 in what Jhaj described as 'Project Dover' he started a large fire in an explosion "using gunpowder and a detonation cord" in a yard on Dock Road in Silvertown, Greenwich. A fake BBC News lorry and police cars were set on fire and destroyed while Jhaj posed naked for cameras. He had initially worn prosthetics to disguise his identity. The Evening Standard reported that Jhaj had " ... sat at a typewriter surrounded by hundreds of newspapers on the floor before flicking cigarettes at a police car, a police van and a BBC World News branded lorry which all exploded into a huge blaze". 25 firefighters were involved in suppressing the fire. No one was injured in the incident.

=== 2025 Disneyland mock wedding ===
In June 2025 he held a mock wedding ceremony with a nine-year-old Ukrainian girl at Disneyland Paris. Authorities estimated the cost at €130,000. Prosthetics were again used to disguise his identity. The ceremony involved 100 extras who were paid €200 after responding to an advertisement posted online that described a "prestige wedding rehearsal" which required "absolute confidentiality". A 55-year-old Latvian man was paid €12,000 to pretend to be the father of the bride but told the park security who informed the police after discovering that the bride was a child. The girl had arrived in France with her mother two days before the incident. Both the girl and her mother are Ukrainian citizens. Park staff called police, concerned that a child marriage was being conducted.

He was subsequently held by French authorities and charged with fraud, identity theft and money laundering. The Parisian prosecutors said that the girl involved had not been "a victim of either physical or sexual violence and had not been forced to play the role of a bride" and that a stolen Latvian form of identification had been used by the organiser. The management of Disneyland said that the event was "immediately cancelled by our teams after major irregularities were identified" and that they were " ... cooperating fully with the authorities in their investigation, and have filed a complaint with the relevant authorities". In October 2025, he was remanded in Meaux-Chauconin jail for a further four months. His lawyer said at the hearing that he had been harassed in jail and said the wedding was a film shoot.
