= London Oratory School =

Catholic School in London, England

The London Oratory School

Location
- Seagrave Road; Fulham, Greater London, SW6 1RX; United Kingdom; 51.4823°N 0.1938°W

Information
- Type: Voluntary Aided
- Motto: Respice Finem ("Look to the end")
- Religious affiliations: Roman Catholic (Oratorian)
- Established: 1863; 163 years ago
- Founders: Members of the London Oratory
- Department for Education URN: 137157 Tables
- Provost of The London Oratory: The Very Revd Julian Large
- Headmaster: Daniel Wright
- Staff: 206
- Teaching staff: 129
- Gender: Boys (Coeducational Sixth Form)
- Age: 7 (Junior House) to 18
- Enrolment: 1,350~
- Student to teacher ratio: 11:1
- Houses: 6 (excluding the Junior House)
- Colours: Red and black
- Song: "Quam Bonum Est"
- Publications: The Oratorian, The Review
- Former pupils: Old London Oratorians (informally Old Oratorians)
- Website: www.london-oratory.org

The London Oratory School, also informally called the Oratory, is a Catholic voluntary aided secondary school for boys aged 7–18 and girls aged 16–18 in West Brompton. Founded in 1863 by The Fathers of The London Oratory then in Chelsea, London, it is historically linked to two fellow Oratorian institutions: the nearby Brompton Oratory and The Oratory School in Oxfordshire. The school is known for the quality of its choral and instrumental music and is one of England's oldest Catholic schools. The London Oratory School was named in The Sunday Times as one of the 'Top 10 Comprehensive Schools in the UK' for both 2022 and 2023.

The London Oratory School admits 180 boys to the first form, as well as twenty boys who join the senior school from the Junior House. The School educates boys aged 7–16 and boys and girls aged 16–18 in the sixth form. There are around 1,350 pupils including about 350 in the sixth form. The School shares its religious and cultural identity with the Congregation of the Oratory who founded the School and are its trustees. The school's formal links with the Brompton Oratory go back to the foundation of the school by The Congregation of the Oratory of Saint Philip Neri (London) and continue as the Fathers of this Congregation are the trustees of the School. The London Oratory School and The Brompton Oratory continue their close working relationship which includes the Oratory Fathers supplying chaplaincy to the School and the School supplying the Schola choir for the parish.

== History ==
The Fathers of the London Oratory in Brompton, near South Kensington, opened their first school in King William Street in the City of London in 1852 and two parochial schools in Chelsea in 1856. Seven years later, in 1863, at the request of Cardinal Wiseman, who wanted to provide a wider education for Catholic children than was available at that time, the Oratory Fathers established a school for boys in Chelsea, and in 1870 a school for girls staffed by the Daughters of the Cross. These schools were fee paying and they were the forerunners of the present school.

Both schools flourished but in the early part of the last century Cardinal Vaughan asked the Oratory Fathers to inaugurate the first Central Schools for Catholic children. This they did in 1912, developing the two schools which ceased to be fee paying, into Central Schools on a site in Stewart's Grove, Chelsea.

During both World Wars, sixty six 'Old Oratorians' lost their lives fighting for their country, with some of the men having been members of the Oratory Cadet Corps. The vast majority of Oratory boys joined the Army or RAF, but a select few did join the Royal Navy. Old Oratorians were recipients of decorations, such as the Croix de Guerre, the Distinguished Conduct Medal and the Military Cross. On the outbreak of war in 1939, the school, together with Fr Dale-Roberts of the Oratory, moved to Tonypandy in South Wales, whilst the school site in Stewart Grove was taken over by the War Office and used as a high status internment camp.

In 1959 the two central schools were amalgamated and in 1962 it was decided that the Daughters of the Cross were to be withdrawn after almost a century of devoted work. In 1963 the school was classed as a four-form entry grammar school admitting only boys since there were already many more selective places for girls than boys in the schools in the Westminster diocese. However, those girls currently at the school were, on the insistence of the newly appointed headmaster – who had applied for and been appointed head of a mixed school – allowed to remain at the school to complete their education.

The school moved to its present site in Fulham in 1970, now with six forms of entry (180) at 11+, with girls being admitted annually to the sixth form.

In September 1989 the school, formerly a voluntary-aided school, became a grant-maintained school, continuing in the trusteeship of the Fathers of the London Oratory, who own the building and grounds and appoint the majority of the governors.

The Junior House, occupying a newly built block adjacent to the Arts Centre, was opened in September 1996, to which 20 seven-year-old boys are admitted for a specialist music education, with a strong emphasis on Catholic liturgical music.

Under the Academies Act 2010, the school became an Independent Academy in August 2011.

The school marked its 150th anniversary on 27 September 2013 with the celebration of Mass in Westminster Cathedral.

On 27 December 2023 at around 10 am, a blaze erupted in one of the school buildings. Emergency services were quickly on the scene and the fire was brought under control, with no casualties reported. The fire caused extensive damage, destroying the school's library and science block rendering them unusable. A sixteen-year-old youth was arrested and taken into custody on suspicion of arson.

=== Headmasters ===
- Dr. John Menzies Duffy (1890–1930)
- Lawrence J. B. Summerbell (1930–1957)
- Mr J. P. O'Friel (1958–1960)
- Mr M. J. Campbell (1960-1962)
- Ian G. Gaffney (1963–1977)
- John McIntosh, CBE. (1977–2007)
- David McFadden (2007–2017)
- Pauline Devereux and Daniel Rooney (2017–2018) (job share)
- Daniel Wright (2018–present)

== Houses ==
The school's houses are named after notable Catholic Tyburn Martyrs.

House	Colour	Patron Saint
Campion		St. Edmund Campion
Fisher		St. John Fisher
Howard		St. Philip Howard
More		St. Thomas More
Owen		St. Nicholas Owen
Southwell		St. Robert Southwell
Junior House		St. Edward the Confessor

== Junior House ==
Twenty seven-year-old boys are admitted to the Junior House for a specialist musical education, including instrumental tuition. Some of the boys are admitted as choristers and sing in the London Oratory School Schola at from age 7. Boys admitted to the Junior House are full members of the school and are expected to continue their education at the school for the remainder of their Secondary Education. This is up until the age of sixteen.

Pupils are selected on the basis of their musical aptitude and are required to take part in musical and, in the case of choristers, choral activities arranged outside normal school hours, including weekends and holidays, and to learn at least the piano and an instrument of choice.

== London Oratory School Schola ==
London Oratory School Schola in performance

The Oratory in London is part of a liturgical and musical tradition which goes back to the 16th century when the first Oratory was established in Rome at the time of the Counter-Reformation. Both Palestrina and Victoria – the latter joining the Congregation – were closely associated with the Oratory and St Philip Neri, its founder. The Oratory in Europe has been closely associated with the development of polyphony and the chant. The Oratory in London together with the school have gained a reputation for maintaining the rich tradition of liturgical music in England and Europe.

Choristers normally join the school at the age of seven and are selected by audition, examination and interview, although places may sometimes be available to boys who join the school at a later stage. The Choristers rehearse before lessons every morning, as well as for an hour immediately before services, and frequently during the lunch break and after school. They receive voice training from one of London's vocal coaches and all boys are given individual voice lessons. When their voices change, they devote more time to instrumental music. Their interest in singing is kept alive until their voices have developed sufficiently to enable them, where appropriate, to return to the Schola as Choral Scholars, when they benefit from the opportunity of singing alongside professional lay clerks from the Oratory Church Choir. Choristers are involved in other aspects of the musical life of the school.

The Schola sings at the Saturday evening Mass at the Oratory every week in term time and at other Masses and services during and outside term, and in the School Chapel during the week. In addition to the liturgical commitment, the choir engages in concert work and touring and has recorded film soundtracks and audio albums. The choir is most famous for its contribution to the double-platinum award-winning soundtrack to The Lord of the Rings film trilogy. Each of these three soundtracks won a Grammy Award For Best Score. The choir also works extensively for charity, helping raise funds for various charities including Macmillan Cancer Support, Save the Children and the Sharon Osbourne Colon Cancer Program.

The choir's patrons are Princess Michael of Kent, barrister Cherie Blair, actor Simon Callow, Cardinal Robert Sarah and composer Sir James MacMillan.

== Sport ==
=== Rugby ===
1st XV vs St Paul's (2014)

The traditional sport of the school is rugby and the London Oratory is commonly seen as a 'rugby school'. The school has won 58 Middlesex county championships to date, most recently in the 2021/22 season. Furthermore, a sizeable number of Oratorians have gone on to represent England at international level, both at junior and senior levels. At non-international level, several Oratorians have played in The Varsity Match, with two old boys playing for the Cambridge XV in 2007. All teams in the school compete in their respective leagues, including the Daily Mail Cup, which the U15 XV making it to the final in 1992. In the first form, rugby is compulsory. The majority of the 180 boys turn out to play most Saturdays for fixtures against other schools. By the VI form, the number of boys is reduced to a 1st and 2nd XV. Both the 1st and 2nd XV play a full calendar of matches over the course of the season, against fellow schools in the South East, including The Oratory School, Dulwich, St. Paul's, Wimbledon College, Eton, Berkhamsted and Harrow, as well as a number of schools from further afield. The first overseas rugby tour was to Galway, Ireland in 1971, winning all matches, which was followed in 1979 by a US tour to New York, Philadelphia and Washington DC. Tours continued to San Francisco in 1983, Canada in 1988 and Australia in 1990, winning two out of seven matches in the latter. The 1st XV and 2nd XV toured Australia in July 2011, including one game in Singapore, the first major tour for 21 years.

The school organises its own U12/U15 Sevens Tournament and also organises a national sevens competition at U16 level, which is held at London Irish. Rugby is played at the school's sports grounds at Barn Elms on the banks of the River Thames. Previous sports grounds used by the school include Hampstead Heath and the Duke of York's Headquarters. The house rugby competition also takes place in the Michaelmas term.

=== Cricket ===
Cricket at the Oratory tended to be more of a focus prior to the Second World War, with less success in the immediate post-war period. By the 1980s however, the fortunes of the school teams were improving and the U12 XI beat Latymer Upper School in the 1987 London Cup final. There are 4 cricket nets in the school grounds which are used for after school practice during the summer months. The school's cricket teams host matches at Barn Elms and play in a few county cups and leagues, for example the Middlesex Schools' Cup. Cricket is also the main sport in the Junior House.

=== Other sports ===
The school has a 17.5-meter, indoor swimming pool in its grounds. The school holds the Junior House swimming gala in the pool, as well as regular games lessons and waterpolo practice. The first annual swimming gala took place in 1882 and for many decades took place at the Chelsea Baths. Teams for the gala in recent decades has been organised by the housemasters.

There are no football teams at present who represent the school, however football had been the main sport of the school up until the 1960s and to this day each form from each house puts forward a team for the annual house football competition.

Rowing at the Oratory expanded somewhat in the mid 1960s and by 1965 there were enough boys for a decent eight. In 1980, Allan Whitwell joined the school staff and built up the rowing squad, which included boys who were already rowing at other clubs. Rowing disappeared for around a decade before being reorganised towards the end of the 1990s when the London Oratory School Boat Club acquired its first boat. By 2006, LOSBC had its first Schools' Head win in a coxed four. In 2012, the school won its first gold medal at the National Schools' Regatta, which was followed by the 1st VIII winning the 2016 Child Beale trophy, and qualifying for Henley Royal Regatta in 2015 and 2016. The boat club rowed out of Barn Elms for much of its existence, with a period at Putney Town Rowing Club, before moving to the Chiswick Boathouse next to Barnes Bridge in 2011. The boat club is now somewhat external to the school, managed by London Youth Rowing and races as The 1863 Club.

The London Oratory School Fencing Club was recently founded. Other sports offered by the school include volleyball, Gaelic football, tennis, netball, table tennis, hockey, angling, boxing and athletics, as well as lacrosse, skiing, sub-aqua, golf, basketball and horse riding being offered in the past. As well as the pool, the school has a newly renovated gym, which contains weights apparatus, bikes, treadmills and ergos.

== Patronal Festival ==
The School Patronal Festival Presentation of Awards

The tradition of marking St Philip's feast day began in 1936. The School celebrates its patronal festival with a Pontifical High Mass in Brompton Oratory on the feast of Saint Philip Neri, 26 May, or on the nearest Friday that falls during Trinity term. The Mass is followed immediately by the distribution of prizes to award winners and the presentation of ties and badges of office to the Senior Prefects by the outgoing Head of School. The official handing over of duties from the outgoing Senior Prefects to the incoming prefects occurs when the badges and ties of office are issued. All members of Staff traditionally wear full academic dress on this occasion.

The Principal Celebrant is usually a high-ranking official of the Catholic Church. Recent Celebrants have included:

- Cardinal Burke, Prefect of the Supreme Tribunal of the Apostolic Signatura (2013)
- Alan Hopes, Auxiliary Bishop of Westminster (2012)
- Paul Keane, Old Oratorian and Chaplain to the University of Essex (2011)
- Richard Duffield, Provost of the Birmingham Oratory (2010)
- Robert Byrne, Provost of the Oxford Oratory (2009)
- Patrick O'Donoghue, Bishop Emeritus of Lancaster (2008)
- Aidan Bellenger, Abbot of Downside (2007)
- Maurice Couve de Murville, Archbishop Emeritus of Birmingham (2006)
- Cuthbert Brogan, Abbot of Farnborough (2005)
- Alan Hopes, Auxiliary Bishop of Westminster (2004)
- George Stack, Auxiliary Bishop of Westminster (2003)
- Cardinal Cormac Murphy-O'Connor, Archbishop of Westminster (2002)
- Arthur Roche, Bishop of Leeds (2001)
- Victor Guazzelli, Auxiliary Bishop of Westminster (2000)
- The Abbot of Ampleforth (1999)
- The Catholic Chaplain to Harrow School (1998)
- The Provost of the London Oratory (1997)
- The Apostolic Nuncio (1996)
- Cardinal Basil Hume (1995)
- Stanislaus Hobbs of St Benedict's Abbey, Ealing (1994)
- The Master of St Benet's Hall, Oxford (1993)
- The Provost of the Oxford Oratory (1992).

Traditionally the Principal Celebrant preaches on the life of Saint Philip, with concluding comments directed to those pupils leaving the school.

The Guard of Honour is a tradition used by The London Oratory School for the Principal Celebrant of the Mass and senior guests. It is customary for the Combined Cadet Force, consisting of the Army and RAF divisions to mount the Guard of Honour before the Mass as the Principal Celebrant enters the Brompton Oratory. The London Oratory School CCF has been badged to the Irish Guards since 2010. Previously the Army Section wore the cap badge of the Royal Green Jackets. Major General W G Cubitt, CBE, Major General Commanding the Household Division and General Officer Commanding London District was the Reviewing Officer at the CCF Biennial Inspection and oversaw the re-badging, together with the regimental adjutant and staff from regimental headquarters, making the London Oratory CCF the only Combined Cadet Force badged to the Irish Guards and one of the few CCFs badged to a Household Division regiment.

Music at the Mass is provided by The Schola Cantorum and Chamber Choir assisted by The London Oratory Sinfonia. Organists for the ceremony have included David Terry, Nicholas O'Neill, Steven Grahl and Jeremy Filsell.

Awards are made both for curricular and extra-curricular aspects of school life. The conclusion of the patronal festival is traditionally marked with the school and congregation singing the school Song, "Quam bonum est". After Mass there is a reception for the Guests, Senior Prefects, award winners and their parents in Saint Wilfrid's Hall, which is adjacent to the Brompton Oratory.

== John McIntosh Arts Centre ==
The Arts Centre which was inaugurated in 1991 by the then Prime Minister John Major, has a 305-seat theatre, with fly-tower, dressing rooms and orchestra pit, art studios and gallery space, a pottery, music teaching rooms, music technology suites, small recording studio, a recital area, practice rooms and four classrooms dedicated to each of the Junior House classes. In the foyer there is a large bronze sculpture of Athena by Sir Eduardo Paolozzi and major series of his original prints. In December 2006 the Arts Centre was renamed the John McIntosh Arts Centre in honour of the recently retired headmaster.

Throughout the year there is a varied programme of concerts, recitals, plays, and exhibitions by pupils, parents and visiting artists and performers. In previous years the school has presented Macbeth, Twelfth Night, A Midsummer Night's Dream, The Taming of the Shrew, The Comedy of Errors, Much Ado about Nothing, and The Tempest, Molière's Le Bourgeois Gentilhomme and The Hypochondriac, Gogol's The Government Inspector, Shaw's The Devil's Disciple and Pygmalion, Beckett's Endgame, Edward Bond's The Sea and Stone, Toad of Toad Hall, The Elephant Man, a number of one act plays including four by Chekhov, Arthur Miller's The Crucible and A View from the Bridge, Oscar Wilde's The Importance of Being Earnest, Peter Shaffer's Black Comedy, Noël Coward's Blithe Spirit, Alan Bennett's Habeas Corpus, and a production of Lewis Carroll's Alice in Wonderland. The sixth form usually put on two productions a year, with a play in the Michaelmas term and a musical in the Lent term.

== Controversies ==
In 2000, Father David Martin was accused of sexually abusing pupils through letters from anonymous students at the school. David Martin, who died in September 1998 of HIV-related illnesses, had been acting chaplain at the Oratory School from 1997 to 1998. Childline confirmed that they had been contacted by young people making allegations of abuse at the school. Claims about his conduct were also detailed in letters to Hammersmith and Fulham social services, the Archbishop of Westminster and to national newspapers in late October 2000.

Hammersmith and Fulham council considered there to be "no evidence with which to base any further investigations, because the letter was anonymous, there was no specific allegation of child abuse, and obviously Father Martin was dead." A spokesman for the Westminster diocese said: "Naturally the church is deeply concerned whenever any allegations are made against a priest and especially if there are any victims of abuse. Any allegations need to be fully investigated and the church authorities will cooperate fully." Father Ignatius Harrison, main chaplain at the Oratory School was fully aware of the investigation, stating that there had never been any concerns about Father Martin's behaviour. Hammersmith and Fulham social services, with the police, launched an investigation, which stalled due to the unclear lines of responsibility – Father Martin was chaplain at the school for four terms but was employed not by them but by the Oratory Fathers. Child protection officers attempted to establish the identity of the boy who made the complaints, only having his first name. There have been no further updates since December 2000.

== Notable Old London Oratorians ==
- William Bennett Kilpack (1883–1962), actor and director
- Gene Lockhart (1891–1957), actor
- Alan Mowbray (1896–1969), actor
- Stephen M. Collins, gastroenterologist
- Jackie Burns (1906–1986), England amateur footballer
- Leo Quinn (born 1956), British business executive
- Michael Rizzello (1926–2004), sculptor
- Tony Geraghty (born 1932), writer and journalist
- Brian Duffy (1933–2010), filmmaker, photographer
- Peter Egan (born 1946), actor
- Simon Callow (born 1949), actor
- Jerry Hayes (born 1952), barrister and former Conservative MP
- Simon Gipps-Kent (1958–1987), actor
- Ed Ball (born 1959), Post-punk musician from the band Television Personalities
- Mick Whelan (born 1960), General Secretary of the Associated Society of Locomotive Engineers and Firemen (ASLEF)
- Kervin Marc (born 1975), cricketer
- Charles Ejogo (born 1976), entrepreneur
- Michael Swift (born 1977), Irish rugby union player
- George Abbott (born 2005), English footballer
- Wayne Andrews (born 1977), English footballer
- Hayley Atwell (born 1982), actress
- Euan Blair (born 1984), entrepreneur and son of Prime Minister Tony Blair
- Nick Blair (born 1985), entrepreneur, former football agent, and brother of Euan Blair
- John Kearns (born 1987), comedian
- Beno Obano (born 1994), rugby player
- Diarmaid O'Neill (1969–1996), militant
- The Safety Fire, pop music band
- Victor Ceserani (1919–2017), writer
- Dan Treacy, Post-punk musician from the band Television Personalities
- Colin Hegarty, creator of HegartyMaths
- Michael (Mick) Lynch (born 1962), trade unionist and former general secretary of the RMT.

== Arms ==
Coat of arms of London Oratory School
Notes Granted in 1995. Crest On a wreath Argent and Gules, issuant from a celestial crown Or a demi-Lion Bleu Celeste grasping a staff Or flying therefrom to the sinister a pennant Argent charged with six gouttes in fess Gules. Escutcheon Gules a bar wavy Argent between three mullets of eight points Or. Motto 'Respice Finem'
