= Michael Scott Napier =

British Roman Catholic Priest

Michael Scott Napier (15 February 1929 – 22 August 1996) was a British Roman Catholic priest. He was an Oratorian Father of the London Oratory from 1959 until his death, and twice served as its provost (1969–1981; 1991–1994). He also served as the pope's Apostolic Visitor to the Oratory of St Philip Neri, 63 Oratories worldwide, between 1982 and 1994.

== Early life ==
Napier was born on 15 February 1929 in India, the only child of Major-General Charles Scott Napier, a decorated British Army engineer, and his wife Ada Kathleen Napier (née Douetil). His father was an Anglican and his mother was a French convert to Catholicism. He was educated at Wellington College, then an all-boys private boarding school. He then studied at Trinity Hall, Cambridge, graduating with a Bachelor of Arts (BA) degree in 1952. While at Cambridge, he converted to Roman Catholicism under the instruction of the university's Catholic chaplain, Alfred Gilbey: he was received into the Catholic Church in October 1952. After graduation, he spent a year working the City of London.

== Religious life ==
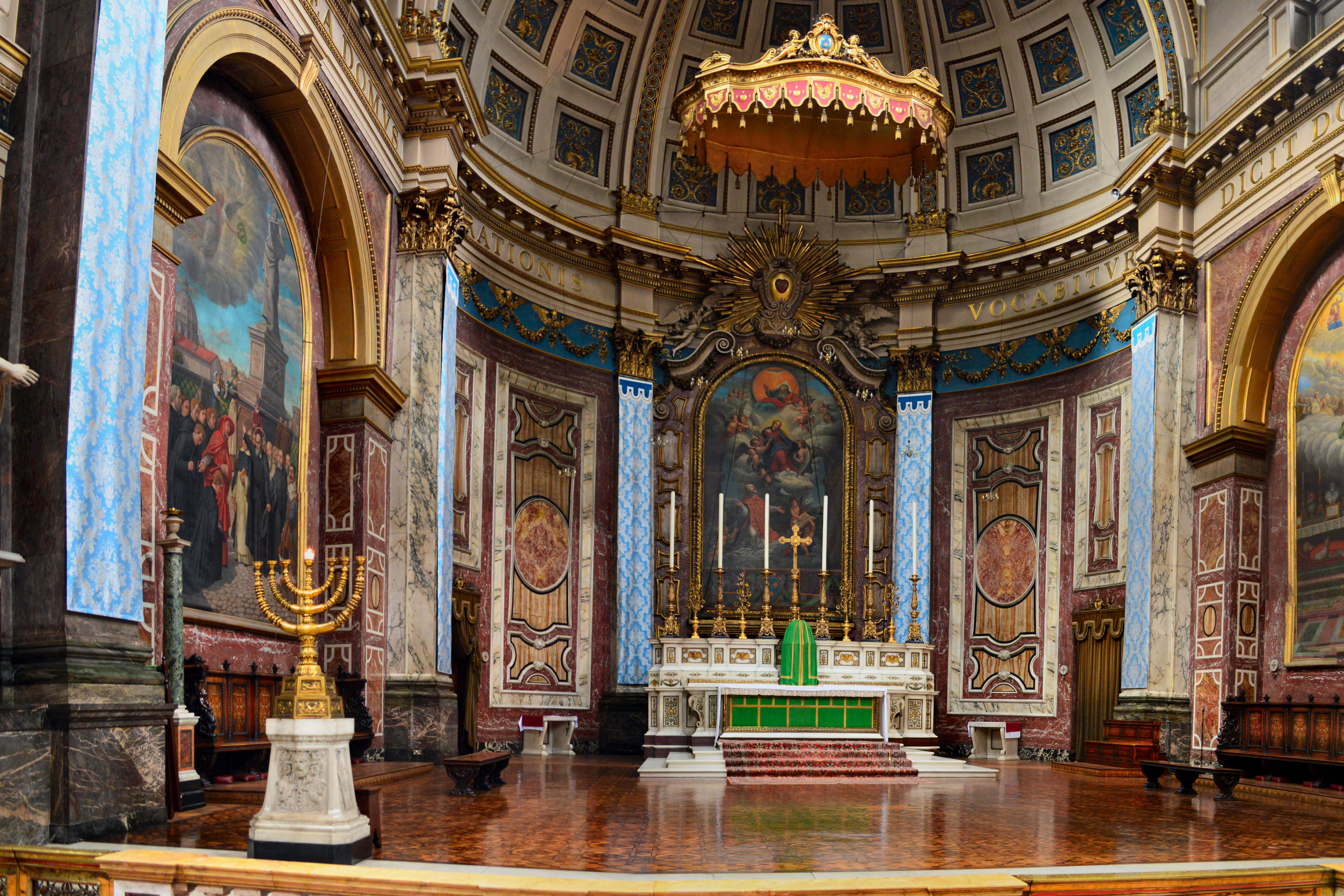
High Altar of the Brompton Oratory

Napier entered the London Oratory as a novice in November 1953: the Congregation of the Oratory of Saint Philip Neri is a society of apostolic life of priests and lay brothers who live in community without formal vows. As part of his formation, he attended the Pontifical Beda College in Rome. He was ordained to the priesthood in 1959.

He was first elected Provost of the London Oratory in 1969, and was re-elected for a further three terms. During this time, he had to lead the community through the changes of the Second Vatican Council: he did not, however, introduce a nave altar but maintained the centrality of the high altar. In 1981, he was chosen to undertake a canonical visitation of the Oratories worldwide as Visitor of Holy See. He stepped down as provost in 1982, and undertook the visitation of 63 Oratories worldwide between 1982 and 1994. With each Oratory maintaining its autonomy, this was not an easy task, but he perceived and had a strong influence on the young congregations in Vienna and Toronto. In 1991, he returned to the London Oratory and was once more elected for a three-year term as provost. From 1994 to his death in 1996, he was but an ordinary Oratorian Father.

Napier died on 22 August 1996 at the foot of the altar of Brompton Oratory (the London Oratory's church), having suffered a brain haemorrhage shortly before he was due to celebrate Mass.
