= Vengeful =

Vengeful may refer to:

- Desiring revenge
- Vengeful, a British military intelligence system in Northern Ireland
