= Michael McCarthy (choirmaster) =

British-American choral director

Michael McCarthy [BEM] is an English choir director who served as Canon for Music at Washington National Cathedral from 2003 to 2024. Previously, he was the founding director of the London Oratory School Schola at the London Oratory in London. In addition to liturgical duties, the Schola recorded for the film scores of Sleepy Hollow, The Lord of the Rings film trilogy, and the Harry Potter series. McCarthy also worked with The Sixteen, the Gabrieli Consort, The Cardinall's Musick and the Monteverdi Choir.

As a composer/arranger, his music was featured at the funerals of US Presidents Ronald Reagan, Gerald R. Ford, and George H. W. Bush, and the service for the second inauguration of George W. Bush, all events held at Washington National Cathedral. The Cathedral choirs have also recorded some of his music, such as "O Love of God" and "Lord of the Dance" on the CD entitled, "America the Beautiful" (2005).

In June 2025, McCarthy was included in The King’s Birthday Honours as a BEM: British Empire Medal for his services to music and to UK/US relations through his work at Washington National Cathedral.

== Positions held ==
- Canon for Music and Director of Institutional Planning at Washington National Cathedral, Washington, DC
- Conductor of the Cathedral Choirs of Men, Boys, and Girls
- Director of the London Oratory School Schola Cantorum
- Choirmaster of St Georges RC Church Choir, Sudbury, Middlesex.
