= Brompton Oratory =

- Church of the Immaculate Heart of Mary
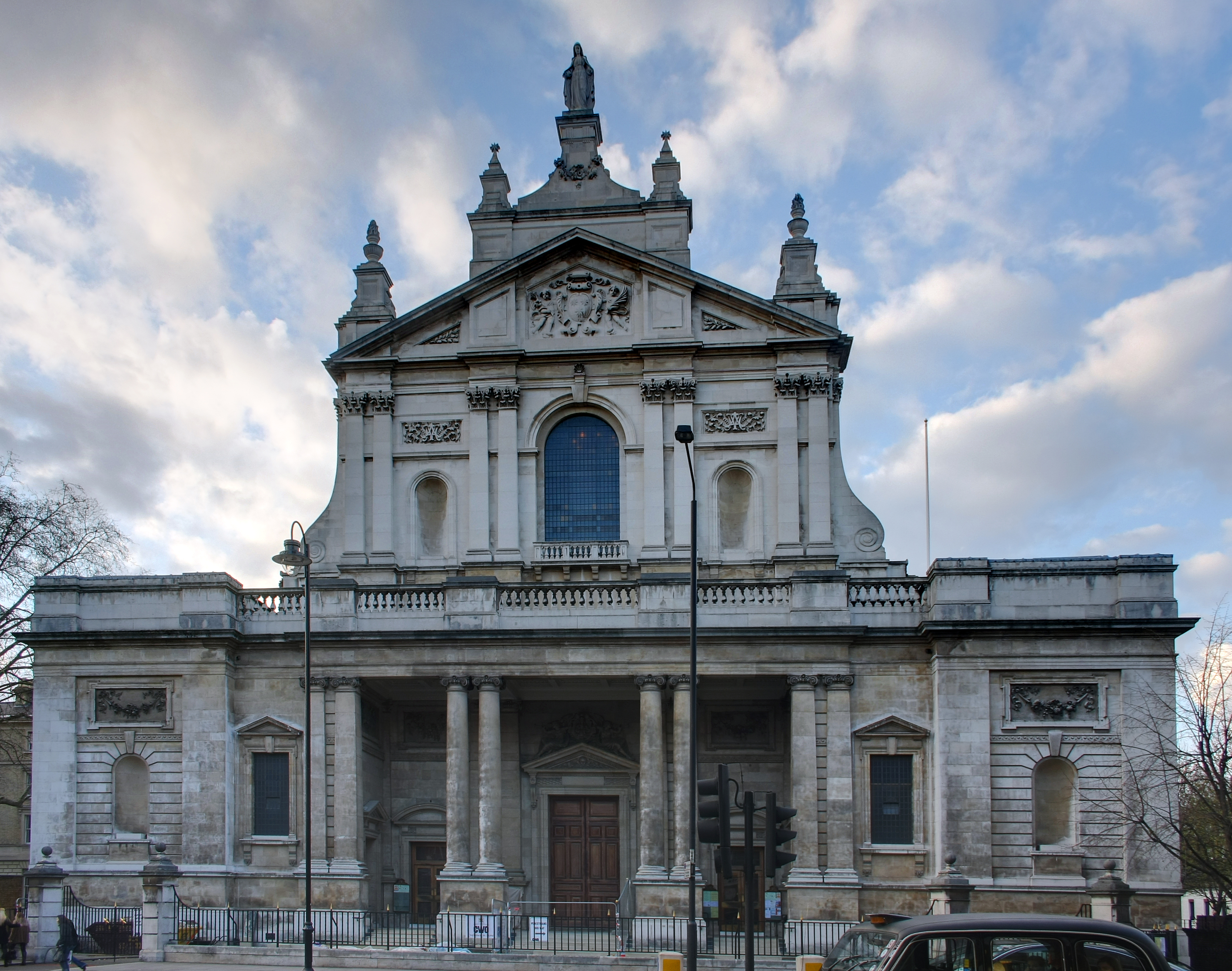
- Facade
- Brompton Oratory
- 51°29′50″N 0°10′11″W
- OS grid reference: TQ 27156 79165
- Location: Brompton Road, Knightsbridge, London
- Country: England
- Denomination: Catholic Church
- Website: bromptonoratory.co.uk

History
- Status: Parish church
- Founder: Frederick William Faber C.O.
- Dedication: Immaculate Heart of Mary
- Consecrated: 1884

Architecture
- Functional status: Active
- Architect(s): Herbert Gribble; George Campbell Sherrin; E. A. Rickards; C. T. G. Formilli; Russell Taylor
- Style: Italian Baroque
- Groundbreaking: 1880
- Completed: 1884

Specifications
- Materials: Portland stone

Administration
- Province: Westminster
- Diocese: Westminster
- Deanery: Kensington and Chelsea
- Parish: Oratory

Clergy
- Archbishop: Vincent Nichols
- Rector: Julian Large C.O.
- Priest(s): John Fordham C.O. Ronald Creighton-Jobe C.O. George Bowen C.O. Patrick Doyle C.O. Rupert McHardy C.O. Uwe Michael LangC.O. Edward van den Bergh C.O. James Tabarelli C.O. Joseph Rodrigues C.O.

Listed Building – Grade II*
- Official name: The Oratory
- Designated: 15 April 1969
- Reference no.: 1358123

Brompton Oratory, also known as the London Oratory, is a Catholic parish church in the Brompton area of the Royal Borough of Kensington and Chelsea, London. Its name stems from the Oratorians, who live next door in the Oratory House and service the parish. The formal title of the church is the Church of the Immaculate Heart of Mary. Mass is celebrated daily by the Oratorians in both the Ordinary and Extraordinary forms.

The church was consecrated in 1884 and is built in the Neo-Baroque style and consists of a three-bay nave, transepts, and an apsed chancel with a dome over the crossing. It is listed at grade II* for its architectural significance.

Due to its location and character, the church attracts expatriate worshippers and visitors from many countries. After World War II, it temporarily hosted the parish of the Polish diaspora in London. The church has a reputation for the quality of its liturgical music and the notable musicians who perform there, among them the late Ralph Downes. There are three choirs at the church. The London Oratory School in the nearby London Borough of Hammersmith and Fulham is closely connected to the church, having been founded by the Oratorians.

== Location ==
The church is on the A4 where it becomes Brompton Road, next to the Victoria and Albert Museum, where the street briefly becomes Thurloe Place and Cromwell Gardens but after that neighbouring museum the road becomes Cromwell Road which gradually widens via the Hammersmith Flyover into the M4. The A308 road starts opposite the building which takes up the name Brompton Road. It therefore marks an important junction.

== History ==
=== Foundation ===
Saint John Henry Newman was received into the Catholic Church in 1845. He went on to found the Birmingham Oratory, inspired by its patron, the Italian Saint Philip Neri. Other former Anglicans, including Frederick William Faber, briefly established a London Oratory in premises near Charing Cross. Faber's growing following of faithful purchased a 3.5-acre (14,000 m^{2}) property in November 1852 for £16,000, in the then rapidly developing suburb and former village of Brompton, later to become subsumed under the name South Kensington. This was the result from the closure of adjacent Brompton underground station and opening of the South Kensington tube station further west, to channel the crowds visiting the newly established museums. An Oratory House was built first, followed shortly by a temporary church. both designed by Joseph John Scoles. An appeal was then launched in 1874 to fund a church building. The new church was consecrated in 1884. Next to the Oratory House is a chapel, known as "the Little Oratory".

The church still belongs to, and is served by, the Congregation of the London Oratory (see London Oratory).

=== Modern day ===
After World War II, with the resettlement of thousands of Polish Allied servicemen (many of them Catholics) coming to Britain, South Kensington became a temporary Polish hub. Nearby were the offices of the Polish government-in-exile, the Polish Hearth Club and Polish Institute and Sikorski Museum among other meeting places for exiles. A Polish Solemn Mass was held every Sunday at 1 pm from 1945 until 1962 while the Polish community migrated westwards in the capital and the Polish Catholic Mission was able to establish in 1962 a parish at St Andrew Bobola Church, Hammersmith.

During the Cold War, the area between the pillars and the wall at the front of the Brompton Oratory was used as a dead drop by Soviet spies in Britain, from where they hoped to communicate with Moscow.

In September 2010 decorative banners were erected at the Brompton Oratory to celebrate the beatification of Cardinal Newman during the Pope's visit to London.

April 2018 saw the establishment of the Catholic Military Association, whose inaugural meeting was held in St Joseph's Hall.

== Architecture ==
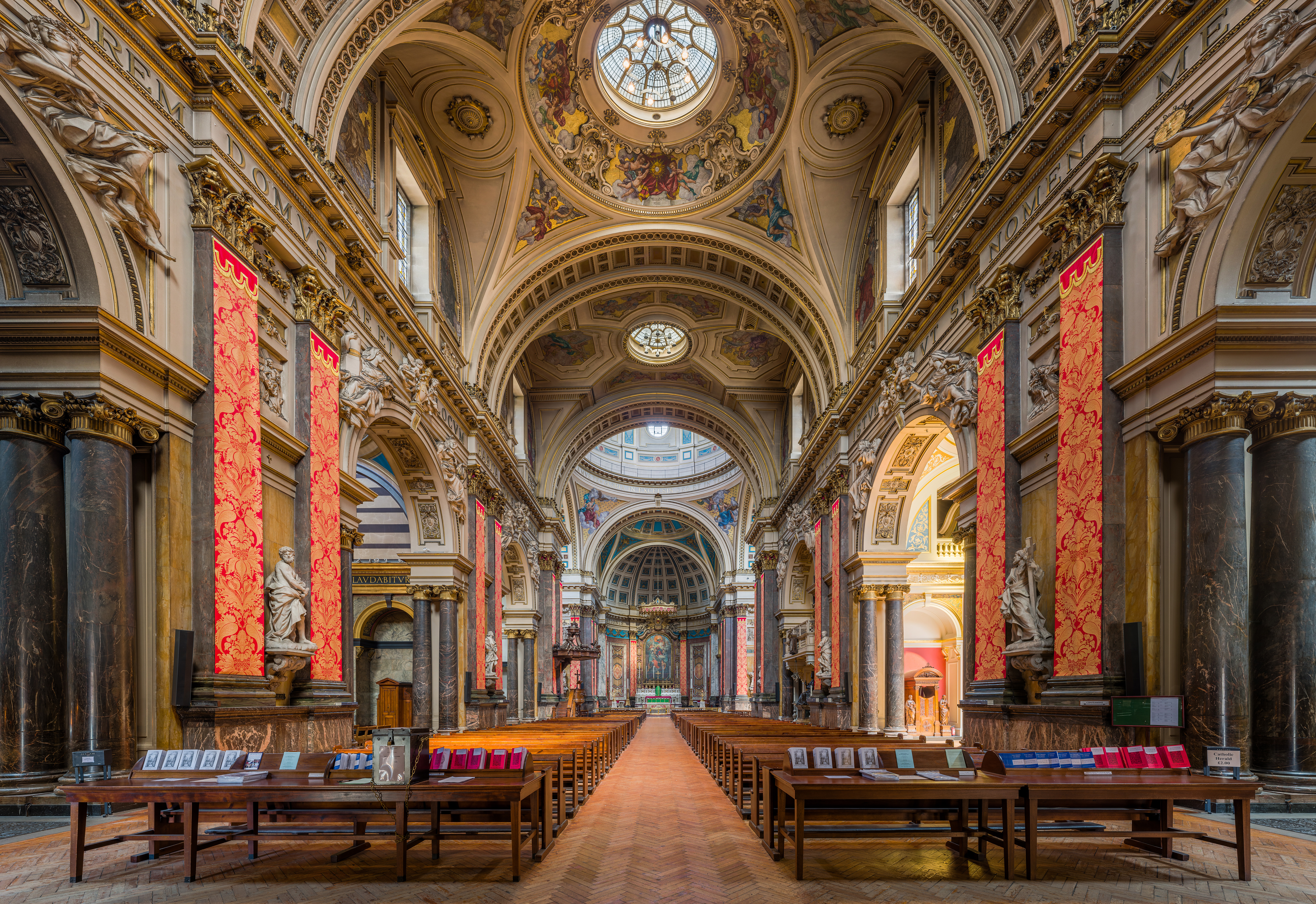
Nave of the oratory church

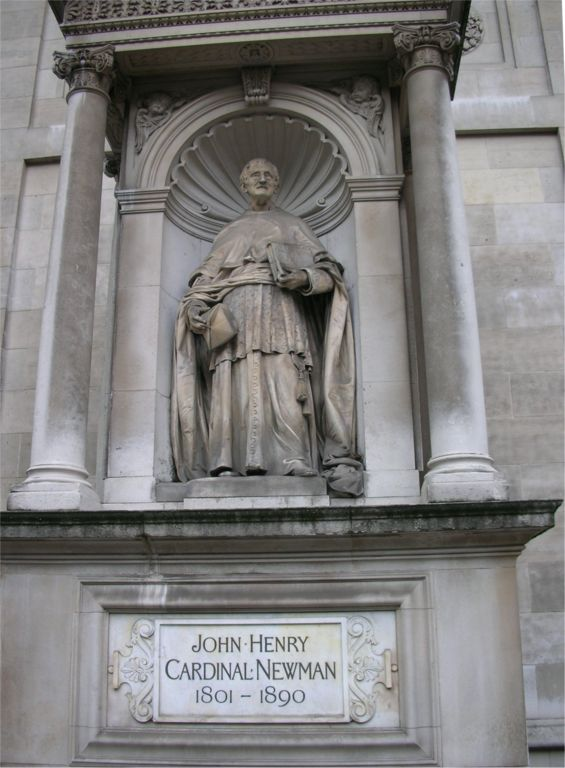
Statue of Cardinal Newman statue outside the church

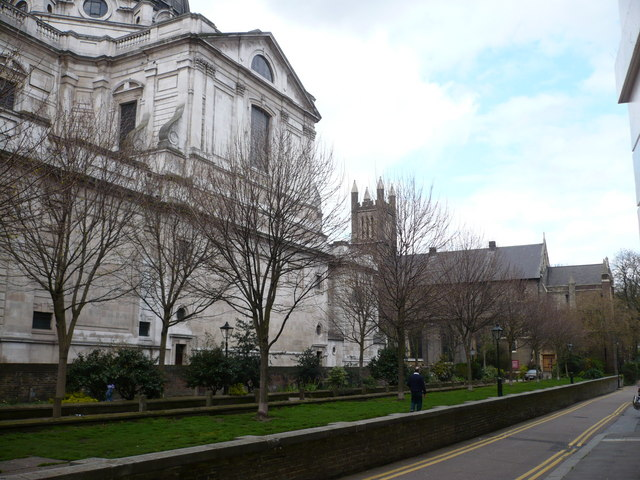
Brompton Oratory and, in the background, Holy Trinity Church

A design from Herbert Gribble, then 29, won a competition in March 1869. The foundation stone was laid in June 1869; and the new church was consecrated on 16 April 1884. The church is faced in Portland stone, with the vaults and dome in concrete; the latter was heightened in profile and the cupola added in 1869, standing 200 feet (61 m) tall. It was the largest Catholic church in London before the opening of Westminster Cathedral in 1903.

The competition specified the "Italian Renaissance" style, but the Roman Baroque and Wren are also drawn on. Devon marble is used in the major order of pilasters and the minor order of columns, with more exotic marbles in the apse and the altars, with carvings in metalwork, plasterwork, wood and stone. It houses Italian Baroque sculpture: The Twelve Apostles by Giuseppe Mazzuoli (1644-1725) acquired from Siena Cathedral in 1895 and the Lady Altar, with sculptures by Tommaso Rues (1650–1690 ca.). The architectonical structure of the altar, originally decorating a chapel dedicated to the rosary, was acquired from the church of San Domenico Brescia after its demolition in 1883. Gribble's decorative scheme for the apse was not proceeded with, but the decoration of the St Wilfrid and the St Mary Magdalene chapels do reflect his intentions. The St Philip Neri altar is to his design. Gribble's intended dome for the building was not built before his death, and in 1894 a new design by George Campbell Sherrin, with a lantern by his assistant E. A. Rickards, was chosen and built between 1895-1896. The second great decorative campaign (1927–32) was by the Italian architect C. T. G. Formilli, in mosaic, plaster and woodwork, the cost exceeding his estimate of £31,000. Further decoration marked the 1984 centenary. The reredos of Doric columns in yellow scagliola (2006) of the St Joseph chapel and a new altar and reredos of Cardinal Newman (2010) are by Russell Taylor. The statue of Newman in cardinal's robes (1896) is by Léon-Joseph Chavalliaud in an architectural setting by Thomas Gaming. The church boasts elaborate vestments and altar plate and houses a notable library.

== Parish ==
The Church of the Immaculate Heart of Mary (The Oratory) is a parish church, part of the Archdiocese of Westminster at whose request the parish is run by the priests of the oratory. It is part of the Kensington and Chelsea deanery.

=== Events ===
The church has strong ties with the nearby London Oratory School, which has Mass at the church for certain Holy Days of Obligation and feastdays. The school's annual patronal festival in honour of St Philip Neri is celebrated at the oratory.

In front of the statue of Saint Peter under the choir loft (a reproduction of that fronting St Peter's Basilica) the medieval dedication of England to Saint Peter and the Blessed Virgin Mary was repeated by Cardinal Vaughan as a defiant riposte to the Erastianism of the established church. The congregation is one of the largest Catholic congregations in London.

== Liturgy ==
It is part of the tradition of the oratory in England to ensure that the liturgy is celebrated in a dignified and worthy manner. Mass is celebrated every day in Latin in the ordinary and the extraordinary (Tridentine) forms of the Roman Rite.

== Choirs ==
The London Oratory is internationally known as one of the custodians of classic Catholic liturgical traditions. Solemn Latin Mass and Vespers are celebrated on all Sundays and obligatory holy days in the year. In particular, the great liturgies of Christmas, Holy Week and Easter attract packed congregations.

The Oratory Fathers have fostered a notable musical establishment comprising three separate choirs plus a professional music staff.

=== Senior choir ===
The London Oratory Choir is an adult professional chamber choir serving the major liturgical celebrations in the Oratory church, including solemn Latin Mass and Vespers on all the Sundays of the year and for major feasts. Dating from the establishment of the London Oratory on its present Brompton Road site in 1854, the London Oratory Choir is England's senior professional Catholic choir, and has an international reputation as one of the world's leading exponents of choral music within the traditional Roman Rite, noted especially for its performances of Renaissance polyphony and the Masses of the Classical Viennese school. Recent directors of music have included Henry Washington (1935–1971), John Hoban (1971–1995), Andrew Carwood (1995–1999) and Patrick Russill (1999–present).

=== Junior choir ===
The London Oratory Junior Choir was founded in 1973 by John Hoban to give boys and girls together an opportunity to serve the liturgy in a great church. In addition to singing regularly one evening service and one Sunday (English) Mass every week, the Oratory Junior Choir is also active outside the Oratory. Noted for its free tone and forthright delivery, it has appeared in all London's major concert halls and at the Proms, with conductors including Andrew Parrott, Nicholas Kraemer and Sir John Eliot Gardiner (including prize-winning recordings of Monteverdi's Vespers in St Mark's Basilica in Venice, and Bach's St Matthew Passion). Since 1979 it has provided the children's chorus for Royal Ballet productions at the Royal Opera House, Covent Garden. It can also be heard on the soundtrack to Harry Potter and the Deathly Hallows – Part 1 and Harry Potter and the Deathly Hallows – Part 2. From 1984 its director was Patrick Russill and since 2005 its director has been Charles Cole.

=== Schola ===
The London Oratory School Schola choir was founded in 1996. Educated in the Junior House of the London Oratory School in Fulham (London), boys from the age of 7 are given choral and instrumental training within a musical environment underpinned by Catholic traditions. The Schola is regarded as one of London's leading boys' choirs and sings at the Saturday 6.00 pm Mass in term time, at daily prayer services and at Benediction in the school chapel. The director of the Schola is Charles Cole. In addition to liturgical and concert performances, the choir has recorded The Lord of the Rings film series soundtracks. Its audio albums have mainly been joint albums with minor collaboration in performing Leonard Bernstein's reflective spiritual works or with soloist Roxanna Panufnik.

== Organ ==
Brompton Oratory has had a rich organ tradition since that of the Downes organ; its organists have been: Ralph Downes (1936–1977), Patrick Russill (1977–99), John McGreal (1999–2011), Matthew Martin (2011-2017) and Ben Bloor (2017-present). The organ of 45 stops, 3 manuals and pedals, built by J. W. Walker & Sons Ltd from 1952 to 1954 to the specification of Ralph Downes, was the first church organ in London to be built on neo-classical lines.

== Notable weddings and ceremonies ==
Year	Ceremony
1865	Stéphane Mallarmé married Marie Gerhard
1889	Edward Elgar married Alice Roberts
1891	Ernest Dowson officially confirmed as a Catholic at the church
1918	Matyla Ghyka married Eileen O'Conor
1926	Alfred Hitchcock married Alma Reville
1933	Charles Francis Sweeny married Margaret Wigham
1941	Gertrude Elizabeth Margaret Anscombe married Peter Thomas Geach
1974	James Hunt married Suzy Miller
1992	Marco Pierre White married Lisa Butcher

Catholic aristocrats who married at the church include John Crichton-Stuart, 3rd Marquess of Bute, and Gwendoline Fitzalan-Howard (1872), Lord William Beauchamp Nevill and Mabel Murietta (1889), Bernard Fitzalan-Howard, 16th Duke of Norfolk, and Lavinia Strutt (1937), Simon Fraser, 15th Lord Lovat, and Rosamund Broughton (1938), Peter Kerr, 12th Marquess of Lothian, and Antonella Newland (1943), Anthony Noel, 5th Earl of Gainsborough, and Mary Stourton (1947) and Julian Asquith, 2nd Earl of Oxford and Asquith, and Anne Palairet (1947). Others who married at the church include Lord of Appeal in Ordinary Baron Russell of Killowen, traveller and landowner John Talbot Clifton and author Violet Clifton (1907) and Australian rules footballer Joe Fogarty (24 December 1916).

== Popular culture ==
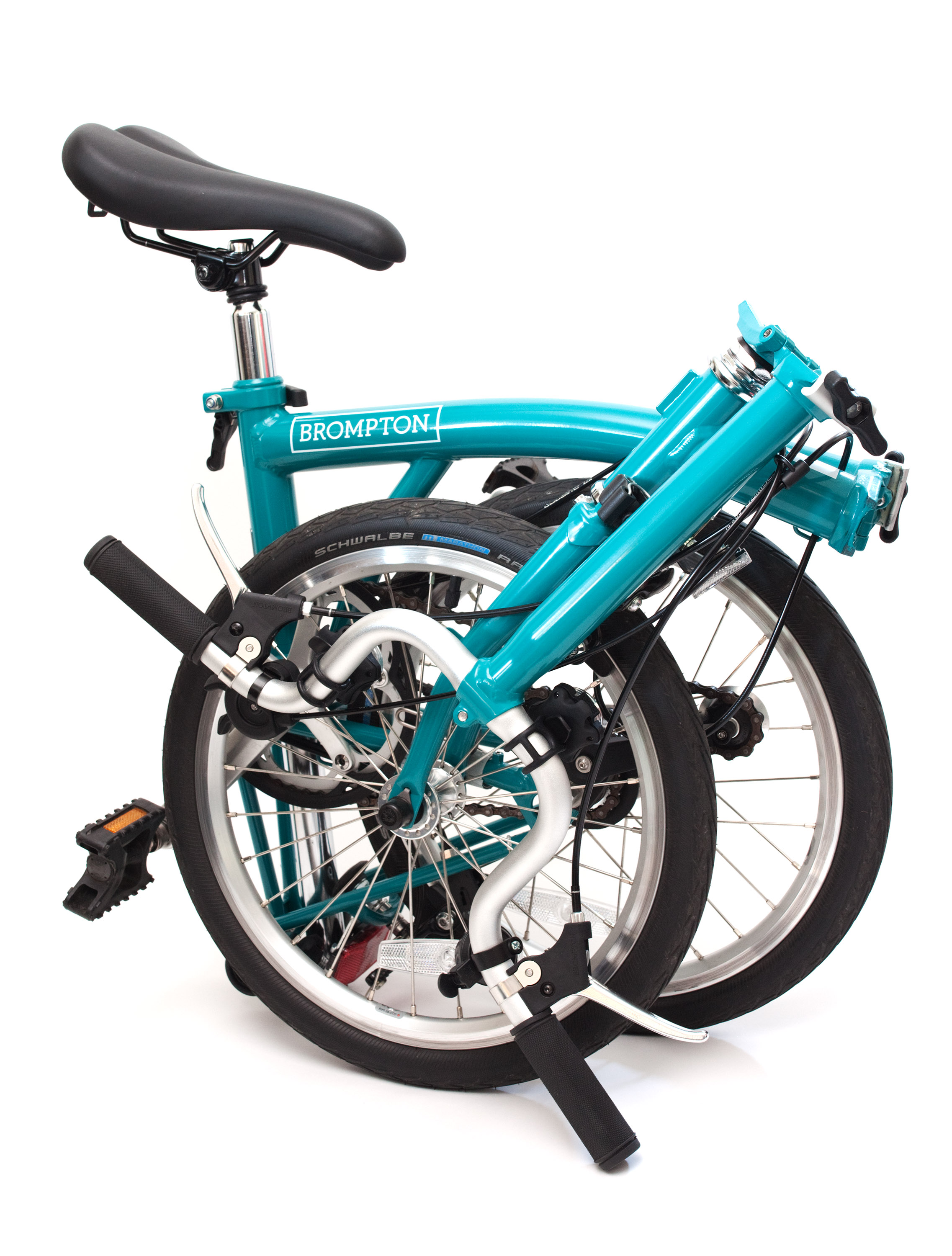
A folded Brompton B75

Brompton Oratory is said to have inspired the name of a British-made folding bicycle with small wheels intended for commuters, the Brompton Bicycle.

Attending a service at Brompton Oratory following a relationship breakup inspired Australian singer and songwriter Nick Cave to write the song "Brompton Oratory", included on Cave's 1997 album The Boatman's Call.
