= Tony Geraghty =

British-Irish writer and journalist ((1932–2024)

Anthony Joseph Vincent Geraghty (13 January 1932 – 27 December 2024) was a British-Irish writer and journalist. He served in the Parachute Regiment, and was awarded the Joint Service Commendation Medal for his work as a military liaison officer with U.S. forces during the Gulf War. He was a journalist for The Boston Globe and was the Sunday Times Defence Correspondent in the 1970s.

== Life and career ==
Geraghty was born in Liverpool on 13 January 1932, to an Irish Catholic family. He was educated at the London Oratory.

During the Falls Curfew in July 1970, while on assignment for the Sunday Times, Geraghty was arrested by a soldier and charged with impeding the Army by being on the street against military orders, which carried an automatic prison sentence on conviction. In September 1970, a magistrate ruled he had no case to answer, and acquitted him.

His 1998 book The Irish War: The Hidden Conflict Between the IRA and British Intelligence was written following research which included interviews with members of MI5, British security forces and the Provisional Irish Republican Army. It describes the various tactics, both military and political, used by both sides in the Troubles in Northern Ireland.

Publishers Weekly called the book "highly opinionated" but praised "its attention to detail and its direct, potent writing." Library Journal said "[t]he role of British Intelligence in Ulster has never been so deeply explored".

On 3 December 1998 Geraghty's house was searched and he was interviewed by the Ministry of Defence Police and in May 1999, he was charged with breaching section 5 of the Official Secrets Act 1989 on the basis that he quoted from classified Army documents in the book. The Army was concerned that in mentioning their Caister/Crucible computer intelligence databases for tracking the Northern Irish population, and the Vengeful-Glutton number plate recognition and vehicle tracking system, he might have been in possession of copies of the documents.

The case was dropped in November 2000.

He wrote several books on the Special Air Service. The Bullet Catchers is a history of close protection bodyguards.

Geraghty died in Hereford, England on 27 December 2024, at the age of 92.

== Books ==
- Who Dares Wins: The Story of the Special Air Service, 1950–1980, 1980, (ISBN 085368457X)
- This is the SAS: A Pictorial History of the Special Air Service Regiment, 1982 (ISBN 0853685223)
- March or Die: A New History of the French Foreign Legion, 1987, (ISBN 0816017948)
- The Bullet Catchers, 1989, (ISBN 0586206221)
- BRIXMIS: The Untold Exploits of Britain's Most Daring Cold War Spy Mission, 1997, (ISBN 0006386733)
- The Irish War: The Hidden Conflict Between the IRA and British Intelligence, 1998, (ISBN 0801864569)
- Guns for Hire: The Inside Story of Freelance Soldiering, 2007, (ISBN 978-0-7499-2873-5)

== See also ==
- British military intelligence systems in Northern Ireland
