= London Oratory School Schola =

London Oratory School Schola in performance

The London Oratory School Schola is a choir for Catholic boys of the London Oratory School established in 1996 by John McIntosh CBE. The current director of the Schola is Charles Cole. The choir's patrons are Princess Michael of Kent, barrister Cherie Blair, actor Simon Callow, Cardinal Robert Sarah and composer Sir James MacMillan.

== Musical directors ==
The choir's founding director was Michael McCarthy. After seven years with the Schola, McCarthy moved to the US to become the director of music at Washington National Cathedral. He was succeeded by Steven Grahl, who is now organist of Christ Church Cathedral, Oxford. He was followed by Lee Ward, who combined work as director of the Schola with his duties as director of music at the London Oratory School. Lee Ward left the school in July 2012 to take up a new post in São Paulo, Brazil before returning to the UK as director of music at Liverpool Cathedral. Since September 2012 the director of the Schola has been Charles Cole, formerly director of the Schola Cantorum at the Cardinal Vaughan Memorial School in London.

== Performances ==
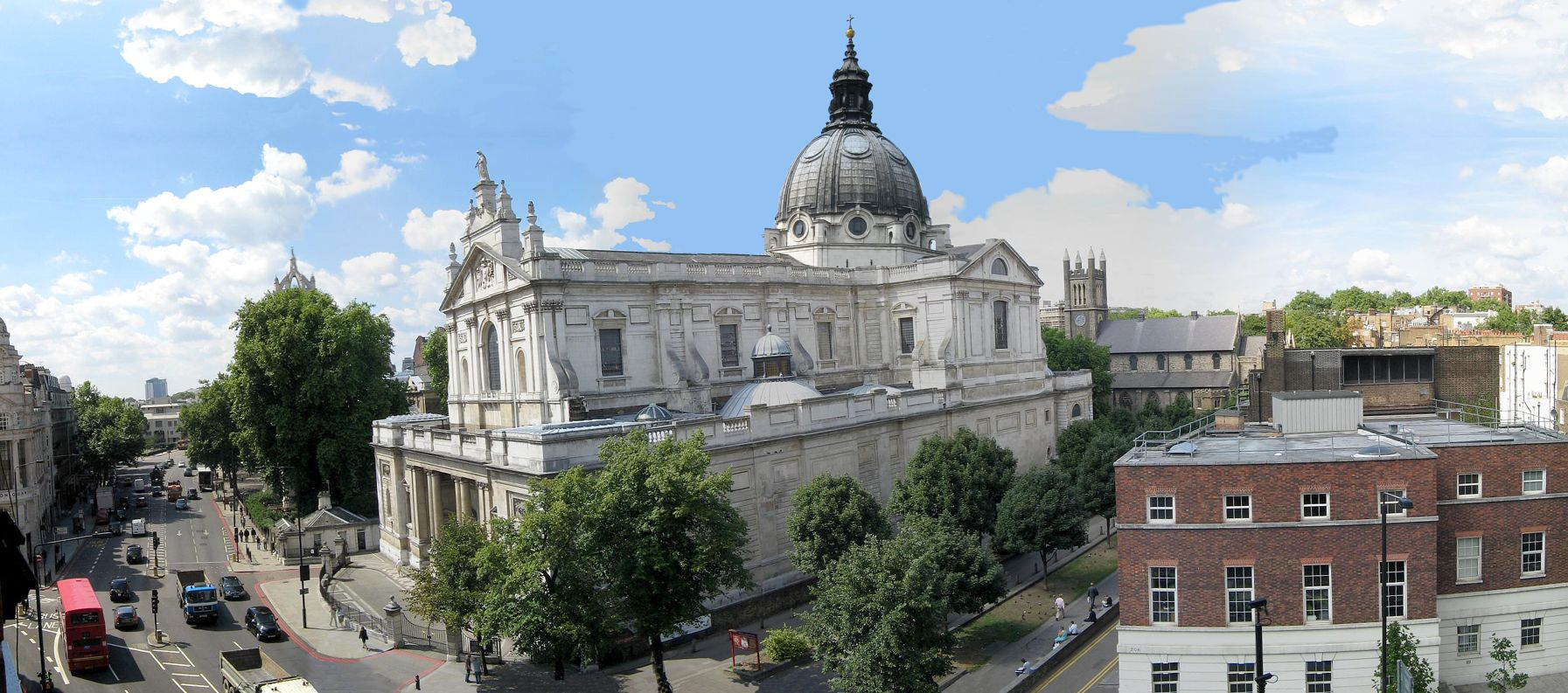
The London Oratory church

An annual performance is the Schola Foundation Concert. This concert featured the world premiere of Roxanna Panufnik's "Schola Missa de Angelis" – a work written for the choir. The London Oratory Schola Foundation is a charity set up to help finance the Schola and its work. Past concerts have included Panufnik's Westminster Mass, Britten's St Nicholas, Jenkins' Armed Man, Haydn's Missa in tempore belli and many sacred choral works.

Other recent Schola concerts include the 2009 and 2010 performances at the Royal Albert Hall of The Lord of the Rings Fellowship of the Ring and The Two Towers soundtracks. The Schola has also performed with 'The Priests' in Dublin's St Peter's Cathedral and in London's Cadogan Hall, the former being broadcast on BBC Radio Ulster. In November 2008 the choir performed in a concert for Save the Children at St Paul's Cathedral. On 7 July 2007 the Schola performed a concert in Rome, backed by the Vatican, with the Orchestra Philarmonia Di Roma. The concert, written by Michael D’Alessandra, aimed to recall the glory of Rome.

The choir's concert for World AIDS Day took place at the Cadogan Hall in London on 1 December 2007. . All proceeds from the concert went to the SURF Fund (a campaign which works in Rwanda campaigning for free anti-retroviral treatment for survivors of the genocide, and provides medical support to reduce the effect of opportunistic infections) and SOS Children's Villages (a charity working in Swaziland to provide resources for those living with AIDS and to help prevent family abandonment).

== Controversy ==
The schola was involved in some controversy in November 2007. For its performance for a World AIDS Day concert, the beneficiary, the Terrence Higgins Trust, was abruptly dropped one month before the concert was to take place.

David McFadden, the headmaster of The London Oratory School, claimed that the nominated charity did not support Christian values so the school could not support the charity from the proceeds of the concert.

In response, actor Simon Callow threatened to resign as patron of a choir at the school in protest. He was also a patron of the Terrence Higgins Trust.

== Recordings ==
=== Film soundtracks ===
The choir has also featured on many film soundtracks including Fantastic Mr. Fox, The Lord of the Rings film trilogy, The Phantom of the Opera, The Golden Compass, The Brothers Grimm and Harry Potter and the Prisoner of Azkaban.

=== Audio recordings ===
The Schola released a recording of Ave Maria's on the Regent record label in 2008, with a recording of the music of contemporary British composer Roxanna Panufnik due in November 2009. The choir recorded an album of Christmas Carols, 'Songs of a Shepherd' in 2001, released on the Herald AV record label.

In 2007 the Schola worked with the choir of an orphanage in Harare, Zimbabwe, to record a version of the popular Christmas carol Silent Night. The orphanage cares for children who were abandoned or whose parents died, largely due to AIDS. This recording supported, and was launched on, the World AIDS Day. Over 50% of the purchase price goes directly to the orphanage in order to assist it with its work. In 2008 The London Oratory School Schola recorded with Icelandic band Sigur Rós on their song Ára Bátur for their new album Með suð í eyrum við spilum endalaust, recorded on the Christmas album of Faith Hill and Andrew Johnston, runner-up from Britain's Got Talent, in 2009 the choir featured on albums of 'The Priests' and Camilla Kerslake.

== Gallery ==
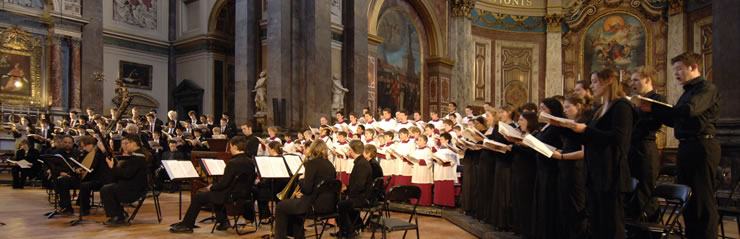
The London Oratory School Schola performing at the Brompton Oratory on 9 December 2006

The London Oratory School Schola performing in Rome
