= Faith of Our Fathers (hymn) =

1849 Catholic hymn by Frederick William Faber

- Genre: Hymn
- Written: 1849
- Text: Frederick William Faber
- Based on: Hebrews 11:6
- Meter: 8.8.8.8.8.8
- Melody: Sawston
- Published: 1849 by James Burns in Jesus and Mary

"Faith of our Fathers" is a Catholic hymn, written in 1849 by Frederick William Faber in memory of the Catholic Martyrs from the time of the establishment of the Church of England by Henry VIII and Elizabeth. Faber wrote two versions of the hymn: one with seven stanzas for Ireland, and another with four for England. The Irish version was sung at hurling matches until the 1960s.

In England, Scotland, Wales, and Ireland, it is usually sung to the traditional tune Sawston; in the United States, the tune St Catherine by Henri Hemy (the same tune used by the baptismal hymn "O Jesus Christ Our Lord Most Dear") is more commonly used.

== Lyrics ==
English Version

Faith of our Fathers! living still In spite of dungeon, fire, and sword: Oh, how our hearts beat high with joy Whene'er we hear that glorious word.

Refrain Faith of our Fathers! Holy Faith! We will be true to thee till death. We will be true to thee till death.

Our Fathers, chained in prisons dark, Were still in heart and conscience free: How sweet would be their children's fate, If they, like them, could die for thee!

Faith of our Fathers! Mary's prayers Shall win our country back to thee: And through the truth that comes from God England shall then indeed be free.

Faith of our Fathers! we will love Both friend and foe in all our strife: And preach thee too, as love knows how By kindly words and virtuous life:

Irish Version

Faith of our Fathers! living still In spite of dungeon, fire, and sword: Oh, Ireland's hearts beat high with joy Whene'er they hear that glorious word.

Faith of our Fathers! Holy Faith! We will be true to thee till death. We will be true to thee till death.

Our Fathers, chained in prisons dark, Were still in heart and conscience free: How sweet would be their children's fate, If they, like them, could die for thee!

Faith of our Fathers! Mary's prayers Shall keep our country fast to thee: And through the truth that comes from God O we shall prosper and be free.

Faith of our Fathers! we must love Both friend and foe in all our strife; And preach thee too, as love knows how By kindly words and virtuous life:

Faith of our Fathers! guile and force To do thee bitter wrong unite; But Erin's Saints shall fight for us, And keep undimmed thy blessed light.

Faith of our Fathers! distant shores Their happy faith to Ireland owe; Then in our home O shall we not Break the dark plots against thee now?

Faith of our Fathers! days of old Within our hearts speak gallantly: For ages thou hast stood by us, Dear Faith! and now we'll stand by thee.

== Faith of our Mothers ==
There is a variant, called Faith of our Mothers, authored by Arthur B. Patten, United States Congregational Church clergyman.

The lyrics are as follows:

Faith of our mothers, living still In cradle song and bedtime prayer; In nursery lore and fireside love, Thy presence still pervades the air.

Faith of our mothers, living faith, We will be true to thee till death.

Faith of our mothers, loving faith, Fount of our childhood's trust and grace, Oh, may thy consecration prove Source of a finer, nobler race;

Faith of our mothers, loving faith, We will be true to thee till death.

Faith of our mothers, guiding faith, For youthful longing, youthful doubt, How blurred our vision, blind our way, Thy providential care without.

Faith of our mothers, guiding faith, We will be true to thee till death.

Faith of our mothers, Christian faith, In truth beyond our stumbling creeds, Still serve the home and save the Church, And breathe thy spirit through our deeds;

Faith of our mothers, Christian faith, We will be true to thee till death.

== Protestant adaptations ==
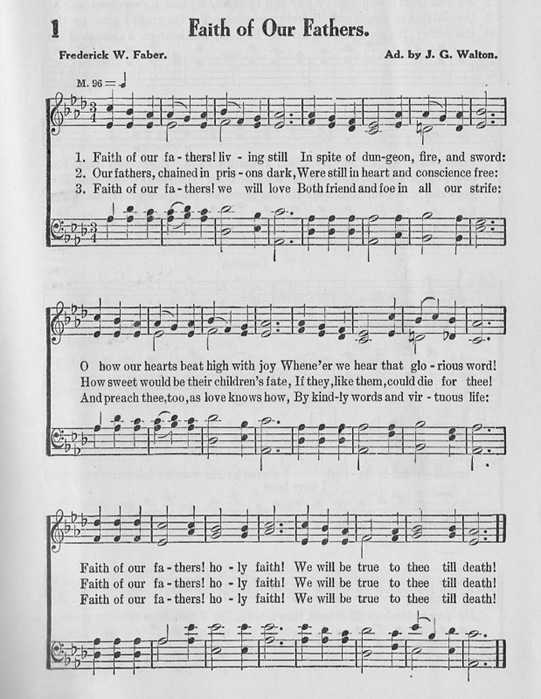
Faith of Our Fathers

Many Protestant churches and hymnals use an adapted version, with a third verse altered to remove Marian references:

Faith of our Fathers! we will strive
To win all nations unto thee,
And through the truth that comes from God,
Mankind shall then (be truly/indeed be) free.

Or they may use:

Faith of our Fathers! Faith and prayer
Shall win all nations unto thee,
And through the truth that comes from God,
Mankind shall then be truly free.

The final line of this verse has also been adapted as: "We all shall then be truly free."

In Korean Protestant churches, the third verse is simply omitted.
