= Frederick William Faber =

English priest, hymnwriter, and theologian (1814–1863)

The Reverend Father Frederick William Faber Cong. Orat.
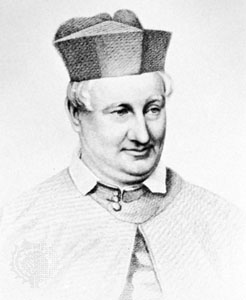
- Faber in an engraving by Joseph Brown
- Born: 28 June 1814; Calverley, England
- Died: 26 September 1863 (aged 49); London, England
- Education: University College, Oxford
- Occupations: Cleric; theologian; hymnwriter
- Known for: Founding the London Oratory
- Notable work: "Faith of Our Fathers"

Ecclesiastical career
- Religion: Roman Catholic (Former Anglican)
- Church: Church of England (before 1845); Roman Catholic Church (from 1845)
- Ordained: 1837 (Anglican deacon); 1839 (Anglican priest); 1847 (Roman Catholic priest)
- Congregations: Church of St. Wilfrid, Staffordshire
- Offices held: Provost of the London Oratory (1850–1863)

Frederick William Faber Cong. Orat. (28 June 1814 – 26 September 1863) was a noted English hymnwriter and theologian, who converted from Anglicanism to Catholicism in 1845. He was ordained to the Catholic priesthood in 1847. His best-known work is the hymn "Faith of Our Fathers". He was a member of the Oratory of Saint Philip Neri.

== Early life ==
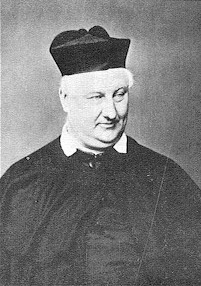
Faber c. 1850

Faber was born on 28 June 1814 at Calverley, then within the Parish of Calverley in the West Riding of Yorkshire, where his grandfather, Thomas Faber, was the vicar. His uncle, the theologian George Stanley Faber, had been a prolific author.

Faber attended grammar school at Bishop Auckland in County Durham for a short time, but a large portion of his boyhood was spent in Westmorland. He afterwards attended Harrow and Shrewsbury, followed by enrollment in 1832 at Balliol College at the University of Oxford. In 1834, he obtained a scholarship at University College, from which he graduated with second-class honours in Literae Humaniores in 1836. In the same year he won the Newdigate Prize for a poem on "The Knights of St John", which elicited special praise from John Keble. Among his college friends were Arthur Penrhyn Stanley and Roundell Palmer, 1st Earl of Selborne. After graduation, he was elected a fellow of the college.

Faber's family was of Huguenot descent, and Calvinist beliefs were strongly held by them. When Faber had come to Oxford, he was exposed to the Anglo-Catholic preaching of the Oxford Movement which was beginning to develop in the Church of England. One of its most prominent proponents was the popular preacher John Henry Newman, vicar of the University Church of St Mary the Virgin. Faber struggled with these divergent forms of Christian beliefs and life. In order to relieve his tension, he would take long vacations in the Lake District, where he would write poetry. There he was befriended by another poet, William Wordsworth. He finally abandoned the Calvinistic views of his youth and became an enthusiastic follower of Newman. In 1837 Faber met George Smythe, with whom he formed an intense bond. Several scholars have noted homoerotic tendencies in Faber's writings about this and other same-sex relationships.

== Anglican ministry ==
Faber was ordained in the Church of England in 1839, after which he spent time supporting himself as a tutor.

In 1843, Faber was offered the position of rector of Elton, then in Huntingdonshire but now in Cambridgeshire. The living was in the gift of his college, but given his High Church leanings, the village proved not to be ideal territory for him. His first act was to go to Rome to learn how best to carry out his pastoral charge. Faber introduced the Catholic practices of celebrating feast days, confession and the devotion of the Sacred Heart to the congregation. However, there was a strong Methodist presence in the parish and the Dissidents packed his church each Sunday in an attempt to challenge the High Church direction in which he was taking the congregation.

== Roman Catholic ministry ==
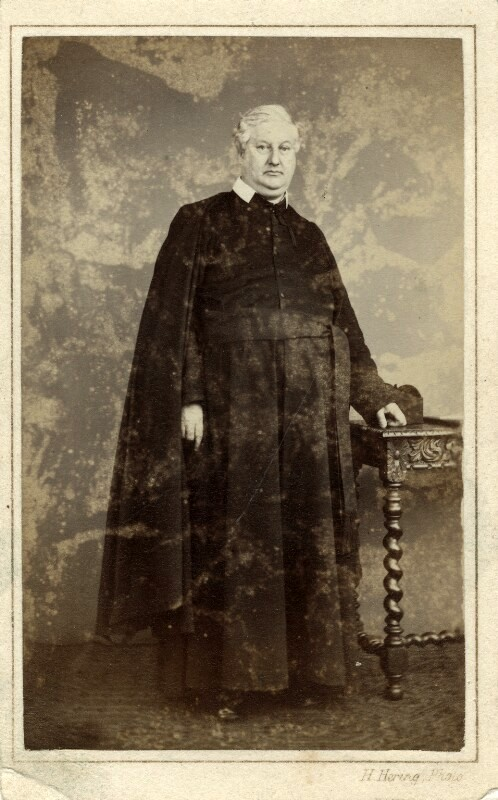
Faber c. 1860

Few people were surprised when, after a prolonged mental struggle, Faber left Elton to follow his hero Newman and join the Catholic Church, into which he was received in November 1845 by Bishop William Wareing of Northampton. He was accompanied by eleven men from the small community which had formed around him in Elton. They settled in Birmingham, where they informally organized themselves in a religious community, calling themselves the Brothers of the Will of God.

Faber and his small religious community were encouraged in their venture by the Earl of Shrewsbury, who gave them the use of Cotton Hall in Staffordshire. Within weeks they had begun construction on a new Church of St. Wilfrid, their patron saint, designed by the noted church architect, Pugin, as well as on a school for the local children. All of this was for a region which had no other Catholics at that point, other than the household of the earl. The exertions took their toll on Faber, who became so ill that he was not expected to live and was given the last rites of the church. He recovered, however, and was ordained a Catholic priest, celebrating his First Mass on 4 April 1847. In the course of his illness, Faber had developed a strong devotion to the Blessed Mother. Prompted by this devotion, he translated Louis de Montfort's classic work, True Devotion to Mary, into English.

=== The Oratory ===
Along with Newman, Faber felt drawn to the way of life of the Oratory of Saint Philip Neri, with its decentralized authority and greater freedom of life than in religious institutes.

The Earl of Shrewsbury, who had handsomely financed the construction of a new parish for the community, felt betrayed by such a quick departure. Additionally, the Wilfridians, as the Brothers were called, wished to wear a traditional religious habit, upsetting the old Catholic families who had survived centuries of persecution by keeping a low profile. Newman thus proposed that Faber's community settle somewhere other than Birmingham, and suggested London as the best option. Thus in 1849, a community of the Oratory was established in London in William IV Street.

On 11 October 1850, the feast of St. Wilfrid, the community in London was established as autonomous, and Faber was elected its first provost, an office he held until his death. He took ill again, however, almost immediately, and was ordered by his physicians to travel to a warmer climate. He attempted a trip to the Holy Land but had to turn back, and instead toured Malta and Italy. The community still lacked a permanent home, and in September 1852 a location was chosen at Brompton. The Oratorians proceeded with construction despite public protests at their presence.

== Last years ==
Faber had never enjoyed good health. He had suffered from illness for years, developing what was eventually diagnosed as Bright's disease, which was to prove fatal. In spite of his weak health, much work was crowded into those years. He published a number of theological works, and edited the Oratorian Lives of the Saints.

Faber died on 26 September 1863. His funeral was on 30 September and he was buried in the cemetery of St Mary's Sydenham (then in Kent), which was the Brompton Oratory's retreat house. In 1952 Faber's remains were re-interred in the Brompton Oratory London, when St Mary's was requisitioned by the London County Council. Elizabeth Bowden had given St Wilfrid's chapel at the Oratory, in memory of Faber, as in life he had a great devotion to St Wilfrid. He took the name of the saint when he entered the Oratory and chose St Wilfrid's feast for the formal foundation of the London house. His remains were laid in a vault in front of the altar and a marble slab and inscription cover the vault.

Faber was the great-uncle of Geoffrey Faber, co-founder of the publishing house "Faber and Gwyer" which later became "Faber and Faber", a major publisher of both literary and religious works.

Faber published hymnals titled 'Jesus and Mary' (1849) which contained considerable deep insights into Marian theology. As a Catholic writer, Faber countered Protestant ideas of 'automatic' salvation of the Christian by Christ's death (as evidenced by 'O Turn to Jesus, Mother turn') and the idea of Mary as being a mere character in the Christian story (as evidenced by 'Mother of Mercy, Day by Day').

== Hymns ==
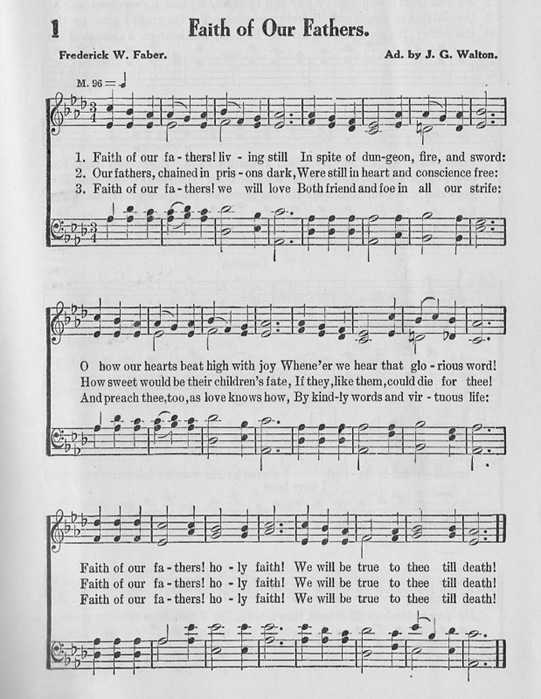
"Faith of Our Fathers", by Frederick William Faber

Among Faber's best-known hymns are:

- "Dear Angel, ever at my side, how loving must Thou be" A hymn to the Guardian Angel
- "Dear Guardian of Mary"
- "Faith of Our Fathers" This hymn originally had two versions, English and Irish, but is more commonly sung to the English with a slight alteration
- "Hail, Holy Joseph, Hail" One of the most popular hymns to Saint Joseph
- "Have mercy on us God most High" A hymn to the Holy Trinity. Most famously set to the same air as 'The Star of the County Down'
- "I was wandering and weary"
- "Jesus gentlest Saviour, God of Might and Power" A hymn for Holy Communion
- "Jesus is God, the glorious bands" (n. 298, The Church Hymn Book (1872)), written in 1862
- "Jesus my Lord, my God, my all!" A hymn for thanksgiving after Holy Communion
- "Like the Dawning of the Morning" Advent carol which describes the joy of Mary's expectation of the Infant Jesus
- "Mother of Mercy, Day by Day" (1849) A Marian hymn on the importance of Marian devotion
- "My God, how wonderful thou art" (1849) A hymn to the Eternal Father
- "O Blessed Saint Joseph"
- "O Jesus, Jesus, dearest Lord" (1848)
- "O Mother I could weep for Mirth! Joy fills my heart so fast" A hymn to Mary Immaculate
- "O paradise! O paradise" (1849)
- "O Purest of Creatures, Sweet Mother, Sweet Maid" A hymn to Mary, Star of the Sea. Translated into the Scottish Gaelic language, where it is sung to the same melody, by iconic poet Fr. Allan MacDonald (1859-1905) of Eriskay.
- "Oh, come and mourn with me awhile"(1849) A Passiontide hymn with emphasis on Mary
- "O turn to Jesus, Mother turn" A hymn calling on Mary for the aid of the Holy Souls in Purgatory
- "Oh, gift of gifts" (1848)
- "Sweet Saviour, bless us ere we go"
- "There's a Wideness in God's Mercy" (also known as "Souls of men, why will ye scatter?")
- "The Greatness of God"
- "The Will of God/God's Holy Will"

Faber was a supporter of congregational singing and wrote his hymns in an age when the English, in general, were slowly moving back to congregational singing after the strictness of low-church Anglicanism. So Faber, as a Catholic, expanded the church's hymns that were suitable for congregational singing and encouraged the practice.

We must remember that if all the manifestly good men were on one side and all the manifestly bad men on the other, there would be no danger of anyone, least of all the elect, being deceived by lying wonders. It is the good men, good once, we must hope good still, who are to do the work of Anti-Christ and so sadly to crucify the Lord afresh…. Bear in mind this feature of the last days, that this deceitfulness arises from good men being on the wrong side.

— Fr Frederick Faber, Devotion to the Church,p.27

== Works ==
In addition to many pamphlets and translations, Faber published the following works:

- The Cherwell Water-Lily and Other Poems (1840)
- Sights and Thoughts in Foreign Churches and among Foreign People (1842)
- Sir Lancelot: A Legend of the Middle Ages (book-length poem, 1842; revised edition, 1857)
- The Styrian Lake and Other Poems (1842)
- The Rosary and Other Poems (1845)
- An Essay on Beatification, Canonization, and the Congregation of Rites (1848)
- All for Jesus, or The Easy Ways of Divine Love (1853)
- Growth in Holiness, or The Progress of the Spiritual Life (1854)
- The Blessed Sacrament, or The Works and Ways of God (1855)
- Poems (1856)
- The Creator and the Creature, or The Wonders of Divine Love (1857)
- The Foot of the Cross, or The Sorrows of Mary (1858)
- Spiritual Conferences (1859)
- The Precious Blood, or The Price of Our Salvation (1860)
- Bethlehem (1860)
- Devotion to the Church
- Notes on Doctrinal and Spiritual Subjects (2 volumes, 1866)
