= Putney Town Rowing Club =

Rowing club in Kew, London, England

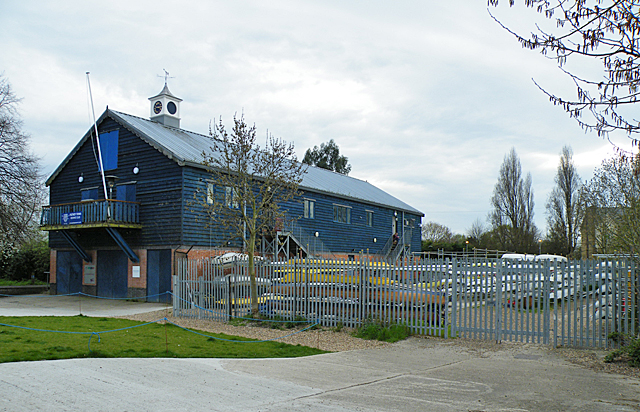

- Location: Townmead Road, Kew, London, England
- Coordinates: 51°28′27.71″N 0°16′24.88″W
- Home water: Tideway
- Founded: 1922
- Affiliations: British Rowing
- Website: www.putneytownrc.co.uk

Notable members
- Charlotte Taylor; Joanne Turvey

Putney Town Rowing Club (PTRC) is a rowing club on the Tideway, the tidal reach of the River Thames in England. Its official British Rowing registered colours are navy and white.

== History ==
The club was founded at the Half Moon Hotel, Putney in 1922 where it decided to base itself underneath The Duke's Head pub in Putney.

Since 1986 PTRC has occupied a boathouse in Kew. This allowed the club to expand, but its one-storey building was burnt down in 1992 by arson. The current boathouse was purpose-built in 1995 to create a large hall, bar, meeting room, changing areas and racking for a large number of boats, inside and outside.

On 26 October 2005, Putney Town had celebrated 10 years of the new boathouse with "Phoenix Party", where the entire fleet was taken out and rowed past the clubhouse, in front of a number of old members and local dignitaries.

== Equipment and facilities ==
The club house is at Townmead Road, Kew, just upstream of Chiswick Bridge on the southern (Surrey) bank of the river. The ground floor consists of a boatshed and a weight lifting area. The first floor has a large gym, bar, kitchen and changing rooms.

There are launches for coaching crews, a fully equipped weights area and Concept 2 ergometers. The large hall also allows the running of circuit training sessions, stretching and fitness classes as desired.

== Members ==
The club is for members only, but anyone may join under the following categories: Senior, Junior, Cox, Veteran or Land (Non Rowing). Members compete at a number of events, from local tideway regattas and head races, multi-lane national races and including Henley Royal Regatta (HRR), Henley Women's Regatta, the Vets Head of the River Race and a number of other local and national regattas.

The club has links with local schools such as Shene School and Christ's School with the ARA's 'Project Oarsome' initiative. The London Oratory School have also used the Putney Town boathouse in the past.

== Results ==
Non-local regatta accolades include that in 2007, 2008, 2009, 2010 and 2012 the club's men's eight qualified for the Thames Challenge Cup for men's eights at Henley Royal Regatta, on each occasion knocked out of the heavily competed tournament on the first full day of racing. The qualification for the event in 2007 was the first time the club qualified into the event for 40 years. The Wyfold Challenge Cup saw the (coxless) four also qualify in 2010.

Multi-lane (i.e. 6-8 lane) rowing has expanded. The first such win for a club crew was at Wallingford Regatta annually held at Eton-Dorney, in the Senior 3 Coxed Four, in 2008. The men's squad have competed in a number of events, including the Head of the Charles in Boston, MA and annually at all the major Tideway heads.

The women's senior squad has excelled at nationally attended eights races, at Henley Women's Regatta in 2008, the intermediate eight reached the semi-final of the Invesco Perpetual Trophy. See below for the 2014 pennant and medals won at the women's eights head of the river race.

At other national competitions:

- At the Head of the River Race 2012, the four eights entered finished 221st and 243rd, 379th and 399th (the last boat being novice) out of 404 timed crews. The race was called off in 2013 and 2014.
- In the Women's Eights Head of the River Race, 2014, the top eight won the IM1 pennant and medals in a composite boat with Molesey BC. The four eights entered finished 7th, 147th and 192nd and 234th out of 240 timed crews.
- At the Head of the River Race 2009, fewer eights entered, as the club was smaller, finishing 189th and 334th

== Honours ==
=== British champions ===
Year	Winning crew/s
2002	Men L2x composite
2003	Men L2x composite

== See also ==
- Rowing on the River Thames

== Sources ==
- British Rowing Almanack (all years)
