= Russell Taylor (architect) =

British architect

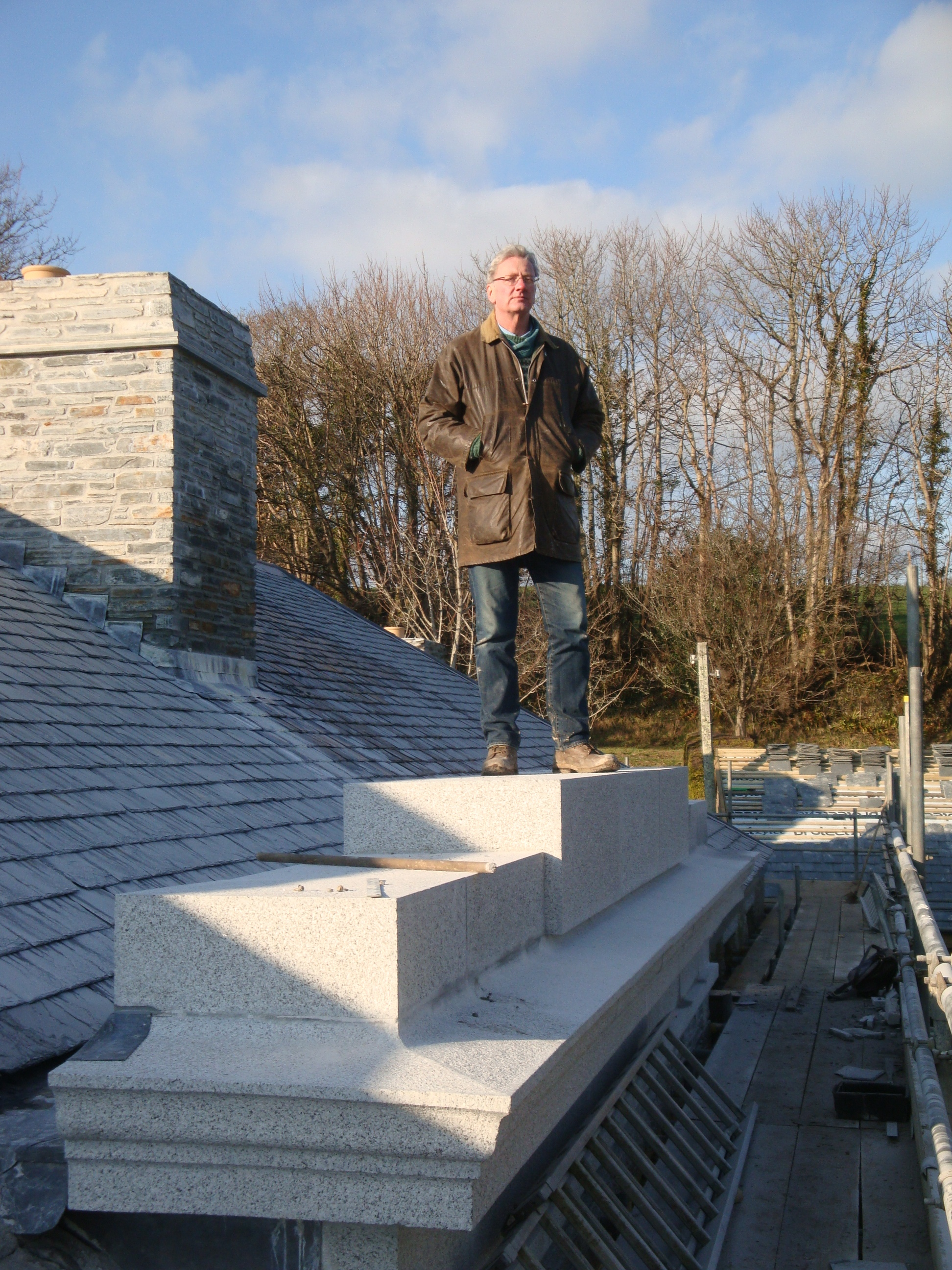
Russell Taylor, Newham Farm

Russell Taylor is a British architect who has designed and worked on a variety of building types, designing in the style known as New Classical Architecture, which follows the Classical tradition. He formed Russell Taylor Architects in 2005 and has offices in London and Cornwall.

== Introduction ==
=== Personal ===
Russell Taylor was born and grew up in Ipswich in Suffolk. He studied architecture at Kingston Polytechnic and later conservation at the Architectural Association in London.

He is married with three daughters and a son and lives in London and Cornwall.

He shares a birthday with Sir Christopher Wren: 20 October.

=== Career ===
Russell Taylor worked with the Classicists Robert Chitham at Chapman Taylor Partners, and, for a short period with John Simpson before joining the traditionalist practice Carden & Godfrey where he was made a partner. In 2005 he founded Russell Taylor Architects a practice with offices in London and Cornwall.

Examples of his work include:

- Crosby Hall in Chelsea
- The 11 September Memorial in Grosvenor Square
- The Newman and St Joseph Chapels in The London Brompton Oratory
- Newham, Trewane and Wetherham, Cornish countryhouses.
- London townhouses for private clients.
- Blen Hime Castle

He is:

- A trustee of the Georgian Group
- A Brother of the Art Workers' Guild
- A Liveryman of the Worshipful Company of Masons
- An active member of INTBAU
- A teacher at the European Summer School in Classical Architecture.

== Projects ==
2016-2018 The Royal Society of Musicians, Fitzroy Square, London

2015-2016 Ely Place Holborn, London refurbishment and alteration as barristers' chambers. Award: The Georgian Group

2015-2019 Villa, Bangkok, Thailand. A large stone Classical villa. (A project originally designed by Quinlan and Francis Terry.)

2012-2015 Trewane, St Kew, Cornwall. Alterations and extension in matching style to an important Listed 17th century country house.

2011-2013 Wetherham, St Tudy, Cornwall. Refurbishment and new interiors for an 18th century house with Art Deco interiors. Award: Cornish Buildings Group.

2010 The Newman Chapel: A new Chapel in the London Brompton Oratory with altar and reredos in scagliola.

2009 – present St John's Wood Barracks, London: designs for the redevelopment of the area. New housing in a Classical style. Consultant to the principal architects, John McAslan and partners.

2008–2011 Newham Farm, Cornwall: A new country house and extensive alterations to a range of buildings all in the Cornish Classical vernacular style.

2007–2010 The Narthex: A visitor centre for the Cathedral of St John the Baptist in Norwich (St John the Baptist Cathedral, Norwich) incorporating hall, shop, Café, bar, etc. and forming the new main entrance into the Cathedral.

2008–2010 Odsey House, Cambridgeshire: Extensive repairs and alterations to a Grade I listed country house built in 1720.

2007–2009 Fitzroy Square: Conservation and re-instatement of lost features on a Grade I listed Adam house.

2006–2008 Arundel Castle: A new garden in 17th century style, designed by Isabel and Julian Bannerman.

2004 – 2005 St Joseph's Chapel, The London Brompton Oratory. A new large baldacchino and reredos in a side chapel in marble, stone and scagliola.

2003 – present Cathedral of St John the Baptist, Norwich: Major re-ordering works including a new high altar, cathedra, etc.; a columbarium; fire protection works; a new visitor centre; and new sustainable heating.

2002–2003 Grosvenor Square: 11 September Memorial Garden. A Classical pavilion and garden structure in green oak within an oval garden.

1998–2002 The Jerwood Medical Education Centre, Royal College of Physicians, Regent's Park.

1994–1995 Windsor Castle: Feasibility designs for new interiors to the State and Octagonal Dining Rooms.

1993 – present Arundel Castle, West Sussex: A series of works including new gardens, interiors, lighting and Victorian Gothic style fittings.

1992–1997 Crosby Hall, Chelsea: A new English Renaissance style house covering a ½ acre and including the Great Hall of 1466.

1992–1995 Brasenose College, Oxford: Refurbishment, repair and extension works, and the Porters' Lodge.

1991 – present The London Brompton Oratory: Repairs and redecoration and completion of unfinished elements.

1991 21 Wadham Gardens, NW3: A large, new Arts and Crafts style house.

1989 Da Costa House, Highgate: A new office building in 18th century Classical style.

=== Articles by Russell Taylor ===
- 'Revealing Masons Mysteries', Architects' Journal 26/09/89
- 'Stone Cleaning', Building Conservation Directory 1994
- 'Chimneys & Flues', Building Conservation Directory 1999
- 'St Joseph's Chapel', The Oratory Magazine March 2006
- 'Stone Cantilevered Staircases', Building Conservation Directory 2006
- 'The Use of Classicism', Listed Heritage Issue 50 2007
- The Oratory Dome - SPAB Magazine August 2018
- Solomonic Columns in England The Georgian Group Journal 2016
- 13 Ely Place, An Exemplar of Georgian Group Spatial Ordering The Georgian 2017
- Putting Back the Style - Listed Heritage Issue 122 2019
