= 37–41 Lower Richmond Road =

Listed houses in Putney, London

Coordinates: 51.4670309°N 0.2171451°W

37–41 Lower Richmond Road are Grade II listed private houses in Putney, in the London Borough of Wandsworth.

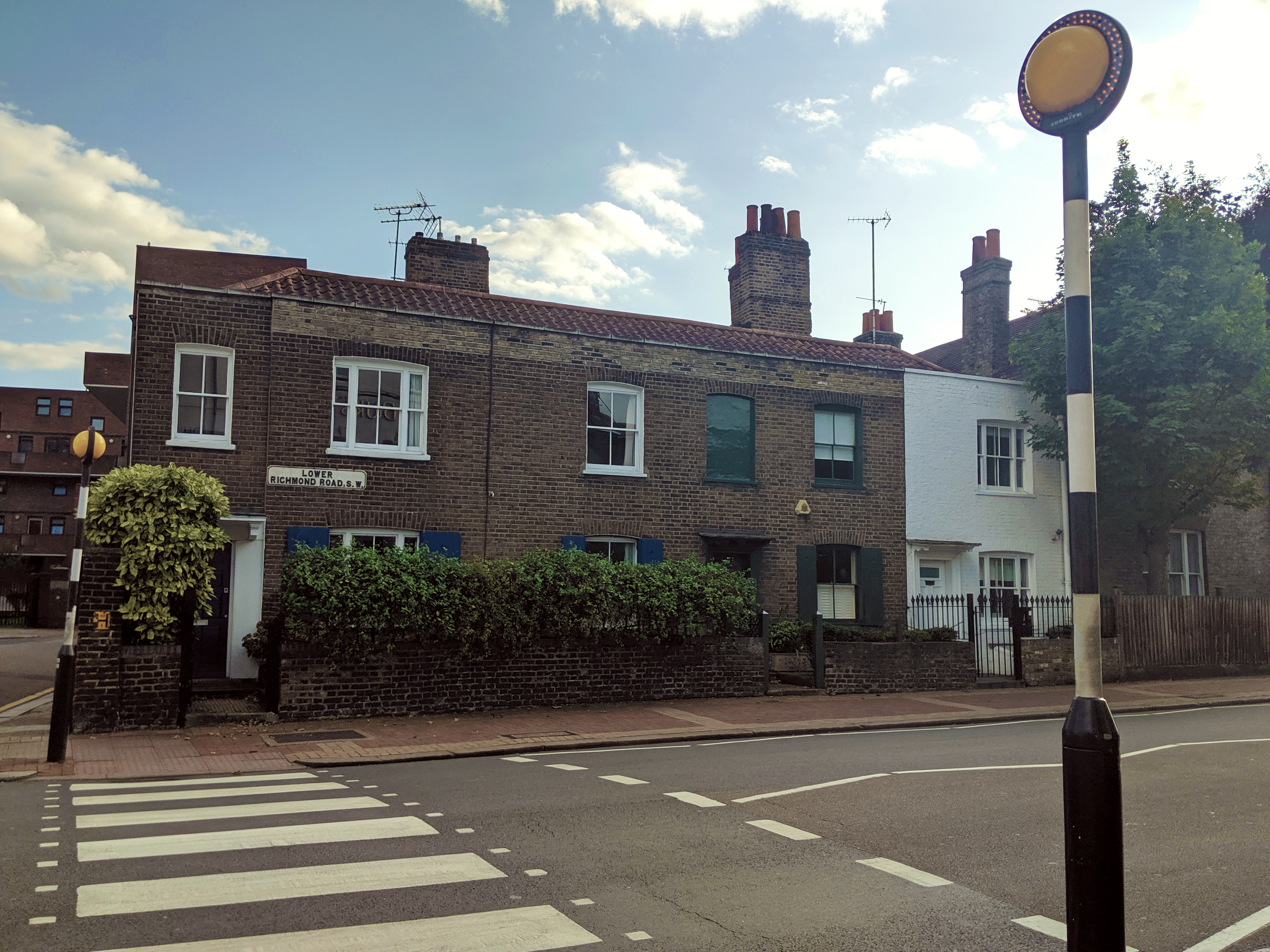
37, 39 and 41 Lower Richmond Road

The buildings are located on the south side of the Lower Richmond road, on the corner with Thames Place and opposite the Duke's Head pub.

They are two-storey workers cottages dating from the early 19th century. Number 37 is divided into flats and is one window wide plus the entrance and window above. Number 39 is a terraced house that is three windows wide, with a bricked up window above the entrance. Number 41 is a semi-detached house, one window wide with the entrance to the left.
