= Stephen M. Collins =

Canadian gastroenterologist

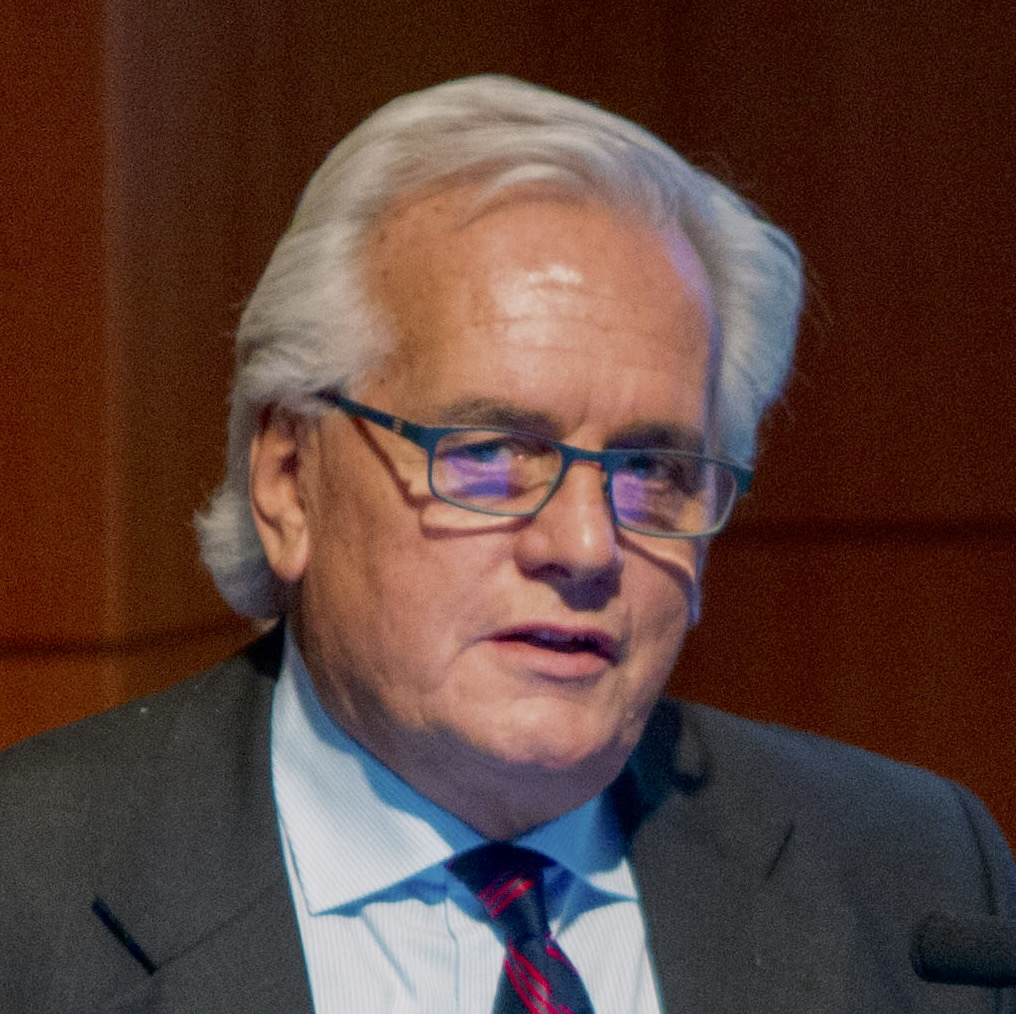
- Born: United Kingdom
- Education: Imperial College London; Westminster Hospital Medical School; University of London; University of Leicester; McMaster University
- Known for: Microbiota–gut–brain axis research
- Awards: Fellow of the Royal Society of Canada; Queen Elizabeth II Diamond Jubilee Medal; Honorary Fellow, Royal College of Physicians of Ireland
- Honors: Distinguished University Professor, McMaster University
- Scientific career
- Fields: Gastroenterology
- Workplaces: McMaster University

Stephen M. Collins FRCPC, FRSC is a Canadian physician–scientist and gastroenterologist. He is a professor at McMaster University in Hamilton, Ontario, known for his research on the microbiota–gut–brain axis and leadership in digestive health research.

== Early life and education ==
Collins was born in the United Kingdom and raised in London. He attended the London Oratory Grammar School before studying at Imperial College London and Westminster Hospital Medical School. He completed postgraduate medical training at the Universities of London and Leicester. Collins later subspecialized in gastroenterology at McMaster University in Canada and undertook research training at the Digestive Diseases Branch of the National Institutes of Health in Bethesda, United States.

== Career ==
Collins joined the faculty at McMaster University in 1981. In 1983, he founded and directed the Intestinal Diseases Research Unit, a role he held until 1993. He was among the first researchers in Canada to investigate the human microbiome, establishing the country’s first axenic–gnotobiotic (germ-free) facility in 2004.

In 2008, he established the Farncombe Family Digestive Health Research Institute, dedicated to the study of microbiota–host interactions in health and disease.

== Positions held at McMaster University ==
- Director, Intestinal Diseases Research Unit (1983–1993)
- Head, Division of Gastroenterology (1992–2006)
- Associate Dean for Research, Faculty of Health Sciences (2006–2019)
- Director, Farncombe Family Digestive Health Research Institute (2014–2024)

== Research ==
Collins investigated the microbiota–gut–brain axis in chronic intestinal diseases, with a focus on irritable bowel syndrome (IBS), inflammatory bowel disease (IBD), and psychiatric comorbidity.

== Awards and honours ==
- Distinguished University Professor, McMaster University
- President, Canadian Association of Gastroenterology
- Queen Elizabeth II Diamond Jubilee Medal (2012)
- Fellow of the Royal Society of Canada
- Honorary Fellow, Royal College of Physicians of Ireland
