= Duke's Head, Putney =

Listed pub in London, England

Duke's Head
- The pub in 2024

General information
- Type: Public house
- Location: 8 Lower Richmond Road, Putney, London, England
- Coordinates: 51°28′02″N 0°13′02″W
- Completed: 1864; 162 years ago
- Renovated: c. 1894 (extended and refurbished); 2006 (refurbished)
- Owner: Young's

Design and construction
- Designations

Listed Building – Grade II
- Official name: The Duke's Head
- Designated: 21 October 2005
- Reference no.: 1391758

Website
- dukesheadputney.com

The Duke's Head is a Grade II listed public house on Lower Richmond Road in Putney, London, England, situated on the River Thames near the start of the University Boat Race course. A pub is thought to have occupied the site since 1774, while the present building dates from 1864 and retains significant fittings from an 1894 refurbishment. It is included on the Campaign for Real Ale's National Inventory of Historic Pub Interiors, where its interior is recognised as being of "outstanding national historic importance".

== History ==
A public house is thought to have been on the site from 1774, and the current pub building dates from 1864 with fittings from 1894; its basement was used by Putney Town Rowing Club for the storage of boats.

On 21 October 2005, the Duke's Head was designated a Grade II listed building. The pub is regarded by the Campaign for Real Ale (CAMRA) as having an interior of "outstanding national historic importance" and is rated three stars on its National Inventory of Historic Pub Interiors.

The pub stands between Putney Embankment and Lower Richmond Road, at the corner with Thames Place, opposite 37–41 Lower Richmond Road. It overlooks the start of the University Boat Race course and is close to the Boat Race start stone.

Following a refurbishment, the pub reopened in 2006 as Young's first smoke-free venue and remains owned and operated by the company.

== Architecture ==
=== Exterior ===
The building is finished in stucco, with horizontal grooving to the ground floor. It occupies a prominent corner position.

The main elevation rises to three storeys, with three window bays facing the street and seven along the side return. A single-storey extension adjoins the Grade II-listed Winchester House. Upper floors have sash windows with decorative surrounds and a continuous band beneath the windows. At ground-floor level are etched-glass windows bearing the words "Brandies" and "Wines and Spirits". An entrance porch projects slightly from the frontage and contains a mosaic floor displaying the name "The Dukes Head". A former entrance on the corner has been blocked.

Along the side elevation, the second floor contains casement windows beneath a dentilled eaves cornice. Large first-floor windows are topped by shallow arched lights and decorative detailing, with recessed panels below. At ground level are further etched and glazed windows, together with a narrow entrance and a recessed two-bay entrance to the saloon bar, lined with coloured mosaic flooring and blue and brown glazed tiles.

The river-facing side continues the same window arrangement, including windows set around a curved corner. A basement entrance is protected by tidal flood gates, with a plaque for Putney Rowing Club above. Four substantial chimney stacks rise above the roofline.

=== Interior ===
The interior in 2013

The interior is notable for its survival of extensive late-Victorian woodwork and etched glass, probably dating from alterations of 1894. The ground floor retains its historic three-part arrangement, with a public bar, saloon bar and lounge separated by timber-and-glass screens with carved details. A large central servery with an island bar-back survives, together with features including a mirrored dumbwaiter, a glazed view into the cellar stairwell and fittings associated with the former beer-pump system.

Decorative etched and cut glass is used throughout screens, doors and passageways, while the main entrance retains mosaic and tiled finishes. Original features also include fireplaces in the saloon bar and lounge, decorative cornices and friezes, and etched-glass panels marked "Club Room", reflecting the former use of the upper floor. Although some alterations have taken place, the interior largely preserves its late-19th-century character.

The first floor, now used for staff facilities and toilets, formerly served as a club room and retains a large marble fireplace. The basement contains a former skittles alley and storage areas once used by Putney Rowing Club for boat storage between 1929 and 1986.

== See also ==
- List of pubs in London
