= HegartyMaths =

UK educational website

- Website type: Maths online tutoring
- Available in: English
- Dissolved: Since October 2023
- Successor: Sparx Learning (Sparx Maths)
- Area served: United Kingdom
- Owner: Colin Hegarty
- Industry: Education
- Services: Subscription
- Website: hegartymaths.com
- Advertising: Yes
- Commercial: Yes
- Registration: Required with credentials given by school
- Launched: 12 July 2013
- Current status: Closed

HegartyMaths was an educational subscription tool used by schools in the United Kingdom. It was sometimes used as a replacement for general mathematics homework tasks. Its creator, Colin Hegarty, was the UK Teacher of the Year in 2015 and shortlisted for the Varkey Foundation's Global Teacher Prize in 2016.

== Usage ==
HegartyMaths covered a variety of topics and had 943 tasks to complete. A task included an educational video with an explanation and examples on the topic. Afterwards, there was a quiz to complete, containing topic specific questions. The site was regularly updated and more topics were added to keep up with the General Certificate of Secondary Education (GCSE) mathematics curriculum. Students could complete tasks by themselves, or teachers could assign these tasks to students to complete as homework or for revision purposes and then track the student's progress.

== History ==
HegartyMaths was created by co-founders and teachers Colin Hegarty and Brian Arnold. In 2011 they started to make maths videos on YouTube to support their own classes with maths homework and revision. Since the videos were freely available on YouTube, students from all over the country and the world started using the videos too. In 2012 Colin won £15,000 of funding from a education charity called SHINE, through its Let Teachers SHINE competition, to make a website to host the videos and make more content. The original website, launched on 12 July 2013, was called mathswebsite.com. It was built to contain free maths videos to assist students in revision and is still accessible today.

In February 2016, a new site was launched, HegartyMaths.com. In 2019, Colin Hegarty sold HegartyMaths to Sparx Learning (a company selling GCSE revision packages), then Sparx Maths, for an undisclosed sum. Colin became part of the leadership team for Sparx and continued to lead development on HegartyMaths.

HegartyMaths has since been shut down and now redirects to Sparx Maths. The Sparx Learning website claims this happened in 2022, after "incorporating its best features and learnings into Sparx Maths". At the beginning of 2023 Colin was announced as the new CEO of Sparx Learning.
