= British military intelligence systems in Northern Ireland =

The British Military is alleged by author Tony Geraghty to have exploited a number of information sources during the Troubles in Northern Ireland. Geraghty describes these in his book, The Irish War, basing his description on an extract from an unspecified, classified document passed to him by an unspecified informant, later identified as a former Army officer, Nigel Wylde.

Geraghty said that these systems were extensively used by both British Military Intelligence and Police.

== Sourcing ==
The Ministry of Defence Police accused Geraghty of using an extract from a classified document passed to him by Wylde as his source. Following publication of The Irish War, Geraghty and Wylde were investigated by the Ministry of Defence Police and charged with offences under the Official Secrets Act 1989. The case against both was later dropped by the MoD.

== Military context ==
By 1994 the British military, intelligence and police apparatus in Northern Ireland had over thirty-seven separate intelligence gathering computer systems operating. Their focus was detection before, during and after paramilitary activity, with a particular focus on the activities of the Provisional Irish Republican Army (PIRA).

== System claims ==
=== Vehicle tracking ===
Geraghty said that a system called Op Vengeful was used to identify vehicles associated with a subject of interest and linked to the Driver and Vehicle Licensing Agency of Northern Ireland. Vehicle Registration Numbers (VRN) associated with persons of interest were recorded on a card index system maintained by Intelligence Sections throughout Northern Ireland and those operating Vehicle Check Points would be informed as to what checks should be conducted on the driver, occupants and vehicle.

"Stop Three" was the code word used to identify a vehicle of particular interest and scrutiny. Intelligence operators had a direct line to the DVLA at Coleraine who would give details as requested. The system predated computers – hence the need to obtain information by landline from the DVLA and was in use from 1971 until 1980 when local databases replaced the phone and paper system.

=== Subject of interest information collation ===
Geraghty said that a system called Crucible was used to consolidate items of information about individuals including personal details, imagery, mapping, movements and activities. He alleges that this system was later replaced by a modernised system called Caister with some 350 terminals throughout the province operating at the secret level.

=== Automated vehicle tracking ===
Geraghty said that in 1997 the Vengeful system was connected to a camera network called Glutton that would automatically track the movements of vehicles identified as being related to subjects of interest. Geraghty claims that there were eighty overt and twenty covert camera locations in Northern Ireland and further deployment of camera equipment in Britain.

In 1997 an analysis system called Effigy was integrated with Vengeful under a project titled Mannequin allowing more detailed analysis of the vehicle movement data.
