= John McIntosh (teacher) =

British Professor (born 1946)

Professor John McIntosh CBE FRSA
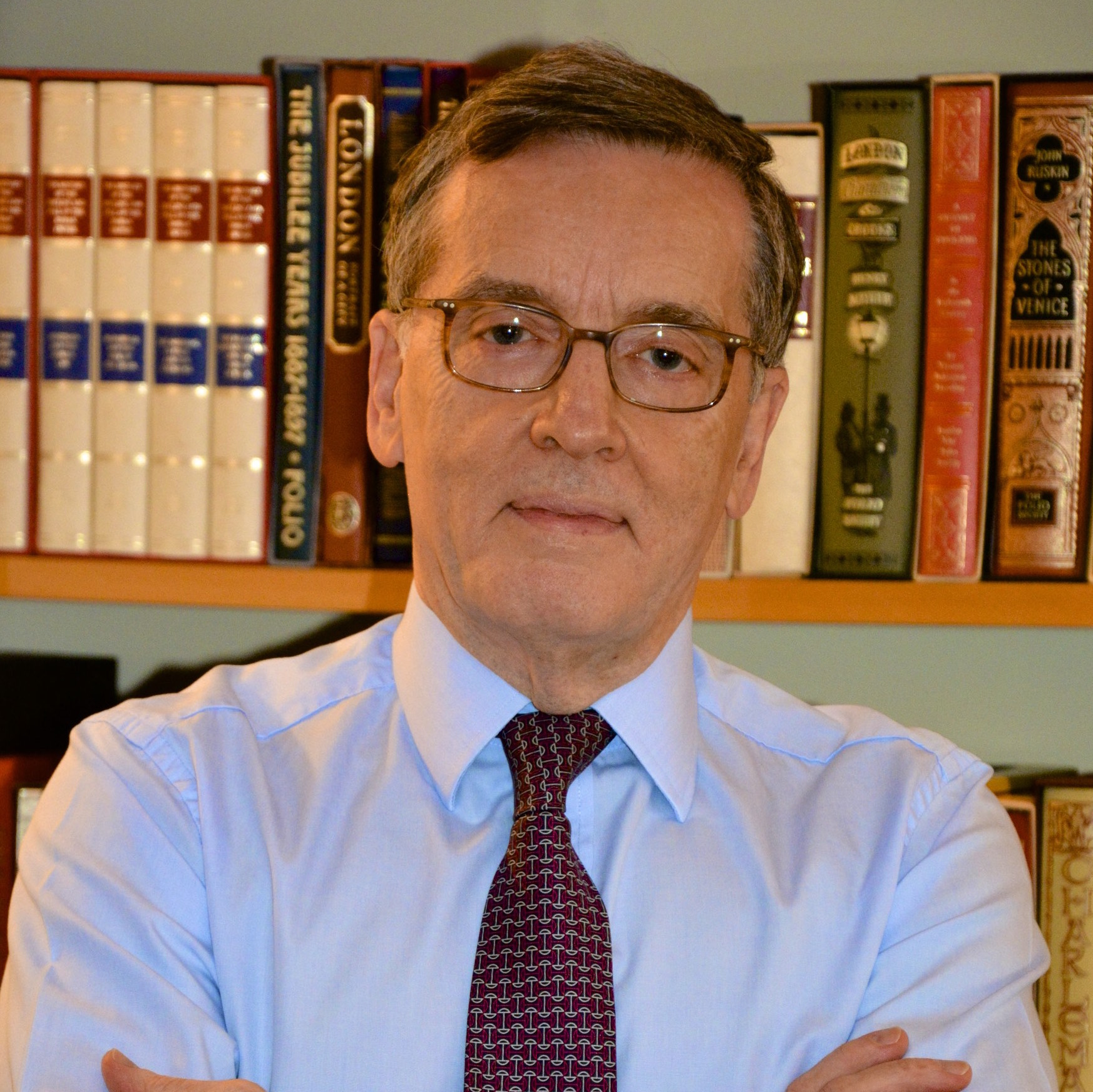
- Born: John Charles McIntosh; 6 February 1946 (age 80); London, England
- Citizenship: British
- Education: University of Sussex
- Occupation: Educator
- Known for: Headmaster of The London Oratory School

John Charles McIntosh, CBE, FRSA (born 6 February 1946) is a British educationalist who was Headmaster of The London Oratory School for 29 years, until his retirement on 31 December 2006.

He was educated at Ebury School, Shoreditch College and Sussex University. He joined the London Oratory School as an Assistant Master for Mathematics at the age of 21 in 1967, was promoted to Deputy Headmaster in 1971 and was appointed Headmaster in 1977.

== Career ==
A report by the Sutton Trust on university admissions in 2006 reported that of the 100 schools with the highest admission rates to Oxford and Cambridge, 80 were independent schools, 18 grammar schools and 2 comprehensive schools. One of the comprehensive schools was 99th; the other – The London Oratory – was 21st, comfortably ahead of many highly successful and very well known public schools. The table for state school entries to the 13 highest performing universities put the school at number 2, the first place going to a grammar school.

While he was headmaster of The London Oratory School, he established a specialist music course for boys from seven to eighteen, which included a liturgical choir which provided a rigorous choral education, equivalent to that otherwise only available in independent cathedral choir schools.

He was elected an additional member of the Headmasters Conference (HMC) in 1986.

Throughout his career, McIntosh has lobbied for greater autonomy for maintained schools. This was the theme of the paper he presented at the invitation of the then Prime Minister, Margaret Thatcher, at The State of Our Schools at an Education Seminar at Downing Street in 1986. He went on to chair a group which proposed what were to become grant maintained schools. In 1989 The London Oratory School was in the first tranche of schools to opt for grant maintained status.

He has frequently found himself at odds with the Catholic Bishops of England and Wales, most notably in 1989, when the Westminster Diocese tried to browbeat his governors and trustees into abandoning the sixth form. More recently he has been at odds with the Bishops over the issue of whether RE should be included in the English Baccalaureate: McIntosh believes that it should not.

He fought tenaciously to retain the right to interview applicants for places at the school, a fight which was vindicated by the High Court in 2004, when Mr Justice Rupert Jackson quashed an order made by the Schools Adjudicator ordering the School not to interview.

McIntosh was appointed to the think tank, the Centre for Policy Studies Education Group in 1979. Between 1988 and 1991, he served on the Education Advisory Council of the Institute of Economic Affairs. He served on the Health Education Council between 1985 and 1988, and on the National Curriculum Council between 1990 and 1993; and he was a member of the National Curriculum Review Advisory Group between 2011 and 2013.

He was an adviser on education to the Leader of Hammersmith & Fulham Council from 2006 until 2012. In 2007–08 he was a member of the Fulham Schools Commission, established to develop a detailed and coherent strategy for secondary provision in Fulham, the recommendations of which were accepted in full. In 2007–09 he was responsible for establishing a bilingual (English & French) primary education course involving a partnership between the local authority, the French government, Westminster Diocese and the governing body of a Catholic primary school; he now chairs the Bilingual Management Committee.

In 2005 he was appointed Dean and Education Advisor of The Academy of St. Cecilia, of which he is an honorary fellow. He was a member of the Abbot's Advisory Committee at Ampleforth College from 1997 until 2010. He has been a trustee/governor of the governing bodies of several schools in London, including St Philip's Preparatory School, where he was chairman of governors for six years, and the West London Free School. He is a director of the Hackney New School Trust, the honorary president of the West London Free School Trust and a trustee of the English Schools Orchestra and Choir. He served as Vice Chairman of Council at the University of Buckingham from 2015 to 2020. In 2020, he was appointed Chairman of Council of the Buckingham International School of Education.

He was Chairman of the Commission on Assessment Without Levels, which published its report in September 2015.

He has been a member of the Catholic Union of Great Britain since 1978. According to The Tablet, he is the 96th most influential lay Catholic in Britain.

== Honours ==
He was appointed Officer of the Order of the British Empire (OBE) in 1996 and Commander of the Order of the British Empire (CBE) in the 2013 New Year Honours for services to education.

He was made a Knight of Merit of the Sacred Military Constantinian Order of Saint George in 2012. In 2016 an honorary degree of Doctor of Letters was conferred on him by the University of Westminster. In April 2018 he was elected an honorary Professor of Professional Practice in Education at the University of Buckingham.

== Controversy ==
Under his headmastership, the London Oratory School was chosen for the education of the children of the Prime Minister, Tony Blair. In 1999, in a letter to 1000 boys at the school, he asked parents to contribute at least £30 a month to cover a £250,000 deficit in the school's budget that he blamed directly on government policy. This was an embarrassment to the government and led to widely reported criticism from Labour politicians and unions.
