= London Oratory =

Catholic community of priests

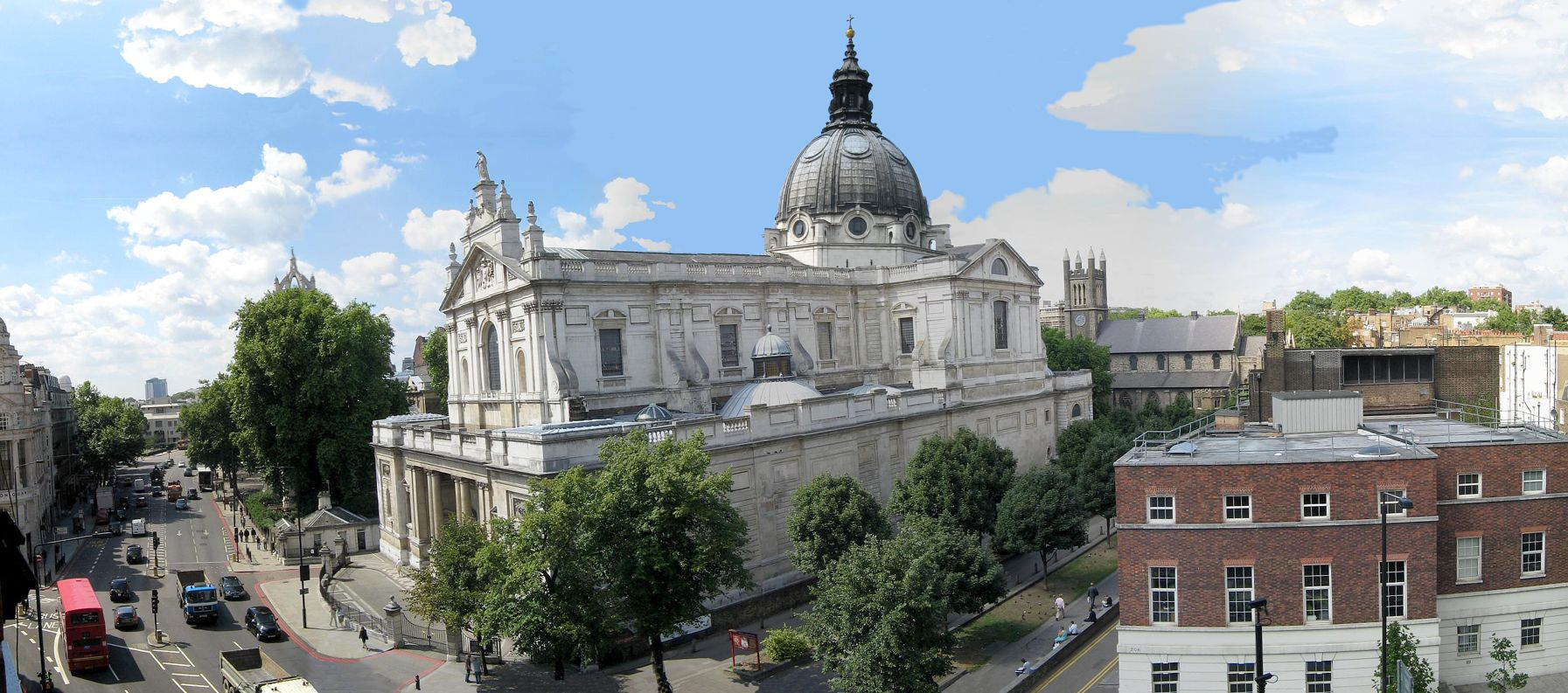
- The Church of the Immaculate Heart of Mary is home to the London Oratory
- Interactive map of London Oratory

Monastery information
- Other name: Brompton Oratory
- Order: Oratory of Saint Philip Neri
- Established: 1849
- Dedication: Immaculate Heart of Mary
- Diocese: Westminster
- Controlled churches: Brompton Oratory

People
- Founder: Frederick Faber
- Archbishop: Richard Moth
- Important associated figures: Julian Large CO (provost)

Site
- Coordinates: 51°29′50″N 0°10′12″W
- Website: bromptonoratory.co.uk

The London Oratory, officially the Congregation of the Oratory of St Philip Neri in London, is a Catholic community of priests living under the rule of life established by Philip Neri (1515–1595). It is located in the Oratory House next to the Church of the Immaculate Heart of Mary (Brompton Oratory) on Brompton Road in the Royal Borough of Kensington and Chelsea, London.

The Oratarians have four other oratories in the United Kingdom, the Birmingham Oratory, the Manchester Oratory, the Oxford Oratory and the York Oratory.

== Origins ==
The London Oratory was founded in 1849, the year after Cardinal John Henry Newman established the Birmingham Oratory, when Newman sent Frederick Faber and some companions, including Thomas Francis Knox, to start an oratory in London. The original premises (a former whisky store) were in King William Street (now William IV Street) near Charing Cross. In 1854 the community moved to its present Brompton Road site adjacent to the Victoria and Albert Museum. The site had previously been owned by Robert Pollard, who had set up a boys' boarding school there known as Blemell House. Newman was not initially enthusiastic with a location he considered what was then in the suburbs.

An attempt early in 1853 by the vicar of Holy Trinity, Brompton, to prevent the establishment of a Catholic community so close to his church was unsuccessful. An Oratory House was built in 1854, followed by a large temporary church. The house contained the congregation's chapel, known as the "Little Oratory", decorated in 1871 by John Hungerford Pollen, who, at that time, was connected with the nearby South Kensington Museum (now the V&A).

The church was replaced in 1884 by the present neo-Baroque building designed by Herbert Gribble. Until the opening of Westminster Cathedral in 1903, the London Oratory was the venue for all great Catholic occasions in London, including the funeral of Cardinal Manning in 1892.

Together with their Church of the Immaculate Heart of Mary, the community of the Oratorian Fathers is often popularly, though less accurately, referred to as the "Brompton Oratory".

The parish is part of the Roman Catholic metropolitan diocese of Westminster, at whose request it is run by the priests of the oratory. It is part of the Kensington and Chelsea deanery.

== Oratorian Fathers ==
The Oratorian Fathers are a congregation of secular priests living a community life, bound together not by vows but by the internal bond of charity and by the external bonds of a common life and rule, dominated by prayer and ministry to their city. There are several Masses offered each day and private Masses are available by arrangement as are weddings and funerals. Confessions are also heard daily and priests are always available for counsel and advice. The London Oratory, which is currently served by three choirs, is notable in particular for the solemn celebration of the Roman liturgy, especially in Latin, and for its preservation of the traditional place of music in the liturgy.

=== List of provosts ===
The Oratorian Fathers elect a provost from amongst their number to serve as superior for three-year terms. The following have served as provost of the London Oratory:

- 1849-1863: Fr Wilfrid Faber
- 1863-1865: Fr John Dalgairns
- 1865-1868: Fr Thomas Knox
- Over the next century, Provosts include: Frs William Gordon, Henry Bowden, Edward Keogh, Thomas Knox, Henry Cator and others
- 1969–1981: Fr Michael Scott Napier
- 1981-1987: Fr Charles Dilke
- 1991–1994: Fr Michael Scott Napier
- 1994–2012: Fr Ignatius Harrison
- 2012–present: Fr Julian Large

== In popular culture ==
The singer-songwriter Nick Cave wrote a lovesong called "Brompton Oratory", set outside and inside the London Oratory, which is included on the Nick Cave and the Bad Seeds' album The Boatman's Call.

== See also ==
- London Oratory School - school of the London Oratory
- London Oratory School Schola - children's choir of the London Oratory
