= List of oldest rowing clubs in the world =

This is a list of the oldest currently active rowing clubs in the world, restricted to independent or "open" clubs whose membership is not restricted to a particular school, college, or university. The list is ordered principally by the earliest documented foundation or predecessor date, with the nature of institutional continuity stated where the present club is the result of a merger, reorganisation, division, or change of name.

Organised rowing developed in Britain during the late 18th and early 19th centuries, initially alongside professional watermen's racing and subsequently as an organised amateur sport. Independent rowing clubs emerged alongside, and in some cases shortly after, school and university boat clubs. Several educational clubs are older than the independent clubs listed here — for example Westminster School Boat Club (1813) and the boat clubs of Brasenose and Jesus College, Oxford (1815) — but these are treated as a separate category.

Leander Club, generally dated to 1818, is conventionally regarded as the oldest surviving independent or non-academic rowing club. The precise circumstances of its foundation are uncertain, however, and surviving historical evidence places its establishment approximately in 1818–1819.

== Methodology ==
"Oldest" is ambiguous in the history of rowing clubs. Formal incorporation, the first recorded meeting, the first regatta, adoption of a constitution, and the formation of a recognisably continuous club did not necessarily occur in the same year. Early club records have also frequently been lost. For this reason, the table distinguishes between:

- Foundation — the earliest documented date generally associated with the present club or a recognised institutional predecessor;
- Continuity — whether the present club claims or can document continuous institutional descent from that predecessor;
- Merger or reorganisation — where the present club was created through the merger, division, or reorganisation of earlier clubs; and
- Uncertainty — where contemporary or archival evidence conflicts with the date subsequently adopted by the club.

Where a present club is demonstrably descended from an earlier club through a merger, division, or reorganisation, the earlier date is included but the nature of the succession is stated in the notes. A club which became extinct and was subsequently revived is not treated as continuously existing unless reliable sources establish institutional continuity. The list is not intended to establish an absolute worldwide ranking in cases where the documentary evidence is insufficient. Dates given as "c." or as a range indicate uncertainty in the surviving evidence.

The 'Blades' column shows the club's oar blade colours where a corresponding image already exists on Wikimedia Commons and is used on the club's own Wikipedia article. This is a British Rowing convention documenting the painted colour pattern on the tip of a club's oars, used to identify crews on the water; it is not consistently recorded for clubs outside the United Kingdom, and its absence for a club does not imply the club lacks its own colours, only that no linkable image has yet been catalogued on Commons.

=== Excluded and disputed clubs ===
==== Société des Régates du Havre ====
The Société des Régates du Havre in Le Havre, France, traces its origins to a group formed in 1838 and held its first rowing regatta in 1839. It is sometimes described as one of the earliest rowing organisations in continental Europe. Its present activities, however, are principally associated with sailing rather than rowing, and it is therefore excluded from a list restricted to currently active rowing clubs.

==== Schuylkill Navy clubs ====
Several Philadelphia clubs associated with the Schuylkill Navy have foundation dates earlier than some clubs in the main list. Bachelors Barge Club, for example, dates from 1853, while University Barge Club dates from 1854. These clubs require separate examination of their institutional continuity, because the date of a historic club's foundation does not necessarily establish uninterrupted existence of the present organisation. The Schuylkill Navy itself was founded in 1858 and is an association of rowing clubs rather than a rowing club in its own right.

==== Educational clubs ====
School, college, and university boat clubs are excluded throughout. This includes Westminster School Boat Club (1813) and the boat clubs of Oxford and Cambridge colleges, as well as Eton College Boat Club (1840). Their exclusion reflects the distinction between educational boat clubs and independent/open rowing clubs rather than an assertion that they are younger. Eton Excelsior Rowing Club, though sharing its historic riverbank with Eton College and originally leasing land from the school, is included in the main list because its own membership has never been restricted to the school.

==== Defunct clubs and revived organisations ====
A club that existed in the 19th century but subsequently became extinct is not included merely because a modern organisation later adopted the same or a similar name. Where a modern club is a documented successor to an earlier club through a merger, division, or reorganisation, the earlier date is included only where the institutional relationship is documented. Pennsylvania Barge Club and Detroit Boat Club, both included above, illustrate the intermediate case of a club whose present-day rowing activity is carried on through a later reactivation or a separately organised successor body rather than an unbroken corporate history; this is noted in each entry.

== Interpretation of the ranking ==
The ranking should not be interpreted as an exact chronological ordering in every case. In particular, the distinction between a club's 'earliest predecessor' and the 'continuous existence of the present organisation' can change the apparent order. Athlone Boat Club, Lancaster John O'Gaunt Rowing Club, York City Rowing Club, Poplar, Blackwall and District Rowing Club, Detroit Boat Club, Pennsylvania Barge Club, Eton Excelsior Rowing Club, Derby Rowing Club, Sudbury Rowing Club, and several other clubs have historical traditions or documentary evidence that require further reconciliation before their positions can be regarded as definitive. The strongest claims of uninterrupted institutional continuity are therefore distinguished from claims based principally on the earliest known predecessor.

== List ==
Rank	Club	Earliest foundation / predecessor	Country	Blades	Continuity and historical notes
1	Leander Club	1818/19	England	Leander Club blade: cerise	Generally regarded as the oldest surviving independent rowing club. The traditional foundation date is 1818, but contemporary evidence discussed by R. C. Lehmann places the foundation approximately in 1818–1819.
2	Eton Excelsior Rowing Club	1826 (c. 1821–1851)	England		The club's own history traces its origin to 2 January 1826, when ten men signed the club's Articles; other sources describe it as an intermittent club from as early as 1821, only formally established in 1851. Although its original boathouse stood on land leased from Eton College, the club has always been independent of, and is not affiliated with, the school's own Eton College Boat Club (founded 1840). Given the considerable spread of dates attached to its foundation, its position in this ranking should be treated with particular caution.
3	Loch Lomond Rowing Club	1827	Scotland		The club was established on the banks of Loch Lomond in 1827, and moved to its present clubhouse in the 1970s.
4	Athlone Boat Club	1835/37	Ireland		The club dates its foundation to 1837, while an Irish rowing heritage survey, citing T. F. Hall's A History of Boat Racing in Ireland, gives 1835.
5	Der Hamburger und Germania Ruder Club	1836	Germany		Founded as the Hamburger Ruder Club in 1836, generally regarded as the oldest surviving rowing club in continental Europe. Germania Ruder Club was founded subsequently; the two clubs merged in 1934 to form the present club.
6	Carrick-on-Shannon Rowing Club	1836	Ireland		Founded in 1836. The club is recognised in Irish local-government and rowing sources as one of the country's oldest rowing clubs.
7	Narragansett Boat Club	1838	United States		Founded in 1838 on the Seekonk River, Providence, Rhode Island. The Rhode Island Historical Society preserves an 1887 history describing it as the oldest rowing association in America.
8	Royal Chester Rowing Club	1838	England	Royal Chester Rowing Club blade: blue	Founded as Chester Victoria Rowing Club in 1838. It adopted the name Royal Chester Rowing Club in 1840.
9	Henley Rowing Club	c. 1839	England	Henley Rowing Club blade: dark blue with white collar	The club dates its formation to about 1839. It competed at the first Henley Regatta in 1839.
10	Detroit Boat Club	1839	United States		Founded on 18 February 1839 by a group of Detroit citizens for rowing on the Detroit River, and generally described by American and Detroit-based historical sources as the oldest rowing club in the United States. Fire destroyed the clubhouse in 1848 and again in 1893 and 1901; since 1996 rowing at the historic clubhouse has been carried on by the separately organised Detroit Boat Club Crew rather than the original club corporation, so continuity of the present rowing activity under that name is a reorganisation rather than an unbroken corporate history.
11	Bann Rowing Club	1841/42	Northern Ireland		Traditionally dated to 1842. A contemporary Belfast newspaper report from 1841 describes an earlier rowing club at Coleraine which the present club identifies as its predecessor.
12	Lancaster John O'Gaunt Rowing Club	1842	England		Descended from Lancaster Rowing Club, founded in 1842. The present John O'Gaunt club arose from the division of Lancaster rowing interests in the 1860s, so the 1842 date represents predecessor ancestry rather than uninterrupted existence under the present name.
13	York City Rowing Club	1843	England	York City Rowing Club blade: white with three thin stripes of purple, black and gold	Rowing in York is documented from a club established in 1843. Later sources give different dates for the present organisation, so the 1843 date is best treated as predecessor ancestry pending fuller archival reconciliation.
14	City of Cambridge Rowing Club	1844	England	City of Cambridge Rowing Club blade: navy blue with two gold and claret stripes	Founded as Cambridge Boat Racing Club in 1844; renamed Cambridge Town Rowing Club in 1863 and City of Cambridge Rowing Club in 1932. The archival record describes the organisation as 1844–present.
15	Poplar, Blackwall and District Rowing Club	1845	England		The club dates its foundation to 1845, originally as Blackwall Rowing and Athletic Club. The present name was adopted in 1935. The club's early membership included Thames watermen and lightermen. The club is the oldest non-academic rowing club in London.
16	St Andrew Boat Club	1846	Scotland		Founded in Edinburgh in 1846; the National Records of Scotland holds the club archive for 1846–1989.
17	Dover Rowing Club	1846	England		Founded as Dover Amateur Rowing Club in 1846. It was reorganised as Dover Rowing Club in 1867.
18	Gloucester Rowing Club	1846	England	Gloucester Rowing Club blade: black with red and white stripe	Founded in 1846 and continuously associated with rowing on the River Severn at Gloucester.
19	Broxbourne Rowing Club	1847	England		Formed in 1847 and still active on the River Lea. The club describes itself as one of the oldest rowing clubs in the country.
20	Koninklijke Nederlandsche Zeil- en Roeivereeniging	16 December 1847	Netherlands		Founded in Amsterdam by members who had left the Nederlandsche Yacht Club; a combined sailing-and-rowing society generally regarded as the oldest surviving watersports club in the Netherlands, predating Amsterdam's De Hoop (below) by several months. Because it has always combined sailing with rowing rather than functioning as a dedicated rowing club, it should be treated with the same caution given elsewhere in this list to mixed sailing/rowing societies.
21	Burton Leander Rowing Club	c. 1848	England	Burton Leander Rowing Club blade: white with thin black and thick red triangle	The club is documented as competing at Burton-on-Trent regattas by 1848; the precise foundation date is less certain.
22	De Hoop	1848	Netherlands		Founded in Amsterdam in May 1848. The Amsterdam City Archives describes De Hoop as Amsterdam's oldest rowing club and holds its surviving archive.
23	Lee Rowing Club	1850	Ireland		Founded in Cork in 1850. The club subsequently used the name Cork Boat Club before returning to Lee Rowing Club.
24	Tyne Amateur Rowing Club	1852	England		Founded in 1852 and affiliated to British Rowing; the club describes itself as the longest-established rowing club on the River Tyne.
25	Bachelors Barge Club	1853	United States		Founded in 1853 and described by the club as the oldest continuously operated rowing club in the United States.
26	University Barge Club	1854	United States		Founded in 1854 by ten members of the University of Pennsylvania freshman class. Originally restricted to Penn students and alumni, the present club now has a masters programme open to all women and men.
27	London Rowing Club	1856	England	London Rowing Club blade: white with two navy blue bars	Founded on 22 May 1856. The club was established by former members of the Argonaut Club and has remained active since its foundation.
28	Clydesdale Amateur Rowing Club	1856/57	Scotland		The club's first annual report dates its formation to 1856, while 1857 subsequently became the conventional foundation date.
29	Undine Barge Club	1856	United States		Founded in Philadelphia on 9 May 1856. It subsequently became one of the founding clubs of the Schuylkill Navy.
30	Derby Rowing Club	1857	England		The club's own history describe its foundation in November 1857 by a group of railway workers who met at a pub near St Mary's Bridge, with the Derby Regatta following in 1859. A British Rowing feature on the club, by contrast, describes it as founded in a pub by friends in 1880. Given this discrepancy between sources, the earlier date should be treated with some caution.
31	Calcutta Rowing Club	1858	India		Founded in Calcutta in 1858. Although many early records were destroyed in the 1864 cyclone, the surviving 1858–59 accounts document the club's early existence.
32	Kingston Rowing Club	1858	England	Kingston Rowing Club blade: carmine red	Founded in 1858, beginning at Messenger's Boathouse before moving to Raven's Ait, Surbiton, from 1861 to 1935 and subsequently to Canbury Gardens in 1968. The club describes itself as one of the oldest rowing clubs in the world.
33	Thames Rowing Club	1860	England	Thames Rowing Club blade: black with repeating red, white and black bars	Founded as City of London Rowing Club in 1860 and renamed Thames Rowing Club in 1864.
34	Twickenham Rowing Club	1860	England	Twickenham Rowing Club blade: magenta amid dark blue	Founded on 26 July 1860.
35	Malta Boat Club	1860	United States		Founded as the Malta Barge Club on 22 February 1860 by members of the Minnehaha Lodge of the Sons of Malta, a Philadelphia fraternal order. The club relocated to the Schuylkill River in 1863 and joined the Schuylkill Navy in 1865.
36	Durham Amateur Rowing Club	1860	England		Formally constituted on 5 December 1860. The club remains active and affiliated to British Rowing. Contemporary newspaper material and the club's surviving historical research document its foundation.
37	Southsea Rowing Club	1860	England		Founded in 1860. Hants & Dorset rowing records give its racing colours and oar blade as sky blue, white and navy horizontal stripes.
38	Agecroft Rowing Club	1861	England	Agecroft Rowing Club blade: white and dark blue split by a red horizontal stripe	Formed in 1861 through the consolidation of earlier rowing clubs on the River Irwell, including Nemesis and Clarence.
39	Canterbury Rowing Club	1861	New Zealand		Founded in 1861 and recognised by Rowing New Zealand as the country's oldest rowing club.
40	Hereford Rowing Club	1861	England		The club was created at the Saracen's Head Inn on 26 June 1861 and remains active on the River Wye.
41	Società Canottieri Limite	1861	Italy		Founded in Limite sull'Arno in 1861. The club traces its origins to boat racing among workers at the Picchiotti shipyard in the preceding year.
42	Pennsylvania Barge Club	1861	United States		Founded on 4 June 1861 as the Atlantic Barge Club and subsequently renamed Pennsylvania Barge Club. It joined the Schuylkill Navy on 17 August 1865. The club was inactive for a period after the Second World War before being reactivated in 2008–09, so recent continuity is treated as a revival rather than unbroken operation.
43	Warwick Boat Club	1861	England		Founded on 6 February 1861, when five men met in Warwick to discuss forming a rowing club; a set of rules followed on 3 March and a boathouse was built at Rock Mills on the River Avon. The club moved to its present site in 1865.
44	Richmond Rowing Club	1863	Australia		Founded in Melbourne on 17 June 1863. The surviving inaugural minutes provide unusually direct evidence of the foundation date.
45	Erster Wiener Ruderclub LIA	1863	Austria		Founded in Vienna in 1863; the club traces its formal establishment to 11 September 1863 and remains active today. Its history documents continued existence through the end of the Habsburg monarchy, the World Wars, and the post-war period.
46	Trent Rowing Club	1863	England		Founded on the River Trent at Burton upon Trent; sometimes referred to locally as Trent Royal. The club dates its amateur status to 1863, the year in which English rowing clubs generally came under the Amateur Rowing Association, though it also traces an earlier professional win at Derby Regatta in 1859.
47	Evesham Rowing Club	1863	England		Founded in 1863 by twelve townsfolk "to pursue the manly and innocent recreation of rowing", on the River Avon at Evesham, Worcestershire.
48	Tees Rowing Club	1864	England		Founded as Tees Amateur Boating Club in about 1864 at Stockton-on-Tees. The present club took its current name after amalgamating with other local rowing interests after the Second World War.
49	Clyde Amateur Rowing Club	1865	Scotland		The club's constitution was formally recognised in 1865; its own history acknowledges possible informal activity before that date.
50	Vesper Boat Club	1865	United States		Founded on 22 February 1865 as the Washington Barge Club on Philadelphia's Schuylkill River; renamed Vesper Boat Club in 1870. Vesper crews subsequently won Olympic gold in the eight in 1900, 1904, and 1964.
51	St Neots Rowing Club	1865	England		Organised rowing is believed to have begun at St Neots on the River Great Ouse in 1865, though the first recorded open regatta there was not held until 1874.
52	Nithsdale Amateur Rowing Club	1865	Scotland		Founded as the Nith Regatta Club on 4 September 1865, when fourteen men met at Ingram's Hotel, Dumfries; the boathouse was completed in March 1866. The club was renamed Nithsdale Amateur Rowing Club in 1890.
53	Aberdeen Boat Club	1865	Scotland		Founded in 1865 on the River Dee at Aberdeen, when four boats were purchased; described by the club as one of Scotland's largest and longest-established rowing clubs.
54	Bournemouth Rowing Club	1865	England		Founded in 1865, originally as Westover and Bournemouth Rowing Club, when a lease of foreshore was secured from the Bournemouth Improvement Commissioners; described by the club as the oldest club in Bournemouth, though at this early date the town had fewer than 4,000 residents and organised racing developed only gradually.
55	Star Boating Club	1866	New Zealand		Founded as Star Regatta Club in 1866 and soon renamed Star Boating Club. Heritage New Zealand describes it as operating continuously since 1866.
56	Molesey Boat Club	1866	England	Molesey Boat Club blade: black	Founded on 26 April 1866 at a public meeting at the Prince of Wales Hotel in East Molesey. The club went on to establish Molesey Regatta the following year, 1867.
57	Curlew Rowing Club	1866	England		Founded in 1866 at Greenwich to rent the former Crown and Sceptre Inn, incorporating the earlier "Curley" crew (documented from a 1787 regatta) together with the residue of the Argonauts Club and another crew, "Lurline". Some Argonauts members had earlier left to found London Rowing Club (1856); Curlew has occupied Greenwich continuously since.
58	Wiener Ruderverein Donauhort	1867	Austria		The club's origins are traced to an informal rowing group established in 1864, with the formal association founded in 1867. It remains active in Vienna and documents its institutional history from the 1860s to the present.
59	Reading Rowing Club	1867	England		Founded in 1867 at Reading, reviving the Reading Amateur Regatta, which had itself been established in 1842 as a town event rather than a club fixture.
60	Bradford Amateur Rowing Club	1867	England		Founded in 1867 on the River Aire; the clubhouse at Saltaire was built in 1893 on land given to the club by Sir Titus Salt.
61	Tynemouth Rowing Club	1867	England		Founded in 1867 by members who had left the Northern Rowing Club, based at Priors Haven near the mouth of the River Tyne; distinct from the older Tyne Amateur Rowing Club (1852) listed above.
62	Staines Boat Club	1867/9	England		The club notes that it was founded in 1869, however Staines Boating Club is recorded as racing as early as 1867..
63	Sudbury Rowing Club	1869	England		Founded in 1869 as the Stour Boat Club, when the boat races on the River Stour at Sudbury, Suffolk, featured a newly established club of that name; a separate and short-lived Sudbury Boat Club had existed from 1867. The club's own 150th-anniversary material in 2024, however, dates its foundation to 1874, so the earlier date should be treated with some caution.
64	Potomac Boat Club	1869	United States	Potomac Boat Club blade: red with white star	Founded in 1869, originally as the Potomac Barge Club, on the Potomac River in Georgetown, Washington, D.C. It is generally described as the oldest rowing club in the Washington, D.C. area.
65	Grosvenor Rowing Club	1869	England		Founded in 1869 on the River Dee at Chester, to serve "the clerks and assistants in the city". Unlike its neighbour Royal Chester Rowing Club, which was traditionally limited to alumni of the King's School, Chester, Grosvenor had open membership from the outset.
66	Vesta Rowing Club	1870	England		Founded following in 1870 and named after the first boat to pass under London Bridge during its inaugural meeting. The club moved to its present location in 1890.
67	Sydney Rowing Club	1870	Australia		Founded following a meeting on 7 March 1870 and formally inaugurated later that year.
68	Bristol Ariel Rowing Club	1870	England		Founded in 1870 and generally described as the oldest rowing club in Bristol, on the River Avon; named after its original boathouse, a former French frigate moored near Bristol Bridge.
69	Argonaut Rowing Club	1872	Canada		Founded on 21 June 1872 by amateur oarsmen formerly associated with the Orioles.
70	Buenos Aires Rowing Club	1873	Argentina		Founded on 16 December 1873 following the development of rowing on the Río de la Plata earlier that year.
71	Wiener Ruderclub Pirat	1875	Austria		Founded in Vienna in 1875. The club subsequently absorbed or merged with other rowing organisations, including Triton in 1939, but the Pirat institution continued and remains active today.

== See also ==
- Rowing (sport)
- Leander Club
- Schuylkill Navy
- Henley Royal Regatta
- List of rowing clubs
