= Silvermere Lake =

Silvermere Lake may refer to

- Silvermere Lake (Canada)
- Silvermere Lake (England)
