= 1974 British Rowing Championships =

- Venue: National Water Sports Centre
- Location: Holme Pierrepont (Nottingham)
- Dates: 20–21 July 1974

The 1974 National Rowing Championships was the third edition of the National Championships, held from 20–21 July 1974 at the National Water Sports Centre in Holme Pierrepont, Nottingham. There was a record entry of 330 crews. Leander won the John Player Trophy (men's Victor Ludorum) and Civil Service won the Charlton Cup (women's Victor Ludorum).

== Senior ==
=== Medal summary ===
Event	Gold	Silver	Bronze
Men Victor Ludorum	Leander	Tideway Scullers School	London University
Men 1x	Poplar; Kenny Dwan	Henley; L Brown	Hereford; M Griffiths
Men 2+	Wallingford; Carl Purchase & Colin Cusack	City Orient; Carruthers & White	St Edward's; Oliver Brocklehurst & Smith
Men 2x	Leander; Michael Hart & Chris Baillieu	Tideway Scullers School; Dick Findlay & Martin Spencer	Weybridge / Abingdon; Peter Levy & Ian Marriott
Men 2-	Reading / Wallingford; Tony Richardson & Colin Cusack	St Ives; Tony Cowley & Nigel Drake	Tideway Scullers School; Proffitt & Wells
Men 4-	Leander / Thames Tradesmen's	Leander	Leander / Tideway Scullers School
Men 4+	Leander / Thames Tradesmen's	Lady Margaret / London University / Thames Tradesmen's	Wallingford Schools
Men 4x	Durham / Henley / Leander / Wallingford	Tideway Scullers School	Kingston
Men 8+	Leander / Thames Tradesmen's	Leander	Eton College
Women Victor Ludorum	Civil Service Ladies		
Women 1x	Jessamy Scullers; Christine Davies	Ann Cork	
Women 2x	Derby / Nottingham; Lorraine Baker & Liz Lorrimer	Civil Service Ladies / Weybridge Ladies; Jackie Darling & Pauline Bird-Hart	
Women 2-	Civil Service Ladies; Liz Monti & Lin Clark	Weybridge Ladies; Chris Grimes & Maggie Lambourn	Derby / Nottingham; Lorraine Baker & Liz Lorrimer
Women 4+	Civil Service Ladies / Weybridge Ladies; Clare Grove, Chris Aistrop, Maggie Lambourn, Chris Grimes	Civil Service Ladies	
Women 4x	Civil Service Ladies / Derby / Durham / Nottingham / Weybridge Ladies; Pauline Bird-Hart, Lorraine Baker, Liz Lorrimer, Jackie Darling	Thames composite Jean Rankine	

== Lightweight ==
=== Medal summary ===
Event	Gold	Silver	Bronze
Men 1x	Durham		
Men 4-	Leander / Tideway Scullers School		
Men 8+	Leander / Marlow / Quintin / Thames; Thames Tradesmen's / London University		

== Junior ==
=== Medal summary ===
Event	Gold	Silver	Bronze
Men 1x	Tideway Scullers School		
Men 2-	Pangbourne College		
Men 2x	Maidenhead / Molesey		
Men 2+	Abingdon / John Mason High School		
Men 4-	Radley College / Wallingford		
Men 4+	Wallingford Schools		
Men 4x	Abingdon / Radley College		
Men 8+	Eton College		
Men J16 1x	Poplar		
Men J16 2-	Emanuel School	Nottingham and Union RC	
Men J16 2x	Abingdon / John Mason High School		
Men J16 2+	Radley College		
Men J16 4+	Wallingford Schools		
Men J16 4-	King's School Chester		
Men J16 8+	Emanuel School		
Women 4+	Civil Service Ladies / Gilliat School / Emanuel School		

Key

Symbol	meaning
1, 2, 4, 8	crew size
+	coxed
-	coxless
x	sculls
14	Under-14
15	Under-15
16	Under-16
J	Junior
