= Lorraine Baker (rower) =

British rower

Personal information
- Born: 3rd quarter 1956; Derby, Derbyshire

Sport
- Sport: Rowing
- Club: Derby RC; Civil Service Ladies

Lorraine M Baker (married name Prince; born 1956) is a retired rower who competed for Great Britain.

== Rowing career ==
Baker first started rowing at Derby Rowing Club aged 15, she began in a pair with Sue North, the Derby captain before moving into a four in 1973.

She became a double British champion in 1974 when winning the double sculls with Liz Lorrimer and the quadruple sculls at the 1974 British Rowing Championships. She was consequently selected by Great Britain for the 1974 World Rowing Championships in Lucerne which was the inaugural championships for women. Competing in the quadruple sculls event the crew were eliminated during the heats.

In 1976 she was still part of the British squad and aimed for the 1976 Summer Olympics but the British team decided not to take a sculling crew to the Olympics. She married Ian Prince in Derby during the same year.
