= Chris Aistrop =

British rower

Personal information
- Birth name: Christine Aistrop
- Born: 1947; London

Sport
- Sport: Rowing
- Club: Weybridge Ladies; Thames Valley Skiff Club

Christine Aistrop (born 1947) is a retired rower who competed for Great Britain.

== Rowing career ==
Aistrop started rowing when she switched from skiffing and joined the Weybridge Ladies Amateur Rowing Club in 1972.

In 1974 she won a British title at the 1974 British Rowing Championships in the coxed four with Clare Grove, Maggie Lambourn and Chris Grimes. and was consequently selected by Great Britain for the 1974 World Rowing Championships in Lucerne which was the inaugural championships for women. Competing in the coxed four event the crew finished 11th overall after a fifth place finish in the B final.

== Administrative career ==
At the 1975 World Rowing Championships she was the Ladies British team manager. She was jointly responsible with Rosemary Mayglothling for setting up the Henley Women's Regatta in June 1988 and was the first chairman.
