= Liz Lorrimer =

British rower

Personal information
- Born: Wendy Elizabeth Pickering; 3rd quarter 1946 Leicester, Leicestershire

Sport
- Sport: Rowing
- Club: St Aidan's College BC; Cambridge University WBC; Leicester RC; Gloucester RC; Nottingham BC

Wendy Elizabeth Lorrimer (née Pickering; born 1946) is a retired rower who competed for Great Britain.

== Rowing career ==
Lorrimer first started rowing at Durham University in 1965 and was the first female member of the Leicester Rowing Club. While attending Cambridge University she won the 1969 boat race and married Tony Lorrimer in Leicester during the same year. She moved to Gloucester, and later to Nottingham where she became the first female member of the Nottingham Rowing Club as well.

She became a double British champion in 1974 when winning the double sculls with Lorraine Baker and the quadruple sculls at the 1974 British Rowing Championships. She was consequently selected by Great Britain for the 1974 World Rowing Championships in Lucerne which was the inaugural championships for women. Competing in the quadruple sculls event the crew were eliminated during the heats.
