= Weybridge Ladies Amateur Rowing Club =

British rowing club

- Emblem 1: WLARC (three colours per letter) 2: crossed oars surmounted by stylised flag in club colours
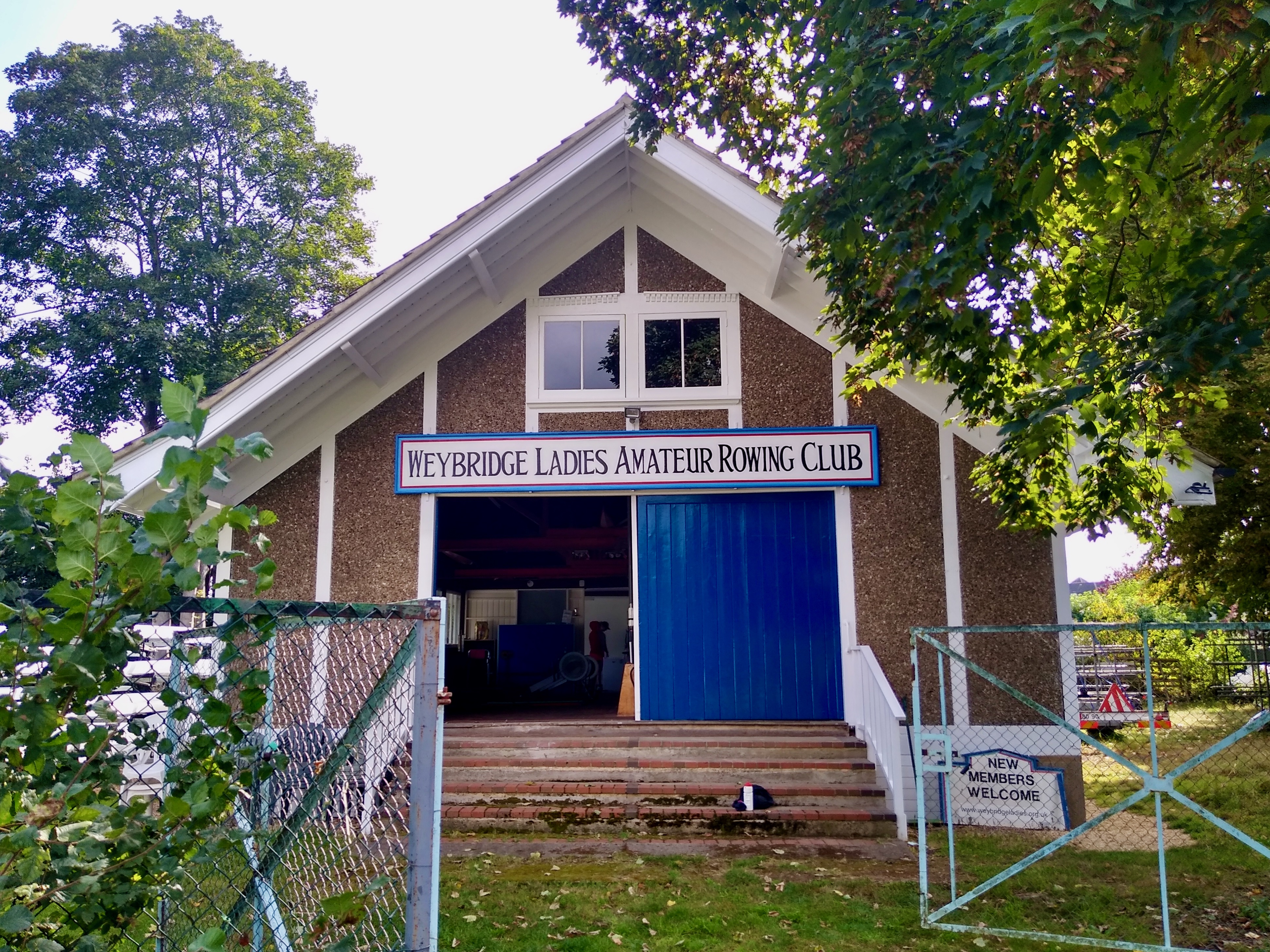

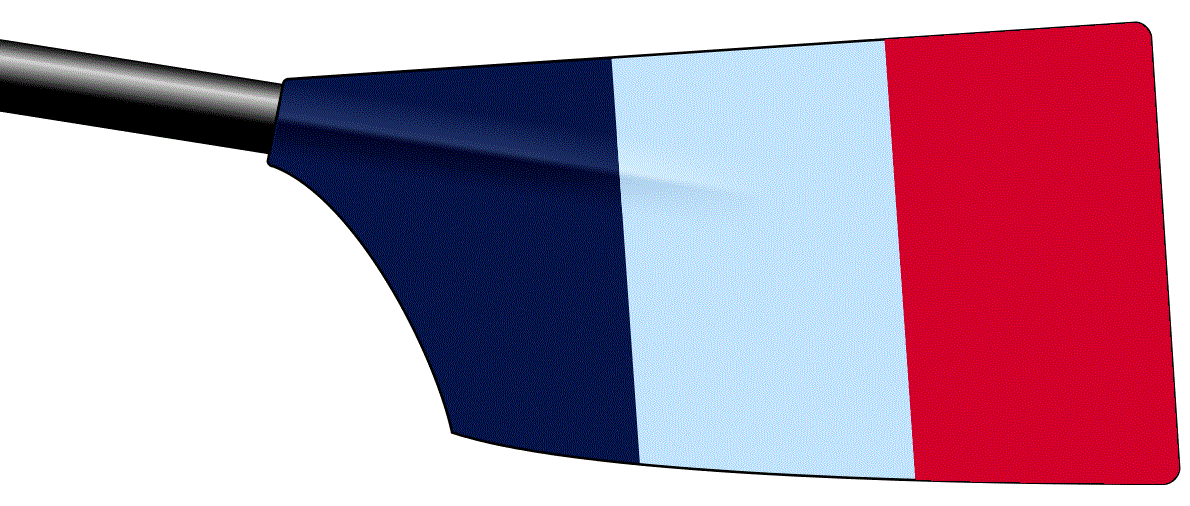
- Location: Boat House, Walton Lane, Weybridge, Elmbridge, Surrey
- Coordinates: 51.3809°N 0.4567°W
- Home water: The reach above Sunbury Lock, River Thames
- Founded: 1926
- Membership: Ages 13+
- Affiliations: British Rowing (boat code WEL)
- Website: weybridgeladies.org.uk

Events
- WLARC Regatta (including juniors of both sexes) (mid-to-late May)

Distinctions
- One other UK women's rowing/sculling club exists: Barnes Bridge Ladies (incorporating Civil Service Ladies)

Notable members
- Amy Gentry (founder)

Weybridge Ladies Amateur Rowing Club (WLARC) is a rowing club at the confluence of a mouth of the Wey and two weirstreams of the Thames, based at Boat House, Walton Lane, Weybridge, Elmbridge, Surrey.

== Site and watersports reach ==
The site is owned by the club outright; its car park is time-of-stay, height- and width-restricted but public. For details of all the other well-established clubs on the reach see the list at Weybridge Rowing Club.

== Colours ==
The colours of the club are, but for the red being lighter, the same as those of Walton Rowing Club – both resemble Oxford Brookes Boat Club which has white as the middle band.

== History ==
The club was founded in 1926 and is affiliated to British Rowing. Amy Gentry founded the club at its Weybridge Point site six years after forming a thriving women's group at Weybridge Rowing Club.

The club has produced multiple British champions across many boat sizes, especially in the 1980s.

== Honours ==
=== British champions ===
| Year | Prefix | Winning crew/s | | |
|---|---|---|---|---|
| 1974 | W | 4+ | 4x | |
| 1975 | W | 2x | 4x | |
| 1979 | W | J18 4+ | J18 8+ | |
| 1980 | W | 2- | J Victor Ludorum | J18 Women 2- |
| 1981 | W | J Victor Ludorum | | |
| 1982 | W | J Victor Ludorum | J18 2x | J18 8+ |
| 1984 | W | J18 8+ | | |
| 1985 | W | 2- | | |
| 1986 | W | L (lightweight) 2x | J16 1x | J14 1x |
| 1987 | W | 2- | | |
| 2004 | W | J18 4x | | |

== See also ==
- Rowing on the River Thames
