= William Atkinson (architect) =

English architect (1774/1775–1839)

William Atkinson (1774/1775–1839) was an English architect best known for his designs for country houses in the Gothic style. He undertook almost fifty commissions, broadly distributed in the north of England and the Scottish Lowlands, London and the surrounding counties, with occasional excursions to Herefordshire, Staffordshire, and Ireland. His Gothic oeuvre fitted between playful 18th-century eclecticism and the more rigorous archaeological approach of the later Gothic revival.

== Early life ==
Atkinson was born at Bishop Auckland, County Durham. He was probably the son of a William Atkinson who worked during the 1760s as a builder at nearby Auckland Castle, the palace of the bishops of Durham. The younger Atkinson began work as a carpenter and in the mid-1790s came to the attention of the prominent architect James Wyatt, then making alterations to the castle, who took him as a pupil. In July 1796 Atkinson, aged twenty-two, entered the Royal Academy Schools where in 1797 he won a gold medal.

== Architectural career ==
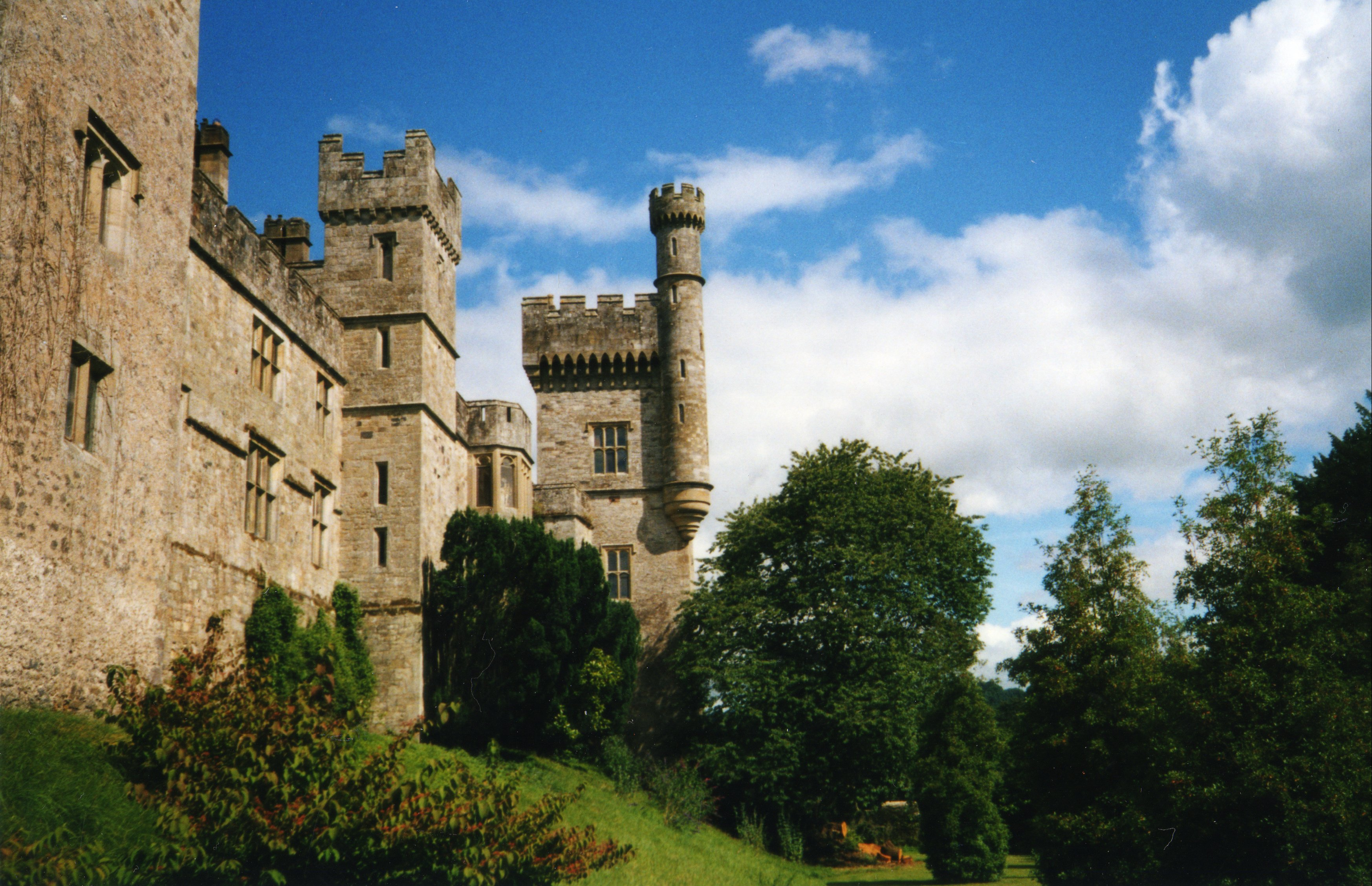
Lismore Castle remodelled by William Atkinson

Atkinson's career as an independent architect began about 1800. Between 1804 and 1834 some twelve country houses were built or remodelled to his designs in the Gothic or castle style. They included Chiddingstone Castle in Kent (1800), Chequers, Buckinghamshire (1823), and Lismore Castle, Co. Waterford, Ireland. Of four houses in Scotland, as well as his Gothic reconstruction (1803–12) of Scone Palace, Abbotsford (1816–23) for Sir Walter Scott remains notable, despite contributions to his designs from the architect Edward Blore and others (including Scott himself).

Atkinson seems never to have executed entire classical buildings, but before 1825 he carried out several additions or alterations to country houses in this style. They include Bretton Hall (1807) and Broughton Hall (1809–11), both in West Yorkshire, Gorhambury, Hertfordshire (1816–17), and Hylands, Essex (1819–25). Atkinson also worked on seven churches, including Durham Cathedral, and All Saints', Newton Heath (1814–16), the only one wholly rebuilt to his designs. He made minor modifications to a handful of public buildings, all in the London, including the Ordnance office in Pall Mall (demolished), the Tower of London, and Woolwich Arsenal. His work on London town houses included the addition of the Flemish picture gallery (1819–20) to Thomas Hope's house in Duchess Street, Portland Place, to the designs of Hope, for whom Atkinson had recently remodelled his country seat, Deepdene, in Surrey.

== Other interests ==
Besides architecture, Atkinson's great interests were chemistry, geology, and particularly botany. He combined the first two when, about 1810, he successfully introduced to the London market a Roman cement, known as Atkinson's cement, which could be used either externally or internally as stucco or rendering. Its significant ingredient, calcareous clay, he extracted from land in north Yorkshire belonging to the 1st Earl of Mulgrave, for whom he had recently remodelled Mulgrave Castle, near Whitby; he then shipped the clay to Westminster, where he owned a wharf. Lord Mulgrave, at that time master-general of the ordnance, was instrumental in Atkinson's succeeding James Wyatt, on 1 October 1813, as architect to the Board of Ordnance, a post he retained until his department was abolished on 1 January 1829.

Atkinson indulged his passion for horticulture by often planting rare species, for example in the gardens of the villa which he built for himself about 1818 at Grove End in Paddington and, later, in the 170-acre (0.69 km^{2}) estate he purchased about 1830 at Silvermere, near Cobham, Surrey, where he also built himself a house. It was here that he died on 22 May 1839, aged sixty-six. He was buried at nearby Walton-on-Thames. During his career he had attracted numerous pupils, including Thomas Allason, Robert Richardson Banks, Peter Hubert Desvignes, Matthew Habershon, John Burgess Watson, and his nephew Thomas Tredgold. The younger of his two sons, Henry George Atkinson, also became an architect.

== Sources ==
- J. Archer, The Literature of British Domestic Architecture, 1715–1842 (1985)
- Wyatt Papworth (ed.), The Dictionary of Architecture, 11 vols. (1853–92)
- Riddell, Richard. "Atkinson, William". Oxford Dictionary of National Biography (online ed.). Oxford University Press. doi:10.1093/ref:odnb/860. (Subscription, Wikipedia Library access or UK public library membership required.)
