= Henley Women's Regatta =

Rowing regatta in England

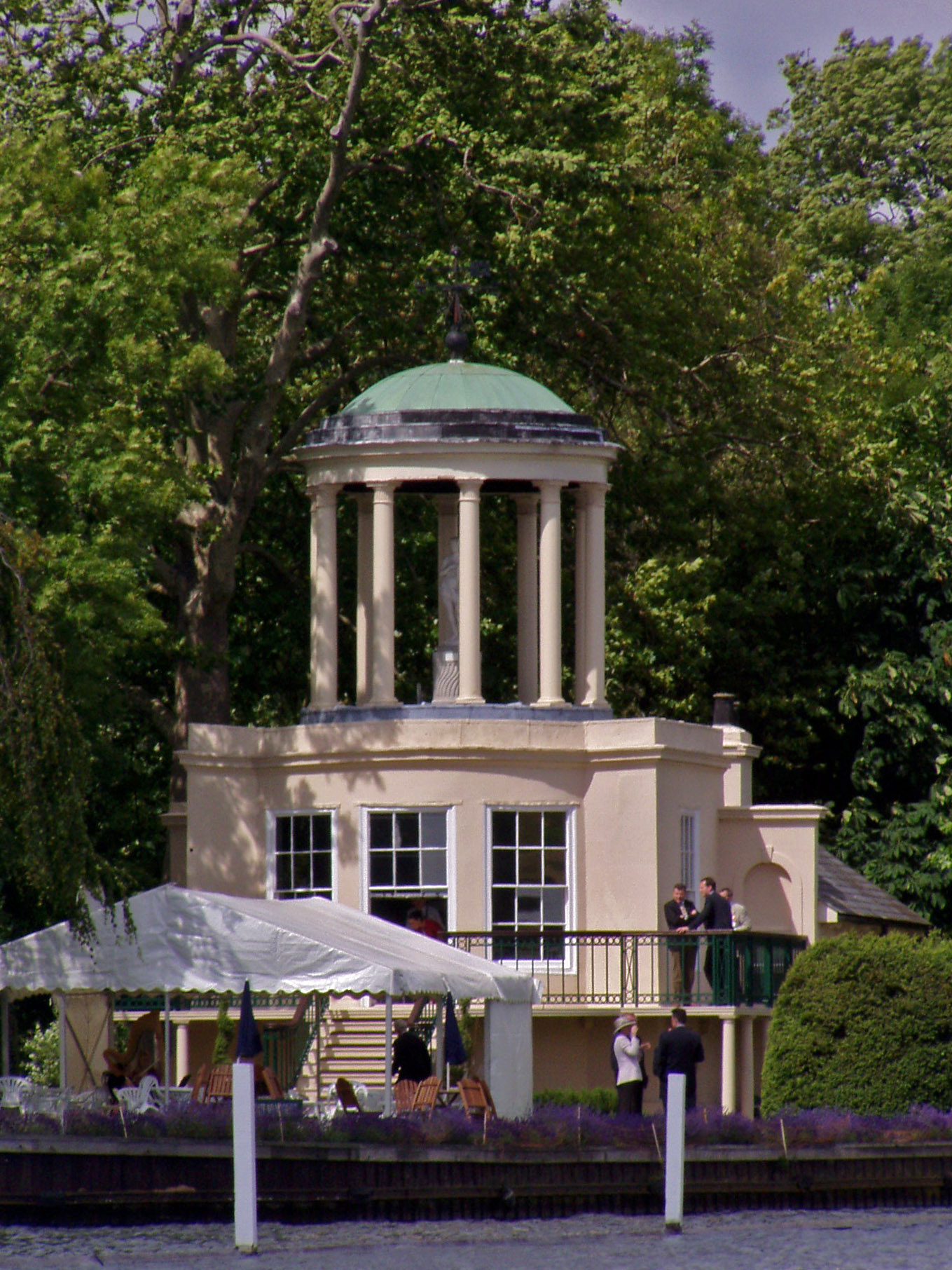
The Temple on Temple Island, the iconic starting point of Henley Women's Regatta in Henley-on-Thames, England

Henley Women's Regatta (HWR or Women's Henley) is a rowing regatta held on the River Thames near to Henley-on-Thames, England. It takes place over a Friday, Saturday and Sunday in mid to late June.

The regatta is held using a shortened version of the boomed course used for the Henley Royal Regatta, with the shorter course due to Environment Agency safety restrictions and the short intervals between races. The course is 1,500 metres (4,900 ft) long, in comparison with the Royal Regatta's 2,112 metres (6,929 ft). With a start downstream of Temple Island and a finish in front of the Remenham Club, no part of the event actually takes place within Henley, and the course is divided between the counties of Berkshire and Buckinghamshire. Most of the facilities, including the Friends of Henley Women's Regatta, or Chairman's, enclosure, are in the Berkshire civil parish of Remenham.

The first regatta was held in 1988, as a response to the absence of women's events at Henley Royal Regatta at the time. Chris Aistrop and Rosemary Mayglothling were jointly responsible for setting up the regatta and Aistrop was the first chairman.

While Henley Royal Regatta now offers 14 women's events, as of 2026 , HWR has continued to build and expand. Henley Women's Regatta now lasts three full days, and includes time trials for over-subscribed events.

In 2004 HWR offered intermediate, senior and elite categories instead of college, club and open. Junior categories have also always been on the programme. In 2011 the regatta also began to offer Adaptive events. On 1 December 2017 HWR announced that the competition structure would be altered for the 2018 regatta to recategorise the events into championship, aspirational, development, junior, junior under 16, and para rowing.

In December 2024 HWR announced it was dropping its J16 events, but allowing J16 athletes to compete in junior events. On 9 December 2025, HWR announced the addition of two new events for quadruple sculls, and the removal of the Parkside Trophy for championship lightweight coxless pairs.

The current regatta chair is Naomi Ashcroft and the joint patrons of the regatta are Sir Steven Redgrave and Lady Redgrave.

== Events ==
The list of events for 2026 is:

- Championship
  - The Ron Needs Cup (Eights)
  - The Avril Vellacott Cup (Coxless Fours)
  - The Borne Cup (Quad Sculls)
  - The Redgrave Vase (Coxless Pairs)
  - The W. Peer Cup (Double Sculls)
  - The George Innes Cup (Single Sculls)
  - The Haslam Trophy (Lwt Double Sculls)
  - The Godfrey Rowsports Trophy (Lwt Single Sculls)
- Aspirational
  - The Colgan Foundation Cup (Academic Eights)
  - The Copas Cup (Club Eights)
  - The Cathy Cruickshank Trophy (Academic Coxless Fours)
  - The Lester Trophy (Club Coxless Fours)
  - The Nina Padwick Trophy (Academic Quad Sculls)
  - The Chairman's Trophy (Club Quad Sculls)
  - The Rosie Mayglothling Trophy (Double Sculls)
  - The Bernard Churcher Trophy (Single Sculls)
  - The Fiona Dennis Trophy (Lwt Single Sculls)
- Development
  - The Frank V Harry Cup (Coxed Fours)
- Junior
  - The Peabody Cup (Eights)
  - The Groton School Challenge Cup (Coxed Fours)
  - The Bea Langridge Trophy (Quad Sculls)
  - The Rayner Cup (Double Sculls)
  - The Di Ellis Trophy (Single Sculls)
- Para Rowing
  - The Grosvenor Cup (Para-Rowing Single Sculls)

== See also ==
- Henley Royal Regatta
- Henley Boat Races
- Rowing on the River Thames
