= Robert Milligan (rower) =

British rower (born 1952)

Personal information
- Nationality: British
- Born: 2nd quarter 1952 London

Sport
- Sport: Rowing
- Club: Poplar Blackwall and District RC

Robert Milligan (born 1952) is a British rower who competed for Great Britain.

== Rowing career ==
Milligan was part of the eight that reached the final and finished 5th, at the 1977 World Rowing Championships in Amsterdam.

He rowed in the 2019 World Masters Regatta and won the 2016 World Masters single scull, rowing Poplar Blackwall and District Rowing Club.
