= Town Challenge Cup (men) =

Former annual rowing event

- Venue: Henley Royal Regatta, River Thames
- Location: Henley-on-Thames, Oxfordshire
- Dates: 1839 – 1883

Town Challenge Cup was a rowing event for men's club fours at the annual Henley Royal Regatta on the River Thames at Henley-on-Thames in England.

The event ran from 1839 until 1883. The trophy which was awarded during the duration of the event is now used by a different regatta known as the Henley Town and Visitors Regatta. It is awarded for the Regatta’s highest-ranking fours event but today has no connection to the Henley Royal Regatta.

== Past winners ==
Year	Winner	Runner-Up
1839	The Wave	The Albion
1840	The Dreadnought	The Albion
1841	Dreadnought Club, Henley	Rowed Over
1842	Dreadnought Club, Henley	Rowed over
1843	Albion Club, Henley	Dreadnought Club, Henley
1844	Henley Aquatic Club	Albion Club, Henley
1845	Henley Aquatic Club	Rowed Over
1846	Dreadnought Club, Henley	Rowed Over
1847	Dreadnought Club, Henley	Rowed Over
1848	Dreadnought Club, Henley	Henley Aquatic Club
1849	Albion Club, Henley	Rowed Over
1850	Albion Club, Henley	Albion Club, Henley
1854	Defiance Boat Club, Wargrave	Henley Boat Club
1855	Henley Boat Club	Defiance Boat Club, Wargrave
1856	Lady Margaret, Cambridge	Defiance Boat Club, Wargrave
1857	Henley Boat Club	Rowed Over
1858	Henley Boat Club	Rowed Over
1859	Henley Boat Club	Rowed Over
1860	Dreadnought Club, Henley	Henley Boat Club
1861	Henley Boat Club	Rowed Over
1862	Oxford Staff Rowing Club	Windsor Rowing Club
1863	Henley Boat Club	The Elms Club, Caversham
1864	Henley Boat Club	Grammar School, Henley
1865	Henley Boat Club	Grammar School, Henley
1866	Eton College & Eton Excelsior	Henley Boat Club
1867	Eton College & Eton Excelsior	Henley Boat Club
1868	Henley Boat Club	Rowed Over
1869	Eton College & Eton Excelsior	Henley Boat Club
1870	Eton College & Eton Excelsior	Dreadnought Club, Henley
1871	Reading Rowing Club	Eton College & Eton Excelsior
1872	Marlow Rowing Club	Henley Rowing Club
1873	Henley Rowing Club	Eton College & Eton Excelsior
1874	Marlow Rowing Club	Henley Rowing Club
1875	Marlow Rowing Club	Rowed Over
1876	Marlow Rowing Club	Abingdon Rowing Club
1877	Marlow Rowing Club	Henley Rowing Club
1878	Henley Rowing Club	Neptune Rowing Club, Oxford
1879	Greenwood Lodge Boat Club, Wargrave	Henley Rowing Club
1880	Reading Rowing Club	Neptune Rowing Club, Oxford
1881	Reading Rowing Club	Marlow Rowing Club
1882	Reading Rowing Club	Marlow Rowing Club
1883	Marlow Rowing Club	Maidenhead Rowing Club
