= Kenny Dwan =

British rower

Personal information
- Full name: Kenneth Victor Dwan
- Nationality: British
- Born: 6 July 1948 (age 77) Rotherhithe, London

Sport
- Club: Poplar Blackwall and District Rowing Club

Kenneth Victor Dwan (born 6 July 1948) is a British former rower who competed in the Olympic Games in 1968 and 1972 and won the Wingfield Sculls six times.

== Rowing career ==
Dwan was born in Rotherhithe, London to a family of lightermen in the Port of London. He joined Poplar Blackwall and District Rowing Club at the age of 12, initially as a cox but soon as an oarsman. When he was 15 he was apprenticed as lighterman to his grandfather Williams and this allowed him to enter the novice sculls in the National Dock Labour Board (NDLB) regatta at Putney. He won the race which included contestants of that year's Doggett's Coat and Badge Race. While he was sculling he continued working as a lighterman and worked for Humphrey & Grey starting as a boy in the tug Sir John. After two year with Humphrey & Grey he obtained his lighterman's licence and went on the dock labour pool to experience a variety of firms. During 1967 the decasualisation scheme following Devlin's report was implemented and all dock workers had to be allocated to an employer. Dwan was allocated to F.T. Everard at Greenhithe, of whom he said “The management were very good to me in allowing me time to train. I could not have wished for better employers”.

In 1968 Dwan was runner-up in the Diamond Challenge Sculls at Henley Royal Regatta. He also competed for Great Britain in the single scull in the 1968 Summer Olympics in Mexico. He reached the final and came 6th overall. Also in 1968 he won the Wingfield Sculls for the first time. He won the Wingfield Sculls again in 1969, 1970, 1971 and 1972, and won Doggett's in 1971. In 1972 he won the inaugural national single sculls title, at the 1972 National Championships before he competed again for Great Britain in the single scull in the Summer Olympics in Munich when he came ninth.

The following year he won a second single sculls title at the 1973 National Championships and then went on to win a third consecutive title at the 1974 National Championships. Dwan was runner up in the Diamond Challenge Sculls in 1974 and won the Wingfield Sculls for the sixth time in 1975 and the national single sculls for a fourth time at the 1975 National Championships (a record equalled in 1990 by Simon Larkin).

== Business career ==
In 1977 Dwan was accepted as one of Royal Watermen during the Queen's Jubilee Year. Dwan continued to work as a lighterman, but with severance at the docks, he decided to work for himself and withdrew from lighterage and rowing at the same time. For a while he worked on the building of the Thames Barrier, and then on pleasure boats on the River Thames. He then went into business with Bill Ludgrove and set up their own company Thames Cruises. The business grew and they bought a repair yard at Eel Pie Island. Thames Cruises owned the pleasure boat Marchioness which was sunk with loss of life in the Marchioness disaster when the pleasure boat collided with a dredger ""Bowbelle" in August 1989. The disaster was found by the Marine Accident Investigation Branch to have been caused by the poor visibility from each ship's wheelhouse, the fact that both vessels were using the centre of the river, and that no clear instructions were given to the look-out at the bow of the Bowbelle. Twelve years later another report by Lord Clarke also blamed poor lookouts on both vessels for the collision and criticised the owners and managers of both vessels for failing to properly instruct and monitor their crews. In 2004 Dwan was appointed Queen's Bargemaster, being responsible for the safety of the Queen when she travelled by water. However, in the light of protests because of his involvement with the Marchioness disaster, he resigned.

In 2020 Dwan was hospitalized due to becoming ill from COVID-19 and recovered.
