= Poplar, Blackwall and District Rowing Club =

Amateur rowing club in England, UK

Poplar Blackwall and District Rowing Club
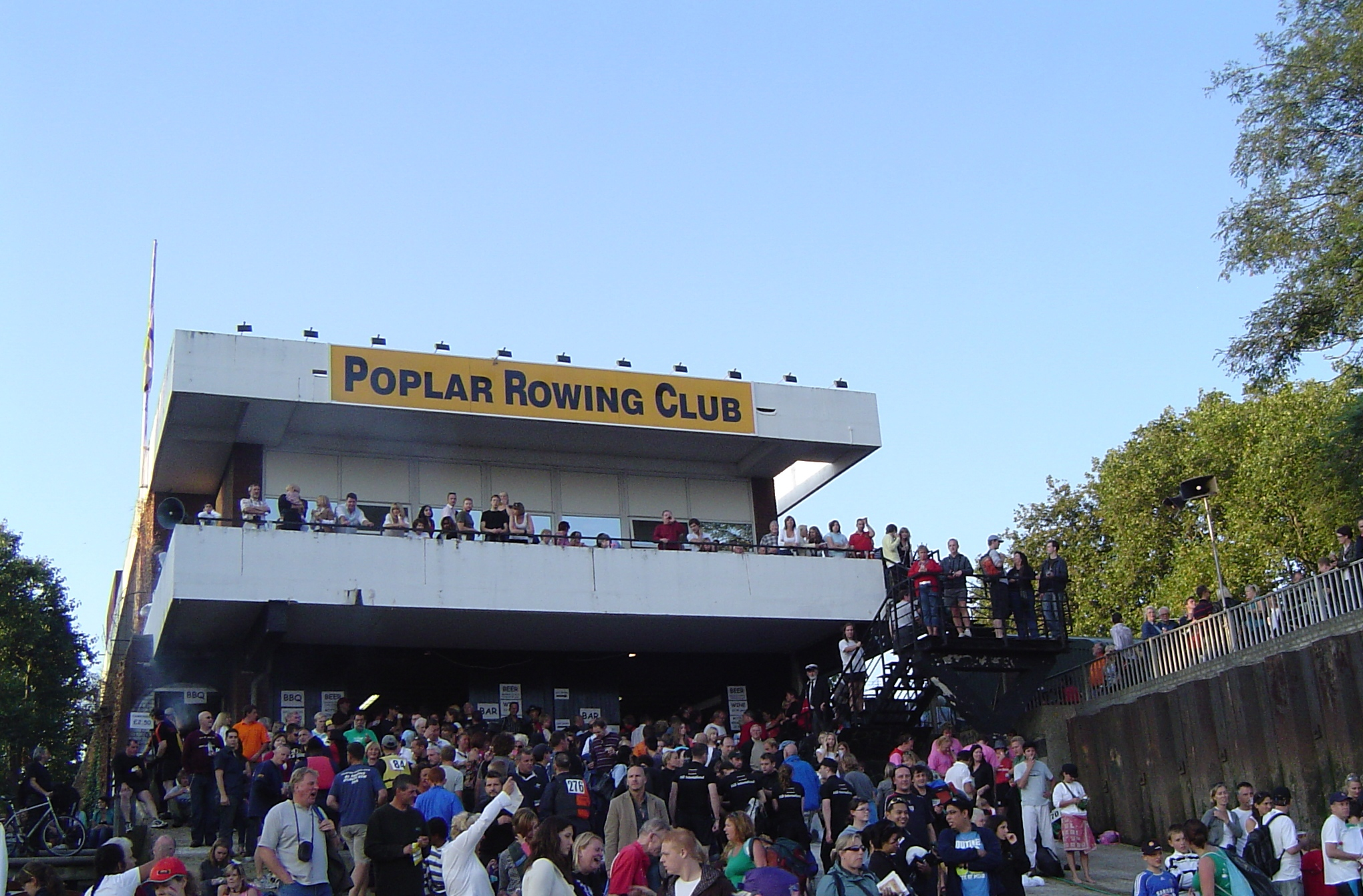

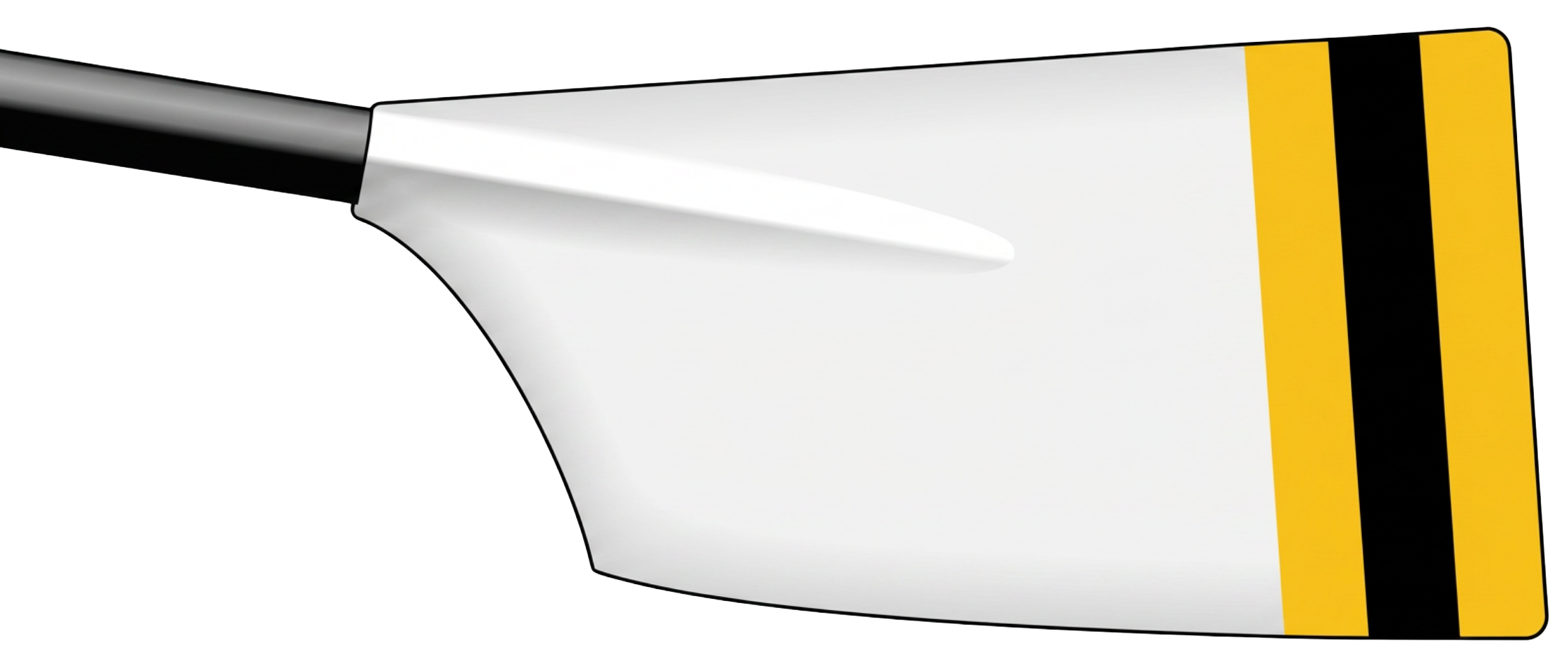
- Location: Isle of Dogs, London, England
- Coordinates: 51°29′12″N 0°0′36″W
- Home water: Tideway
- Founded: 1845
- Former names: The Blackwall Rowing and Athletic Club
- Affiliations: British Rowing boat code - PBD
- Website: www.pbdrc.co.uk

Events
- Poplar Regatta

Notable members
- Mark Hunter, Kenny Dwan, John Roberts, Colin Seymour

Poplar Blackwall and District Rowing Club is a rowing club in Millwall, on the River Thames in England, on the northern bank of the Thames opposite Greenwich on the Isle of Dogs, London.

== Club history ==
Poplar Blackwall and District Rowing Club was founded in 1845 and is one of the oldest rowing clubs in Great Britain. It is the oldest non-academic rowing club in London. It was established by a group of young lightermen as "The Blackwall Rowing and Athletic Club". Boats were carried to the river from a local pub.

After World War I there was an increase in membership from shipwrights, boilermakers and stevedores from the nearby shipyards and docks, although the depression in the 1930s led to reduced activity again.

The club reformed with its present name in 1935 and established a club and boat house on the present site in 1937: "the boys themselves constructed a launching ramp at Calder's Wharf", using North Greenwich railway station as a shelter for the boats.

In 1951 the club was admitted to the National Amateur Rowing Association (later British Rowing), ending its classification as a professional club and enabling members to compete in all amateur regattas. In 1953 the club recorded its first notable amateur win when it competed for and won the Vale of Evesham trophy. In 1956 the club entered Henley Royal Regatta for the first time, reaching the semi-finals of the Thames Challenge Cup. Shortly before the outbreak of World War II, the club purchased four clinker fours and five rum tum sculling boats at a cost of £500; wartime restrictions prevented their use until 1945, the boats being stored beneath railway arches.

In 1964 the club became aware of Greenwich Council’s plans to buy the existing site at Calders Wharf, which up until that point had been privately leased to the club, and relocate them to the South side of the river. The then club president, Dorothea (Dolly) Woodward Fisher O.B.E. negotiated with the council to reach agreement that they fund construction of a new building themselves under the council’s proviso that a gymnasium be provided and the club, "…should cater for the poor boys and men of Poplar, Blackwall, Stepney and surrounding Districts".

An appeal was launched to raise £75,000 for construction. Club president Mrs Woodward Fisher, who also ran a prominent lighterage business together with her late husband W. J. Woodward-Fisher, in Limehouse, took the helm in securing funds, "Mrs Fisher was wonderful and got all sorts of people on board. Ex Mayor of London Lord Rothchilds, Lord Cottesloe and many charities to help our cause."

Architects Forrest and Barber were commissioned to design the new club house, completed in 1970. The building has a strong modernist aesthetic, particularly visibly when seen from the South side of the river, characteristic of the architects’ previous projects which include the Harrison Gibson furniture showroom in Ilford, East London.

== Activities ==
The club provides rowing and sculling for adult, adult beginner, junior, masters (mature categories). It has events for recreational and competitive sides of the sport.

The club house marks the finish of the annual Great River Race.

In the 2026 season alone, the club has 11 confirmed wins in 6 regattas, with many more second and third places, and multiple finalists. The club has, at the top level, produced and enhanced international oarsmen and oarswomen: a few members of the club have represented Great Britain in the Olympic Games and World Championships in this period.

== Competition history ==
The club has a long rowing tradition and many of its members are winners of the Doggett's Coat and Badge, the world's oldest annual sporting event, raced every year since 1715 in single sculls from London Bridge to Chelsea. In total the club has over 50 winners including some current and former international rowers. The club's most recent winners are George Gilbert, who won the race in 2022, and Coran Cherry, who won the race in 2025. In 1962 the club recorded its first win of the Wingfield Sculls, one of Britain's premier sculling events, by Charlie Dearsley; from 1968 Kenny Dwan recorded a further five consecutive wins and again in 1975, which is the most wins by any person since 1926. The club has produced numerous international rowers and scullers including Kenny Dwan, who represented Great Britain at the 1968 and 1972 Olympic Games, and Mark Hunter, who won gold at the 2008 Beijing Olympics and silver at the 2012 London Olympics in the lightweight double sculls alongside Zac Purchase. Hunter started his rowing career at PBDRC at the age of 14, having been introduced to the sport by his father.

In 1995 and 1996, juniors from the club (in a composite quad with the Windsor Boys' School) won the Fawley Challenge Cup at Henley Regatta.

In 2011, Ralph Humphrey and Robert Milligan's double won the World Masters in Poznan, Poland, the Britain Masters and the Henley Masters Veterans. More recently, in June 2025, Milligan won six gold medals at the Euro Masters Regatta in Bled, Slovenia.

Year	Competition	Division	Winners
1966	Henley Royal Regatta	Silver Goblets & Nickalls' Challenge Cup, II-	R Easterling and J T McCarthy (runners-up)
1968	Henley Royal Regatta	Diamond Challenge Sculls, M1x	Kenny Dwan (runner-up)
1968	Wingfield Sculls	M1x	Kenny Dwan
1968	Summer Olympics, Mexico	M1x	Kenny Dwan (6th overall)
1969	Wingfield Sculls	M1x	Kenny Dwan
1970	Wingfield Sculls	M1x	Kenny Dwan
1971	Wingfield Sculls	M1x	Kenny Dwan
1972	Wingfield Sculls	M1x	Kenny Dwan
1972	Summer Olympics, Munich	M1x	Kenny Dwan (9th overall)
1974	Henley Royal Regatta	Diamond Challenge Sculls, M1x	Kenny Dwan (runner-up)
1975	Wingfield Sculls	M1x	Kenny Dwan
1978	Henley Royal Regatta	Double Sculls Challenge Cup, M2x	MS Spencer and R Prentice (runners-up)
1979	Henley Royal Regatta	Double Sculls Challenge Cup, M2x	Ian Gold (runner up) (in a composite with Bewl Bridge's AC Rudkin)
1995	Henley Royal Regatta	Fawley Challenge Cup, JM4x	in a composite quad with the Windsor Boys' School
1996	Henley Royal Regatta	Fawley Challenge Cup, JM4x	in a composite quad with the Windsor Boys' School
1997	Henley Royal Regatta	Queen Mother Challenge Cup, B4x	(runners-up)
2013	Doggett's Coat and Badge	Professional single sculls	Brice Nathaniel
2014	Doggett's Coat and Badge	Professional single sculls	Harry McCarthy
2016	Marlow Regatta	Masters B/C	Andrea Stock
2016		Novice JW1x	Phoebe O'Hene
2016	Peterborough Spring Regatta	IM3W1x	Beverley Reid
2016		WJ16 1x	Laura Stewart
2016		Masters F 1x	Robert Milligan
2016	Henley Masters Regatta	Masters B 1x	Andrea Stock
2016		Masters C 2x	Ralph Humphrey (in a composite with Medway Town's Shaun Martin)
2016	Euro Masters Regatta, Munich	Masters C mixed 4x	Andrea Stock, Beverley Reid and Ralph Humphrey (in a composite with Medway Town's Shaun Martin)
2016		Masters A 1x	Andrea Stock
2016		Masters B 1x	Andrea Stock
2016		Masters B 2x	Ralph Humphrey (in a composite with Medway Town's Shaun Martin)
2016	World Masters Championships, Copenhagen	Masters F 1x	Robert Milligan
2016		Masters G VIII+	Robert Milligan (in a composite with Ardingly, Quintin and Worcester)
2016		Masters G IV-	Robert Milligan (in a composite with Ardingly)
2016		Masters A 2x	Ralph Humphrey (in a composite with Medway Town's Shaun Martin)
2016	Henley Sculls Head	IM3W 1x	Phoebe O'Herne
2016		IM1W 1x	Andrea Stock
2018	Doggett's Coat and Badge	Professional single sculls	Alfie Anderson
2020	Doggett's Coat and Badge	Professional single sculls	James Berry
2021	Doggett's Coat and Badge	Professional single sculls	Max Carter-Miller
2022	European Masters Regatta, Bled	Masters G 1x	Robert Milligan
2022	World Rowing Masters Regatta, Libourne	Masters C 1x	Dan Bartlett
2022	Doggett's Coat and Badge	Professional single sculls	George Gilbert
2022	Henley Masters Regatta	Masters H 1x	Robert Milligan
2023	Henley Masters Regatta	Masters H 1x	Robert Milligan
2024	Henley Masters Regatta	Masters H 1x	Robert Milligan
2024	Euro Masters Regatta, Munich	Masters H 1x (Trophy)	Robert Milligan
2024		Masters H 4x	Robert Milligan (in a composite with Upper Thames RC)
2024		Masters G 1x	Robert Milligan
2024	Pairs Head of the River Race	Op Masters B 2x	Ben Gliniecki and Tommy Randall
2025	Doggett's Coat and Badge	Professional single sculls	Coran Cherry
2025	Euro Masters Regatta, Bled	Masters I 4x	Robert Milligan (in a composite with Upper Thames' Rod Stewart and Lee Brown, and Quintin's Tom Bishop)
2025		Masters H 1x (Trophy, fastest overall time)	Robert Milligan
2025		Masters H 4x	Robert Milligan (in the same composite as above)
2025		Masters G 1x	Robert Milligan
2025		Masters H 2x	Robert Milligan (in a composite)
2025	World Rowing Masters Championships, Banyoles	Masters H 2x	Robert Milligan (in a composite with Mossman, Sydney RC, Australia)
2025		Masters I 4x	Robert Milligan
2025		Masters H 1x	Robert Milligan
2025		Masters H 4-	Robert Milligan
2025		Masters G 1x	Robert Milligan
2025		Masters H 8+	Robert Milligan
2026	British Masters, Nottingham	Women's Masters 1x	Andrea Stock
2026	Henley Masters Regatta	Open Masters H 4x	Robert Milligan (in a composite with Upper Thames and Quintin)

=== British champions ===
Year	Winning crew/s
1972	Men 1x
1973	Men 1x
1974	Men 1x, Men J16 1x
1975	Men 1x
1977	Men 2x, Men J18 1x
1980	Men J18 4x
1982	Men J18 1x
1983	Men J18 1x
1994	Men J16 1x
1997	Men 4x
2011	Open J17 1x

== See also ==
- Rowing on the River Thames
- Doggett's Coat and Badge
- Wingfield Sculls
- Henley Royal Regatta
- Isle of Dogs
- Great River Race
- Kenny Dwan
- Mark Hunter (rower)
- List of oldest rowing clubs in the world
