= Amy Gentry =

Rower and secretary

Amy Gentry OBE

Personal information
- Nationality: English
- Born: 26 July 1903 Barnes
- Died: 11 June 1976 (aged 72) Stanwell
- Website: WLARC

Sport
- Country: United Kingdom
- Sport: Rowing
- Events: single scull double scull four eight

Amy Constance Gentry OBE (26 July 1903 – 11 June 1976) was a pioneer of women's rowing in England, starting at Weybridge Rowing Club where she founded a ladies section in 1920. She competed in a variety of styles and was the undefeated champion of the women's single scull from 1932 to 1934. She then became a successful administrator of the sport.

During World War II, she was the secretary of the famous Vickers engineer, Barnes Wallis, and assisted him with his experiments to develop a bouncing bomb to destroy German dams.

== Early life ==
Gentry was born in Barnes, close to the River Thames, and participated in water sports when young, racing dinghies at the age of six. In 1919, Weybridge Rowing Club organised celebrations of the Allied victory in the First World War and she took part in a race of ladies' fours. This was successful and she then helped establish the club's ladies' section in 1920. In 1925, she was a member of a club team which defeated crews from France, Belgium, and the Netherlands at a royal charity regatta in Brussels. She founded a separate Weybridge ladies' rowing club in 1926 and later became its chair – a position she retained until her death.

== Championships and honours ==
She rowed with her brother Frank in mixed double sculling events and they won three consecutive championships from 1924 to 1926. In 1927, she took part in the first Women's Eights Head of the River Race which her Weybridge ladies club boat won. She went on to become British single sculls champion in 1932, 1933, and 1934, and retired undefeated. She also helped administer the sport of rowing, acting as secretary of the Women's Amateur Rowing Association between 1926 and 1938, then chairing it and its successor body, the women's committee of the Amateur Rowing Association, until retiring in 1968. In 1960, she persuaded the International Rowing Federation to hold its women's European championships in London. She was appointed to the Order of the British Empire for services to rowing in 1969.

== World War II ==
The bouncing bomb concept for destroying dams

During World War II, she worked at Vickers Armstrong as secretary for Barnes Wallis and assisted him with his famous experiments to make a bouncing bomb to destroy German dams. Wallis would catapult wooden models across the water, which Gentry would then row out to retrieve. She rowed him out on Silvermere lake and took charge to ensure that they did not capsize, saying "Sit down Wallis! You'll have us both in the water, and I'm in charge of this boat!".

== Death ==
She died in hospital at Stanwell in 1976 at the age of 72. She was unmarried and left no children.
