= Silvermere =

Country estate and lake in Surrey, England

- Silvermere, looking east

- Location within Surrey
- Location: Surrey
- Coordinates: 51°20′09″N 0°27′03″W
- Type: Mere
- Basin countries: United Kingdom
- Surface area: 10 acres (4.0 ha)

One of the ancient British burial urns was preserved and displayed at Atkinson's house where it was still to be found until 1948 when it was donated to the Charterhouse School museum by old boy, Mr Seth Smith.

Experiments on the bouncing bomb concept for destroying dams were conducted on the mere.

Silvermere is an estate in Surrey, England named after its mere – a shallow lake of about ten acres which has a silvery appearance when seen from the surrounding slopes. The estate was created in the 19th century for the rich architect, William Atkinson, and subsequently became the home of the Seth Smith family, who had also become wealthy from property development. An ancient British burial mound was found on the land and the Silvermere Urn was found within. During World War II, the mere was used for experiments to develop and test the bouncing bomb. The estate is now a golf course and the final green is on an island in the mere.

== Atkinson family ==
It was part of the estate of the Oatlands Palace until 1830, when the architect William Atkinson bought 170 acres of land with the lake and erected a house there. He lived there for ten years until his death, when he was succeeded by his son Henry.

The land had been mostly undeveloped heath, but Atkinson was interested in horticulture. He planted a large variety of rare plants and trees, including a comprehensive collection of pines which was one of the finest in England. The farmhouse of the estate was made of peat turf and the dairy had a similar turf roof which worked well to keep it cool.

== The Silvermere Urn ==
To construct Atkinson's house, earth was removed and this was found to be a burial mound. Three burial urns were found containing bones and charcoal. They were earthenware made of light clay and about eighteen inches tall. They seemed to be ancient British of a similar antiquity to the Iron Age settlement found on nearby St George's Hill, labelled among two other knolls south of the Thames which had borne celtic artefacts at various times in the 17th to 19th centuries as Caesar's Camp.

== Seth-Smith family ==
Charles Edward Seth-Smith (1822 -1900 ) was the first member of the family to own & reside at Silvermere. He was the eldest son of Seth Smith, a well known & prosperous property developer, who built large proportions of Belgravia & Mayfair in the 1830s, and is famous for the pantechnicon, a building which the name of the van derives from.

The estate was passed down to various members of the Seth-Smith family.

== Bouncing bombs ==
During the Second World War, the estate was owned by the Seth-Smith family which had made a fortune developing Belgravia. Vickers staff from Weybridge were dispersed to this area and facilities for developing the bouncing bomb were based nearby in Foxwarren Park. In 1942, Barnes Wallis and his secretary, rowing champion Amy Gentry, rowed out onto the lake where Wallis fired differently-shaped models from a catapult and Gentry then rowed to retrieve them. Later, in 1943, George Edwards, the manager of the Experimental department used the lake to demonstrate the mechanism for spinning and releasing the bombs. Lady Seth Smith was told that the project was secret and was quite agreeable about this activity, "Anything to do with beating the Germans, me boy, you can have, but don't make much noise while you are doing it."

== Golf course ==
The estate is now a golf club with associated leisure facilities. The course opened in 1976 and is of par 71 difficulty. The 17th and 18th holes include shots across the lake and the green for the 18th hole is a small island. The Inn on the Lake is Silvermere's bar and bistro and holds events such as conferences and weddings throughout the year.
