= Warwick Boat Club =

British rowing club

- Emblem: dark blue: a chained and muzzled, standing bear pawing a bear-baiting tree (see superstition/custom of chains at heraldic beast)
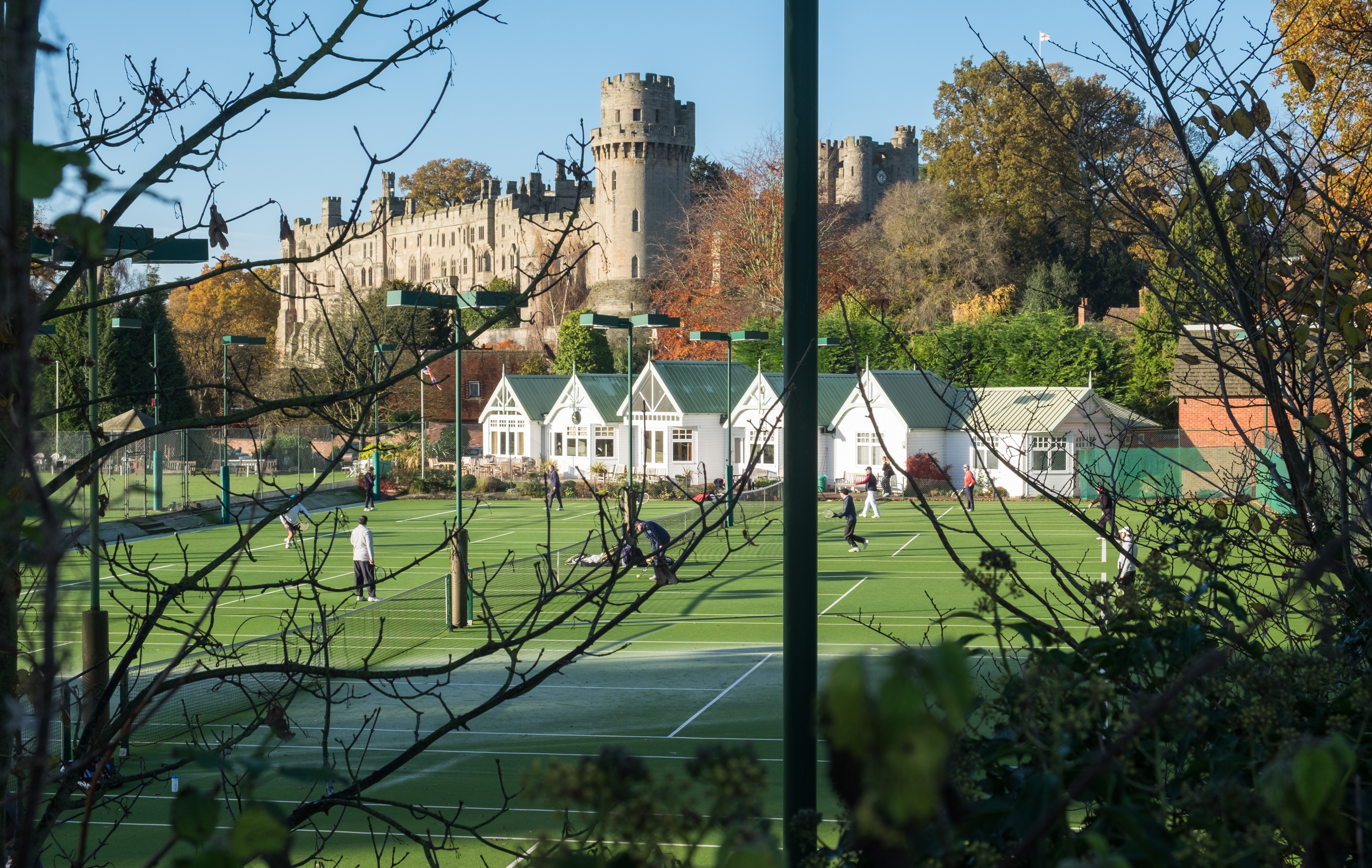

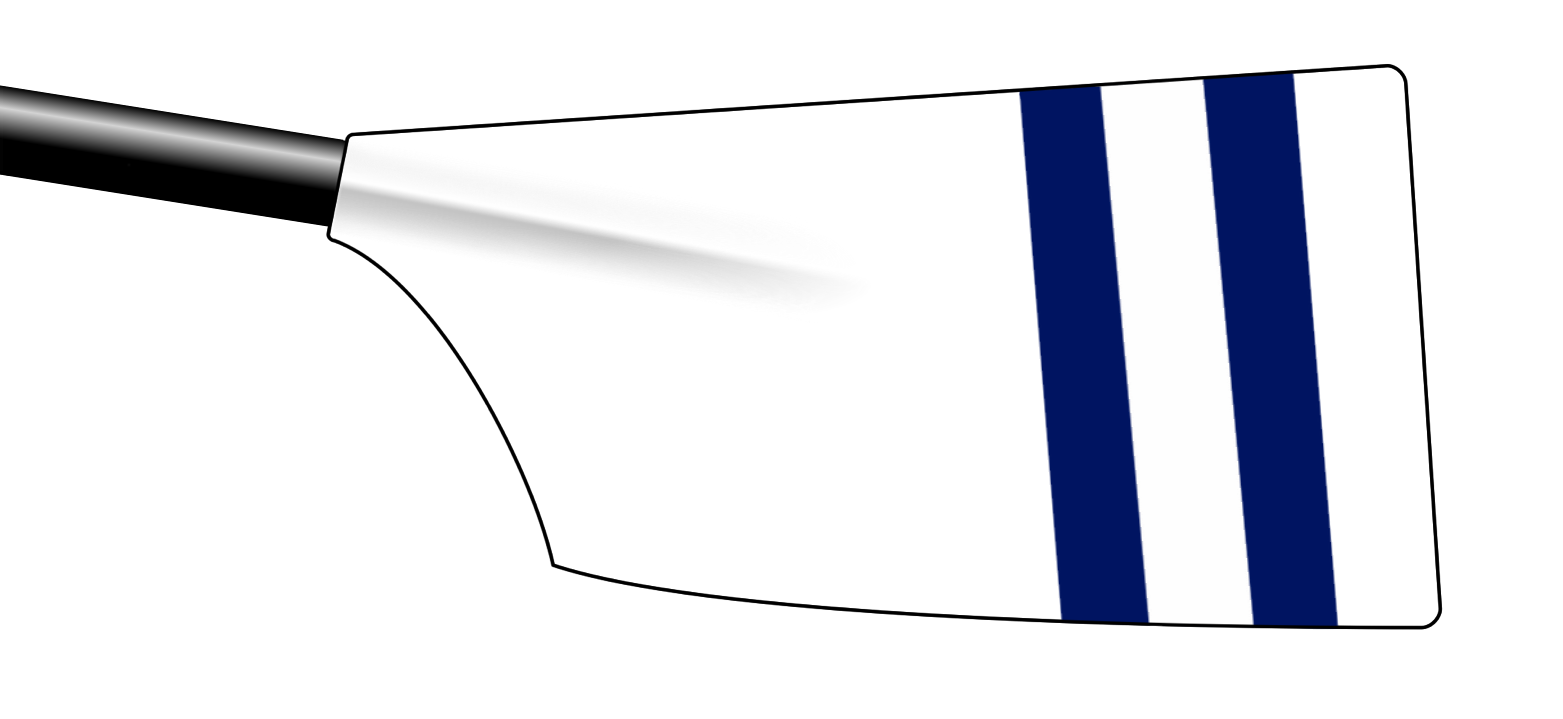
- Location: 33 Mill St, Warwick, Warwick, Warwickshire, England
- Coordinates: 52.2801°N 1.584°W
- Home water: River Avon, Warwickshire
- Founded: 1861
- Affiliations: British Rowing (boat code: WAR)
- Website: warwickboatclub.co.uk

Events
- Warwick Regatta

Warwick Boat Club is a rowing club on the River Avon. Unusually it includes separate "sections" and good grounds for tennis, squash and bowls, and is affiliated to British Rowing. It has social events with catering, live bands, and barbeques on the banks of the river.

The club operates according to its values: progressive; positive; inclusive; safe; sustainable and always acting with integrity, and so attracts members from Warwick, Leamington, Stratford-upon-Avon, Solihull, Banbury, Coventry and surrounding areas.

== History ==
The club was founded in 1861 by a few young gentlemen with the first president being R. C. Heath. The club purchased its first boat, a four-oar racing gig, from Salters in Oxford.

Its club/boat houses were upgraded by rebuilding in 2013.
