= Eton College Boat Club =

British rowing club

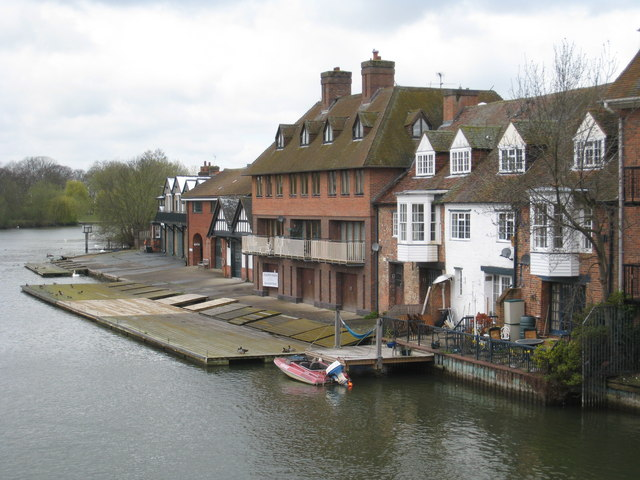

- Location: Eton College, Windsor and Eton College Rowing Centre, Dorney Lake
- Coordinates: 51.487959°N 0.650532°W
- Founded: 1840
- Affiliations: British Rowing boat code - ETN
- Website: www.etonrowing.org.uk

Eton College Boat Club is a rowing club based on the River Thames, at Eton College, Windsor and at the Eton Rowing Centre on Dorney Lake.

== History ==
The Club belongs to Eton College and was founded in 1840 although there are earlier references to rowing at the college (as early as 1791). In 1818, Eton challenged Westminster to a race and in 1829, a race actually took place. This race was known as 'The Challenge'. This race was reinitiated in 2019. The college has a significant record of producing a number of junior national champions and regatta champions and has won the Schools' Head of the River Race a record 14 times, the Queen Mother Challenge Cup at the National Schools' Regatta a record 20 times and the Princess Elizabeth Challenge Cup at the Henley Royal Regatta a record 15 times. Eton has also won the Ladies' Challenge Plate 24 times and the Visitors' Challenge Cup once.

Former pupils known as Old Etonians have their own rowing club called the Eton Vikings Club and include Matthew Pinsent, Constantine Louloudis and Ed Coode.

=== Coaching ===
Pupil-coaches were a fundamental part of the rowing structure at Eton College Boat Club in the 19th and early 20th centuries. During this period, the coaching of lower boats was predominantly handled by senior students, specifically members of the "Monarch" (the top ten-oared crew) and other senior oarsmen who were often under the general supervision of a master (such as the famous oarsman and Headmaster Dr Warre) or visiting Old Etonians. In 2024, the coaching team, which includes both teaching staff and dedicated, specialized coaches, receives mentorship and training to align with the club's high-performance philosophy. Junior coaches are guided by a Head of Rowing and experienced coaches (such as previous Henley-winning coaches) to ensure high-quality technical instruction in both rowing and sculling.

== Honours ==
=== British champions ===
Year	Winning crew
1972	Men J18 8+
1973	Men J18 2-, Men J18 4-, Men J18 8+
1974	Men J18 8+
1975	MJ18 4x
1976	Men J18 1x
1977	Men J18 2+, Men J18 8+, Men J16 8+
1978	Men J18 4-, Men J18 4+
1982	Victor Ludorum, Men J18 4+, Men J16 2+, Men J16 8+
1985	Men J18 4+
1986	Men J16 2-, Men J16 4+, Men J16 8+
1987	Men J16 8+
1988	Men J16 2+, Men J16 8+
1989	Men J18 8+
1991	Men J16 8+
1993	Men J18 8+, Men J16 4+, Men J16 4-
1994	Men J18 8+
1996	Men J16 8+
1997	Men J16 4-, Men J16 8
1998	Men J16 4-, Men J16 8
2000	Men J18 2-
2012	Open J18 2-

Key= J junior, 2, 4, 8 crew size, 18, 16, 15, 14 age group, x sculls, - coxless, + coxed

=== National Schools' Regatta ===
Year	Winning crew
1972	Queen Mother Challenge Cup
1973	Queen Mother Challenge Cup
1974	Queen Mother Challenge Cup
1977	Queen Mother Challenge Cup
1978	Queen Mother Challenge Cup
1983	Queen Mother Challenge Cup
1989	Queen Mother Challenge Cup
1990	Queen Mother Challenge Cup
1991	Queen Mother Challenge Cup
1994	Queen Mother Challenge Cup
1995	Queen Mother Challenge Cup
1996	Queen Mother Challenge Cup
1998	Queen Mother Challenge Cup
2007	Queen Mother Challenge Cup
2009	Queen Mother Challenge Cup
2010	Queen Mother Challenge Cup
2011	Queen Mother Challenge Cup
2021	Queen Mother Challenge Cup
2022	Queen Mother Challenge Cup

=== Henley Royal Regatta ===
Year	Winning crew
1864	Ladies' Challenge Plate
1866	Ladies' Challenge Plate, Town Challenge Cup (men)
1867	Ladies' Challenge Plate, Town Challenge Cup (men)
1868	Ladies' Challenge Plate
1869	Ladies' Challenge Plate, Town Challenge Cup (men)
1870	Ladies' Challenge Plate, Town Challenge Cup (men)
1882	Ladies' Challenge Plate
1884	Ladies' Challenge Plate
1885	Ladies' Challenge Plate
1893	Ladies' Challenge Plate
1893	Ladies' Challenge Plate
1894	Ladies' Challenge Plate
1895	Ladies' Challenge Plate
1896	Ladies' Challenge Plate
1897	Ladies' Challenge Plate
1898	Ladies' Challenge Plate
1899	Ladies' Challenge Plate
1904	Ladies' Challenge Plate
1905	Ladies' Challenge Plate
1910	Ladies' Challenge Plate
1911	Ladies' Challenge Plate
1912	Ladies' Challenge Plate
1921	Ladies' Challenge Plate
1948	Ladies' Challenge Plate
1956	Princess Elizabeth Challenge Cup
1960	Ladies' Challenge Plate
1967	Princess Elizabeth Challenge Cup
1969	Visitors' Challenge Cup
1978	Princess Elizabeth Challenge Cup
1982	Princess Elizabeth Challenge Cup
1983	Princess Elizabeth Challenge Cup
1990	Princess Elizabeth Challenge Cup
1991	Princess Elizabeth Challenge Cup
1995	Princess Elizabeth Challenge Cup
2005	Princess Elizabeth Challenge Cup
2009	Princess Elizabeth Challenge Cup
2010	Princess Elizabeth Challenge Cup
2014	Princess Elizabeth Challenge Cup
2016	Princess Elizabeth Challenge Cup
2019	Princess Elizabeth Challenge Cup
2021	Princess Elizabeth Challenge Cup

=== Schools' Head of the River Race ===
Year	Winning crew
1955	J18 eights
1959	J18 eights
1972	J18 eights
1973	J18 eights
1974	J18 eights
1978	J18 eights
1979	J18 eights
1990	J18 eights
1991	J18 eights
1992	J18 eights
1995	J18 eights
2005	J18 eights
2009	J18 eights
2010	J18 eights
