= Weybridge Rowing Club =

British rowing club

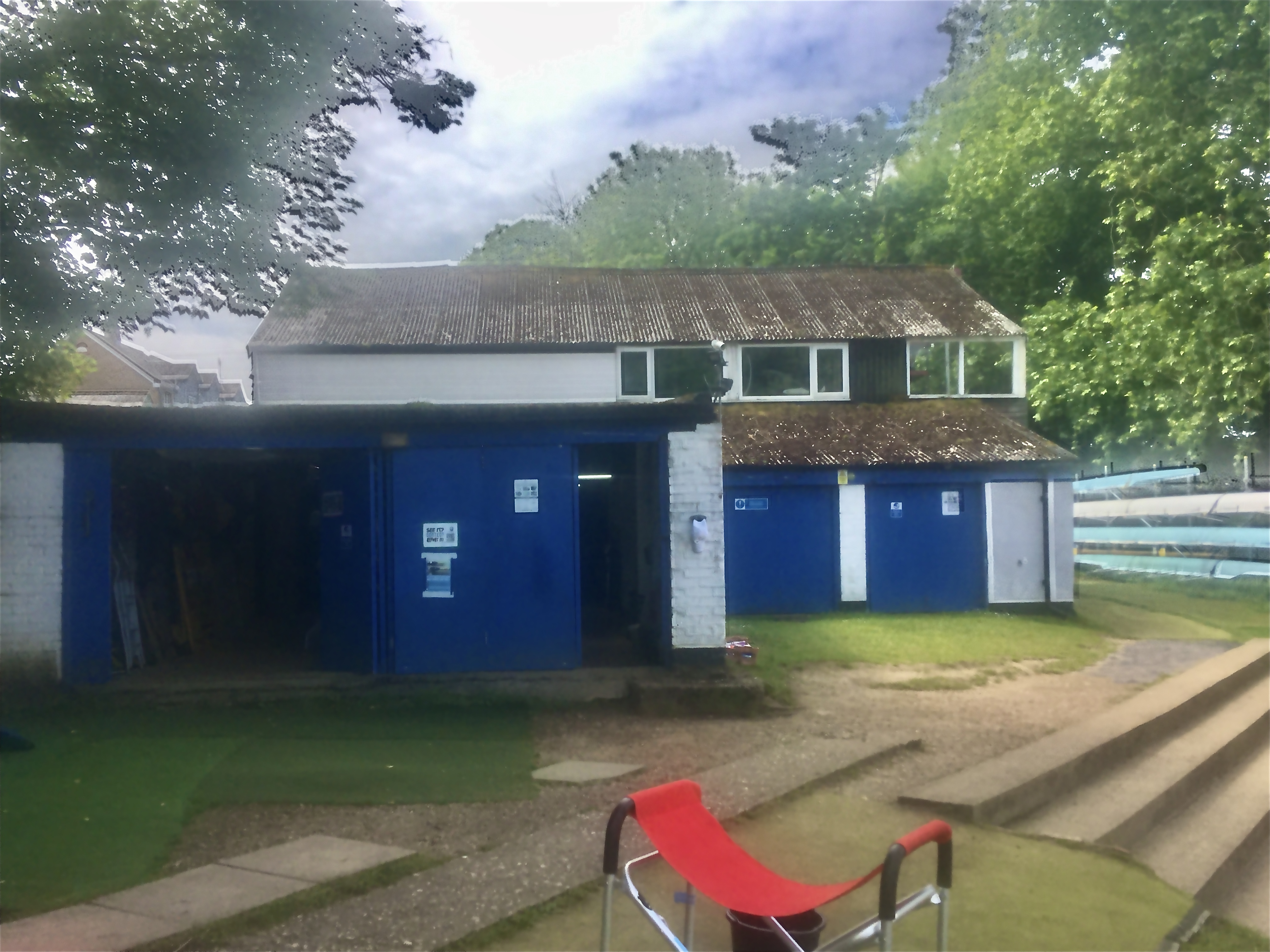

- Motto: Possunt quia posse videntur; They can because they think they can
- Location: Weybridge, (Note: Postally, and as to the main transport link. As to borough the fact the land is still part of Addlestone (thus ignoring the expanded but minor left off-take or mouth of the combined Wey/Wey Navigation) is borne out: the borough is Runnymede and not Elmbridge.) Surrey, England
- Coordinates: 51° 22′ 47″ N, 0° 27′ 27″ W
- Home water: Sunbury Lock, River Thames
- Founded: 1881
- Membership: 180
- Affiliations: British Rowing boat and crew member code: WEY
- Website: weybridgerowing.club

Events
- Ordered by usual month: Weybridge Winter Head (January); Hyne Cup (local match of rowing clubs on the reach, February); Walton & Weybridge Regatta (June); Weybridge Community Regatta (open to local businesses, August); Weybridge Silver Sculls (October)

Notable members
- George Cotterill; Leif Mills; Matthew Tarrant

Weybridge Rowing Club, founded in 1881, is a rowing club by the Thames in England, on the Surrey bank. The club organises head races, notably the Weybridge Silver Sculls which has had Olympian winners and co-organises a May/June regatta. It consists of a wide range of members: juniors, novices, seniors, masters (veterans) – these include many past and present champions.

It fronts the minor, upper weir stream associated with Shepperton Lock on a long, thin island separated by footbridge and narrow canal from the rest of Whittet's Ait, Weybridge. The local stretch of Thames – to Sunbury Lock – is roughly 5 km from topmost weir to bottommost weir and is shared with seven other well-established watersports clubs: the rowing clubs of Walton, Saint George's College, Weyfarers, Weybridge Ladies, Thames Valley Skiff Club, Elmbridge Canoe Club and Desborough Sailing Club.

== History ==
In 1881 Weybridge Rowing Club started life as the local "tradesmen's" rowing club, as opposed to clubs for gentlemen or as latterly called "certified amateur's" such as Walton's begun in 1927.

In 1919 the club joined National Amateur Rowing Association (NARA) which was set up as a rival to the ARA. The ARA for several decades forbade manual workers to compete in its regattas.

After the 1914–18 war, women enjoyed greater freedom and were made more welcome in many sports, the club included a women's event in their "Peace" regatta and formed a women's section, captained by Amy Gentry.

In 1924 a coxed four from the club represented Great Britain in the 1924 Summer Olympics in Paris – V.J. Boveington (stroke), E.W. Hann, J.H. Townend, B.C. Croucher and cox H.L. Barnsley. They narrowly missed bronze and won many regattas at home.

In 1926 Amy Gentry founds Weybridge Ladies Amateur Rowing Club, the then women's section of the club, which moves a few hundred metres downriver to its base.

In 1920 Weybridge Regatta (continued as Walton & Weybridge Regatta) is founded, as today held on the Walton Mile. The regatta was known as NARA's "Henley" and attracted large crowds for the rowing and following fireworks. Weybridge was one of the few clubs on the Thames to remain open during the Second World War when the regatta was suspended.

In 1956 the Weybridge Silver Sculls, the oldest sculling head on the non-tidal Thames began – held in October each year. It soon regularly attracted over 500 entries and attracts many hundreds today. The famous trophy was made by the event's founder, "Dickie" Bird.

Successful juniors of the 1960s to 1980s included J Crozier, C Roberts, C Fuller, Peter Levy, Mike Webb, Ian Shore, Jeff Hunt, Paul Wensley, Duncan Nicholl and Jonathan Hulls, for Great Britain in international competitions. Today about one third of the active members are juniors — more if local school groups in Wey to Row and other events are counted.

Re-emergence of women at the club began when Carol Adamson became its first female captain in 1990. Their leading eight came 8th in the Women's Head of the River in 1993 in a field open category of about 150 and reached the finals of Club Eights at Women's Henley in 1992 and 1993. Across all boat types (singles to eights) the women in each subsequent decade have won a larger haul of outright wins than the club's men, bucking the trend of previous decades. Across various age categories they won ten events in 2018 across the British Masters Championships and European Masters Regatta. This places the multi-generational women's age-28-plus cohort on an alike footing to Molesey, Thames and London.

In 1991 Weybridge Veterans Head was founded, held each March. It hosts eights and fours, and has now expanded to juniors.

== Sister club ==
In 2000 a still well-linked sister club, Weyfarers, took on its own outings, racks and hut. It is a community of rowers who want to row for enjoyment and to keep fit, with no or little interest in racing. In 2003 Weyfarers hosted the FISA Recreational Rowing Tour on the Thames of 95 participants from 15 countries rowing from Oxford to Putney, London in 18 boats. This raised the profile of touring rowing in the UK.

== Accreditation ==
Weybridge Rowing Club was awarded "Clubmark" status, Sport England's quality certification which confirms the club's excellent standard of care and coaching for juniors.

== Courses ==
In 2007 Weybridge Rowing Club Junior Squad launched its annual 'WEY To Row' Junior Courses in the Summer Holidays, led by the main coaches and ex-Weybridge juniors, Chris Jones and Jack Percival.

== Membership ==
Weybridge is a well established club and has experienced coaches and a community atmosphere. Currently there are a variety of different ages and abilities of rowers from twelve upwards. They regularly race and train together as well as organising training outings and social events. Seniors (nationally defined as 18 plus with no upper limit) and Masters (aged 28 plus, at minimum) are the heart of the club, racing through all seasons of the year.

Since 2006 the club has had its Weybridge Rowing Club Junior Squad (WRCjnr) Team led by trained, accredited coaches and volunteers. Proficiency and coaching from a young age are taught which assists with beginner courses regularly. The club has good to excellent boats, competes on membership price accordingly, generous family discount, and has a capital fundraising prize draw/quarterly social subscription club, volunteer coaches, donations and equipment/facilities/events sponsors.

== Honours ==
=== British champions ===
Year	Winning crew/s
1972	Men J18 2x
1975	Men 4x
1977	Men J18 4x
1982	Men J16 1x, Men J14 4x
1991	Men J14 1x
1993	Men J18 2x
1995	Men J18 2x
2021	WJ16 2-

== See also ==
- Rowing on the River Thames
