= Derby Rowing Club =

British rowing club

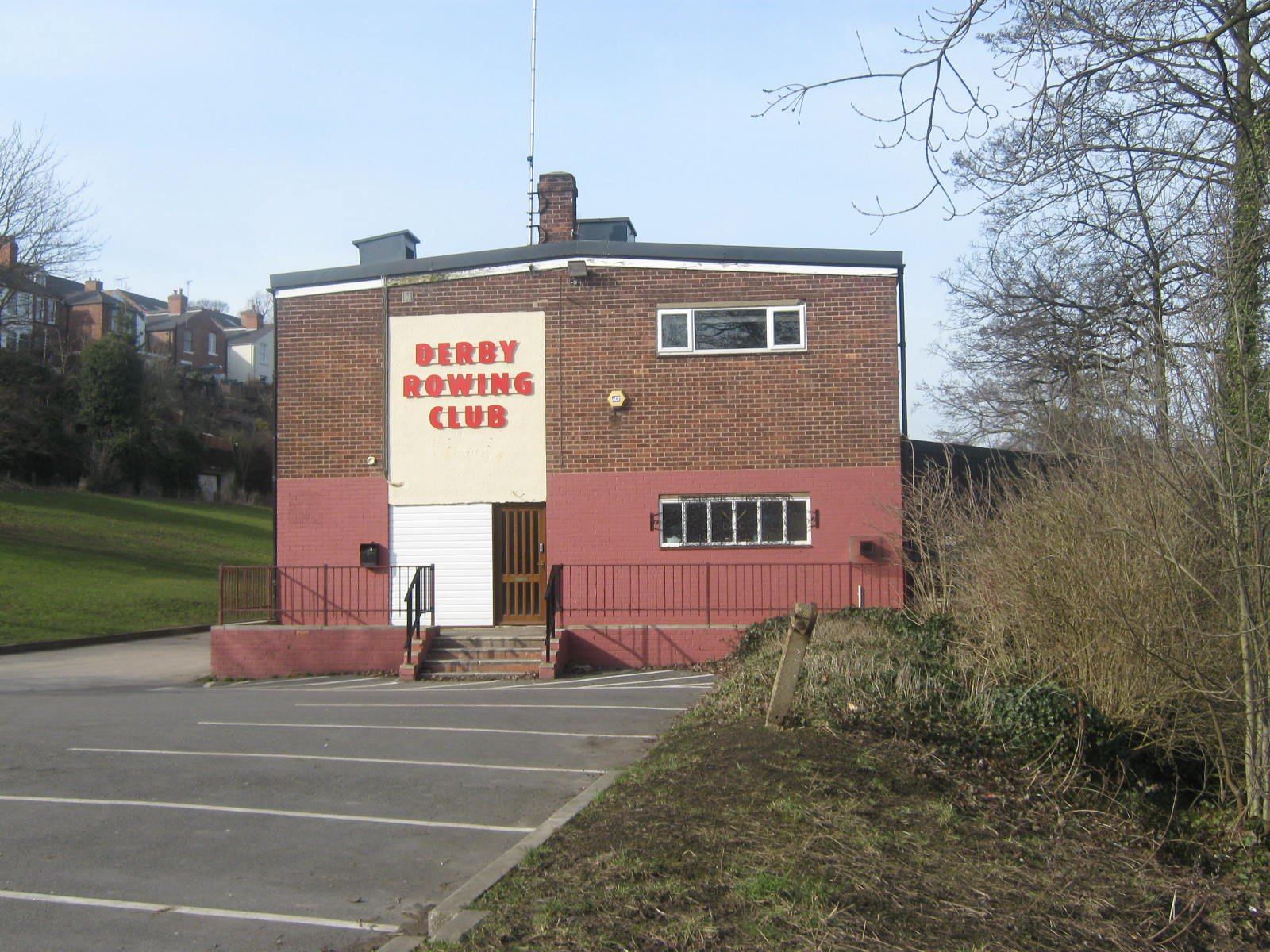

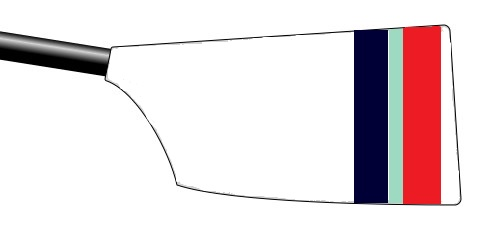
- Location: Darley Grove, Darley Abbey, Derby, Derbyshire, England
- Coordinates: 52.931439°N 1.478389°W
- Founded: 1857
- Affiliations: British Rowing (boat code DBY)
- Website: derbyrowingclub.co.uk

Derby Rowing Club is a rowing club on the River Derwent, based at Darley Grove, Darley Abbey, Derby, Derbyshire, England.

== History ==
Derby Rowing Club was founded by a few friends who wanted to row. They worked for the train network and met in a pub by St. Mary's Bridge each week before deciding that they wanted to start rowing. During November 1857 the Derby Rowing Club was formed with upwards of 20 members. Initially, they rented some land by the river from the rail company and made a small boathouse (which was called the shed). The Derby Regatta was inaugurated in June 1859, with the course set from Darley to St. Mary's Bridge.

At some point after 1878, a boathouse was erected under the Great Northern Railway Bridge at a cost of £5 and the club had headquarters at the Dolphin Inn on Queen Street. Charles Moore joined the club in 1892 and in 1939 was recorded as one of the oldest active rowing club members.

After many years of attempting to build a new boathouse, including plans scrapped due to the outbreak of World War II, the club finally opened a new £6,000 brick building on 26 June 1963.

Over time expansion was needed and one cold winter when the river froze, the clubhouse was moved across to the other side of the river, where it is located today. Throughout the years, many improvements have been made, the latest of which is the addition of an extension which is an erg room and many boats have been added to the fleet. Club members have competed at the highest levels with members racing in the Boat Race, World Championships and at Henley Royal Regatta.

== The Club ==
DRC consists of four core squads; men's, women's, junior's and masters.

All squads are composed of active members who train regularly and go away to race for the club at various events whether that be Henley Royal Regatta, Henley Women's Regatta or some smaller provincial regattas such as Peterborough Summer Regatta. Our squads also cater for members who are perfectly happy to come down to the club on a Saturday or Sunday afternoon to go and have a paddle with their friends.

== University of Derby Rowing Club ==
The University of Derby Rowing Club is affiliated to Derby Rowing Club.

== Honours ==
=== Henley Royal Regatta ===
Year	Winning crew	Athlete(s)
1965	Wyfold Challenge Cup	Phil Phillips, Mervyn Theaker, Andy Bayles, Matthew Cooper

=== Henley Women's Regatta ===
Year	Winning crew	Athlete(s)
1997	Quad Fours	Lisa Crofts, Bev Gough, Amanda Sharman, Julie Pryce

=== University Boat Race ===
Year	University	Athlete
1966	Cambridge University Boat Club	Murray King
2007	Cambridge University Boat Club	Pete Champion
2016	Oxford University Boat Club	George Mckirdy

=== British Champions ===
Year	Winning crew(s)	Athlete(s)
1974	W 2x composite W 4x composite	
1976	W 2-	
1981	M J18 2+ composite W J18 2-	
2008	MasF.4-	Cavell Portman, Fred Hollis, Graham Garner, Peter Holland-Lloyd
2009	MasF.8+	Arnold Cooke, Cavell Portman, Fred Hollis, Graham Garner, John Stoddart, Mervyn Theaker, Peter Holland-Lloyd, Tim Lincoln
2016	MasA.IM3.2x; MasA.4+	Stuart West, Toby Venn; Chris Baillon, Mark Rowbottom, Stuart West, Toby Venn
2017	W Mas Ltw 4x composite	Phoebe Cook
2021	Op Mas.H 4+ W Mas.A 2x	Viv Lewis (cox), Fred Hollis, Peter-Holland Lloyd, Neil Shorrock, Max Hunt; Sarah Rouke, Martha Nutkins
2022	Op MasB 2x Op Mas.H 4+ Op Mas.A 4+ W Mas.A 2-	Matt Ley, Ashley Prestige; Viv Lewis (cox), Fred Hollis, Peter-Holland Lloyd, Neil Shorrock, Max Hunt; James Ryder (cox), Josh Rhodes Hook, Marcus Shreeve, Tom Holmes, Phil Naylor; Sarah Rouke, Martha Nutkins
2024	Op club 2- Op club 4x- Op club 4-	

== Club Committee ==
Year	President	Secretary	Captain
2014	F. Hollis	G. Dean	P. Champion
2015	F. Hollis	G. Dean	P. Champion
2016	F. Hollis	G. Dean	P. Champion
2017	F. Hollis	G. Dean	S. Cook
2018	P. Newbury	G. Dean	T. Hallett
2019	C. Heldreich	M. Hubbard	M. J. Nutkins
2020	C. Heldreich	D. Smith (Hon)	M. J. Nutkins
2021	M. Ley	D. O'Sullivan	M. J. Nutkins
2022	M. Ley	L. Redfern	M. J. Nutkins
