= Cigarette Island Park =

Public park in Surrey, England

Coordinates: 51.4021°N 0.3411°W

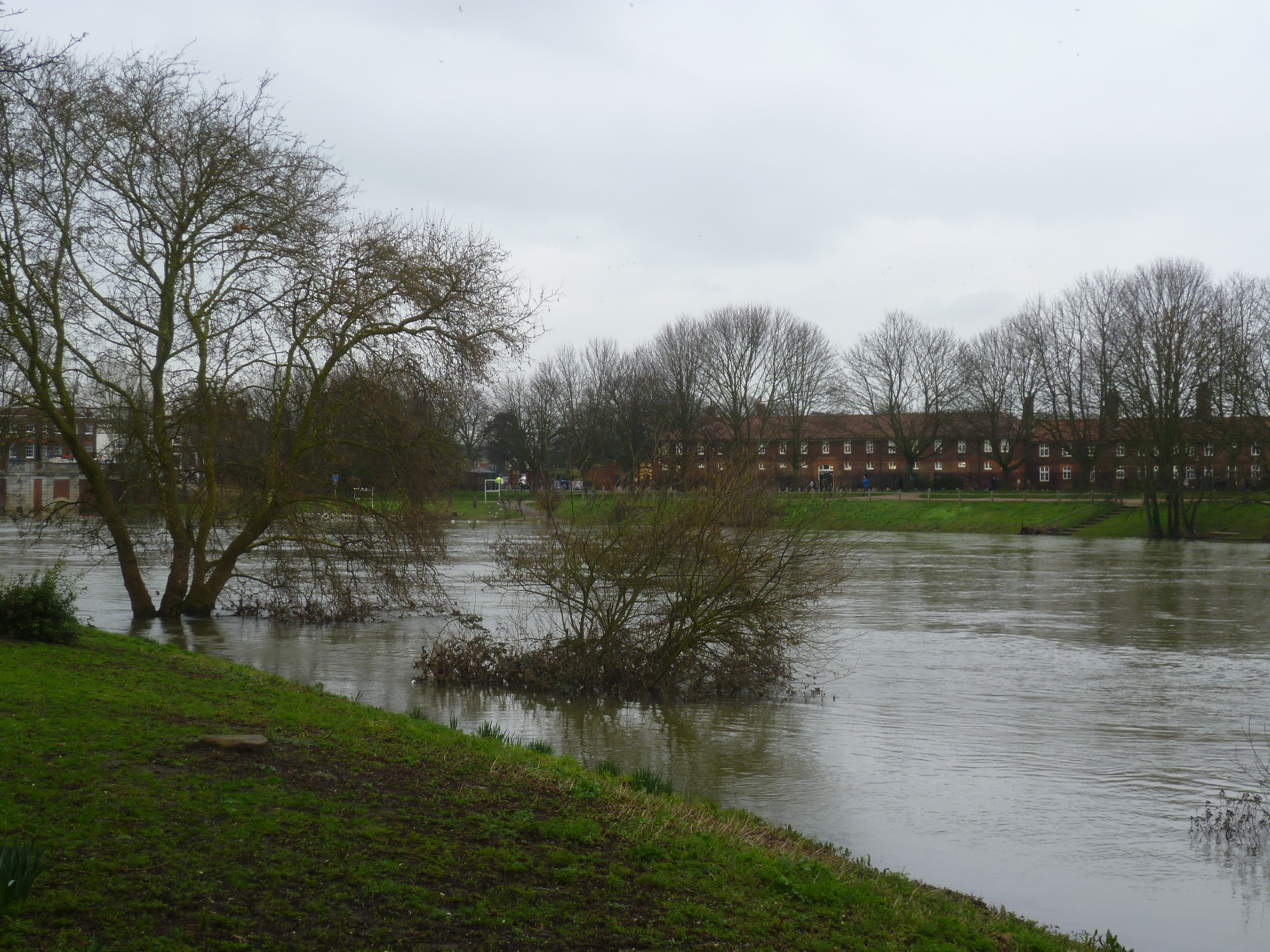
Apartments at Hampton Court Palace seen across the Thames from Cigarette Island Park

Cigarette Island Park is a 5-acre (2.0 ha) public park in East Molesey, in the Borough of Elmbridge, Surrey, close to the border with Greater London and Hampton Court Palace.

Until the 1930s the area was an island at the confluence of the River Mole and the Thames, known as The Sterte as early as the 14th century. In 1843 the island was named Davis's Ait, and a later name of Cigarette Island derived from a houseboat with the name Cigarette which was moored at the site.

Writing in 1843, James Thorne described the location as "a noble one", saying that "From its mouth the Thames, with Hampton Court on the opposite bank, form a picture of surpassing beauty." By the end of the 19th century the site was a popular mooring site for houseboats.

In 1926 council plans were drawn up to convert the island into a public park, in part to curb the "ever-increasing nuisance of caravan dwellers and occupiers of sheds". In the early 1930s the Mole was diverted into the River Ember and the creek was filled in, and the park opened to the public in 1935.

The park is only a short walk away from Hampton Court station.
