= River Ember =

River in north Surrey, England

Coordinates: 51.39272°N 0.35642°W

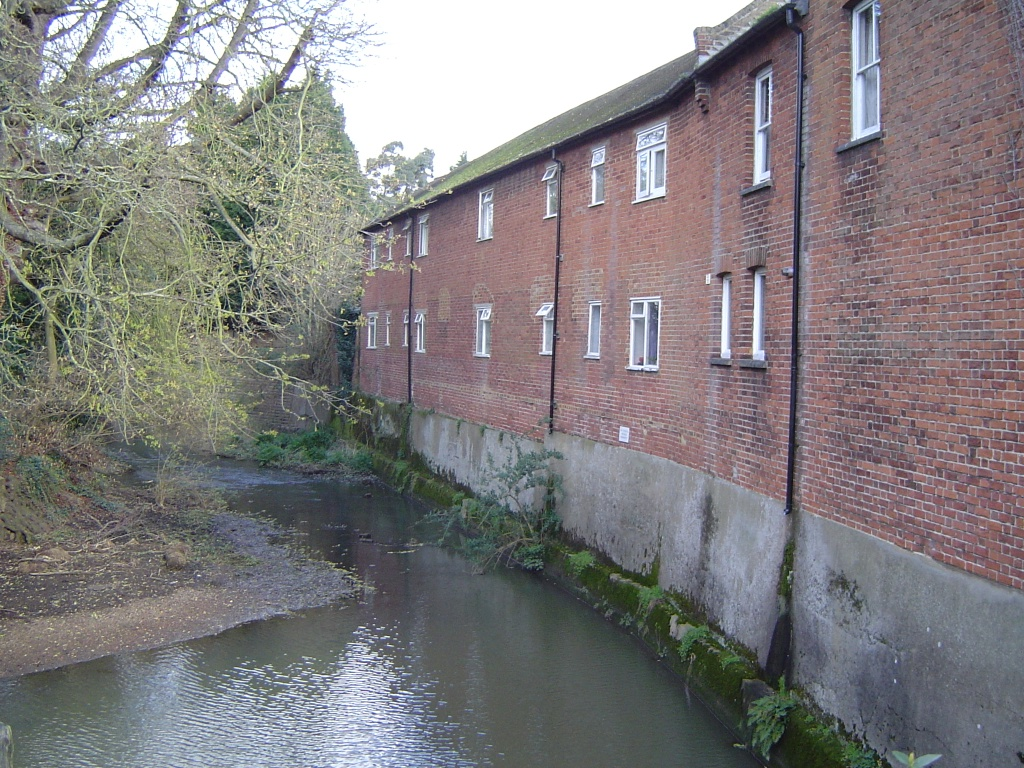
River Ember (preserved upper corollary channel) beside the Ember Mill

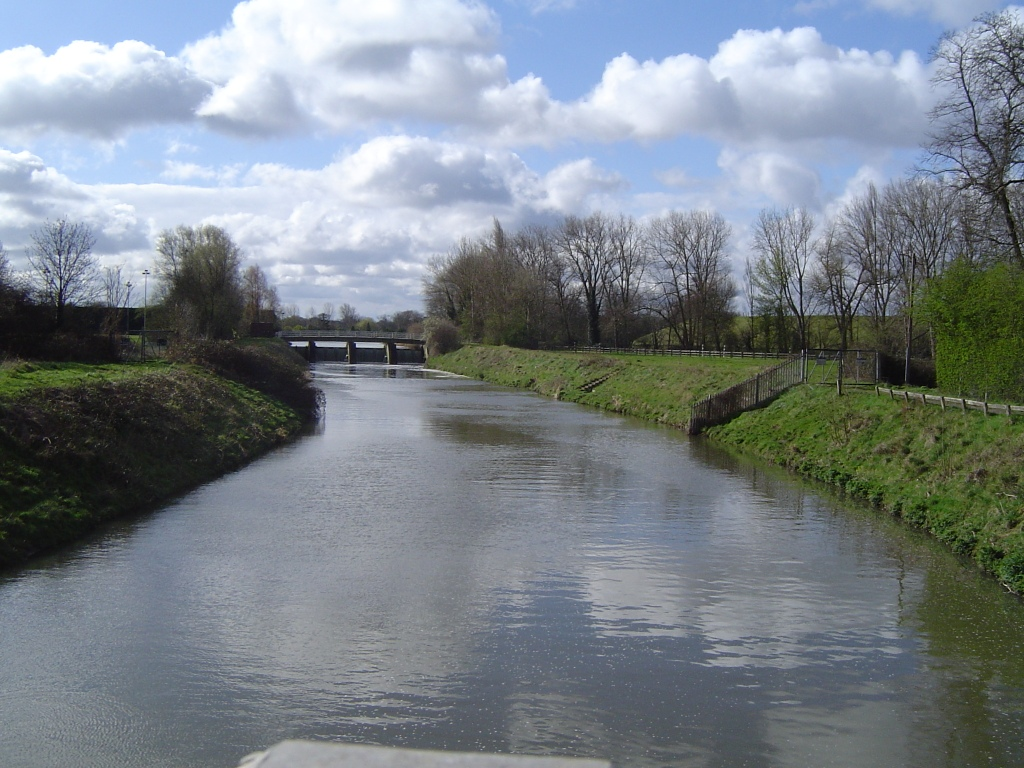
River Ember on new flood management course

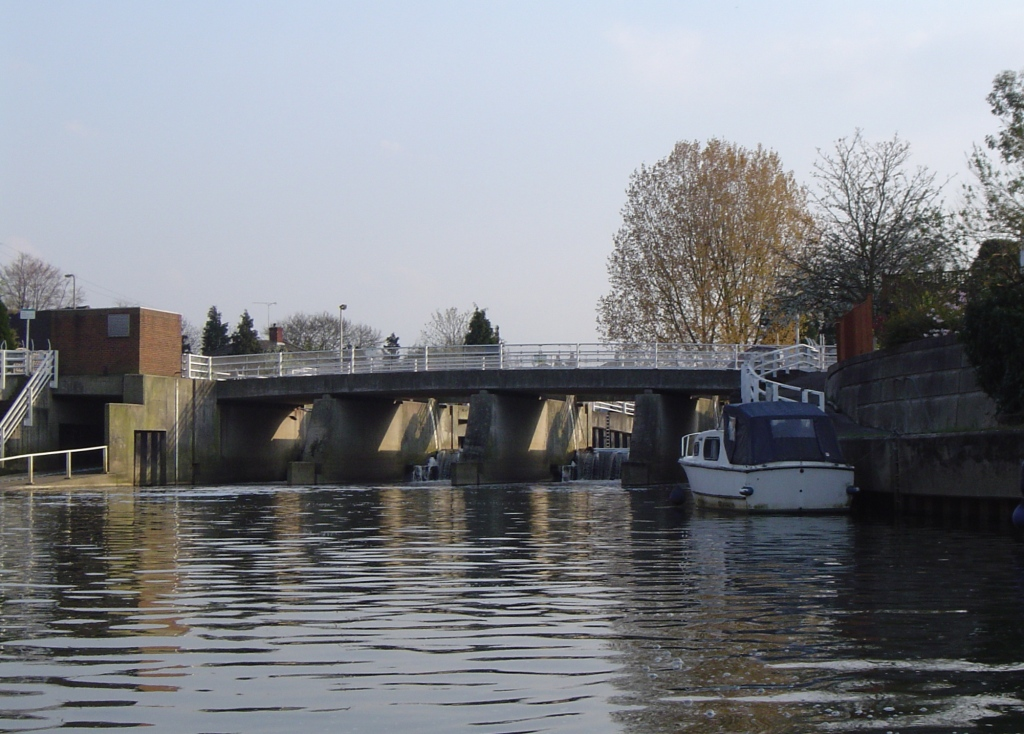
Navigable basin of the Ember before joining the Thames

The River Ember is a short river in the north of Surrey, England — a channel of the River Mole which splits in two south of Island Barn Reservoir, between East Molesey and Lower Green, Esher. The Ember, the larger channel, flows in an easterly and then northerly direction around the reservoir, past part of Esher; the Mole flows around the other side past West Molesey. The two rivers then flow side by side approximately north east and merge 400 metres before joining the River Thames at the eastern end of East Molesey opposite Hampton Court Palace on the south side of the last non-tidal reach, which is above Teddington Lock.

== History ==
The Ember was until the 1930s a distributary. As such the River Mole was similar to two other Thames tributaries, the Colne and the Cherwell, in having more than one channel in its lowest stretch.

The River Mole flowed into the River Thames separately slightly further upstream at the point where Hampton Court Bridge crosses the river, with the land between the Mole and Ember being known as Cigarette Island. However, during the early 1930s, when Hampton Court Way and the bridge were built, the River Mole was redirected to flow into the River Ember forming a widened and straightened channel. There have been further alterations to the courses of these two rivers in a major flood prevention scheme since serious flooding in the area in 1947 and 1968.

Close to its start, Ember Mill stood on an island in the Ember reached from a footbridge at the end of Orchard Lane by Imber Court, East Molesey. The mill was demolished around 1837 and the sluices and waterfalls on either side are all that remain to indicate the site. The mill was originally a corn mill but was later used for manufacturing brass and iron wire. This part of the Ember is bypassed by the new channel of the flood prevention scheme, but a small flow runs into the old course to keep it looking largely as it used to.

== Fishing ==
There is a section of the river at Old Cow Common, East Molesey, where there is free fishing for pike (to 15 pounds), bream, carp, chub, dace, perch, roach, catfish (to 22 lb), tench, bullhead, eel, orfe, goldfish and rudd.

== See also ==
- Tributaries of the River Thames
- List of rivers of England

Next confluence upstream		Next confluence downstream
Longford River, Water Gallery (north)	River Ember & River Mole	The Rythe (south)
