= The Rythe =

River in north Surrey, England

Coordinates: 51.391°N 0.326°W

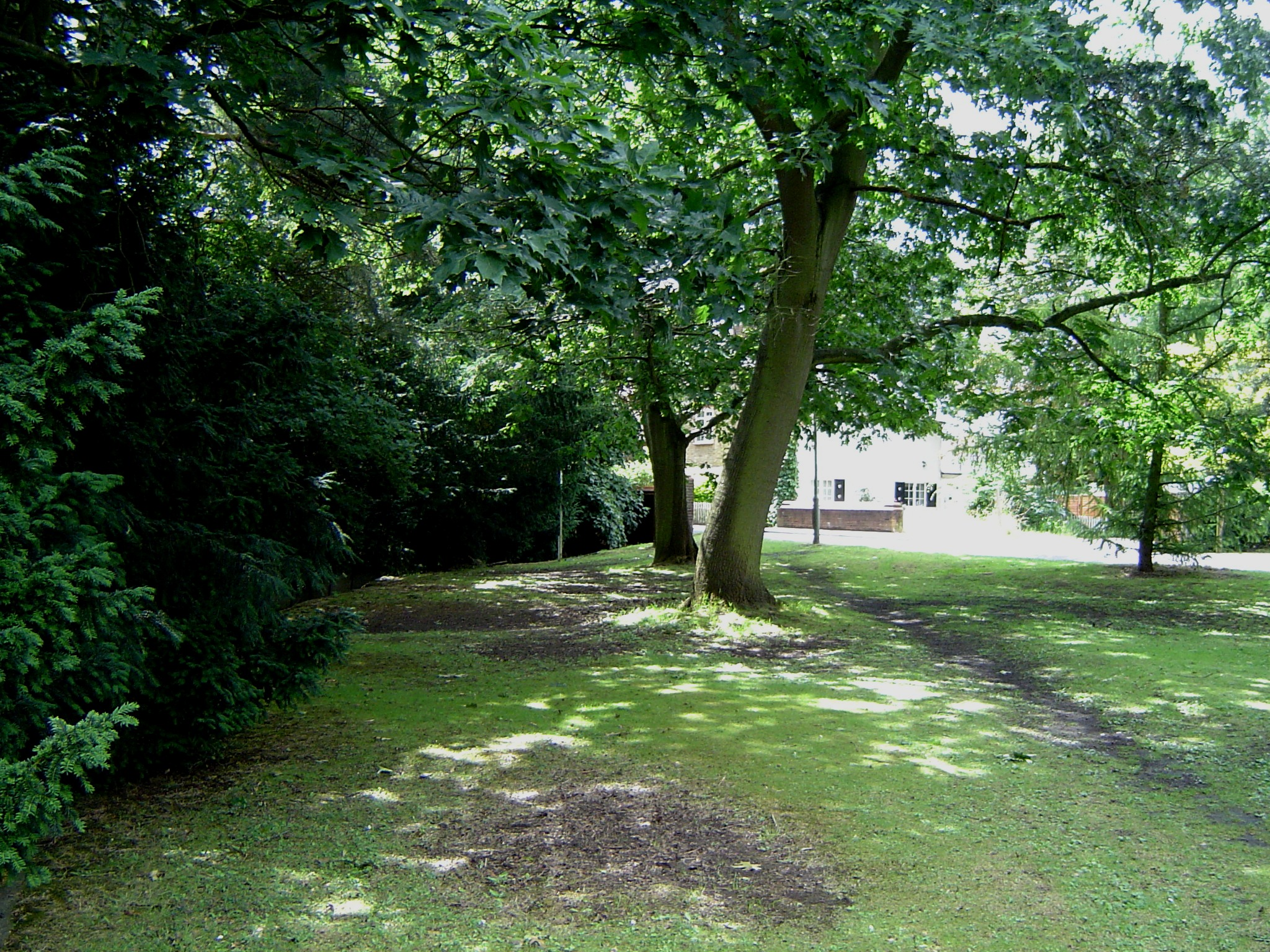
A forked headwater of the Rythe Claygate

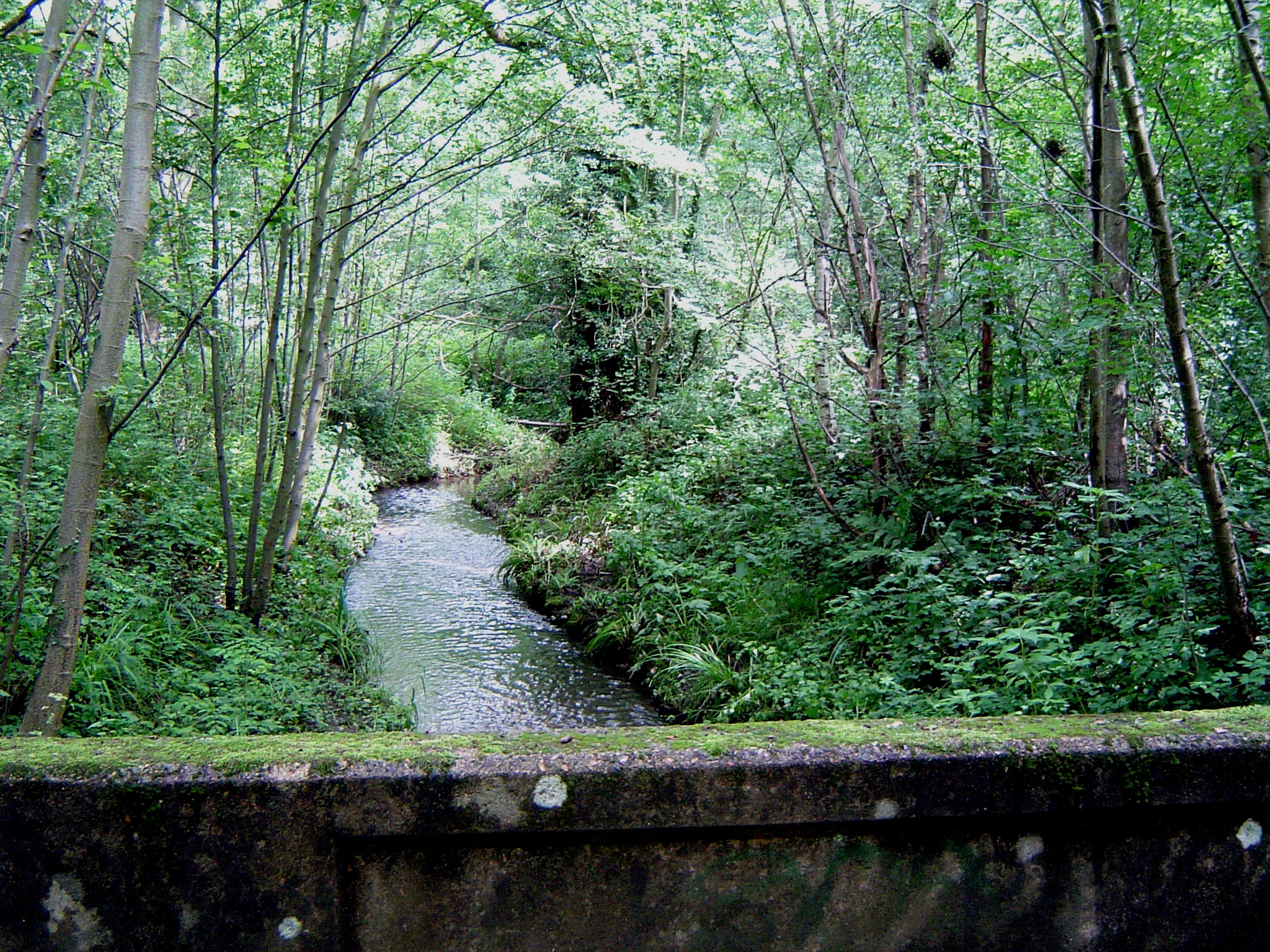
The Rythe in Littleworth Common

The Rythe is a tributary of the River Thames in north Surrey, England. It runs through woodland for approximately half of its course, but is also culverted and passes through suburban gardens. It joins the Thames between Thames Ditton and Long Ditton. Its longest branch is the Arbrook which drains Arbrook Common, a woodland area of Esher Commons.

== Course ==
The Rythe rises at several sources, the furthest being four sources in Prince's Coverts (woodland), all in the parish and ward of Oxshott where on its northern edge it combines to form the Arbrook.

It runs under the six-lane A3 into wooded Arbrook Common there joined by three further headwaters rising in the suburban village of Claygate, immediately to the east (right bank). The Rythe carries on north bounding Littleworth Common and Hinchley Wood to the Scilly Isles roundabout at part of a remnant of the wooded Ditton Marsh, now part of Esher. It then follows the Portsmouth Road east through part of Thames Ditton and alongside the South West Main Line. It receives its shorter east branch (rising in Surbiton Golf Course, Long Ditton) then turns running into the Thames near Ferry Road, 800 metres north.

The Rythe has many clay banks and its lack of depth and width at pinch points has been implicated in flash flooding in gardens and drainage systems, particularly for its mid-course headwaters in Claygate. A flood alleviation scheme was therefore drawn up in 2002 between flood alleviation authorities. Some of its course is owned by landowners. The Rythe discharges into the Thames dividing Thames Ditton from Long Ditton to the east on the reach above Teddington Lock on the north-western border of the county of Surrey with the edge of the administrative county of London. Its lowest section lies in Thames Ditton.

== Water quality ==
The Environment Agency measures the water quality of the river systems in England. Each is given an overall ecological status, which may be one of five levels: high, good, moderate, poor and bad. There are several components that are used to determine this, including biological status, which looks at the quantity and varieties of invertebrates, angiosperms and fish. Chemical status, which compares the concentrations of various chemicals against known safe concentrations, is rated good or fail.

Water quality of the Rythe in 2019:

Section	Ecological Status	Chemical Status	Overall Status	Length	Catchment	Channel
Rythe	Poor	Fail	Poor	5.099 km (3.168 mi)	20.04 km^{2} (7.74 sq mi)	Heavily modified

== See also ==
- Tributaries of the River Thames
- List of rivers of England

Next confluence upstream	River Thames	Next confluence downstream
River Ember; River Mole (south)	The Rythe	Longford River, Raven's Ait (north)
