= Longford River =

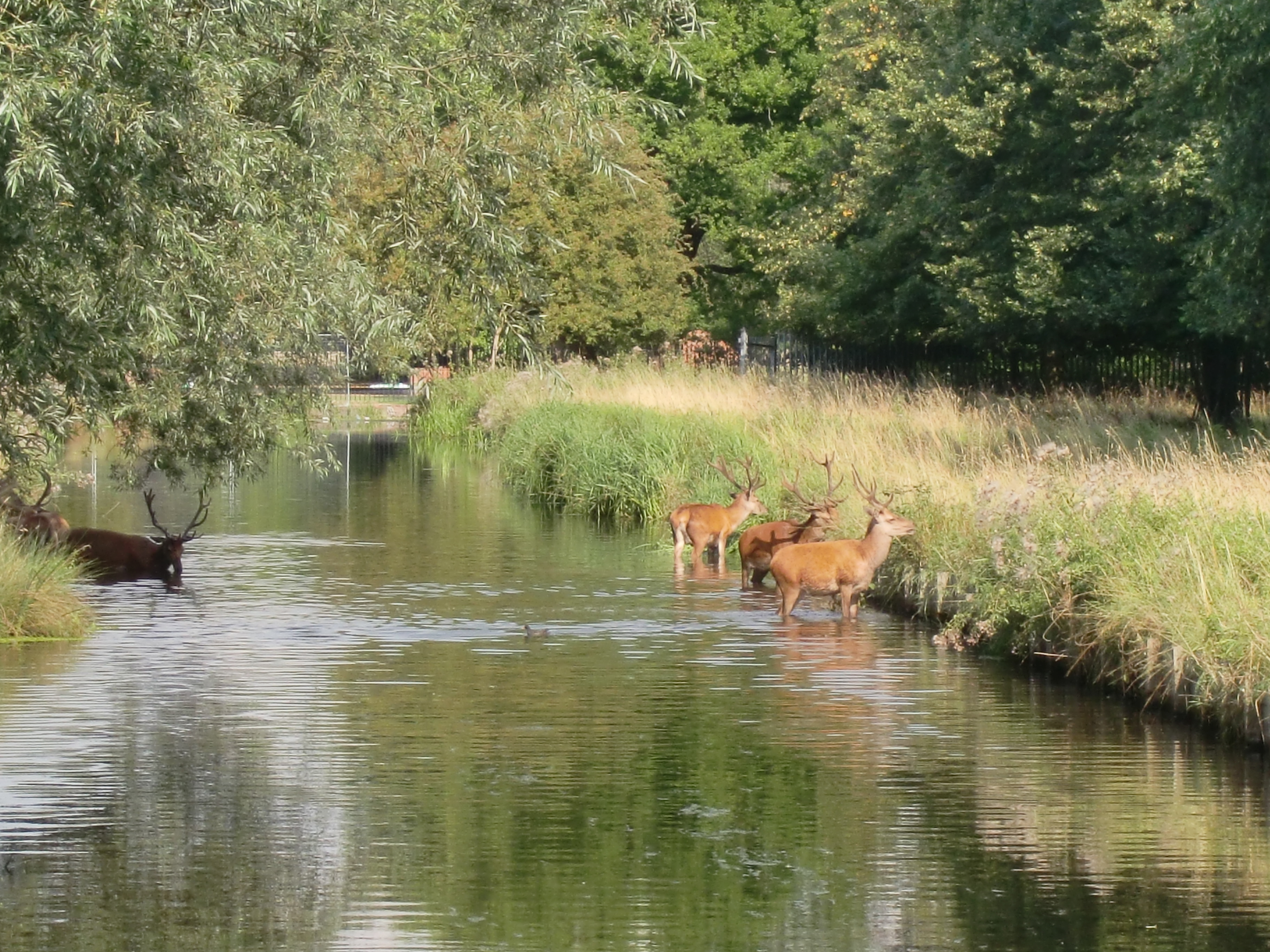
- The Longford River as it enters Bushy Park, viewed from Hampton Hill High Street. The artificial bank of this otherwise natural looking waterway can be seen in the opposite direction.

Location
- Country: England

Physical characteristics
- Source
  - location: River Colne, Longford
- Mouth
  - location: River Thames, Hampton Court
- Length: 12 mi (19 km)

The Longford River is an artificial waterway, a distributary designed to embellish a park, that diverts water 12 miles (19 km) from the River Colne at Longford near Colnbrook in England, to Bushy Park and Hampton Court Palace. Its main outlet is to the reach above Molesey Lock with lesser pond outlet channels to that above Teddington Lock (of the Thames). The waterway was built for King Charles I in 1638/39 as a water supply for Hampton Court. Water features in Bushy Park were added in 1710. North of the A30, its course has been diverted more than once as London Heathrow Airport has grown. Its cascades, grassed banks and fountains in Bushy Park were restored and reopened to the public in 2009 to close to their original state.

== Route ==
In its northern course, the Longford runs side by side with its older "twin", the Duke of Northumberland's River. Both have been re-dug near to their older lines to accommodate Heathrow Airport: most recently as part of the Twin Rivers Diversion Scheme for the taxiways and roads required by Terminal 5. The rivers emerge to flow along the Airport's southern perimeter, separating at 'Two Bridges' just east of Terminal 4; the original diversion dating to the 1940s.

The Longford River then flows south east, through Bedfont, Feltham and Hanworth, where it flows through two great culverts. One runs under a school, west of Hanworth Park. Another runs from the centre of the park to its eastern edge. The river then demarcates Hampton and Hampton Hill. It then crosses over the longest cutting of the Shepperton branch line on a short, brick-built, single-span aqueduct and runs in multiple channels through Bushy Park. One continues to water the lakes of Hampton Court. Four main outlets exist into the Thames:

- east of Hampton Gate of Bushy Park
- under the Water Gallery at Hampton Court Palace Gardens opposite the confluence of the River Mole
- One east of that expanse – becoming a mixture of golf course and farm – opposite Raven's Ait.
- Broom Park, opposite the Boater's Inn

Ownership, which comes with an upkeep cost is with The Royal Parks. Bye-laws such as shown by the prominent early-20th sign next to Feltham's former grand chapel of ease, made all unlawful trespass aggravated.

== History ==
Constructed in 1638–39 at the instigation of Charles I, the purpose of the Longford River was to bring water from the River Colne to augment the water supply to the Royal Parks at Bushy Park and Hampton Court. It was designed by Nicholas Lane, and took around nine months to build, at a cost of £4,000. It was not universally popular, as it was illegally stopped up in 1648 or -49, and petitions were presented to the authorities in 1653, arguing that it should not be reopened, alleging it caused flooding which damaged crops and livestock.

At Longford, Bath Road crosses the Duke of Northumberland's River, the Longford River and the Colne. Once London's main route to much of the south-southwest, but has since been bypassed by the A4 road, which crosses the Colne above its outlet to the Longford River. Longford Bridge carries Bath Road over the Duke's river. Moor Bridge carries it over the Colne. The first bridge there for crossing the Longford River was from time of construction. It was demolished in 1648, and is known to have been reinstated by 1675. It was known as Stone Bridge in the nineteenth century, and the responsibility for keeping it in good order belonged to the Crown. A name change had taken hold by 1960 to (the) King's Bridge, presumably following the installation of the cast iron replacement bridge by William IV in 1834.

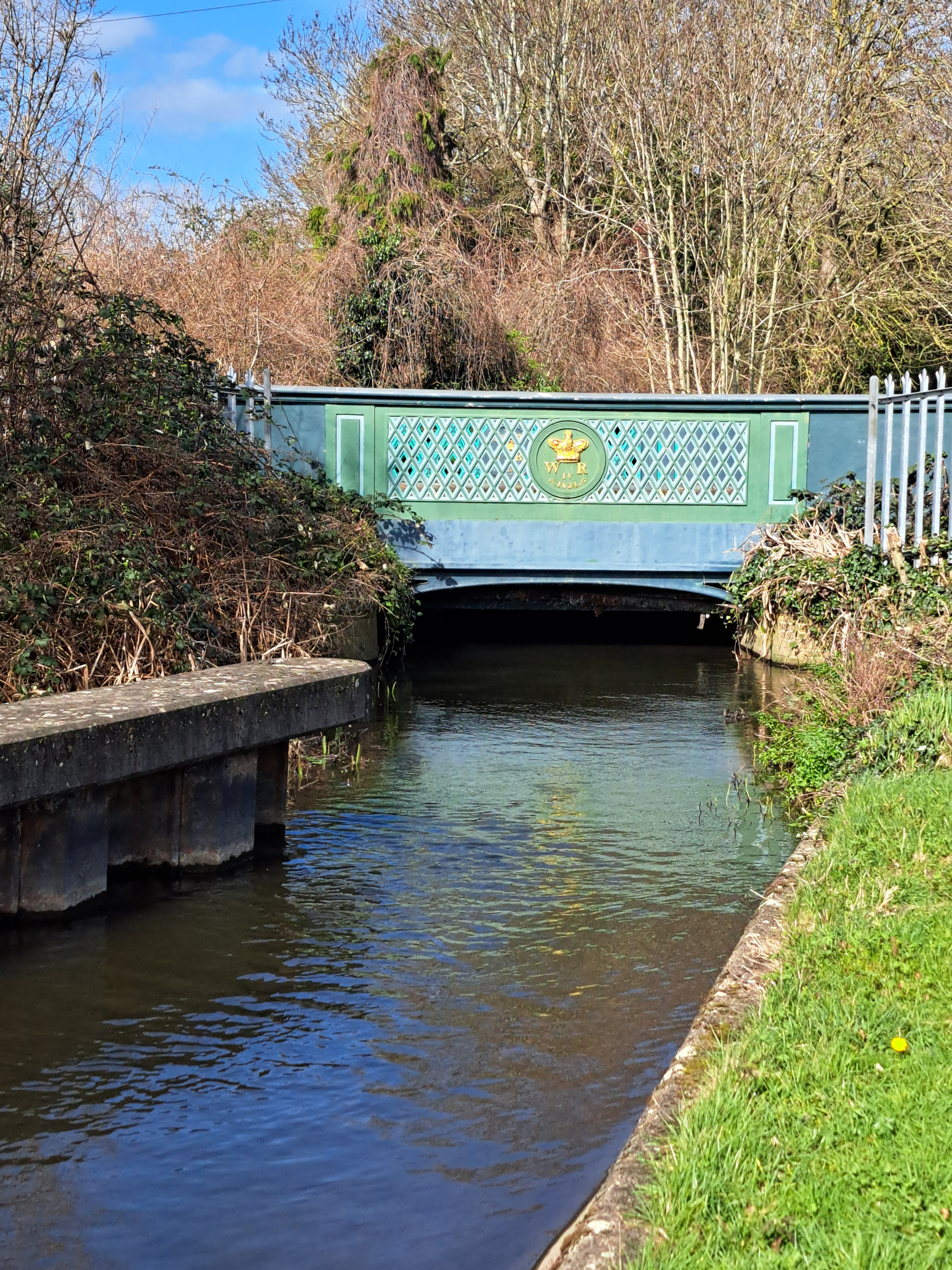
William IV's 1834 bridge over the Longford River

Before the 20th century, the watercourse was known variously as the New River, the King's River, the Queen's River, the Cardinal's River, the Hampton Court Cut, and the Hampton Court Canal.

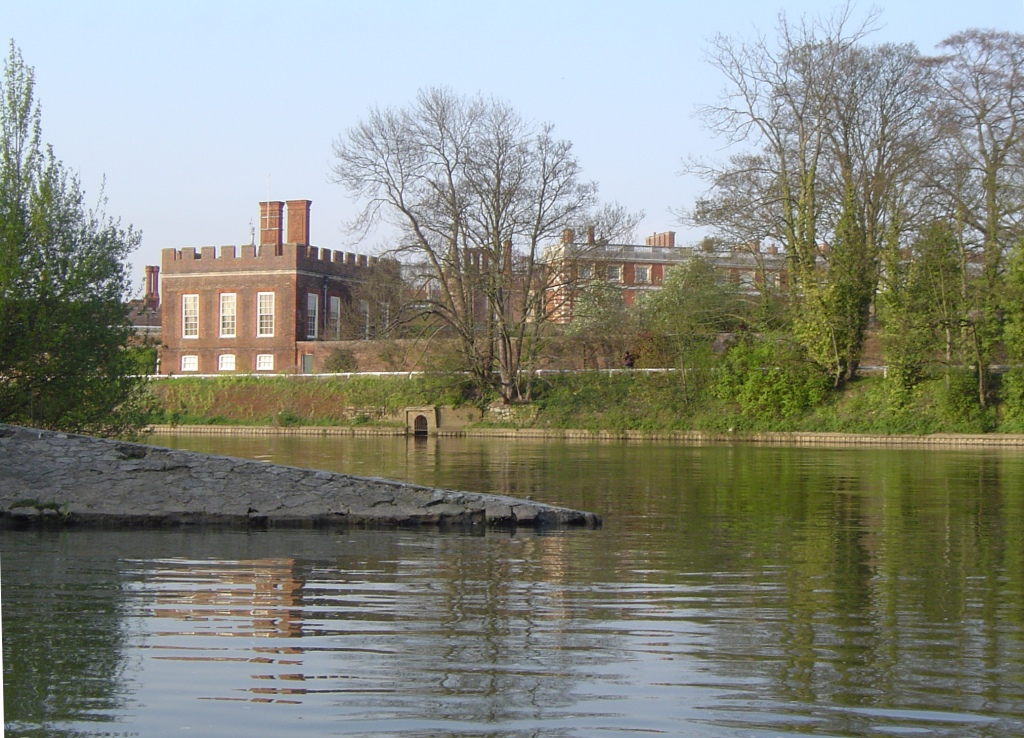
One outlet of the Longford River is visible on the bank of The Thames at the Water Gallery at Hampton Court, just above the junction with the River Mole. Viewed from the Mole across the Thames to Hampton Court

Before Heathrow Airport Terminal 5 was built, the Longford River and the Duke of Northumberland's River passed under the runways in culverts. As part of that project they were re-routed in open channels around the west edge of the airport. A new 3.7-mile (6.0 km) channel was constructed for each river, over 75 per cent of which were made from pre-cast panels manufactured off-site. Despite this construction method, biodiversity was encouraged by the use of hazel hurdles and coir rolls, pre-planted with native species, to provide habitat for small mammals. Habitat for fish was provided by creating meandering flow patterns using gravel and recycled trees, and the channels were populated with some 84,000 river plants. Water voles, plants, fish, freshwater mussels and silts from the original river bed were moved to the new channel to assist its regeneration, and landscaping involved planting 450 semi-mature trees, 2,000 shrubs and 100,000 groundcover shrubs. The scheme took 18 months to complete, and is now managed by the Twin Rivers Management Committee, with representatives from Heathrow Airport, the Environment Agency and the Royal Parks Agency. It was awarded a Civil Engineering Environmental Quality (CEEQUAL) Award, in recognition of the fact that it was completed on time, to budget, and maintained very high environmental standards throughout its construction.

=== Water features ===
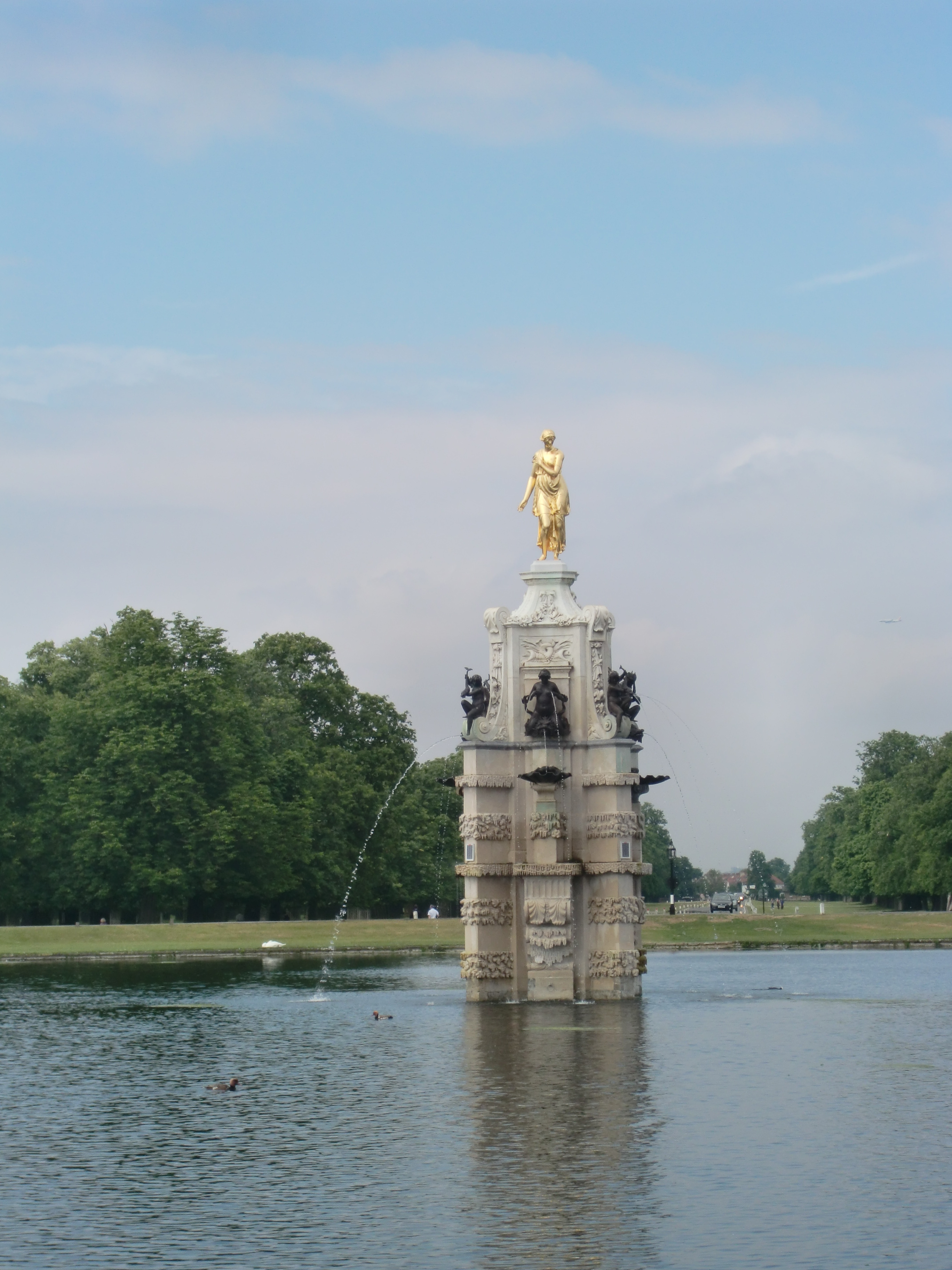
The Diana Fountain in Bushy Park from the south gate

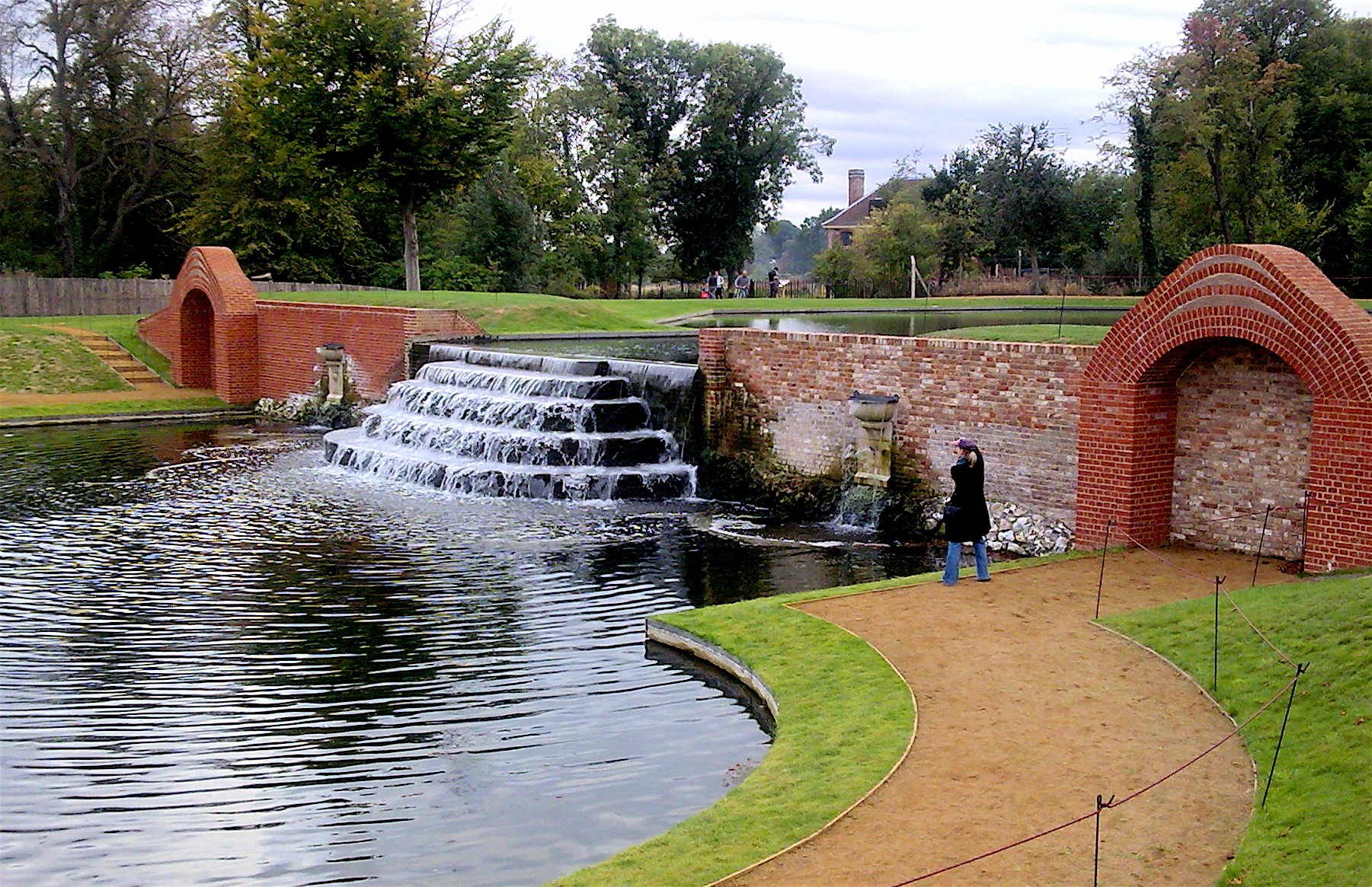
Upper Lodge Water Gardens in Bushy Park

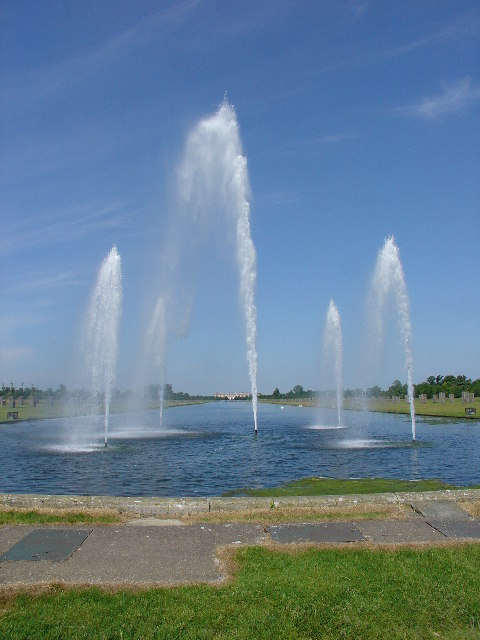
The Long Water in Hampton Court Park and Jubilee Fountain, fed by the Longford River

At its eastern end, the river feeds water features in Bushy Park and Hampton Court. To celebrate his queen, Henrietta Maria, Charles I had a statue and fountain made, by courtiers called Diana, the fountain depicts Arethusa, a water nymph, rather than the Roman goddess of hunting moved from Somerset House to Hampton Court by Oliver Cromwell, and then to the centre of its circular pond in Bushy Park by Sir Christopher Wren when he redesigned the gardens in 1713. The water gardens in Bushy Park were developed by the 1st Earl of Halifax in 1710.

During the First World War, Bushy Park was used to station Canadian troops, and during the Second World War was used by the USA Air Force. General Eisenhower was based there when the Allied invasion of north-west Europe was planned, which began with the D-Day landings. Most of the associated huts had been removed by 1963, but the park remained in military occupation, as the Admiralty used it as a research establishment during the Cold War. By the time military use had ceased in the early 1990s, much of the site was overgrown and damaged, but a group called the Friends of Bushy and Home Parks was formed, and began to research what was there. Aided by the discovery of an eighteenth-century painting of the park and archaeological investigation, a restoration programme for the whole park was developed, for which funding of £7.2 million was provided by the Heritage Lottery Fund, the Royal Parks and others. Preliminary investigation work began in 2006, with the main part of the project starting in January 2008, which involved dredging large volumes of silt from the ponds, restoring them to their original shape, and overhauling the water engineering system, to reconnect them to the Longford River. The cascades and flank walls were restored using original stonework and bricks where they could be found. The Longford River had been diverted by the Admiralty in 1953 while they were using the park, which had resulted in 5 feet (1.5 m) of silt building up in the ponds. Its removal revealed two extra steps of the cascades. The river was returned to its earlier course, and water flowed down the cascades for the first time on 15 September 2008. A new bridge was constructed over the river to link the Brew House to the water gardens, and the Baroque water gardens were reopened to the public in 2009. The cost of restoring them was £780,000.

At Hampton Court, the dominating feature of the grounds is the landscaping scheme constructed for the new palace by Sir Christopher Wren. There is a water-bounded semicircular parterre, the length of the east front. Three avenues radiate in crow's foot pattern into Hampton Court Park. The central avenue contains the great canal, known as the Long Water, excavated during the reign of Charles II, in 1662. The design, radical at the time, is influenced by Versailles, and was laid out by pupils of André Le Nôtre, Louis XIV's landscape gardener. At the eastern end of the Long Water is the Golden Jubilee Fountain. This was opened in November 2002 by Queen Elizabeth II, and features five jets, the largest of which rises to a height of 98 feet (30 m).

== Water quality ==
The Environment Agency measure the water quality of the river systems in England. Each is given an overall ecological status, which may be one of five levels: high, good, moderate, poor and bad. There are several components that are used to determine this, including biological status, which looks at the quantity and varieties of invertebrates, angiosperms and fish. Chemical status, which compares the concentrations of various chemicals against known safe concentrations, is rated good or fail.

The water quality of the Longford River was as follows in 2019.

Section	Ecological Status	Chemical Status	Length	Channel
Longford River	Moderate	Fail	10.0 miles (16.1 km)	artificial

Like most rivers in the UK, the chemical status changed from good to fail in 2019, due to the presence of polybrominated diphenyl ethers (PBDE) and perfluorooctane sulphonate (PFOS), neither of which had previously been included in the assessment.

== Points of interest ==
Point	Coordinates (Links to map resources)	OS Grid Ref	Notes
Offtake (source) from River Colne	51.4809°N 0.4923°W	TQ047768	Start of channel
Bridge for Terminal 5 access road	51.4629°N 0.4890°W	TQ050748	Channel follows Heathrow Airport boundary
Duke of Northumberland's River diverges	51.4532°N 0.4291°W	TQ092738	
Feltham Station bridge	51.4532°N 0.4291°W	TQ092738	
Culvert under school	51.4424°N 0.4021°W	TQ111727	
Culvert under Hanworth Park	51.4404°N 0.3938°W	TQ117724	
Aqueduct over Shepperton Branch Line	51.4232°N 0.3612°W	TQ140706	
Weir at entrance to Bushy Park	51.4214°N 0.3543°W	TQ145704	
Western cascade into Thames	51.4101°N 0.3526°W	TQ146691	Opposite River Mole
Diana Fountain in Bushy Park	51.4100°N 0.3364°W	TQ158691	
Main eastern sluice to Thames	51.3996°N 0.3109°W	TQ175680	By Ravens Ait

== See also ==
- Tributaries of the River Thames
- List of rivers of England

== Bibliography ==
- Baker, T F T; Cockburn, J S; Pugh, R B (1971). A History of the County of Middlesex: Volume 4. Victoria County History. British History Online. ISBN 978-0-19-722727-5.
- Dynes, Wayne (1968). Palaces of Europe. London: Hamlyn. ISBN 978-1-299-84804-7. OCLC 37658.

=== References ===
Next confluence upstream	River Thames	Next confluence downstream
River Ash (south)	Longford River	River Mole, River Ember (south)
The Rythe (south)	Longford River	Hogsmill River (south)
