= Tributaries of the River Thames =

This article lists the tributaries of the River Thames from the sea to the source, in England. There are also secondary lists of backwaters of the river itself and the waterways branching off.

Note: the River Medway shares the saline lower Thames Estuary.

== Tributaries ==
Name	Confluence	Average discharge (m^{3}/s)	Source	Length	Tributaries	Catchment	Notes
Ebbsfleet River	Northfleet; 51.4503°N 0.3296°E		Springhead, just S. of the A2 road at Southfleet	2.4 miles (3.9 km)			Approx. 10 miles due west of London Stone at grid reference TQ860786
Mardyke	Purfleet; 51.4856°N 0.2278°E	0.48	Holden's Wood between Great Warley and Little Warley	11 miles (18 km)		35 square miles (91 km^{2})	
River Darent	Dartford; 51.4802°N 0.2176°E	0.72	Westerham	21 miles (34 km)	River Cray	154 square miles (400 km^{2})	Tidal reach: Dartford Creek
River Ingrebourne or Ingrebourne	Rainham, London; 51.5075°N 0.1733°E	0.33	Brentwood	27 miles (43 km)			Tidal reach: Rainham Creek
River Beam and/or Rom and Bourne Brook	Dagenham; 51.5118°N 0.1587°E	0.34	Stapleford Abbotts Golf Club, Watton's Green	13 miles (21 km)	The Ravensbourne		Rom upstream of inflow of Ravensbourne
Wogebourne	Crossness, Thamesmead; 51.5125°N 0.12417°E		Oxleas Wood, Shooter's Hill	5 miles (8.0 km)			
River Roding	Creekmouth; 51.5145°N 0.0987°E	1.85	Molehill Green, near Dunmow	31 miles (50 km)	Cripsey Brook; Cran Brook; Alders Brook; Seven Kings Water; Mayes Brook	132 square miles (340 km^{2})	Tidal reach: Barking Creek
River Lea	Leamouth; 51.5071°N 0.0092°E	5.48	Leagrave	42 miles (68 km)	The Hackney Brook; River Moselle; Pymmes Brook; River Ching; Turkey Brook; River Stort; River Beane; River Mimram	550 square miles (1,400 km^{2})	Tidal reach: Bow Creek
River Ravensbourne or Ravensbourne	Deptford; 51.4835°N 0.0185°W	0.43	Keston	11 miles (18 km)	Spring Brook; River Pool; River Quaggy	69 square miles (180 km^{2})	Tidal reach: Deptford Creek
River Neckinger or the Neckinger Channel	Shad Thames; 51.5024°N 0.0708°W		north Southwark	0.8 miles (1.3 km) (about; longer old catchment drains to other surface and combined water conduits)			Mainly diverted to surface and combined sewer drains
River Walbrook or Walbrook	Walbrook Wharf, just west of Cannon Street railway station. 51.5094°N 0.0928°W		north walls of City of London (trad.)	0 miles (0 km)			Diverted to surface and combined sewer drains
River Fleet or Fleet stream	Bazelgette's Mid and Lower Northern Interceptor Sewers (previously a stream/field ditch ending at Blackfriars, London); 51.5108°N 0.1048°W		Hampstead Heath	1 mile (1.6 km) (as to connecting lengths of ponds)	Lamb's Conduit, Fagswell Brook		Diverted to surface and combined sewer drains. Was also known as the Holbourne/Holborn
River Effra	Vauxhall; 51.4873°N 0.1258°W		west and east limits of Gypsy Hill, London	0 miles (0 km)			Diverted to surface and combined sewer drains
River Tyburn, the Tyburn or the Ty Bourne	north and south of Vauxhall Bridge, and small forked mouth around Horseguards Avenue, Westminster (4 mouths); 51.4880°N 0.1287°W		South Hampstead	0 miles (0 km)			Diverted to surface and combined sewer drains
Falconbrook	Battersea; 51.4680°N 0.1808°W		Tooting Graveney Common, Tooting and east end of Poynder's Road, Clapham	0 miles (0 km)			Diverted to surface and combined sewer drains
River Westbourne	Chelsea; 51.4850°N 0.1537°W		Grange Gardens, Hampstead, West Hampstead and two sources in east Willesden (today's Brondesbury Park)	0 miles (0 km)	Tyburn Brook		Diverted to surface and combined sewer drains
Counter's Creek	west Chelsea/east Fulham; 51.4778°N 0.1794°W		Kensal Green	0 miles (0 km)			Diverted to surface and combined sewer drains
River Wandle	Wandsworth; 51.4629°N 0.1952°W	1.7	Waddon	9 miles (14 km)	River Graveney	78 square miles (200 km^{2})	
Beverley Brook	Putney; 51.4718°N 0.2229°W		Worcester Park	9 miles (14 km)	Pyl Brook	25 square miles (65 km^{2})	
Stamford Brook	Hammersmith; 51.4903°N 0.2341°W		Acton	0 miles (0 km)			Diverted to surface and combined sewer drains – old tidal mouth: Hammersmith Creek
Bollo or Bollar Brook	Chiswick; 51.4794°N 0.2512°W		Acton	0 miles (0 km)			Diverted to surface and combined sewer drains
River Brent	Brentford; 51.4830°N 0.3000°W	1.32	Barnet	18 miles (29 km)	Dollis Brook; Folly Brook; Mutton Brook	58 square miles (150 km^{2})	
Duke of Northumberland's River (west) and (east)	Isleworth; 51.4704°N 0.3212°W		River Crane & River Colne	9.3 miles (15.0 km) (includes eastern 2.5 miles)			Artificial distributary of the Colne and Crane
River Crane	Isleworth; 51.4654°N 0.3215°W	0.54	Hayes, Hillingdon	9 miles (14 km)	Yeading Brook	42 square miles (110 km^{2})	
Sudbrook	Petersham; 51.4487°N 0.3058°W		Dann's Pond, Richmond Park	2 miles (3.2 km)	Latchmere Stream		Culverted
Hogsmill River	Kingston upon Thames; 51.4093°N 0.3085°W	0.98	Ewell	6 miles (9.7 km)	Bonesgate Stream	28 square miles (73 km^{2})	
The Rythe	Thames Ditton; 51.3911°N 0.3260°W		north Oxshott	4.2 miles (6.8 km)			
River Mole	Molesey; 51.4012°N 0.3393°W	5.43	Rusper	50 miles (80 km)	Ifield Brook; Gatwick Stream; Earlswood Brook; Pipp Brook; The Rye	198 square miles (510 km^{2})	
Longford River	Hampton Court Palace; 51.4013°N 0.3383°W		River Colne	12 miles (19 km)			Artificial distributary of the Colne
River Ash	southwest corner of Sunbury-on-Thames; 51.3977°N 0.4173°W		River Colne	6.2 miles (10.0 km)			Distributary of the Colne
River Wey (and Caker Stream)	Weybridge; 51.3804°N 0.4570°W	6.95	Hartley Mauditt and Upper Farringdon, Hampshire (main, north or west branch); parishes of Fernhurst/Lurgashall in South Downs National Park (south branch)	53 miles (85 km)	River Ock, Surrey; Cranleigh Waters; River Tillingbourne; Hoe Stream (fed by the Hodge Brook and Stanford Brook); Of south branch: River Slea, Hampshire; Dead Water; Cooper's Stream	350 square miles (910 km^{2})	Source of south branch about 52 miles to/from mouth.
River Bourne, Chertsey	Weybridge; 51.3785°N 0.4638°W		Windsor Great Park, Ascot and Swinley Forest	13.2 miles (21.2 km)	River Bourne, Addlestone		
River Colne	Staines; 51.4329°N 0.5152°W	4.05 (before all distributaries)	North Mymms	36 miles (58 km)	River Pinn; River Misbourne; River Chess; River Gade; River Ver		
Colne Brook	Hythe End, Wraysbury; 51.4379°N 0.5352°W		River Colne	9.2 miles (14.8 km)			Distributary of the Colne
The Cut	Bray; 51.4991°N 0.6815°W		North Ascot	14 miles (23 km)	Bull Brook, The Bourne		
River Wye	Bourne End; 51.5704°N 0.7111°W	1.00	West Wycombe; 51.647802°N 0.812522°W	8.7 miles (14.0 km)	Hughenden Stream		In wet years this river is additionally sourced by an aquifer further up the same valley, extending the river by another mile in length.
Hamble Brook	Hambleden Marina; 51.5585°N 00.8695°W						Sourced by an aquifer in the Hambleden Valley, occasionally dry.
River Loddon	Wargrave; 51.5017°N 0.8800°W	2.16	Basingstoke	28 miles (45 km)	St Patrick's Stream; River Broadwater; Emm Brook; River Blackwater	400 square miles (1,000 km^{2})	
Berry Brook	Hallsmead Ait, near Shiplake; 51.4913°N 0.8953°W		street (Surface Water) drains of South View Avenue, Caversham	4 miles (6.4 km)			
River Kennet	Reading; 51.4590°N 0.9495°W	9.75	Swallowhead spring and others near Silbury Hill	45 miles (72 km)	Foudry Brook; Clayhill Brook; River Enborne; River Lambourn; River Dun; River Og	450 square miles (1,200 km^{2})	
River Pang	Pangbourne; 51.4858°N 1.0880°W	0.62	Compton	14 miles (23 km)	River Bourne, Berkshire; River Roden	66 square miles (170 km^{2})	
River Thame	Dorchester; 51.6348°N 1.1660°W	3.90	Rowsham / Cheddington, Vale of Aylesbury	40 miles (64 km)		310 square miles (800 km^{2})	
River Ock	Abingdon; 51.6665°N 1.2838°W	1.52	Cock Well, Little Coxwell	21 miles (34 km)	Holywell Brook (rising in same parish); Stutfield Brook		
River Cherwell	Oxford; 51.7421°N 1.2483°W	7.2	Hellidon	40 miles (64 km)	River Ray; River Swere	364 square miles (940 km^{2})	
River Evenlode	Above King's Lock; 51.7849°N 1.3378°W	3.7	Moreton-in-Marsh, Oxfordshire	10 miles (16 km)	River Glyme; Rollright Brook		
River Windrush	Newbridge; 51.7100°N 1.4173°W	3.27	Taddington, Gloucestershire	40 miles (64 km)	River Dikler; River Eye, Gloucestershire	140 square miles (360 km^{2})	
River Cole	Above Buscot Lock; 51.6887°N 1.6772°W	1.20	Burderop Park, Hodson, Wiltshire	17 miles (27 km)	Dorcan Stream (has subsumed original Cole sources); Pennyhooks Brook		
River Leach	Lechlade; 51.6891°N 1.6772°W	0.75	Hampnett, Gloucestershire	18 miles (29 km)			
River Coln	Lechlade; 51.6881°N 1.7052°W	2.06	Brockhampton, Gloucestershire	30 miles (48 km)			
River Ray, Wiltshire	Cricklade; 51.6442°N 1.8252°W	1.28	Markham Hill, Wroughton, Wiltshire	12 miles (19 km)			
River Key	Cricklade; 51.6424°N 1.8461°W		West of Battle Lake, Braydon	6.5 miles (10.5 km)			
River Churn	Cricklade; 51.6450°N 1.8533°W	0.86	Seven Springs, Gloucestershire	16 miles (26 km)			

The average discharge is taken from the lowest point at which measurements are taken, which may be upstream of the confluence.

== Backwaters and cuts ==
This list comprises the principal instances; longest ex-mill races (leats), with own articles are included; the main weirstream/river stream of each Thames lock is omitted and the smallest such associated instances; but the Sheepwash Channel is included for its importance in Oxford.

Principal backwaters and cuts (ordered lowest to highest elevation)
Name	Re-convergence	Length	Effluence
The Creek, Sunbury	Wheatley's Ait (North), Sunbury-on-Thames 51.401°N 0.413°W	0.654 miles (1.053 km)	Tumbling Bay weir, east Shepperton (traditionally) (& storm weir)
Desborough Cut	SW Walton-on-Thames 51.384°N 0.436°W	0.682 miles (1.098 km)	NE Weybridge
Abbey River	Chertsey Lock 51.397°N 0.488°W	2 miles (3.2 km)	Penton Hook Island, Thorpe
Jubilee River	Black Potts Ait, Datchet 51.491°N 0.593°W	7.2 miles (11.6 km)	Boulter's Lock, Taplow
Clewer Mill Stream	Queen Elizabeth Bridge, Windsor 51.487°N 0.624°W	1.5 miles (2.4 km)	Bush Ait, Clewer, Windsor, Berkshire
Hennerton Backwater	Opposite Ferry Eyot 51.522°N 0.878°W	1.25 miles (2.01 km)	Above Camps Puddle, by foot of Wargrave Hill
Swift Ditch	Culham Bridge 51.658°N 1.278°W	1.5 miles (2.4 km)	Abingdon Lock
Seacourt Stream and Hinksey Stream	Kennington Railway Bridge, Oxford 51.721°N 1.243°W	6 miles (9.7 km)	North Wytham
Castle Mill Stream	Gasworks Bridge, Oxford 51.746°N 1.264°W	0.66 miles (1.06 km)	Port Meadow, Oxford
Bulstake Stream	Osney Rail Bridge51.747°N 1.267°W	1.7 miles (2.7 km)	Four Rivers, Oxford
Sheepwash Channel	Four Rivers, Oxford 51.755°N 1.272°W	0.1 miles (0.16 km)	Castle Mill Stream at Isis Lock
Kingsbridge Brook/ Wolvercote Mill Stream	Above Godstow Lock and weir 51.779°N 1.297°W	1.3 miles (2.1 km)	Oxey Mead, south Yarnton, Oxfordshire

== Linked waterways ==
Name	Via	Confluence	Length	Destination	Notes
Regent's Canal		Limehouse Basin south exit 51.5120°N 0.0367°W		Little Venice junction with Paddington Arm of Grand Union Canal (to Paddington Basin, or Hayes for Brentford riverside or main course to the Midlands)	
Lee Navigation	Lower River Lea	Bromley-by-Bow 51.5071°N 0.0092°E		Hertford Castle Weir, Hertford, Hertfordshire	
Grand Union Canal	Lower River Brent	Brentford 51.4830°N 0.3000°W		Birmingham	
Wey and Godalming Navigations	Lower River Wey	Weybridge 51.3804°N 0.4570°W	20 miles (32 km)	Godalming, Surrey, via Guildford	
Maidenhead Waterways		Bray 51.4991°N 0.6815°W		—	Unnavigable
Kennet and Avon Canal	River Kennet	Reading 51.4590°N 0.9495°W	87 miles (140 km)	Bristol and via Avonmouth the Bristol Channel, Atlantic Ocean	
Wilts & Berks Canal		Abingdon 51.6510°N 1.2827°W	52 miles (84 km)	Kennet and Avon Canal at Semington near Melksham, west Wiltshire	Abandoned 1914, under restoration
Oxford Canal	Sheepwash Channel, Oxford	Oxford 51.7463°N 1.2636°W	78 miles (126 km)	Coventry, Warwickshire and the Grand Union Canal	
Oxford Canal	Dukes Cut	King's Lock 51.7896°N 1.3085°W	78 miles (126 km)	Coventry, Warwickshire and the Grand Union Canal	
Thames and Severn Canal	River Coln	Lechlade 51.6881°N 1.7052°W		Stroud, Gloucestershire and Gloucester and the Severn valley	Closed 1933, under restoration

== Poem by Alexander Pope listing some Thames tributaries ==
Around his Throne the Sea-born Brothers stood,
That swell with Tributary Urns his Flood.
First the fam'd Authors of his ancient Name,
The winding Isis, and the fruitful Tame:
The Kennet swift, for silver Eels renown'd;
The Loddon slow, with verdant Alders crown'd:
Cole, whose clear Streams his flow'ry Islands lave;
And chalky Wey, that rolls a milky Wave:
The blue, transparent Vandalis appears;
The gulphy Lee his sedgy Tresses rears:
And sullen Mole, that hides his diving Flood;
And silent Darent, stain'd with Danish Blood.

— Alexander Pope, Windsor Forest (lines 335–346)

== See also ==
- Locks and weirs on the River Thames
- Islands in the River Thames
