= River Mole =

Tributary of the River Thames in southern England

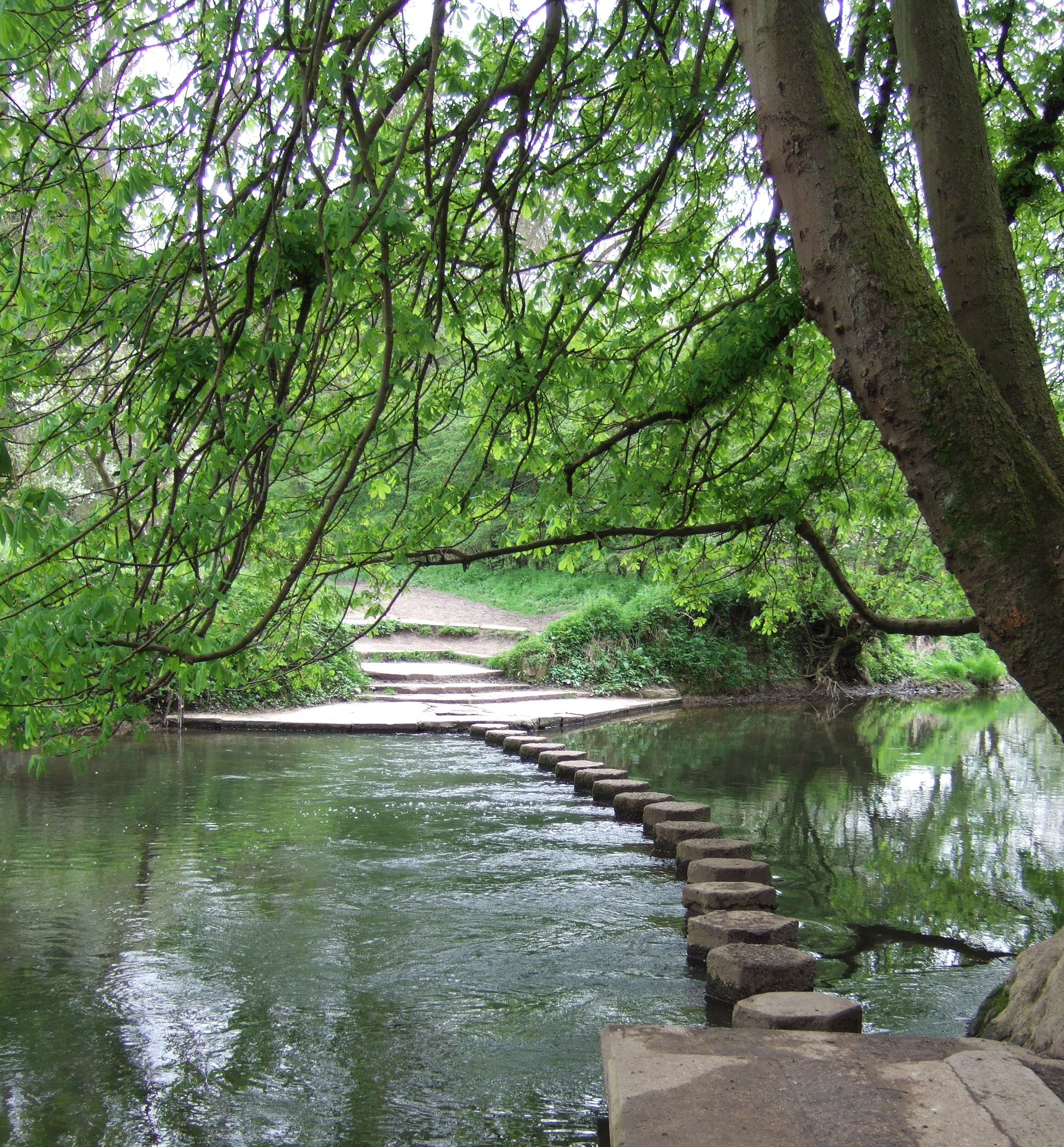
- The River Mole at the foot of Box Hill in Surrey

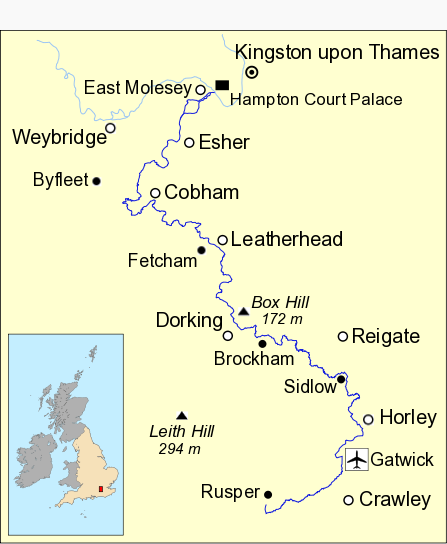
- Map showing the River Mole (dark blue) and part of the River Thames (light blue)

Location
- Country: England
- Counties: West Sussex, Surrey
- Districts / Boroughs: Horsham, Crawley, Mole Valley, Reigate and Banstead, Elmbridge
- Towns: Crawley, Horley, Dorking, Leatherhead, Cobham, Surrey, Esher, Walton-on-Thames, Hersham

Physical characteristics
- Source: Baldhorns Copse
  - location: Rusper, Horsham, West Sussex
  - coordinates: 51°7′30″N 0°16′26″W
  - elevation: 105 m (344 ft)
- Mouth: River Thames
  - location: East Molesey, Elmbridge, Surrey
  - coordinates: 51°24′4″N 0°20′21″W
  - elevation: 6 m (20 ft)
- Length: 80 km (50 mi)
- Basin size: 512 km^{2} (198 sq mi)
- Discharge
  - location: Esher
  - average: 5.43 m^{3}/s (192 cu ft/s)
  - minimum: 1.00 m^{3}/s (35 cu ft/s)(9 August 1993)
  - maximum: 99.9 m^{3}/s (3,530 cu ft/s)(9 December 1994)
- Discharge
  - location: Castle Mill, Dorking
  - average: 3.74 m^{3}/s (132 cu ft/s)
- Discharge
  - location: Kinnersley Manor, Sidlow
  - average: 2.21 m^{3}/s (78 cu ft/s)
- Discharge
  - location: Horley
  - average: 1.40 m^{3}/s (49 cu ft/s)
- Discharge
  - location: Gatwick Airport
  - average: 0.33 m^{3}/s (12 cu ft/s)

The River Mole is a tributary of the River Thames in southern England. It rises in West Sussex near Gatwick Airport and flows north-west through Surrey for 80 km (50 miles) to the Thames at Hampton Court Palace. The river gives its name to the Surrey district of Mole Valley.

The Mole crosses the North Downs between Dorking and Leatherhead, where it cuts a steep-sided valley, known as the Mole Gap, through the chalk. Much of the catchment area lies on impermeable rock (including Weald Clay and London Clay), meaning that the river level responds rapidly to heavy rainfall.

During the second half of the 20th century, pollution levels in the river were high; however, since 1995 the water quality has improved dramatically and the Mole now boasts the greatest diversity of fish species of any river in England. Twelve Sites of Special Scientific Interest (SSSIs) that include wetland habitats are located within the Mole catchment area, and the stretch of river through Leatherhead has been designated a Local Nature Reserve. The Mole Gap forms part of a Special Area of Conservation and is an SSSI of European importance.

The river has captured the imagination of several authors and poets, particularly since in very hot summers the river channel can become dry between Dorking and Leatherhead, most recently in 2026. In John Speed's 1611 map of Surrey, this stretch of the river is denoted by a series of hills accompanied by the legend "The river runneth under". However the river's name is unlikely to have derived from this behaviour: The Oxford Dictionary of English Place Names suggests that Mole either comes from the Latin mola (a mill) or is a back-formation from Molesey (Mul's island). Domesday Book lists twenty mills on the river in 1086, of which Sidlow Mill was the oldest, dating from Saxon times.

== Catchment area ==
The drainage area of the Mole is 477 km^{2} (184 sq mi) and forms 5% of the River Thames's catchment area above Teddington. The catchment area receives 761 mm (30.0 in) of rain each year; the greatest average level of rainfall is 800 mm (31.5 in) around Crawley. The Mole catchment reaches a maximum elevation of 265 m (869 ft) above Ordnance Datum at Leith Hill to the southwest of Dorking. There is only one aquifer in the drainage basin, at Fetcham, which means that the majority of the water in the river is from surface drainage, particularly from Gatwick Airport and the urban areas of Horley and Crawley, and that the flow rate responds rapidly to rainfall.

== Course ==
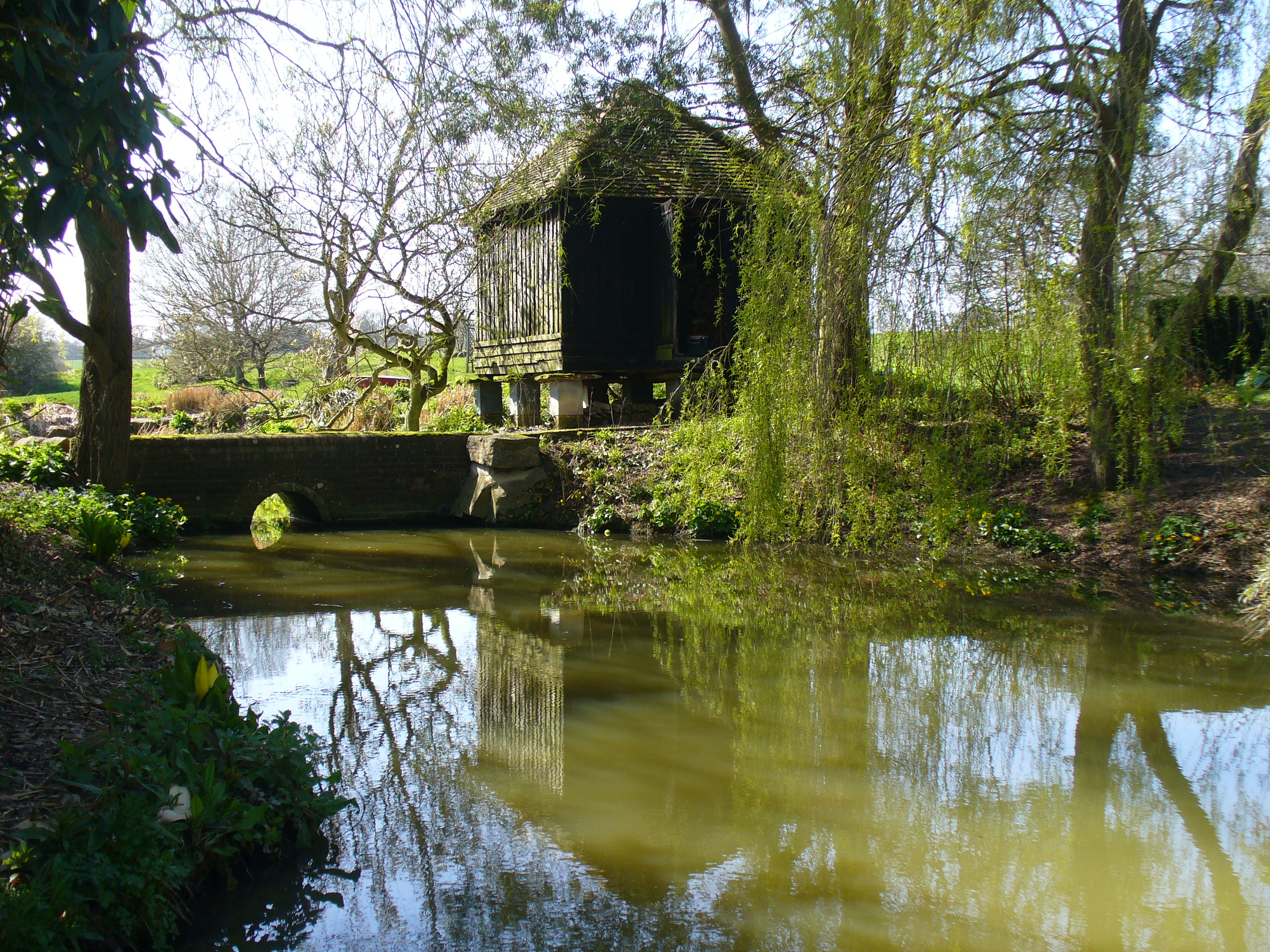
River Mole at Baldhorns Park, approximately 1 km (0.6 mi) downstream of the source at Rusper

=== Upper Mole ===
The Mole rises in Baldhorns Copse 700 m (0.4 mi) to the south of the village of Rusper in West Sussex. It flows initially southwards for 1 km (0.6 mi) to a small lake at Baldhorns Park, before running eastwards through a largely rural area towards Crawley. The first tributaries to join the young river drain the northernmost part of St Leonard's Forest, between Horsham and Crawley, although much of the forest is in the catchment area of the River Arun. The Mole skirts the northern suburbs of Crawley where it is joined by its first major tributary, Ifield Brook, which drains Ifield Mill Pond.

The first gauging station on the Mole is south of Gatwick Airport (57 m [187 ft] above OD). (Note: The gauging station south of Gatwick Airport was installed in 2005, replacing an earlier station located 200 m (220 yd) downstream.) The mean flow is 0.33 m^{3}/s (12 cu ft/s) and the river ran dry at this point for the first time in the summer of 1995. The Mole runs under the airport runway in a culvert completed in 1985. The course of the Mole within the airport perimeter has been altered several times since commercial flights began in 1945; however the meanders visible on the 1839 tithe map in the 1.5 km (0.93 mi) stretch immediately north of the runway were reinstated in 1999, in a £1.2 million project to facilitate airport expansion.

The Mole enters Surrey to the south of Horley, where it meets the Gatwick Stream, a tributary draining Worth Forest to the southeast of Crawley. The second-largest Sewage Treatment Works (STW) in the Mole catchment is located on the Gatwick Stream 3 km (1.9 mi) upstream of the confluence with the Mole: Crawley STW discharges 15,000 m^{3} (530,000 cu ft) of water per day, and in prolonged dry periods it accounts for up to 75% of the flow of the Mole downstream of the confluence. The mean flow measured at Horley gauging station (52 m [171 ft] above OD) is 1.40 m^{3}/s (49 cu ft/s).

The Mole passes Horley to the west, flowing north towards Sidlow and entering a largely rural area. 0.7 km (0.4 mi) south of Sidlow the mean flow is measured as 2.21 m^{3}/s (78 cu ft/s) at Kinnersley Manor gauging station (48 m [157 ft] above OD). The Earlswood Brook, a tributary draining the urban area of Reigate and Redhill, joins the Mole at Sidlow. The largest STW in the Mole catchment (Reigate STW) discharges up to 118,500 m^{3} (4,180,000 cu ft) per day into the Earlswood Brook. (Note: A principal tributary of the Earlswood Brook is the Redhill Brook, which includes The Moors wetland nature reserve within its catchment area.)

From Sidlow, the Mole turns northwest towards Brockham. A number of minor tributaries join the river from the west and are typically second order streams draining the woodland and arable land between Horsham and Dorking. The 18th-century weir at Betchworth was modified in 2004 to facilitate the installation of two 27.5 kW low-head hydro turbines. About 90% of the energy generated is fed into the regional electricity grid, while the remainder is used to supply the Betchworth Park Estate, where the weir is situated. The river leaves the Weald Clay at Brockham, passing Betchworth Castle and flowing briefly across greensand and Gault Clay to Pixham, 1 km (0.6 mi) northeast of Dorking. A mean flow of 3.74 m^{3}/s (132 cu ft/s) is measured at a fourth gauging station, located at Castle Mill (39 m [128 ft] above OD). At Pixham the Mole meets the Pipp Brook, a tributary draining the northeastern slopes of Leith Hill. (Note: The Pipp Brook drains the northernmost heavily wooded slopes of Leith Hill (which include Squire's Great Wood and Abinger Forest), as well as areas of Wotton, Westcott and Dorking.)

=== Mole Gap ===
Between Dorking and Leatherhead the Mole cuts a steep-sided valley (the Mole Gap) though the North Downs, carving a 170-metre-high (560 ft) river cliff on the western flank of Box Hill and a smaller 50-metre (160 ft) cliff at Ham Bank in Norbury Park. The sudden change from impermeable Weald Clay to permeable chalk and the increased gradient (Note: The Mole descends 15 m [49 ft] in the 10 km [6 mi] stretch between Brockham and Leatherhead, compared to 3 m [9.8 ft] in 19 km [12 mi] between Horley and Brockham.) of the river, allow the water table to drop below the bed of the river. Water is therefore able to flow out of the river through swallow holes in the bed and banks, decreasing the volume of water carried in the main channel.

The course of the river through Norbury Park was partially straightened when the Epsom to Horsham railway was built in 1837, with the removal of a small meander north of Westhumble. The meander was reinstated in 1997, in an attempt to enhance this area of the Park, although it has since become blocked by silt. The entirety of the Mole Gap lies within the Surrey Hills Area of Outstanding Natural Beauty.

=== Lower Mole ===
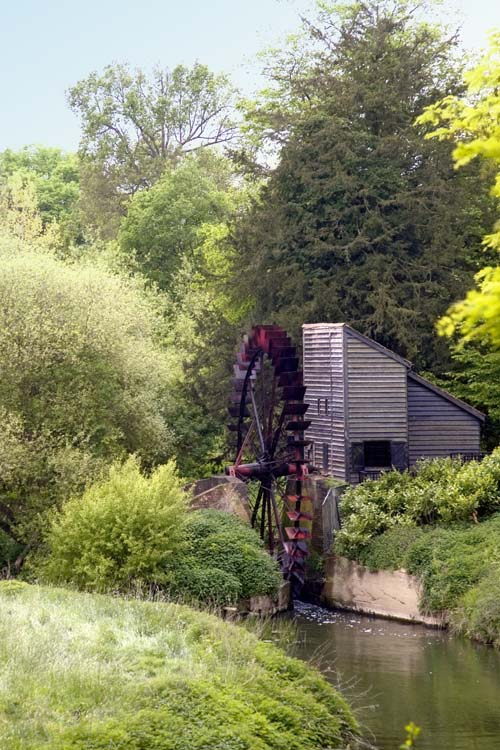
Painshill Park Waterwheel (on its millstream channel)

At Leatherhead, the Mole leaves the chalk and turns northwestwards to flow across impermeable London Clay, winding towards Cobham. The water table rises at this point and much of the water which drained out of the channel through the chalk returns through springs in the riverbed. The aquifer at Fetcham is the only one in the entire catchment area. The next major tributary, The Rye, (which drains Ashtead) joins to the north of Leatherhead, before the river is crossed by the M25 motorway. At Cobham the river swings round in a pronounced axehead meander skirting Painshill Landscape Garden, where a 11-metre (35 ft) diameter waterwheel raises water 5 metres (16 ft) from the river to feed the ornamental lake in the park. (Note: The undershot wheel at Painshill Park was restored in 1987 and is located at the end of an artificial leat, rather than on the main river channel.)

From Painshill Park the river flows northeastwards to the Thames, passing to the west of Esher Commons and then forming the boundary between Hersham and Esher, where the mean flow of the river is 5.43 m^{3}/s (192 cu ft/s). In response to heavy flooding of East Molesey and Thames Ditton in September 1968, the river was modified downstream of Albany Bridge to the Thames and new flood defences were constructed. Finally the Mole splits into two branches at the Island Barn Reservoir near Molesey: the northern (and smaller) branch continues as the River Mole and the southern branch is known as the River Ember. The two rivers flow either side of the reservoir, before running side by side in a northeasterly direction, merging 400 m (440 yd) before the confluence with the River Thames, on the reach above Teddington Lock. (For the purposes of the remainder of this article, the River Mole and the River Ember are treated as a single entity.)

Prior to the last ice age, the River Thames followed a more northerly route to the North Sea, from Reading via Marlow, Chorleywood, St Albans, Hertford and along the present Suffolk–Essex border. During this period, the Mole is thought to have merged with the River Wey near Byfleet and then flowed in a north-easterly direction via Richmond to meet the proto-Thames near Ware in Hertfordshire. Today the Mole and Wey are less than 2 km (1.2 mi) apart at their closest point near Painshill Park. During the Middle Pleistocene period, (Note: The Middle Pleistocene period was c. 781,000–126,000 years ago) a large ice sheet built up across much of the East of England, reaching as far south as St Albans and Chelmsford, blocking the path of the proto-Thames. Glacial meltwater from the Anglian ice sheet caused the Thames to divert southwards and flood the valley of the Mole–Wey river, thus adopting its present route through London.

== Ecology ==
=== Water quality ===
Standard water quality of Mole and its tributaries has improved markedly since the 1990s. In 1990 the Environment Agency assessed 23% of the watercourses as Grade B (good) or better. In 2002 this figure was 60%. Investment in the Sewage Treatment Works in the catchment area has improved the quality of the discharges into the river, and modifications to the runway and apron drainage systems at Gatwick Airport mean that surface water is diverted to aerated pollution control lagoons and balancing ponds for treatments, including acid/alkali neutralisation, before release into the river.

In 1972 a sub-debate on the future cleanliness of the Mole was had by the House of Lords, involving a member of the South-East Strategic Committee of the Thames Conservancy (succeeded by the Environment Agency) and four others. In this it was said, "...I can see no future for [The Mole]. The Mole Valley has been polluted. The Mole where I used to tickle trout in my youth is a drain, and it will remain a drain." Rebuttals included that the Mole is a "charming Surrey steam" and "If Lord Lytton went to fish in the River Mole – and there are still angling clubs there – he would find that he would still be able to catch a trout".

Highly polluting discharges have become less common but have taken place since 2000. In 2003, Gatwick Airport Ltd pleaded guilty to charges of allowing chemical pollution to enter the River Mole after a detergent, used to clean rubber and oil from the runway, was washed into Crawters Brook by airport workers. The Environment Agency estimated that up to 5200 fish of 14 different species were killed as the pollution drained downstream. The airport was fined £30,000 by Lewes Crown Court. In May 2003, sewage leaking from a pump operated by Thames Water leaked into the Stanford Brook, killing coarse fish in the Gatwick stream.

Water quality of the River Mole in 2019:

Section	Ecological Status	Chemical Status	Overall Status	Length	Catchment	Channel
Mole (Horley to Hersham)	Moderate	Fail	Moderate	60.133 km (37.365 mi)	151.017 km^{2} (58.308 sq mi)	
Mole (Hersham to R. Thames conf at East Molesey)	Moderate	Fail	Moderate	9.507 km (5.907 mi)	21.803 km^{2} (8.418 sq mi)	Heavily modified

=== Biodiversity ===
The marsh frog (Pelophylax ridibundus, a non-native species introduced from Europe in the 1930s) is now commonly found in the upper Mole and its tributaries around Newdigate and Gatwick. There is no evidence that the presence of the frogs has had a deleterious effect on indigenous amphibians. A second non-native species, the edible frog (Pelophylax kl. esculentus) was introduced to a site at Newdigate in the early 1900s. It has in 2008 been recorded in tributaries of the River Mole at Capel and Brockham.

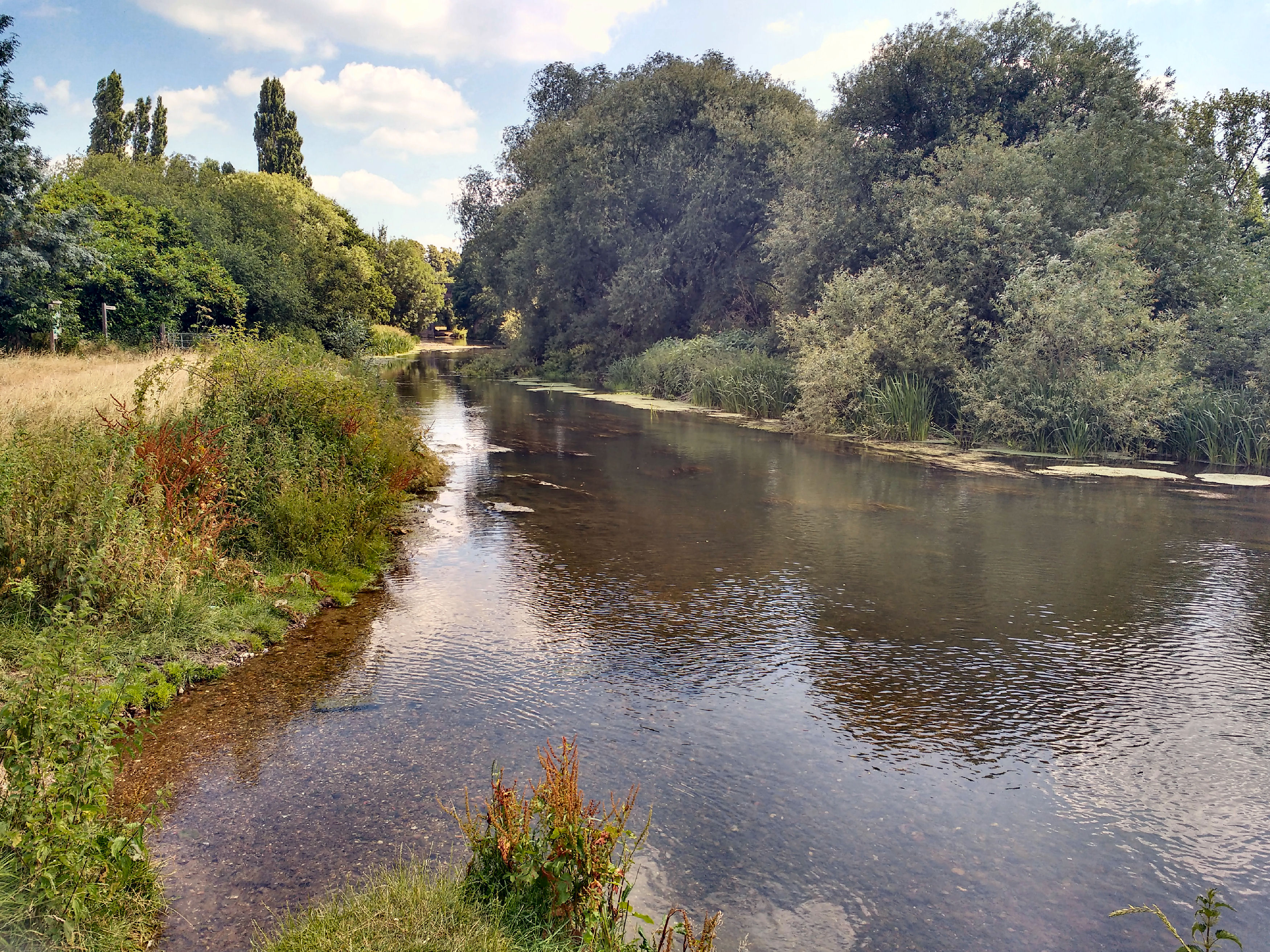
River Mole from Common Meadow, Leatherhead

The River Mole has the most diverse fish population of any river in England. The Gatwick Stream is dominated by coarse fish such as brown trout, brook lamprey, and eel. In 2003, the upper River Mole near Meath Green Lane, Horley, was enhanced to create a gravel spawning area to encourage chub and dace in addition to roach. In 1974 zander, a non-indigenous coarse fish native to Europe, were introduced legally to Old Bury Hill Lake which supplies the Pipp Brook. Zander have been caught in the Lower Mole below Dorking since the 1980s.

In the Mole Gap between Dorking and Leatherhead the river supports populations of chub, dace, barbel, and brown trout. Both barbel and brown trout are extremely sensitive to water quality and pollution. Below Leatherhead the river has historically supported larger predatory fish including chub, perch, pike, and eels, however in recent years chub and eel numbers have begun to decline. North of Esher the old river channel is dominated by floating pennywort, a highly invasive weed, which cuts off all light to the river bed, reducing oxygen levels and resulting in a poor habitat for fish. The Ember flood relief channel has a diverse fish population, including chub, dace, roach, bleak, large pike and barbel. At the confluence of the Mole and the River Thames at Hampton Court Palace it is possible to catch a wide variety of coarse fish species.

The geographical distribution of many species of invertebrate in the river reflects the geology of the catchment area. Viviparid snails and water scorpions (of the genus Nepidae) are commonly found where the river runs over the London Clay. Crayfish are common in areas associated with high alkalinity, particularly around Brockham, and the tributaries which run over the Weald Clay provide an excellent habitat for stoneflies, caddisflies, fast swimming mayflies and riffle beetles. The beautiful demoiselle (Calopteryx virgo) disappeared from the River Mole during the 1960s owing to deteriorating water quality, but has since recolonised. The white-legged damselfly (Platycnemis pennipes) is also found along the river, and the downy emerald (Cordulia aenea) is found between Box Hill and Leatherhead. The Mole is one of only three locations in England where the river shingle beetle (Meotica anglica) is found.

A nationally scarce species which is locally common on the River Mole is the greater dodder (Cuscuta europaea), a parasitic plant.

=== Conservation ===
The Mole catchment area includes twelve Sites of Special Scientific Interest (SSSIs) that include wetland habitats, The Mole Gap forms part of a Special Area of Conservation and is an SSSI of European importance.

The stretch of river between Thorncroft Manor (1 km [0.6 mi] south of Leatherhead) and River Lane in Fetcham has been designated a Local Nature Reserve. Although much of the surrounding land has been taken by residential and commercial development, this section of the Mole supports 20 different mammal species, 20 butterfly species and 15 species of dragonfly. The geology of the local area is complex, since the river leaves the chalk of the Mole Gap at this point and flows over gravel and clay, creating a patchwork of different habitats including scrub, woodland, hedges, banks, and meadows as well as the water itself. The river also provides a corridor for wildlife through the centre of Leatherhead.

The West End Common forms part of the Esher Commons, owned and managed by Elmbridge Borough Council. The River Mole forms the western boundary of the common, flowing past a steep sandy area known locally as The Ledges. Plant species typical of ancient woodland are found in this area, including bluebells (Hyacinthoides non-scriptus), marsh marigolds (Caltha palustris) and golden saxifrages (Chrysosplenium sp.). large bittercress (Cardamine amara) and the non-native Himalayan balsam (Impatiens glandulifera).

Molesey Heath Local Nature Reserve lies on the west bank of the Mole, west of the Island Barn Reservoir. The Heath is an area of rough scrubland and, despite its name, is a reclaimed landfill site hence its large but artificial mound and small plateau. The site is a rich habitat for birds including the redshank and little ringed plover.

== Geology ==
=== Upper Mole ===
The Mole rises south of Rusper in West Sussex, where an outcrop of the Hastings Beds sandstone dips below the impermeable Weald Clay. From the source to Dorking, the river drains an area of 340 km^{2} (130 sq mi), of which approximately 60% is on Wealden or Atherfield Clay, 20% is on Tunbridge Wells Sand and 20% is on greensand. Brickearth deposits are common in the valley around Betchworth and east of Dorking.

The upper Mole catchment is dominated by a single broad terrace, which runs continuously from Tilgate Forest to the entry to the Mole Gap. Above Meath Green (near Horley), the terrace corresponds to the flood plain of the river, however from this point downstream to Brockham, the river cuts a narrow trench no more than 150 m (160 yd) wide. A similar trench is runs up several of the Mole's tributaries, notably along Deanoak Brook which follows a local strike. The presence of the trench protects the land from flooding, rendering it suitable for agriculture.

=== Mole Gap ===
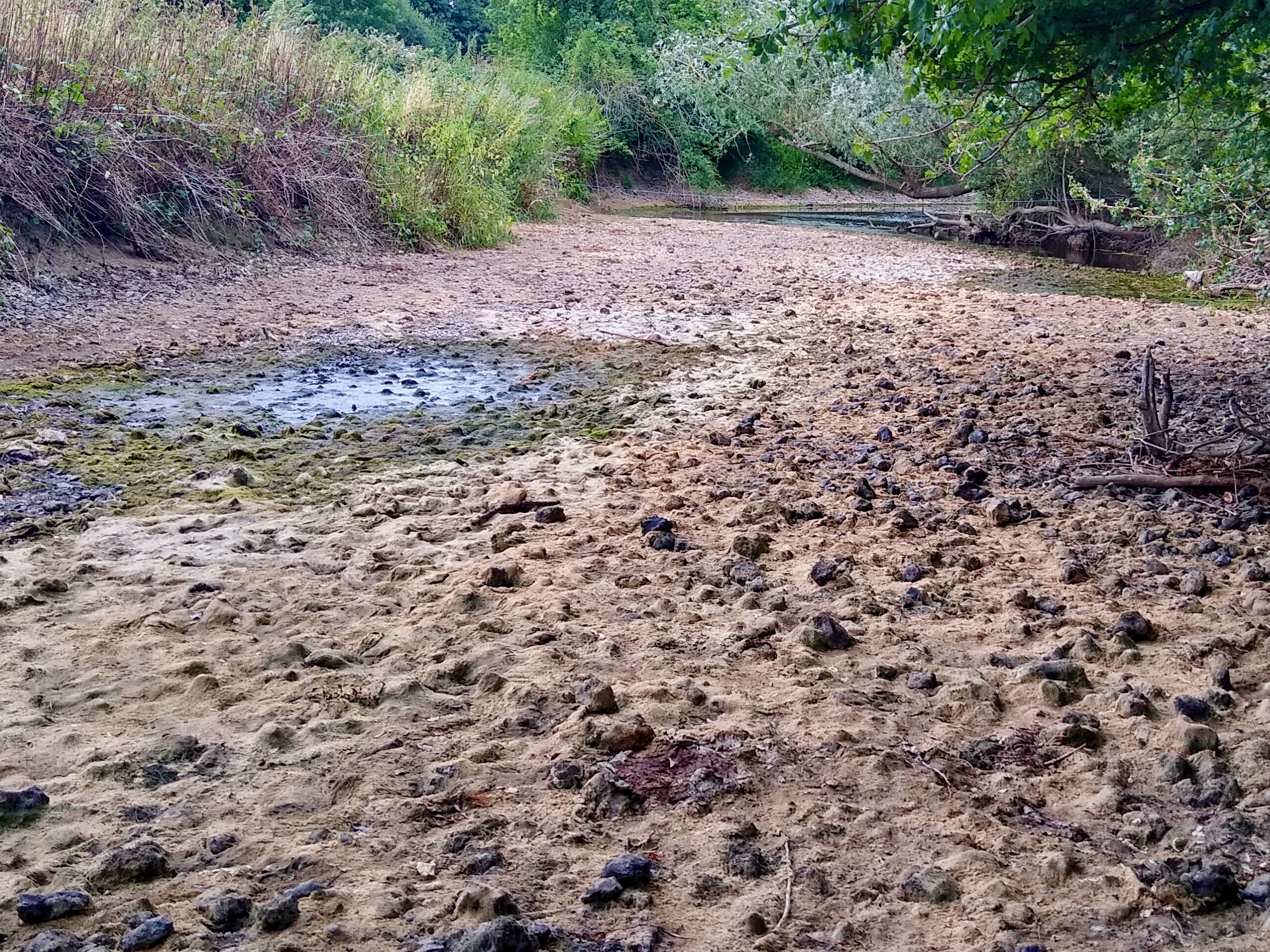
The dry channel of the River Mole in Norbury Park in July 2022. The main flow has ceased leaving isolated shallow pools.

Between Dorking and Leatherhead the Mole cuts a steep-sided valley through the North Downs, creating a 170-metre-high (560 ft) river cliff on the western flank of Box Hill. The bedrock is permeable chalk and the water table lies permanently below the level of the riverbed, allowing water to drain out of the river through swallow holes in the bed and banks. The amount of water lost from the river is significant and in very hot summers the channel can become dry between Mickleham and Thorncroft Manor; this was recorded most recently in 1949, 1976, 2022 and 2026. At Leatherhead, the river leaves the chalk and flows across impermeable London Clay. At this point, the water table rises enough for the water to flow back into the main river channel.

In a survey in 1958, the geologist C. C. Fagg identified 25 active swallow holes between Dorking and Mickleham; the majority were only a few centimetres in diameter and were located in the vertical banks of the river below the water line. Most holes were difficult to observe in times of normal or heavy flow and were susceptible to silting up as new holes were continually being formed. A few much larger swallow holes were also observed separated from the main river by a channel of about a metre. About six of these larger swallow holes were found to the west of the Burford Bridge Hotel, along the course of the A24 Mickleham Bypass during its construction in 1936. Initially the surveyors tried to fill the holes with rubble to prevent the foundations of the new road subsiding. However this proved to be impractical and they were instead covered by concrete domes, up to 18 m in diameter, each fully supported by the surrounding chalk and provided with a manhole and access shaft to allow periodic inspection. In the late 1960s the domes were reopened and inspected and the alluvium in the largest swallow hole was observed to have subsided by 1.5 metres (4 ft 11 in) under the centre of one of the domes. When the Dorking to Leatherhead railway was constructed in 1859, a fossilised swallow hole was discovered in the cutting at the south end of Box Hill & Westhumble railway station, suggesting that even in its early history, the river had swallow holes.

The author Daniel Defoe, who attended school in Dorking and probably grew up in the village of Westhumble, described the swallow holes in the River Mole in his book A tour thro' the Whole Island of Great Britain (first published in 1724):

...the current of the river being much obstructed by the interposition of those hills, called Box Hill ... it forces the waters as it were to find their way through as well as they can; and in order to do this, beginning, I say, where the river comes close to the foot of the precipice of Box-Hill, called the Stomacher, the waters sink insensibly away, and in some places are to be seen (and I have seen them) little channels which go out on the sides of the river, where the water in a stream not so big as would fill a pipe of a quarter of an inch diameter, trills away out of the river, and sinks insensibly into the ground. In this manner it goes away, lessening the stream for above a mile, near two, and these they call the Swallows.

— Daniel Defoe (1724)

Not all of the water removed from the river by the swallow holes is returned to the channel at Leatherhead. The chalk aquifer also feeds the springs at the southern end of Fetcham Mill Pond, which have never been known to run dry. A survey in March 1883 estimated that the Fetcham springs were producing about 3.6 million imperial gallons (16,000 m^{3}) every day. A second survey in 1948 estimated that the same springs were yielding about 5 million imperial gallons (23,000 m^{3}) a day. The water table in the chalk of the Wey Gap is significantly higher than might be expected from natural rainwater percolation alone. It has been suggested that a proportion of the excess water originates from the Mole Gap.

=== Lower Mole ===
At Leatherhead the river leaves the chalk bedrock, moving onto London Clay. The river meanders across an alluvial plain between 400 and 800 m (440–870 yd) wide towards Cobham, where it begins to descend to a lower flood plain, which broadens as the river turns in an axehead meander. At the east end of Painshill Park, the flood plain narrows into a trench about 60 m (66 yd) wide, in which the river runs northwards for 6.5 km (4.0 mi) towards Hersham, where the river enters the flood plain of the River Thames.

Between Cobham and Esher, the Mole's historic courses have deposited gravel on top of the London Clay. The depth of the deposits generally varies from 2.5 to 7 m (8–23 ft); the lower layers are generally highly compacted and cemented together with brick-red iron oxide, whereas the upper layers are loosely packed with angular flints and sand. Remains of a further gravel terrace, containing cherts and flints to a depth of 4 m (13 ft), line the east side of St George's Hill.

== History ==
=== Etymology ===
The river is first recorded in the Red Book of Thorney in AD 983 as Emen and in the AD 1005 Cartulary of the Abbey of Eynsham as both Emen and Æmen. Variations in the name are recorded throughout the Middle Ages and the river appears as Amele in the Domesday Book of 1086, and subsequently as Emele in 12th- and 13th-century Court Rolls. This name is probably derived from the Old English word æmen meaning misty or causing mists, and the name of the River Ember probably has its origins in this name. (Note: The prefix of the former hundred and present borough of Elmbridge, which is referred to as Emley Bridge in some 19th-century records, probably also has its origins in the Old English word æmen.)

The name Mole does not appear until the 16th century, first occurring as Moule in Harrison's Description of Britain of 1577. The antiquarian William Camden uses the Latinized form Molis in the 1586 edition of Britannia and Michael Drayton is the first to use Mole in his poem Poly-Olbion published in 1613. In John Speed's 1611 map of Surrey this stretch of the river is denoted by a series of hills accompanied by the legend "The river runneth under". However the river's name is unlikely to have derived from this behaviour: The Oxford Dictionary of English Place Names suggests that Mole either comes from the Latin mola (a mill) or is a back-formation from Molesey (Mul's island). In John Rocque's 1768 map of Surrey, the name Moulsey River is used.

=== Archaeology ===
In common with much of the rest of the Weald, the earliest evidence of human settlement along the Upper Mole is from the Mesolithic Period (20,000–7000 BC). Mesolithic sites at Wonham, Flanchford and Sidlow. Finds at Wonham include arrowheads and a plano-convex knife. The Lower Mole appears to have been settled during the same period and a flint axe dating from Mesolithic period found on spit of land close to River Mole in Cobham in 1965. Remains of a flat-bottomed dug-out canoe were found at the confluence of the Mole and Thames in 1877 by a local boatman. The canoe is preserved at the Pitt Rivers Museum in Oxford.

The Mole Gap and North Downs do not appear to have been settled until the late Stone Age: A large axe, typical of a "rough-out" axe produced during the Neolithic period, which was discovered in 1952 during building work in Westhumble, A flint mine of the same period has been discovered at East Horsley along with Neolithic flakes of flint at Fetcham and Headley Heath.

Significant Bronze Age finds include a bronze sword found close to the river north of Amberley Farm near Charlwood and a small hoard of weaponry consisting of two palstave axes and a scabbard chape was discovered in 2003 in Norbury Park close to Ham Bank.

=== Navigation ===
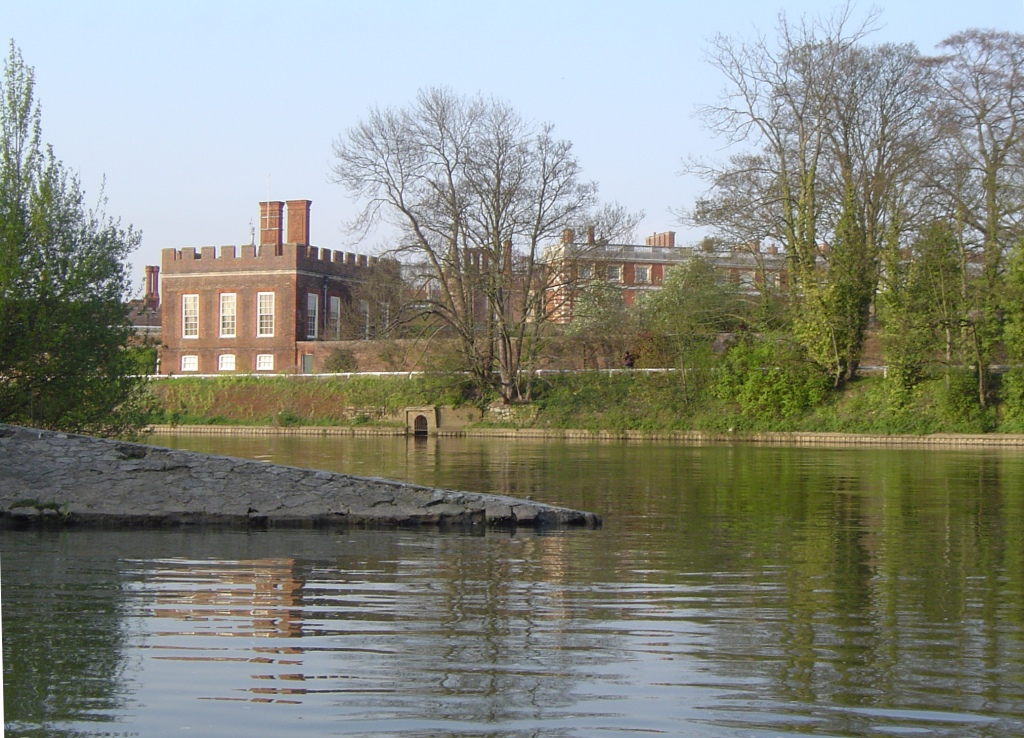
Confluence of the Mole with the Thames opposite Hampton Court

It is not clear to what extent the Mole was used for navigation in the past: In the late 13th century, Thorncroft Manor (south of Leatherhead) purchased a shout, a type of boat up to 16 metres (52 ft) in length used to carry produce to market and it has been suggested that stone cut from quarries in Reigate was transported to London via the river.

During the 17th century, two bills came before parliament to make sections of the river navigable. The first, in 1663, was passed by the House of Commons but was defeated in the House of Lords. During the following year (1664), an act was passed by both Houses of Parliament to make the River Mole navigable from Reigate to the River Thames, but was never executed. The only Surrey river to have been made fully navigable is the combined lower section of the River Wey.

In 1798 William Marshall advocated the canalisation of a short stretch of the River Mole between Betchworth and Dorking to facilitate the movement of chalk from quarry to market. In 1810 the engineer John Rennie proposed a canal linking the River Medway to Portsmouth which was to have a branch to London following the Mole for much of its length. Between 1825 and 1828 the architect and civil engineer Nicholas Wilcox Cundy proposed a Grand Imperial Ship Canal from Deptford to Chichester passing through the Mole Gap, however he was unable to attract sufficient financial interest in his scheme.

Today the Mole is navigable for the 400 m (440 yd) from the confluence with the River Thames to Molember Weir at East Molesey where there is a private mooring facility. The river may be paddled all year by canoe between Brockham and Fetcham with an appropriate licence from the British Canoe Union.

=== Second World War defences ===
During the Second World War several sites along the course of the Mole were fortified for the defence of London against invasion from the south. GHQ Line B ran along the North Downs from Farnham and Guildford, crossing the Mole Gap to the north of Dorking and following the river to Horley. Between Betchworth and Box Hill, the north bank of the River Mole was stabilised and made steeper to prevent wheeled vehicles from crossing. At Boxhill Farm, where access to the river from the north bank was required for the herd of dairy cows, a row of twelve concrete cylinders were cast as an anti-tank measure. Gun mounts were also installed to protect both Boxhill and Deepdene bridges and several pillboxes were installed. An anti-tank ditch was dug from the Stepping Stones eastwards across the fields belonging to Bradley Farm (now Denbies vineyard).

The river crossing at Sidlow Bridge was heavily defended and a line of pill boxes was constructed on the north bank of the river. Concrete anti-tank dragon's teeth were built on both sides of the river, a short distance upstream of the bridge, as an obstacle to armoured vehicles.

== Crossings of the Mole ==
=== Mole Gap ===
The North Downs Way crosses the river at Box Hill via seventeen hexagonal stepping stones, which are frequently submerged after heavy rainfall. The current stones were dedicated in September 1946 by the then Prime Minister Clement Attlee, replacing those destroyed during the Second World War as an anti-invasion measure. The location is popular with anglers and families, but swimming is strongly discouraged as the water is polluted in places. The stones give their name to the pub in the nearby village of Westhumble.

When the Burford Bridge was rebuilt in 1937, excavations revealed a "flint-surfaced approach to [a] ford at low level having all the signs of Roman workmanship" suggesting that Stane Street (which ran from London to Chichester via Dorking) crossed the river at this point. In Defoe's time, there was a footbridge at this point, but carts and waggons had to cross the river by a ford.

=== Leatherhead ===
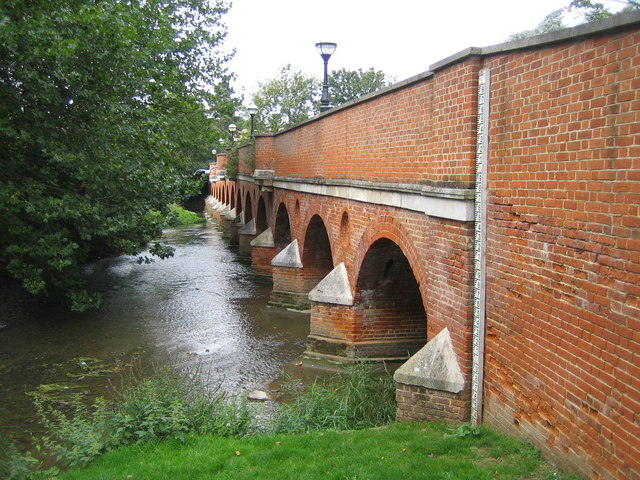
Leatherhead Town Bridge across the River Mole

There are three listed bridges in Leatherhead of which the 14 arch Leatherhead Town Bridge is the oldest. The first bridge on this site was probably constructed during the late Middle Ages and was rebuilt and enlarged by the county surveyor, George Gwilt in 1782–83. The bridge is a long structure of 14 segmental arches resting on low piers, finished in red brick in Flemish bond, with some Portland stone dressing.

A few metres downstream of Leatherhead Bridge stands the Grade II listed railway viaduct which carries the Leatherhead to Dorking line over the river. The bridge was constructed in 1867 and, at the insistence of Thomas Grissell the landowner, was given lavish architectural treatment.

The single-span Shell Bridge stands in the grounds of Thorncroft Manor, to the south of the Town Centre. The bridge was constructed as an ornamental feature in parkland laid out by Capability Brown in the late 18th century. The bridge is largely composed of flint and has a large inverted scallop shell in the place of the keystone and similar shells in the spandrels at each side. The bridge was renovated and strengthened in 1999 by a group of Canadian engineers working on the Terra Nove project. The restoration project was dedicated to the memory of the Canadian servicemen who were billeted in the manor during the Second World War.

=== Cobham ===
A wooden bridge is thought to have existed on the site of Cobham Bridge since the 12th century, the upkeep of which was the responsibility of the adjacent landowners. The present bridge was constructed by George Gwilt in 1792, after responsibility for maintenance had been transferred to the county council by Act of Parliament. The bridge has nine low arches and is primarily built of red brick with stone coping. The parapets were rebuilt in 1914 and the structure was given a Grade II listing in 1953.

List of crossings of the River Mole (from mouth to source)
Name	Grid Reference	Type	Road/Railway	Notes
Confluence with River Thames	TQ156683			East Molesey, Surrey
Hampton Court Railway Station	TQ155683	Railway	Hampton Court Branch Line	
Hampton Court Way Bridge	TQ154683	Road	A309	
Tanner's Bridge	TQ145676	Footbridge		
Hersham Viaduct	TQ130656	Railway		
Albany Bridge	TQ130645	Road	A244	Named after the Duchess of Albany (resident of Claremont). Original wooden Victorian bridge replaced by a stone parapet bridge in 1907 and the present concrete bridge dates from 1965.
Burhill Bridge	TQ103623	Road		A multi-span composite deck supported on steelwork tresses with a total span of 48 m (157 ft) and a main span of 22 m (72 ft) over the river itself. Constructed between January and March 2008, replacing an earlier bridge on the same site.
A3 River Mole Bridge	TQ099609	Road	A3	Opened as part of the A3 Esher Bypass in December 1976.
Cobham Bridge	TQ099605	Road	A245	
Painshill Park Bridge	TQ102602	Footbridge		A part suspended steel and timber deck bridge, spanning 42 metres (138 ft). The bridge was designed by the architect Howard Humphreys and the westernmost section is a drawbridge which may be raised to prevent access to Painshill Park.
Downside Bridge	TQ107595	Road		The medieval bridge was rebuilt by Gwilt in 1786, but was washed away during the September 1968 floods. The present bridge opened in 1971.
Ash Bridge	TQ120590	Bridleway	River Lane, Stoke D'Abernon	Built in 1990 to replace an existing ford.
Cobham Viaduct		Railway	New Guildford Line	The original viaduct was washed away by floods on 15 September 1968.
Lane Viaduct	TQ131581	Road	M25	A seven-span 170 m-long (190 yd) reinforced concrete viaduct, cast in situ in 1983–4.
Stoke D'Abernon Bridge	TQ132580	Road	A245	
Railway Bridge	TQ160565	Railway	Bookham Branch Line	
Railway Bridge	TQ162564			
Waterway Road Bridge	TQ162563	Road	B2122	
Town Bridge	TQ163563			
Thorncroft Bridge	TQ166558			
Young Street Bridge	TQ164552	Road	A246	Concrete girder bridge.
Pressforward Bridge	TQ168544	Road		Built c. 1790, strengthened and refurbished by Surrey County Council in 1990.
Weir Bridge	TQ170537	Road		Grade II listed. Early to mid-19th-century brick bridge with two semi-circular arches and one elliptical arch.
Railway Bridge	TQ165538	Railway	Epsom to Horsham line	
Swanworth Bridge	TQ163534			
Cowslip Bridge	TQ163529	Road		
Railway Bridge	TQ166523	Railway	Epsom to Horsham line	Three arch bridge
Burford Bridge	TQ171519	Road	A24	
Stepping Stones Footbridge	TQ173513	Footbridge	North Downs Way	Erected in 1992 to replace the original bridge presented by the Ramblers' Association in memory of their members who died in the Second World War
Stepping Stones	TQ172512	Ford	North Downs Way	
Deepdene Viaduct	TQ176504	Railway	Guildford to Redhill Line	A five-arch brick viaduct constructed by the Reading, Guildford and Reigate Railway Company in 1847–48.
Castle Mill Footbridge	TQ179502	Footbridge		
Boxhill Bridge	TQ184503	Footbridge		The original road bridge on this site was destroyed during flooding in 1968.
Deepdene Bridge	TQ187504	Road	A25	Opened in 1927 by Henry Cubitt, 2nd Baron Ashcombe.
Borough Bridge (Brockham)	TQ196497	Road		A single track bridge built in 1737 by Richard and Thomas Skilton. The bridge was rebuilt in 1991.
Betchworth Bridge	TQ212495	Road		Single track bridge built in 1842 and refurbished in 1993.
Rice Bridge	TQ223487	Footbridge		
Flanchford Bridge	TQ234480	Road		Flanchford Bridge was severely damaged by flooding in December 2013, but was rebuilt.
Sidlow Bridge	TQ258470	Road	A217	
Lee Street Bridge	TQ269433	Road		
Long Bridge	TQ275425	Road	A23	
London Road Bridge	TQ275424	Road	A23	Built in 1957 as part of the scheme to divert the A23 around the eastern periphery of Gatwick Airport. The bridge has a 15 m (49 ft) span with mass concrete abutments and a pre-stressed concrete deck.
Gatwick Airport	TQ261402	Runway and taxiways		The river passes under the airport in a 425 m (465 yd) long concrete culvert with 50 cm (20 in) thick walls and roof. The culvert was constructed in 1957.
Stafford Bridge	TQ252384	Road		
Granthams Bridge	TQ232372	Road		
Lambs Green Bridge	TQ219371	Road		
Rusper Court Bridge	TQ208362	Bridleway		
Baldhorns Park Bridge	TQ203361	Bridleway		
Source of River Mole	TQ203368			Baldhorns Copse, Rusper, West Sussex

== Watermills ==
Domesday Book listed twenty mills on the River Mole in 1086.

=== Upper Mole ===
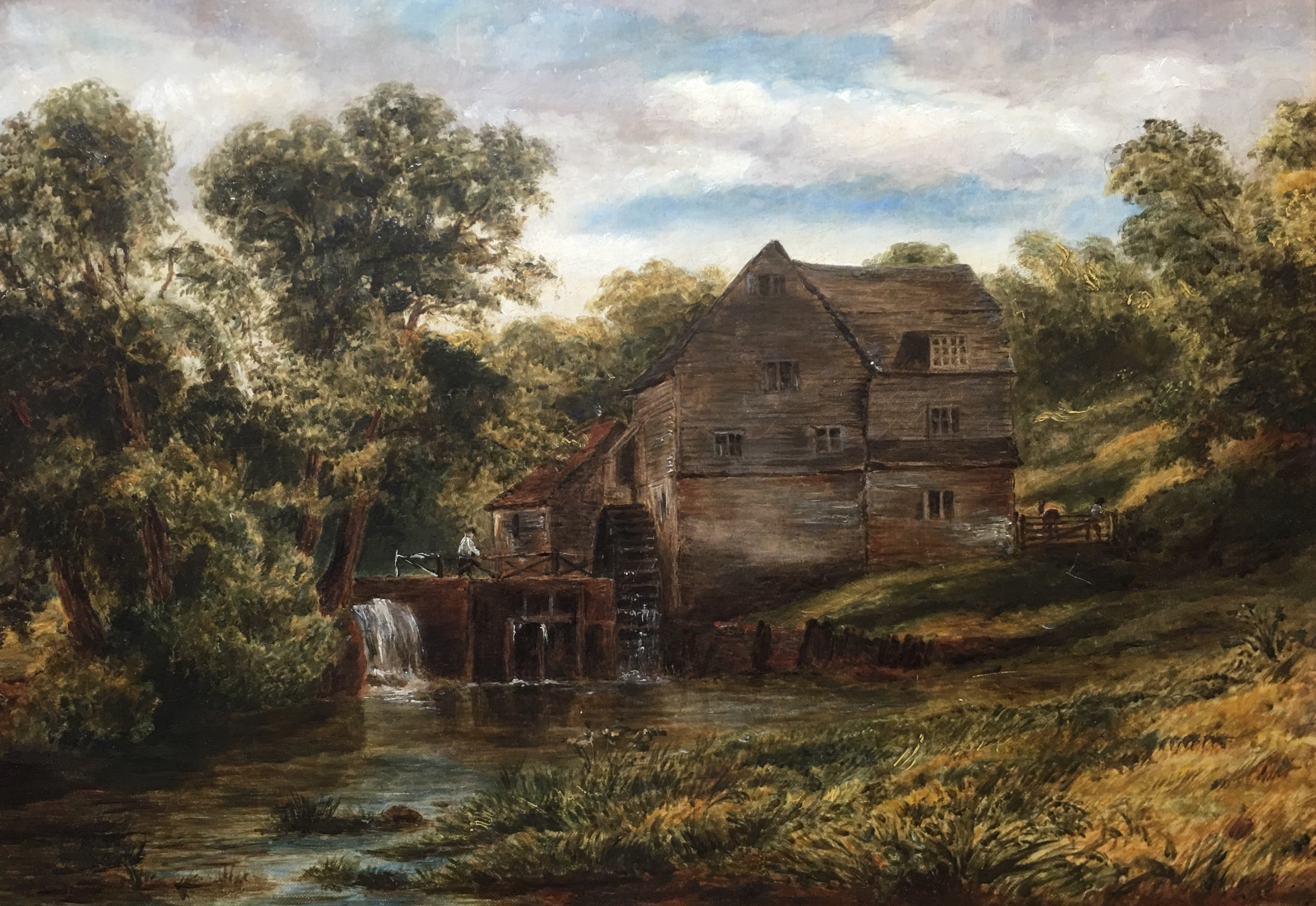
The Mill at Dorking, by Henry Hewitt, a view of Castle Mill in 1869

Horley Mill was first mentioned in a deed of the early 13th century. The most recent mill was demolished in 1959, although the mill house still stands.

The first mill at Sidlow was built during Saxon times. The final mill on the site was demolished in 1790, however remains of the mill leat are still visible.

Mention is made of a mill at Brockham in 1634 and remains of the mill race are still visible.

Castle Mill at Pixham is a Grade II listed building. It was a corn mill, built in the early 19th century, and has been converted into a bed and breakfast hotel.

=== Lower Mole ===
Slyfield Mill near Stoke d'Abernon is first mentioned in Domesday Book. It was used for fulling woollen cloth and milling corn.

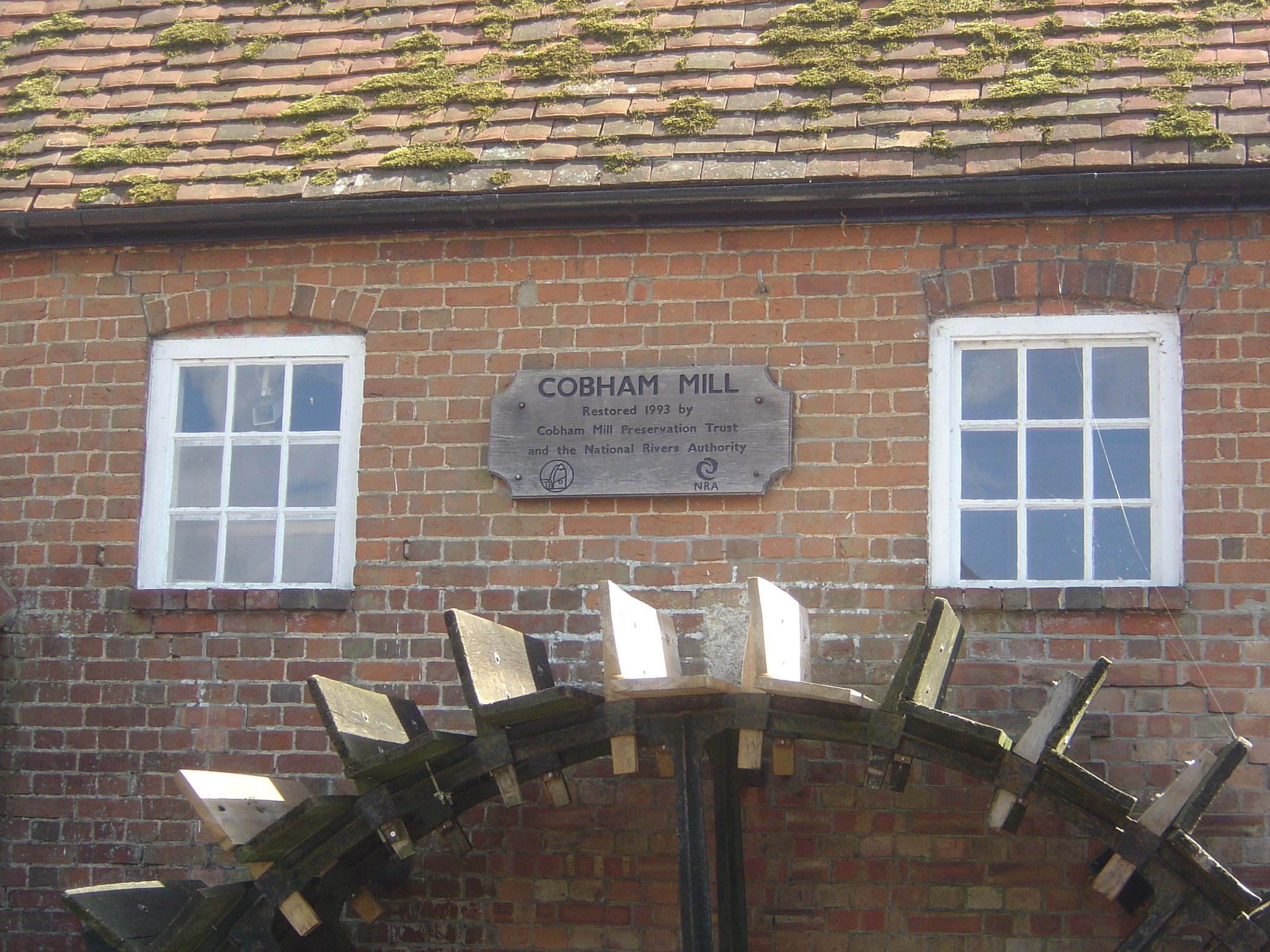
Cobham Mill

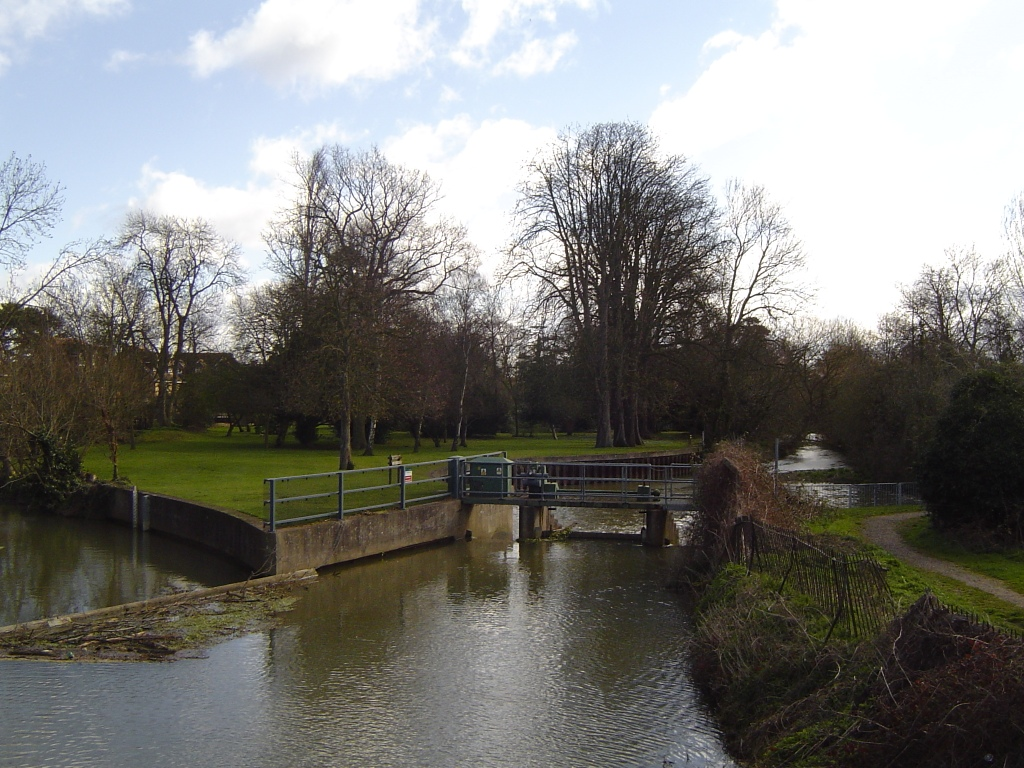
The River Mole where it runs separately from the River Ember - at the site of East Molesey Upper Mill near The Wilderness

Five of the mills mentioned in Domesday Book were in the borough of Elmbridge.

Downside Mill, Cobham was the mill of the manor of Downe. Until the Dissolution of the Monasteries it was owned by Chertsey Abbey. It has been used for many purposes including the processing of corn, paper, iron, tinplate and flock and the generation of electricity. The present building dates from the 18th century but it is inaccessible to the public.

Cobham Mill, downstream of Leatherhead, consisted of two mills used for grinding corn. In 1953 the larger mill was demolished by Surrey County Council to allieviate traffic congestion on Mill Road. The remaining red brick mill dates from the 1822 and was in use until 1928. It was restored to full working order by the Cobham Mill Preservation Trust, and is now open to the public from 2 pm to 5 pm on the second Sunday of each month (between April and October).

Esher Mill also known as Royal Mill was at the end of Mill Road in Lower Green, where there is now an industrial estate. It was used to process corn, brass wire, iron, paper, linoleum, and books. For many years there may have been two mills on the site for corn grinding and industrial use. There were a series of fires over a century and after the last in 1978 the buildings were demolished.

East Molesey Upper Mill was associated with the manor of Molesey Matham. It was used to produce gunpowder from the time of the Commonwealth until about 1780. The island where it stood now forms part of the ornamental gardens of a housing development called "The Wilderness".

East Molesey Lower Mill, also known as Sterte Mill, was associated with the manor of Molesey Prior. During the Commonwealth it was used for gunpowder manufacture, but after the restoration of the monarchy in 1660 it reverted to corn milling. An old timber structure was replaced by a brick building in the 1820s which can be seen from the bridge over the Ember in Hampton Court Way.

In addition there was Ember Mill, which stood on the banks of the old course of the River Ember near Hampton Court Way.

== River Ember Flood Relief Channel and confluence with the Thames ==
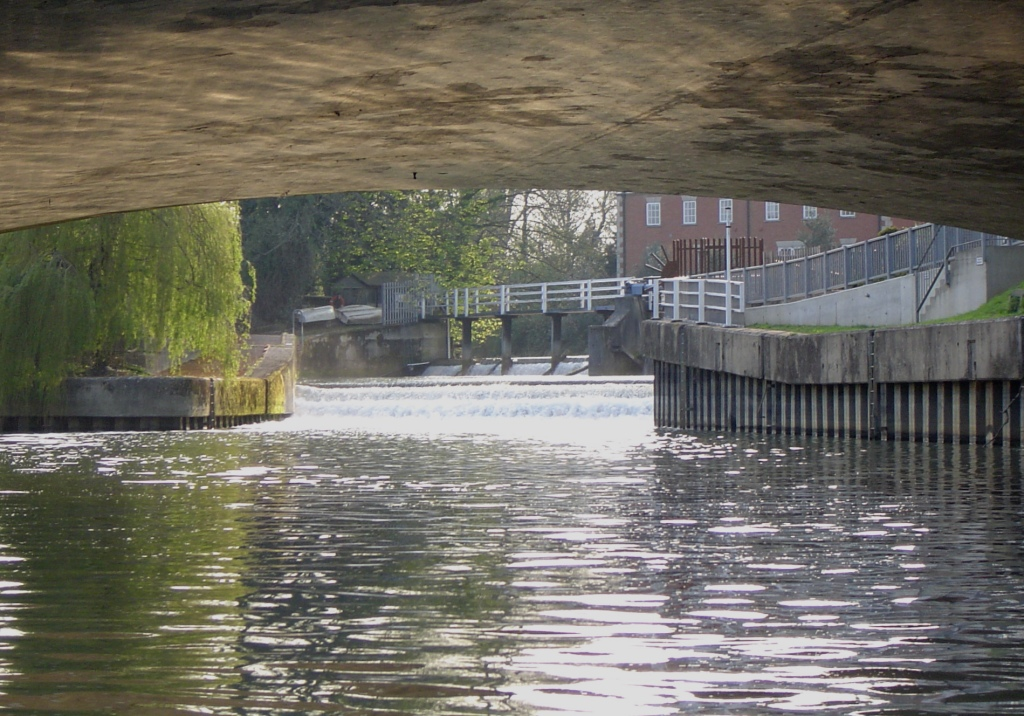
Confluence of the Mole and Ember with the Hampton Court Way crossing in the foreground

The River Mole originally flowed into the River Thames at the point where the present Hampton Court bridge now crosses the Thames (approximately 500 m upstream of the present confluence, on the reach above Teddington Lock).

However, during the early 1930s, when Hampton Court Way and the bridge were built, the River Mole was redirected to flow into the River Ember and both rivers now enter the Thames in a single widened and straightened channel once occupied only by the River Ember. There have been further alterations to the courses of these two rivers in a major flood prevention scheme since serious flooding in the area in 1947 and 1968.

== Literature ==
The river has captured the imagination of several authors and poets, particularly since in very hot summers the river channel can become dry between Dorking and Leatherhead (most recently during the 1976 drought).

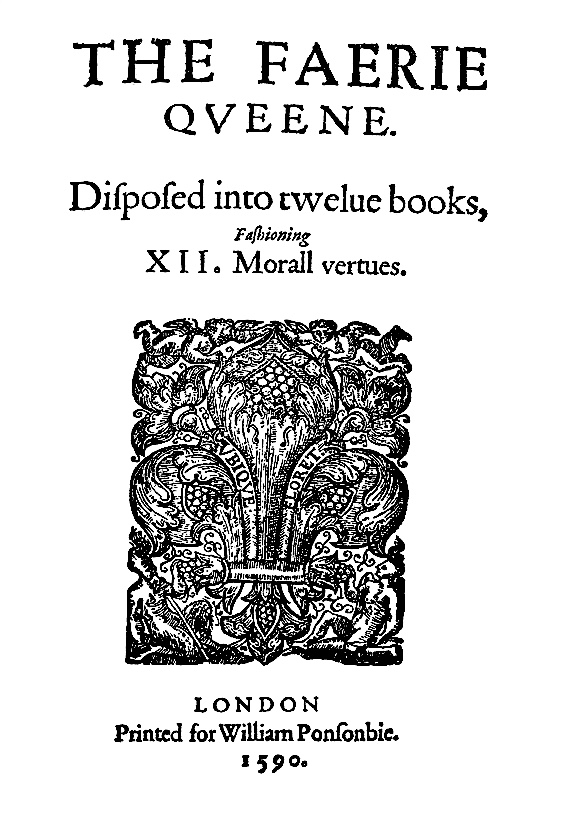
Title-page of The Faerie Queene by Edmund Spenser, published in 1590.

In The Faerie Queene (first published in 1590) Edmund Spenser wrote of the river:

And Mole, that like a nousling mole doth make
His way still under ground till Thamis he overtake.

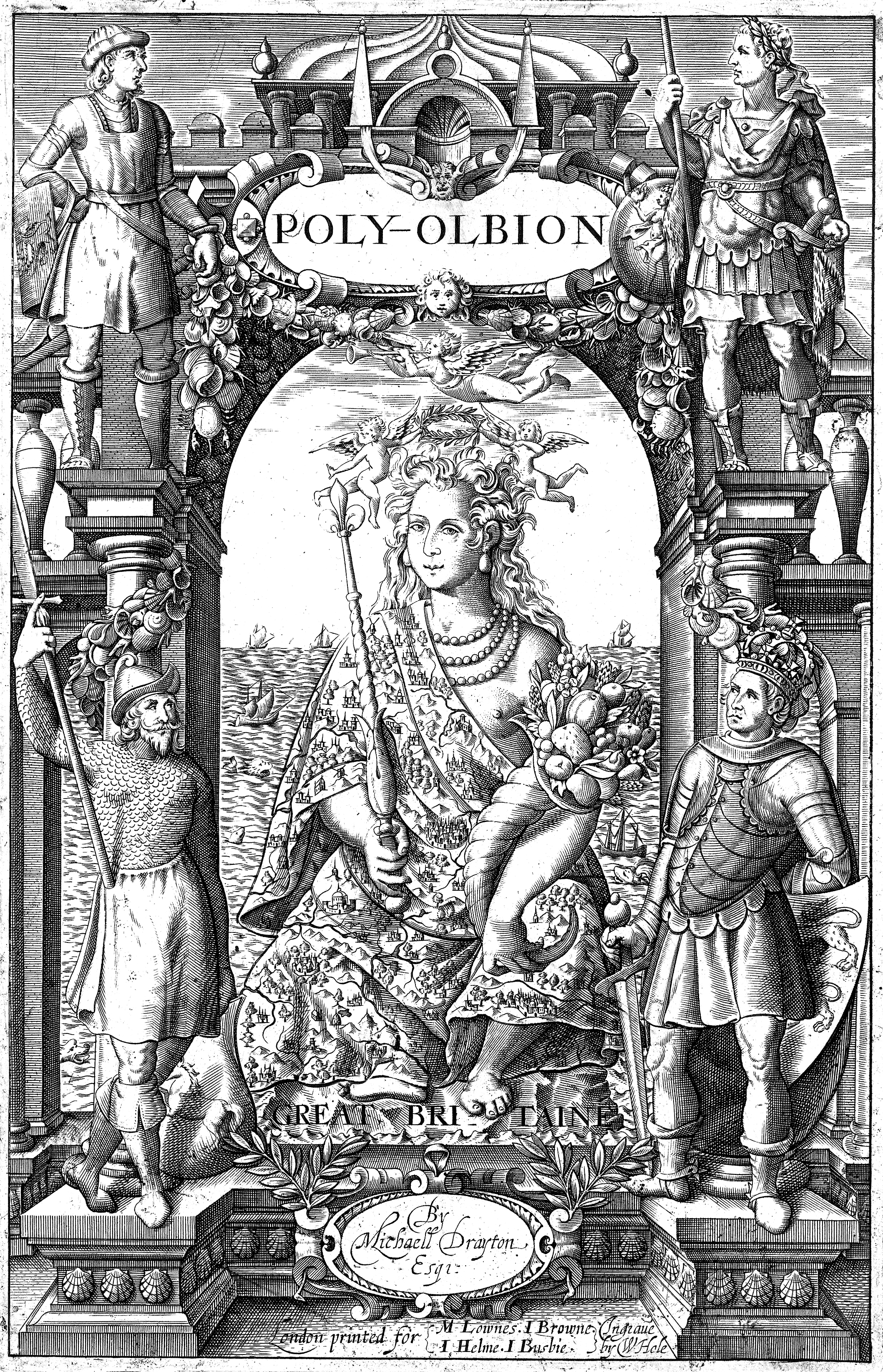
Title-page of Poly-Olbion by Michael Drayton, published in 1612.

In Poly-Olbion (first published in 1612) the poet Michael Drayton described the journey taken by the River Thames to the sea:

As still his goodly traine yet every houre increast,
And from the Surrian shores cleer Wey came down to meet
His Greatnes, whom the Tames so gratiously doth greet
That with the Fearne-crown'd Flood he Minion-like doth play:
Yet is not this the Brook, entiseth him to stay.
But as they thus, in pompe, came sporting on the shole,
Gainst Hampton-Court he meets the soft and gentle Mole.
Whose eyes so pierc't his breast, that seeming to foreslowe
The way which he so long intended was to go,
With trifling up and down, he wandreth here and there;
And that he in her sight, transparent might appeare,
Applyes himselfe to Fords, and setteth his delight,
On that which might make him gratious in her sight.

But Tames would hardly on: oft turning back to show,
For his much loved Mole how loth he was to go.
The mother of the Mole, old Holmsdale, likewise beares
Th'affection of her childe, as ill as they do theirs:
But Mole respects her words, as vaine and idle dreames,
Compar'd with that high joy, to be belov'd of Tames:
And head-long holds her course, his company to win.
Mole digs her selfe a path, by working day and night
(According to her name, to shew her nature right)
And underneath the Earth, for three miles space doth creep:
Till gotten out of sight, quite from her mothers keep,
Her foreintended course the wanton Nymph doth run;
As longing to imbrace old Tame and Isis son...

He writes in the appendix to Song XVII

This Mole runnes into the earth, about a mile from Darking in Surrey, and after some two miles sees the light againe, which to be certaine hath been affirmed by Inhabitants thereabout reporting triall made of it.

John Milton (c. 1562–1647) described the river as

sullen Mole that runneth underneath

In a similar vein, Alexander Pope (1688–1744) wrote in his poem Windsor Forest (first published 1713)

And sullen Mole that hides his diving flood

Robert Bloomfield (1766–1823) writes the following lines about the Mole Valley in his 1806 poem Wild Flowers.

Sweet Health, I seek thee! Hither bring
Thy balm that softens human ills;
Come on the long drawn clouds that fling
Their shadows o'er the Surry-Hills.
Yon green-topt hills, and far away
Where late as now I freedom stole,
And spent one dear delicious day
On thy wild banks romantic Mole.

Ay there's the scene! Beyond the sweep
Of London's congregated cloud,
The dark-brow'd wood, the headlong steep,
And valley paths without a crowd!
Here Thames I watch thy flowing tides,
Thy thousand sails am proud to see;
But where the Mole all silent glides
Dwells Peace - and Peace is wealth to me.

Extract from The River Mole or Emlyn Stream by Mary Drinkwater Bethune, which was published in 1839. (Note: Mary Drinkwater Bethune was the daughter of the English army officer and military historian Colonel John Drinkwater Bethune, who lived at Thorncroft Manor, Leatherhead, from 1836 to 1844. Mary Drinkwater Bethune married Norman Uniacke at St George's, Hanover Square in September 1844.)

Who may count back that forgotten time
When first the waters forced an outlet here:
When the foundations of these stedfast hills
Were shaken, and the long imprisoned stream
Flowed through the yawning chasm? That awful day
Yet leaves its trace. The waters find their way,
Now laughing in the sun - now swallowed up
In caverns pervious to their course alone,
They leave their channel dry, and hide awhile
Their silent flow; like bitter tears, unshed
From the dim eye, before a careless world
Unheeding of our grief; but swelling still
In the full heart, which leaves unsoothed, unseen,
And broods o'er ruined hopes, and days gone by.

== Tributaries ==
The major tributaries of the River Mole are the Ifield Brook, Gatwick Stream, Earlswood Brook, Pipp Brook and The Rye, which drains Ashtead. A full list of the tributaries is given in the table below.

Table of tributaries of the River Mole
Left	Right
Confluence with River Thames at East Molesey
	River Ember as tributary
Dead River	
	River Ember distributary
Cobham
Bookham Brook	
	Pachesham Brook
	The Rye
Fetcham Mill Stream	
Mole Gap
Pipp Brook	
Tanner's Brook	
	Shag Brook
Gad Brook	
	Wallace Brook
Leigh Brook	
	Baldhorns Brook
Deanoak Brook	
Sidlow
	Earlswood Brook
	Salfords Stream
	Burstow Stream
Spencer's Gill	
Hookwood Common Stream	
	Gatwick Stream
Mans Brook	
Runway of Gatwick Airport
	Crawter's Brook
	Ifield Brook
	Reubens Gill
Source at Rusper, West Sussex

== Distributary ==
- River Ember

== See also ==
- List of rivers in England
- Tributaries of the River Thames

== Notes ==
Next confluence upstream	River Thames	Next confluence downstream
Longford River, Water Gallery (north)	River Mole and River Ember	The Rythe (south)
