= The Rye (brook) =

Stream in Surrey, England

Coordinates: 51.3042°N 0.3550°W

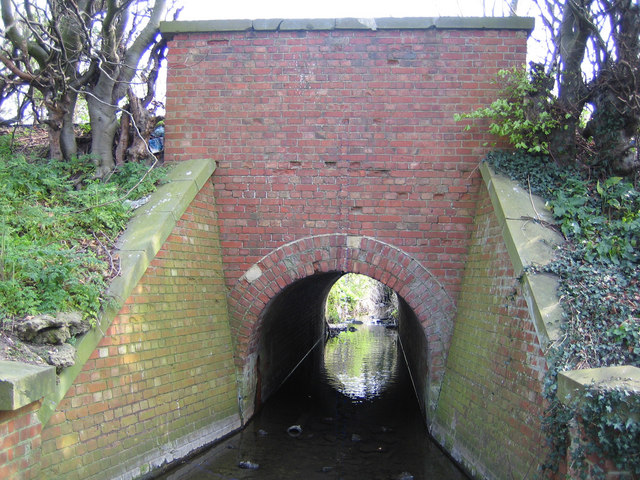
- The Rye at Gutters Bridge, Leatherhead

Location
- Country: England
- Region: South East
- District: Mole Valley District
- City: Leatherhead

Physical characteristics
- Source: Ashtead Common
- Mouth: River Mole
  - location: Leatherhead

The Rye is a stream rising east of Ashtead and flowing into the River Mole near Leatherhead, Surrey.

== Course ==
The Rye Brook flows westwards across Ashtead Common, through the Ashtead Common National Nature Reserve, managed by the City of London Corporation. For much of its course the brook follows a straight channelled course which was dug during the Second World War in order to drain the surrounding land so that it could be used for agriculture. Under a recent (2005) initiative by the City of London Corporation, parts of the course have been remodelled. The remodelling includes meandering and reprofiling the riverbed, banks and adjacent land to create a more natural setting, in order to create a wetland habitat that will encourage a diverse wildlife.

== Water quality ==
The Environment Agency measures the water quality of the river systems in England. Each is given an overall ecological status, which may be one of five levels: high, good, moderate, poor and bad. There are several components that are used to determine this, including biological status, which looks at the quantity and varieties of invertebrates, angiosperms and fish. Chemical status, which compares the concentrations of various chemicals against known safe concentrations, is rated good or fail.

Water quality of the Rye in 2019:

| Section | Ecological Status | Chemical Status | Overall Status | Length | Catchment | Channel |
|---|---|---|---|---|---|---|
| Rye Brook at Ashtead | Moderate | Fail | Moderate | 1.977 km (1.228 mi) | 16.105 km^{2} (6.218 sq mi) | |
