= Godstow Bridge =

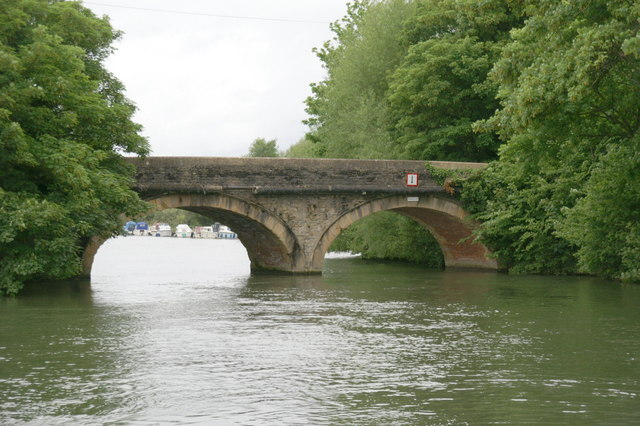
- Coordinates: 51.7793°N 1.3012°W
- Carries: minor road
- Crosses: River Thames
- Locale: Godstow, Oxfordshire
- Maintained by: Oxfordshire County Council
- Heritage status: Grade II listed building

Characteristics
- Design: arch
- Material: Stone
- Height: 8 feet 5 inches (2.57 m)
- No. of spans: 2

Listed Building – Grade II
- Official name: Little Godstow Bridge
- Designated: 28 June 1972
- Reference no.: 1116442

Listed Building – Grade II
- Official name: Godstow Bridge
- Designated: 12 January 1954
- Reference no.: 1369373

Location
- Interactive map of Godstow Bridge

Godstow Bridge is a road bridge across the River Thames in England at Godstow near Oxford. The bridge is just upstream of Godstow Lock on the reach to King's Lock and carries a minor road between Wolvercote and Wytham.

The bridge is in two parts. The older part, sometimes called Little Godstow Bridge, crosses the original course of the river and weir stream near The Trout Inn, a well-known public house. This stone bridge was in existence in 1692 and was probably the one held by the Royalists against Parliamentarians in 1645, during the English Civil War. It has two arches, one pointed and the other round, and was rebuilt in 1892. The newer part was built across the new lock cut in 1792, and has two brick-lined round arches. The north arch may be of medieval origin and the south arch was also rebuilt in 1892. Both parts of the bridge are listed at Grade II, as is a footbridge from The Trout Inn.

The importance of the bridge was reduced by the construction of the Oxford by-pass and the A34 bridge a short distance upstream.

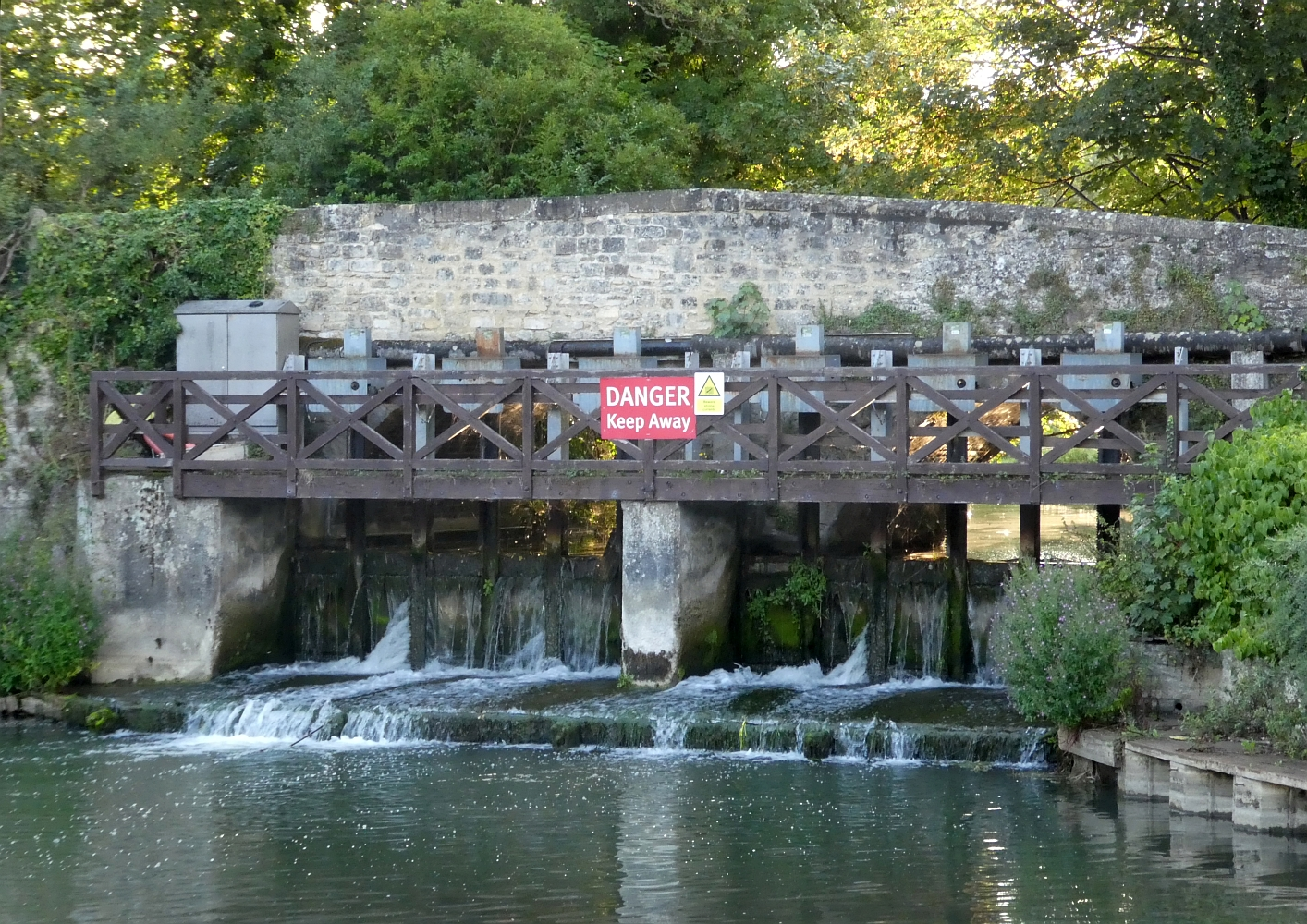
Little Godstow Bridge and weir

== See also ==
- Crossings of the River Thames

Next bridge upstream	River Thames	Next bridge downstream
A34 Road Bridge	Godstow Bridge; Grid reference SP4840209215	Medley Footbridge
