= Cassington =

Village and civil parish in England

Coordinates: 51.793°N 1.343°W

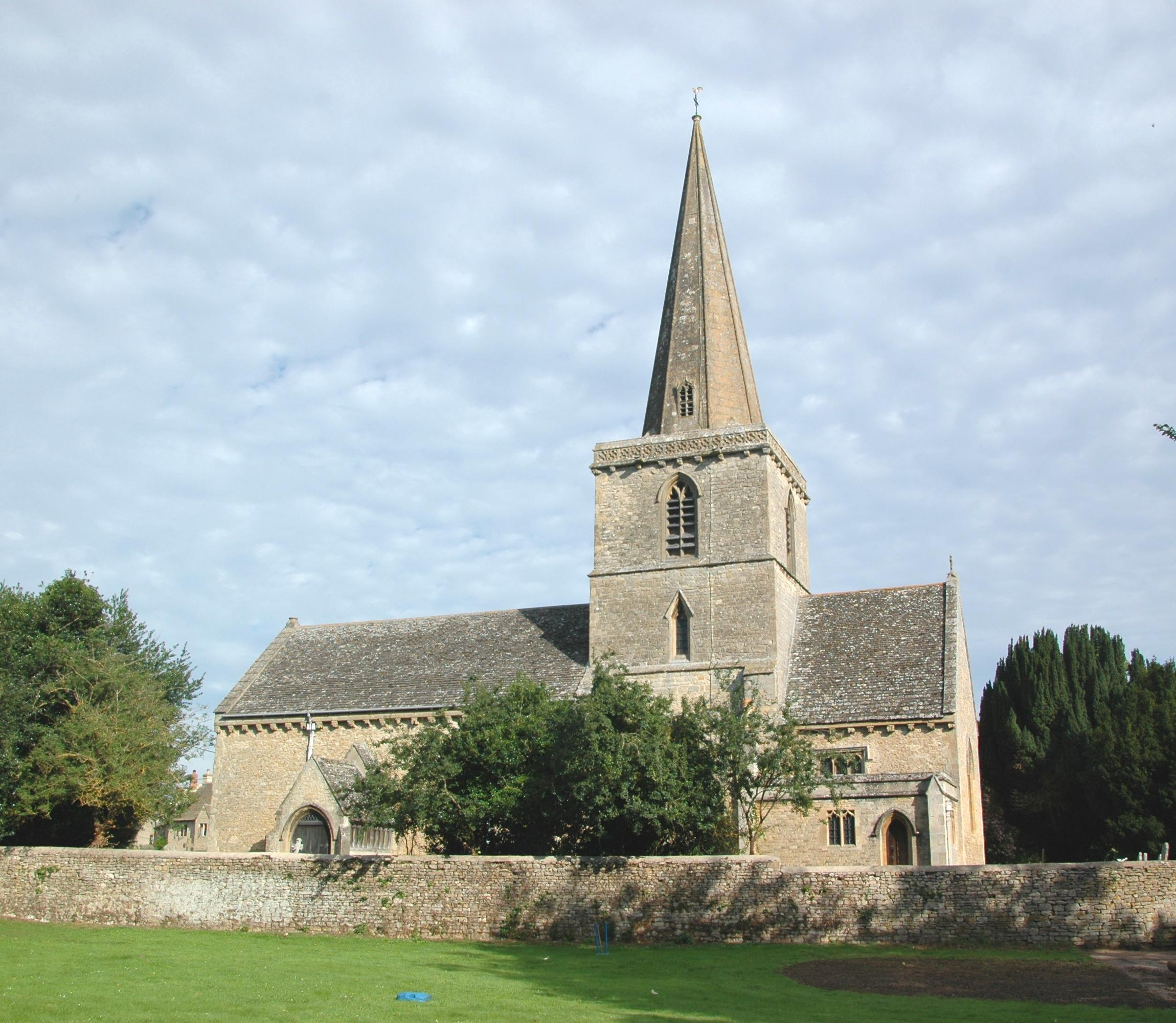
- St Peter's parish church

- Location within Oxfordshire
- Population: 750 (2011 Census)
- OS grid reference: SP4510
- Civil parish: Cassington
- District: West Oxfordshire
- Shire county: Oxfordshire
- Region: South East
- Country: England
- Sovereign state: United Kingdom
- Post town: Witney
- Postcode district: OX29
- Dialling code: 01865
- Police: Thames Valley
- Fire: Oxfordshire
- Ambulance: South Central
- UK Parliament: Bicester and Woodstock
- Website: Cassington Parish Council

Cassington is a village and civil parish in Oxfordshire about 5 miles (8 km) northwest of Oxford. The village lies on gravel strata about 1/2 mile (800 m) from the confluence of the River Evenlode with the River Thames. The parish includes the hamlet of Worton northeast of the village and the site of the former hamlet of Somerford to the south. Somerford seems to have been abandoned early in the 14th century. Cassington is formed of two parts, "upper" and "lower", each with its own village green. The 2011 Census recorded the parish's population as 750.

== Archaeology ==
Evidence has been found of Neolithic occupation. Traces have been found of a Saxon settlement with buildings, a village boundary and a field system.

== Toponym ==
Cassington's toponym is derived from the Old English Caersentun meaning "tun where cress grows". The Domesday Book of 1086 records the village as Cersetone in the Oxfordshire hundred of Wootton.

== Manors ==
In 1086 William the Conqueror's half-brother Odo, Bishop of Bayeux was the feudal overlord of Cassington. Cassington was divided into different manors. Odo granted the mesne lordship of the largest manor to Ilbert de Lacy and two smaller manors to Wadard, a knight in William's court. Ilbert de Lacy's manor at Cassington became part of the honour of Pontefract and passed to de Lacy's descendants, the Earls of Lincoln. When Henry de Lacy, 3rd Earl of Lincoln died in 1311 the Pontefract manor at Cassington passed to his son-in-law Thomas, 2nd Earl of Lancaster. Henry of Grosmont, 1st Duke of Lancaster had no sons, so when he died in 1361 the Pontefract manor at Cassington passed to one of his daughters, Blanche of Lancaster, wife of John of Gaunt, 1st Duke of Lancaster. There is no surviving record of the lordship of this manor thereafter.

By 1123 the mesne lord of one of Wadard's manors was King Henry I's chamberlain Geoffrey de Clinton. The mesne lordship was passed down to Geoffrey's descendants until 1242 when it was sold to the de Cauntelo family, who held it until 1356. No record of it survives thereafter. In 1317 William Montagu, 2nd Baron Montagu, then tenant of this manor, was licensed to crenellate his manor house. The house also had a moat and three fishponds. A mound southeast of the parish church marks the site of the house, and there are remains of the earthworks for the fishponds in a field to the south.

By 1235 Wadard's other manor at Cassington was part of the honour of Saint Valery, which by 1300 belonged to Edmund, 2nd Earl of Cornwall. However, by 1414 it was part of the Honour of Wallingford. By the end of the 12th century the mesne lordship of the manor had been divided and after 1247 the mesne lord of one part granted it to Godstow Abbey. The lordship of the other part changed hands down the centuries. In 1661 it was bought by Henry Allnut, and in 1711 his son (also Henry) sold it to John Churchill, 1st Duke of Marlborough. In the 13th century Godstow Abbey acquired part of the Pontefract manor at Cassington as well as part of the St Valery manor. The abbey combined them in a single manor which it retained until the dissolution of the monasteries in 1536. The manor house was on the south side of the village, apparently where Thames Mead Farm now stands. The current farmhouse on the site bears a date stone of 1607.

== Church and chapel ==
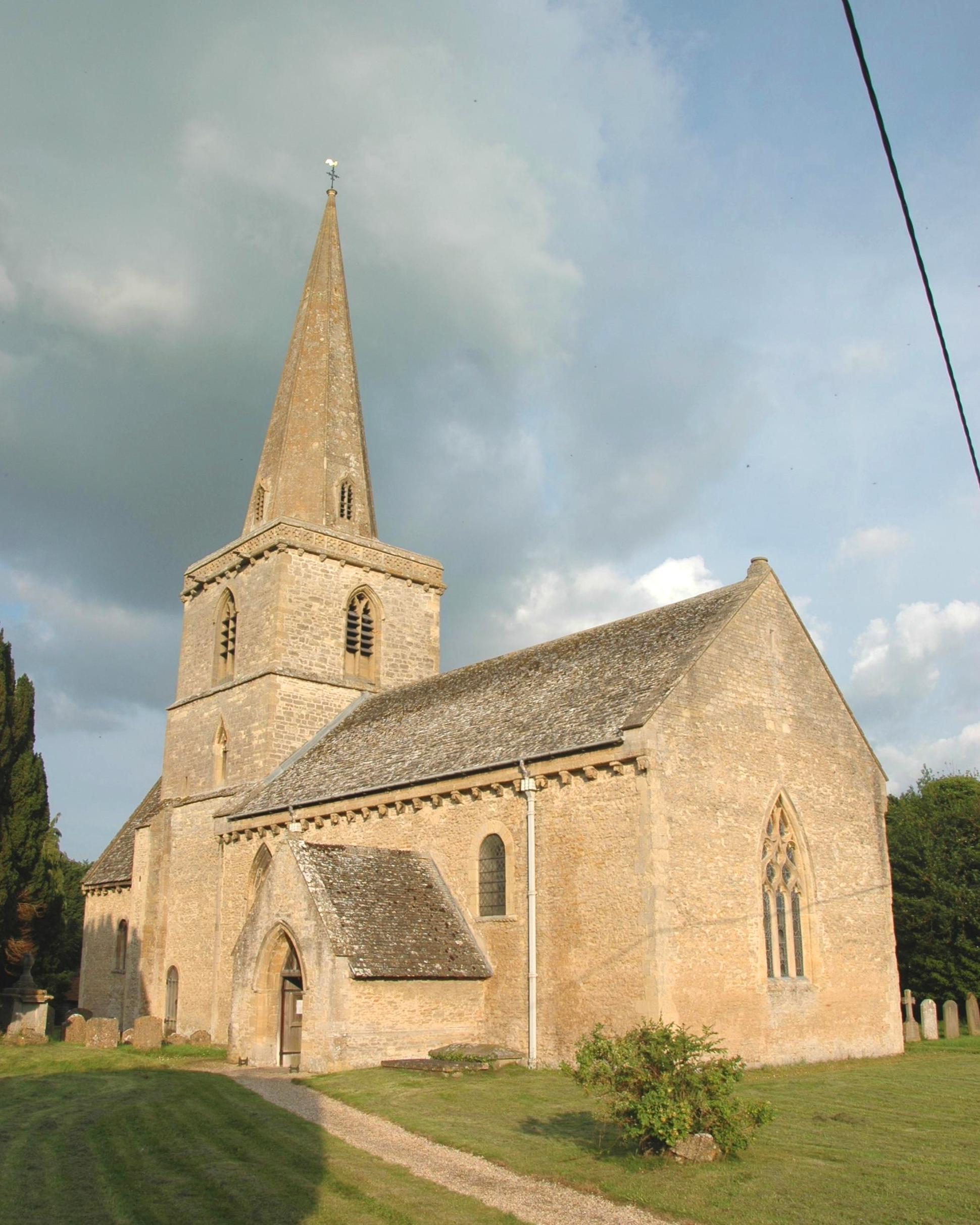
St Peter's parish church from the northwest

Geoffrey de Clinton built the Church of England parish church of Saint Peter in the Norman style before 1123. In 1318 Lady Montacute, who was a major benefactor of the Priory of St Frideswide, Oxford, made Decorated Gothic additions to St Peter's: the west window of the nave, east window of the chancel, the broach spire and the upper part of the tower on which it rests. Fragments of Medieval wall painting from this period survive in the church, including a Doom over the Norman chancel arch.

St Peter's church tower has a ring of six bells. James Keene of Bedford, whose bell-foundries included one at Woodstock, cast the third bell in 1640 and the fourth bell in 1652. His son Richard Keene cast the treble and fifth bells in 1665 and the tenor bell in 1666. Mears and Stainbank of the Whitechapel Bell Foundry cast the second bell in 1953, the year of Elizabeth II's coronation. St Peter's is now part of the Benefice of Eynsham and Cassington. After 1827 a Methodist congregation developed in Cassington, with itinerant preachers holding meetings in villagers' cottages. In 1870 the congregation built its own Primitive Methodist chapel. The chapel had closed by 1982 and is now commercial premises.

== Economic and social history ==
The parish's common lands were inclosed in 1801. In the 18th century the village had at least four public houses: the Bell, Chequers, Mason's Arms and Red Lion. Worton also had a public house, the Crown. The Mason's Arms closed in 1775 and the Crown closed in 1796. The Bell was in Lower Cassington and was built in 1688. It closed in 1976 and the building in Bell Lane is now a private house.

In 1724 Henry Allnut, a lawyer of the Middle Temple in London who had owned one of the manors at Cassington and had an estate at Goring Heath in South Oxfordshire, left a continuing income from his estate to teach, clothe and apprentice boys from five parishes including Cassington. Allnut also founded a set of almshouses at Goring Heath. Allnut's charity maintained a small school for boys at Cassington throughout the 18th century. By 1831 the Vicar of St Peter's had established a day school that incorporated Allnut's charity, and in 1853 the building of a new schoolhouse beside upper Cassington green was funded jointly by the parish, Christ Church and the Allnut charity. The new school was a National School by 1866 and was enlarged in 1876. In 1926 it was reorganised as a junior school, with older children going to Gosford Hill School. In 1973 the school moved to new buildings adjacent to the old one, which became a private house. It is now St Peter's Church of England primary school and occupies an adjacent modern school building

Between 1800 and 1802 the 4th Duke of Marlborough, who was a shareholder in the Oxford Canal, built the Cassington Cut, a "broad" canal about 1,300 yards (1,200 m) long linking the Thames with a wharf about 1,000 yards (910 m) southwest of the village. The wharf had its own public house, The Barge, which was open between 1804 and 1872. In 1861 the Witney Railway was built past Cassington, linking Witney with the Oxford, Worcester and Wolverhampton Railway at nearby Yarnton. This may have contributed to the decline of the Cut, which seems to have become disused by about 1870. The Barge public house closed at the same time or shortly afterwards. In 1935 the stretch of the A40 road between Wolvercote and Eynsham was built through the parish past Cassington village. In 1936 the Great Western Railway opened Cassington Halt just southeast of the village. It served the village until British Railways withdrew passenger trains from the Witney Railway in 1962.

== Reopening the railway ==
In February 2015, the Witney Oxford Transport Group proposed the reopening of the station as an alternative to improvements to the A40 road proposed by Oxfordshire County Council. There is a strong case to reopen the railway given the severe traffic congestion on the roads to and from Oxford.

== Amenities ==
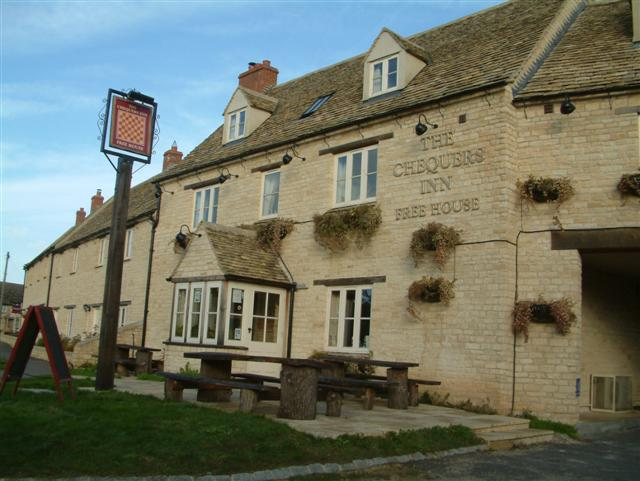
The Chequers Inn

Cassington's two remaining public houses are the Chequers and the Red Lion, on opposite sides of Upper Cassington green. In the early 2000s the Chequers was demolished and rebuilt by a redevelopment team led by Stephen Ibbitson, alongside a row of new houses and a village hall. It is owned independently, previously controlled by the Young's pub company. The Red Lion remains in its original building, complete with a stone-lined well visible inside the building. There is a small newsagent in the village but there are no other shops - the part-time Post Office has also closed.

Cassington Football Club played in the Witney and District Football Association Premier League but the club was dissolved in 2009. The Elms Road sports field is still used for football and cricket. Oxford Rescue and Cassington Cricket Club belonged to the Oxfordshire Cricket Association, but in May 2014 due to a shortage of players the club withdrew from the OCA and dissolved itself. Cassington has a Women's Institute.

== Cassington Bike Night ==
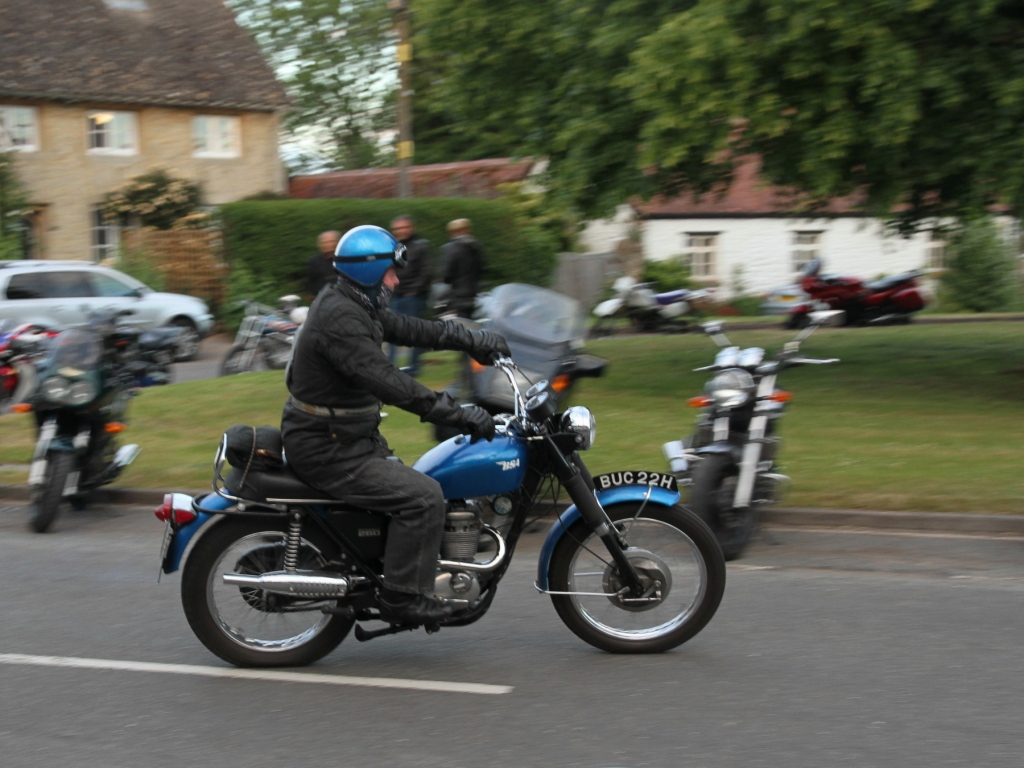
A 1969 or 1970 BSA B25 Woodsman motorcycle leaving the Red Lion in 2015

The British Motorcycle Riders' Club (Oxford) meets at the Red Lion. On the last Monday of June the village holds its annual Bike Night on Upper Cassington village green. Several thousand motorcyclists fill the village to see a static display of hundreds of historic British motorcycles. St Peter's School, the Women's institute, the village's pre-school playgroup and a Scout troop from nearby Eynsham all raise funds from the event.

== Sources and further reading ==
- Compton, Hugh J (1976). The Oxford Canal. Newton Abbot: David & Charles. pp. 60–61. ISBN 0-7153-7238-6.
- Crossley, Alan; Elrington, C.R. (eds.); Baggs, A.P.; Blair, W.J.; Chance, Eleanor; Colvin, Christina; Cooper, Janet; Day, C.J.; Selwyn, Nesta; Townley, Simon C. (1990). A History of the County of Oxford. Victoria County History. Vol. 12: Wootton Hundred (South) including Woodstock. London: Oxford University Press for the Institute of Historical Research. pp. 36–54. ISBN 978-0-19722-774-9.
- Dawson, GJ (1961–62). "Excavations at Purwell Farm, Cassington, Oxon". Oxoniensia. XXXVI–XXXVII. Oxford Architectural and Historical Society: 1–7.
- Leeds, ET (1940). "New Discoveries of Neolithic Pottery in Oxfordshire". Oxoniensia. V. Oxford Architectural and Historical Society: 1–15.
- Leeds, ET; Riley, M. (1942). "Two Early Saxon Cemeteries at Cassington, Oxon". Oxoniensia. VII. Oxford Architectural and Historical Society: 61–70.
- Rowley, Trevor (1978). Villages in the Landscape. Archaeology in the Field Series. London: J.M. Dent & Sons Ltd. p. 97. ISBN 0-460-04166-5.
- Sherwood, Jennifer; Pevsner, Nikolaus (1974). Oxfordshire. The Buildings of England. Harmondsworth: Penguin Books. pp. 522–523. ISBN 0-14-071045-0.
