= A34 Road Bridge =

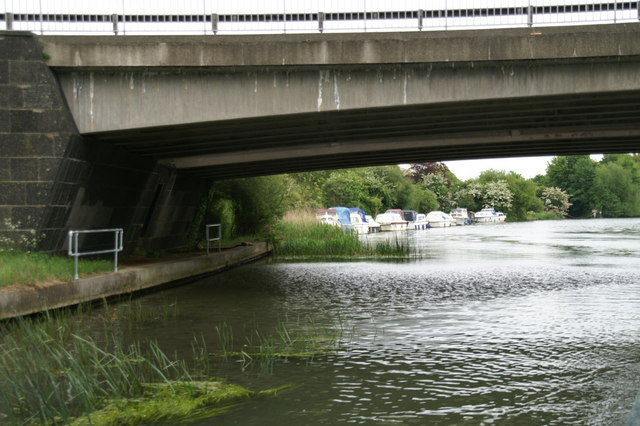
- Coordinates: 51.780854°N 1.303185°W
- Carries: A34 road
- Crosses: River Thames
- Locale: Oxford
- Maintained by: National Highways

Characteristics
- Height: 13 feet 6 inches (4.11 m)

History
- Opened: 1961

Location
- Interactive map of A34 Road Bridge

The A34 Road Bridge is a modern road bridge carrying the Oxford ring road (A34 road) at Oxford, England, across the River Thames. It crosses the Thames just upstream of Godstow Lock near Wolvercote on the reach to King's Lock. The bridge was built in 1961.

The bridge's formal name on the Ordnance Survey map is Thames Bridge, possibly to distinguish it from the Isis Bridge, the only other bridge carrying the Oxford ring road over the Thames.

An embankment either side of the bridge carries the A34 over the Thames floodplain. To the south the embankment links the bridge to a bridge carrying the A34 over the local road between Wytham and Wolvercote. To the north the bridge is linked by the embankment to the Wolvercote Viaduct that carries the A34 across the Cherwell Valley Line railway, the Oxford Canal and the A40 road. Between 2008 and 2010 there was a major project to replace the viaduct with a new bridge. The bridge over the Thames was not replaced.

== See also ==
- Crossings of the River Thames

Next crossing upstream	River Thames	Next crossing downstream
Swinford Toll Bridge (toll road)	A34 Road Bridge	Godstow Bridge (road)
