= St Peter's Church, Wolvercote =

St Peter’s Church, Wolvercote
- Church of St Peter
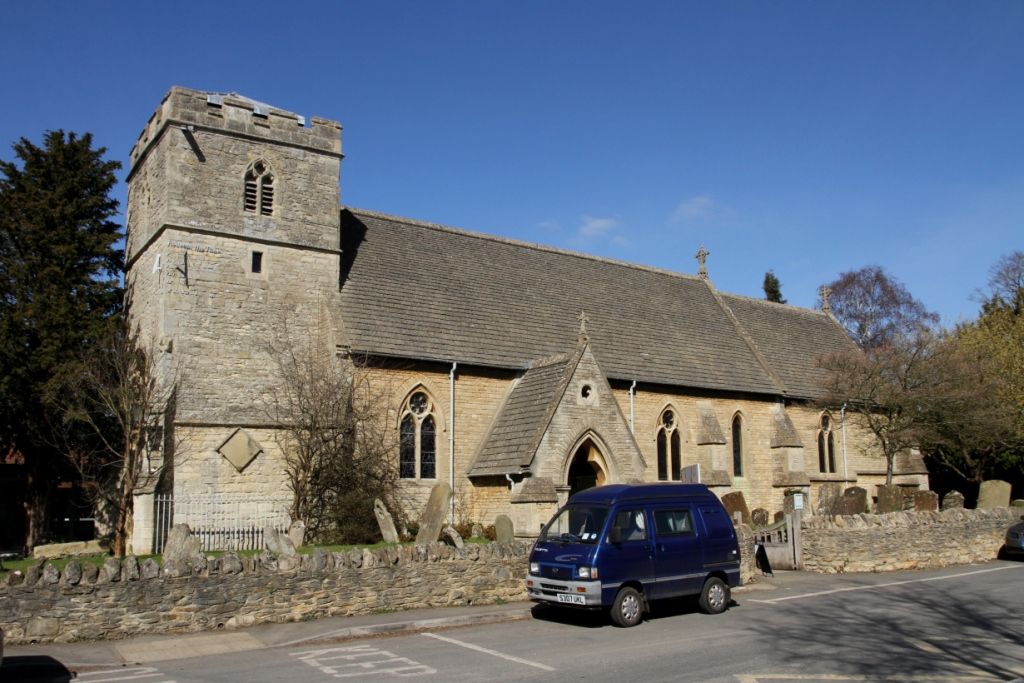
- St Peter’s Church, Wolvercote
- 51.784952°N 1.281193°W
- OS grid reference: SP 49683 09835
- Location: Wolvercote, Oxfordshire
- Country: England
- Denomination: Church of England

History
- Status: Parish church

Architecture
- Functional status: Active
- Heritage designation: Grade II listed building
- Designated: 18 July 1963
- Architect: Charles Buckeridge (1860 rebuild)
- Style: Decorated Gothic Revival (Victorian rebuild); Perpendicular (tower)
- Completed: 1860 (rebuild)

Administration
- Diocese: Oxford
- Archdeaconry: Oxford
- Deanery: Oxford
- Parish: Wolvercote

St Peter’s Church, Wolvercote is the Church of England parish church serving Wolvercote, Oxfordshire, within the Diocese of Oxford. It is designated as a Grade II listed building.

== History ==
A chapel of ease at Wolvercote, dependent on the church of St Peter-in-the-East in Oxford, is first recorded in 1236, although architectural evidence - notably the surviving Norman tub font - suggests that a church existed on the site by the late 12th century.

In 1482 the chancel was rebuilt under the patronage of Merton College; it is possible a new nave was constructed at the same time, but only the tower survives from that period.

The medieval church, with the exception of the west tower, was demolished in 1859. In 1860 a new nave, chancel, north aisle (with mortuary chapel), and south porch were constructed in the Decorated Gothic Revival style by Charles Buckeridge, built on the medieval foundations.

== Architecture and fittings ==
The west tower survives from the medieval church. It is of two stages, with an embattled parapet, and is believed to date from the 14th century.

Positioned below the tower, is an early baptismal tub font with simple geometric decoration. Although sometimes described as Saxon, it is more likely Norman in date.

A mortuary chapel in the north east corner of the nave houses the elaborate tomb of Sir John Walter of Godstow (d. c. 1630), with recumbent effigies of Walter and his two wives, and figures of three sons and three daughters kneeling at their heads and feet. The monument’s canopy was destroyed during the Civil War, and it was re-erected in its current form during the 1860 rebuild, utilising a reused 13th century arch to mimic the lost canopy.

The tower includes two sundials with the motto Redeem the Time. Although the dial faces and motto are modern replacements (1995), they echo earlier dials on the tower.

The East window in the chancel dates to 1882 and consists of five lights that together portray the great events of Christianity. In the north light is the Nativity; the three centre lights depict the Crucifixion; in the south light is the Resurrection. At the apex of the window is the Ascended Christ throned in Glory.

In the south aisle is a two-light “Palm Sunday” window designed by John Piper and made by Patrick Reyntiens. It depicts a multitude of children's hands holding the palms that greeted Jesus on his entry into Jerusalem, all depicted in vivid blue, gold and green tones. It was installed in 1976 following a bequest made by Alderman Bellamy and his wife who left £1,000 for a memorial window relating to the Biblical text "suffer the little children to come unto me" (Mark 10:14).

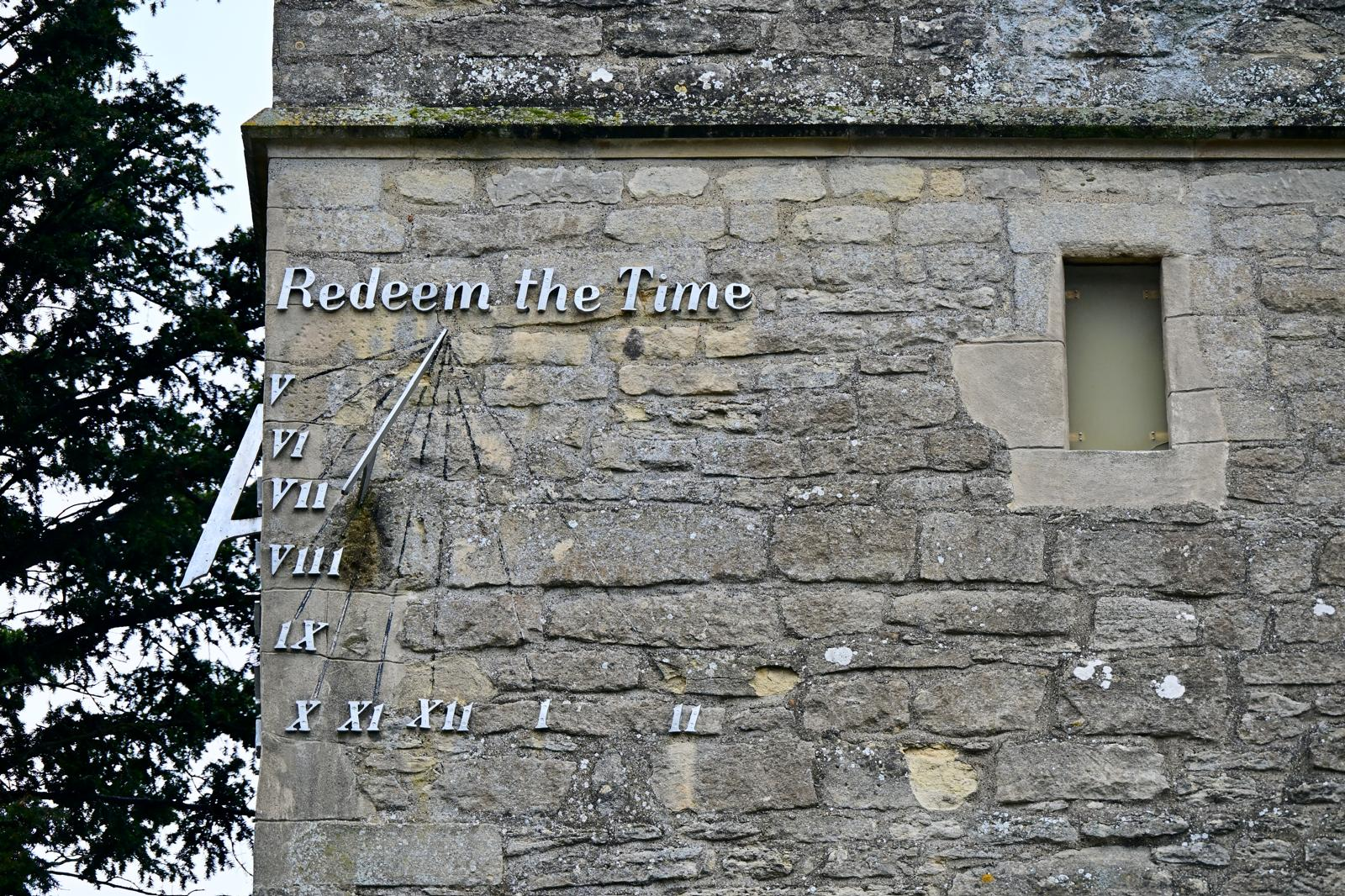
Tower sundial

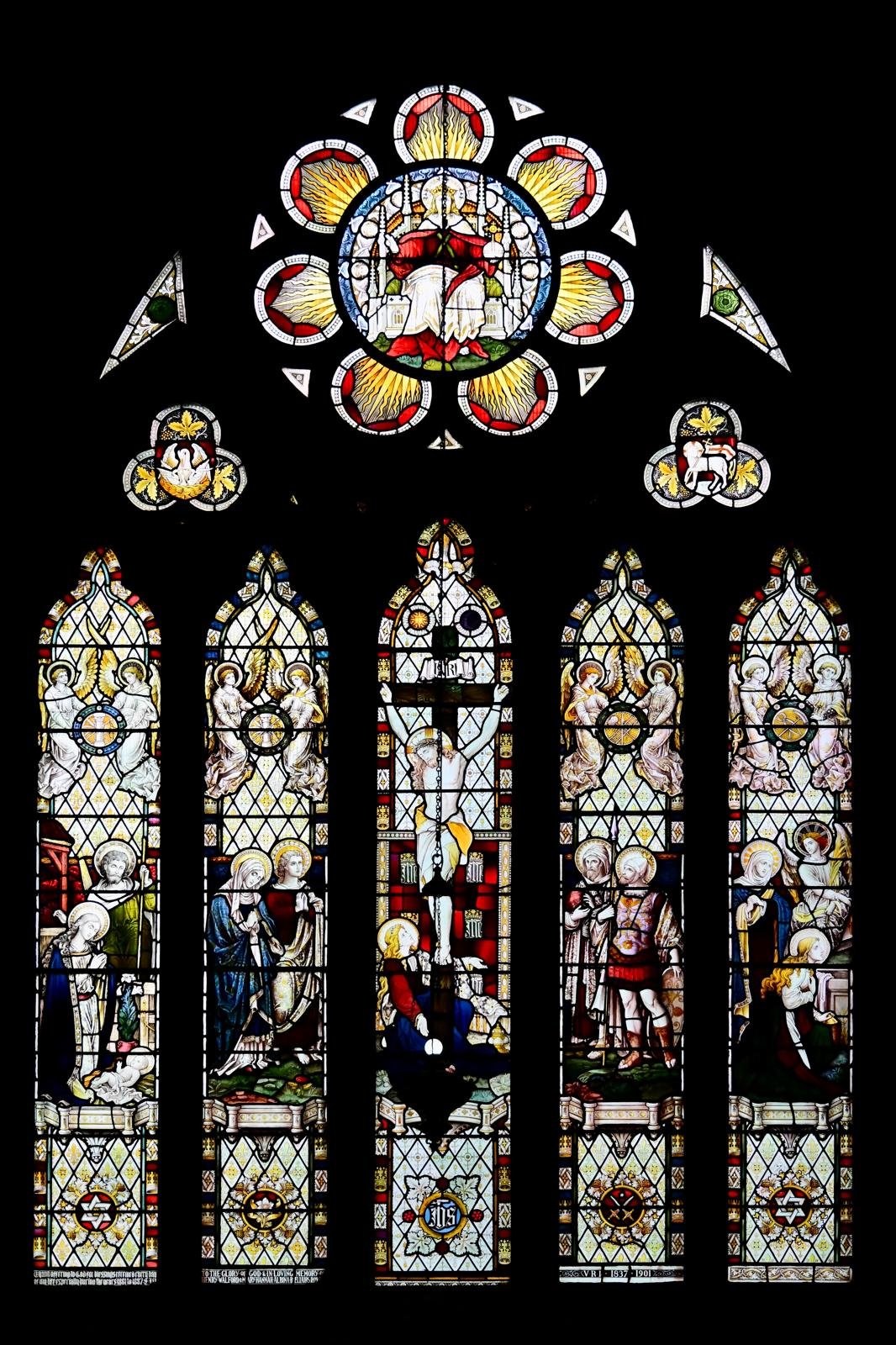
East chancel window

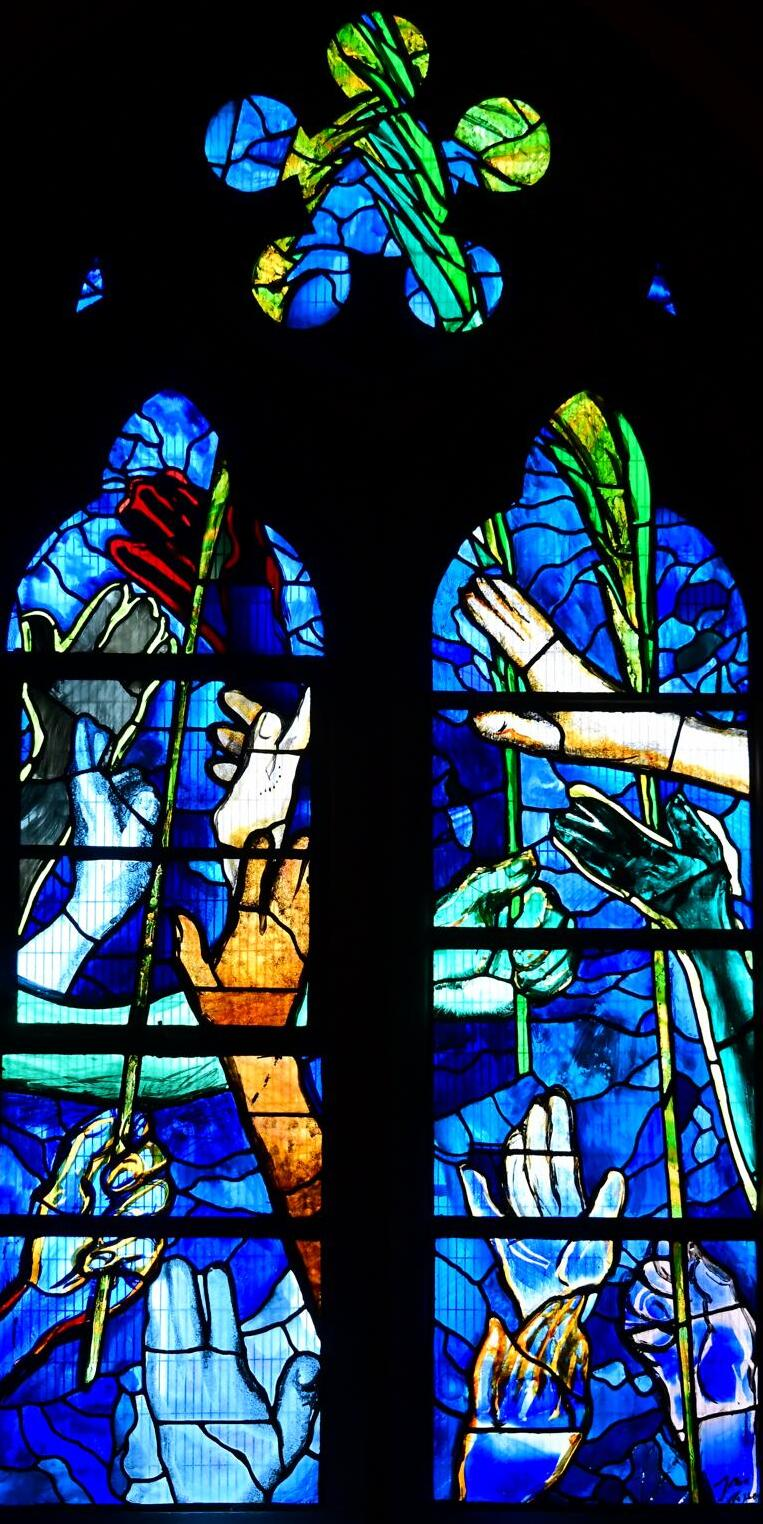
South aisle window by John Piper

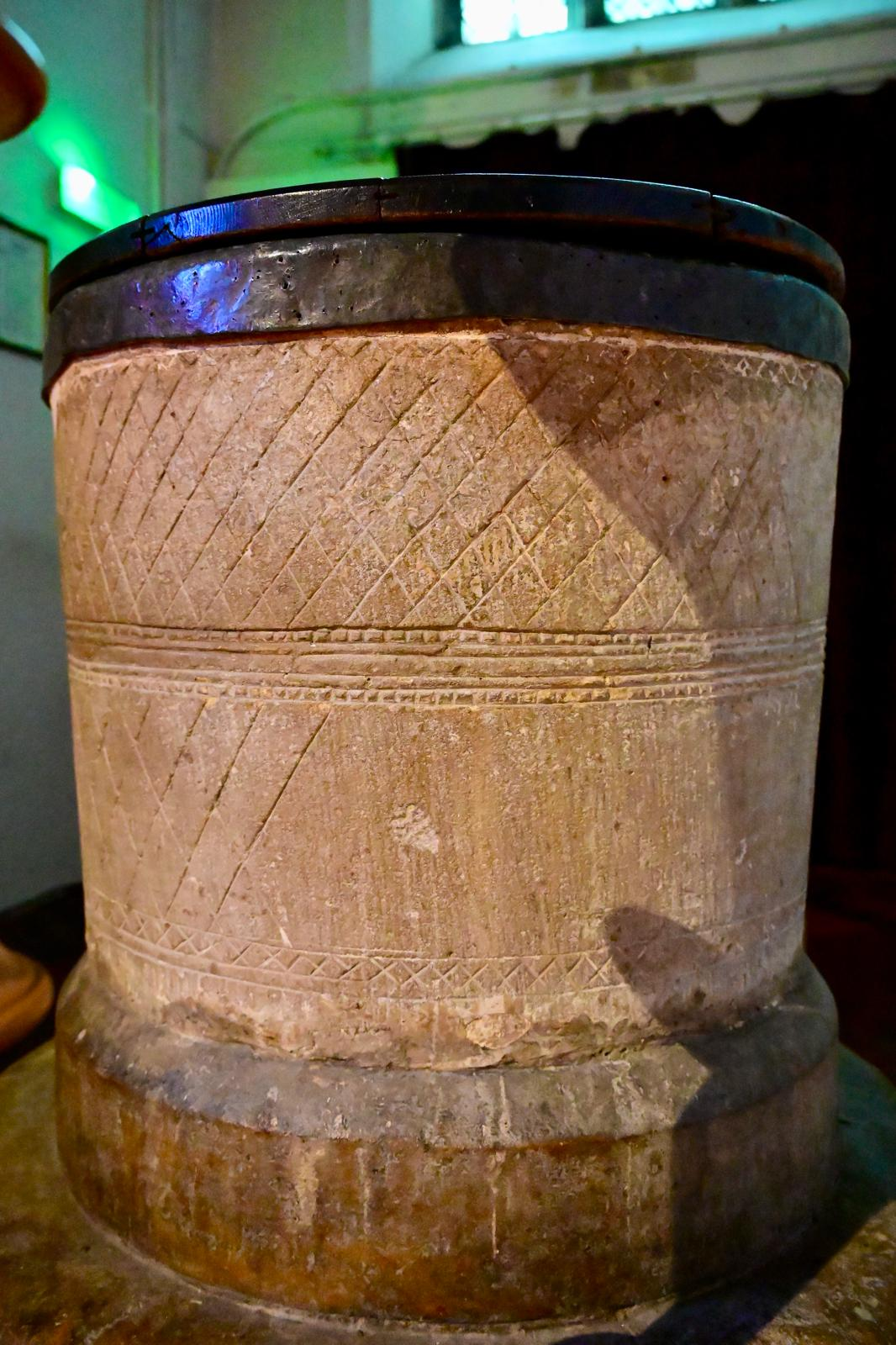
Norman tub font

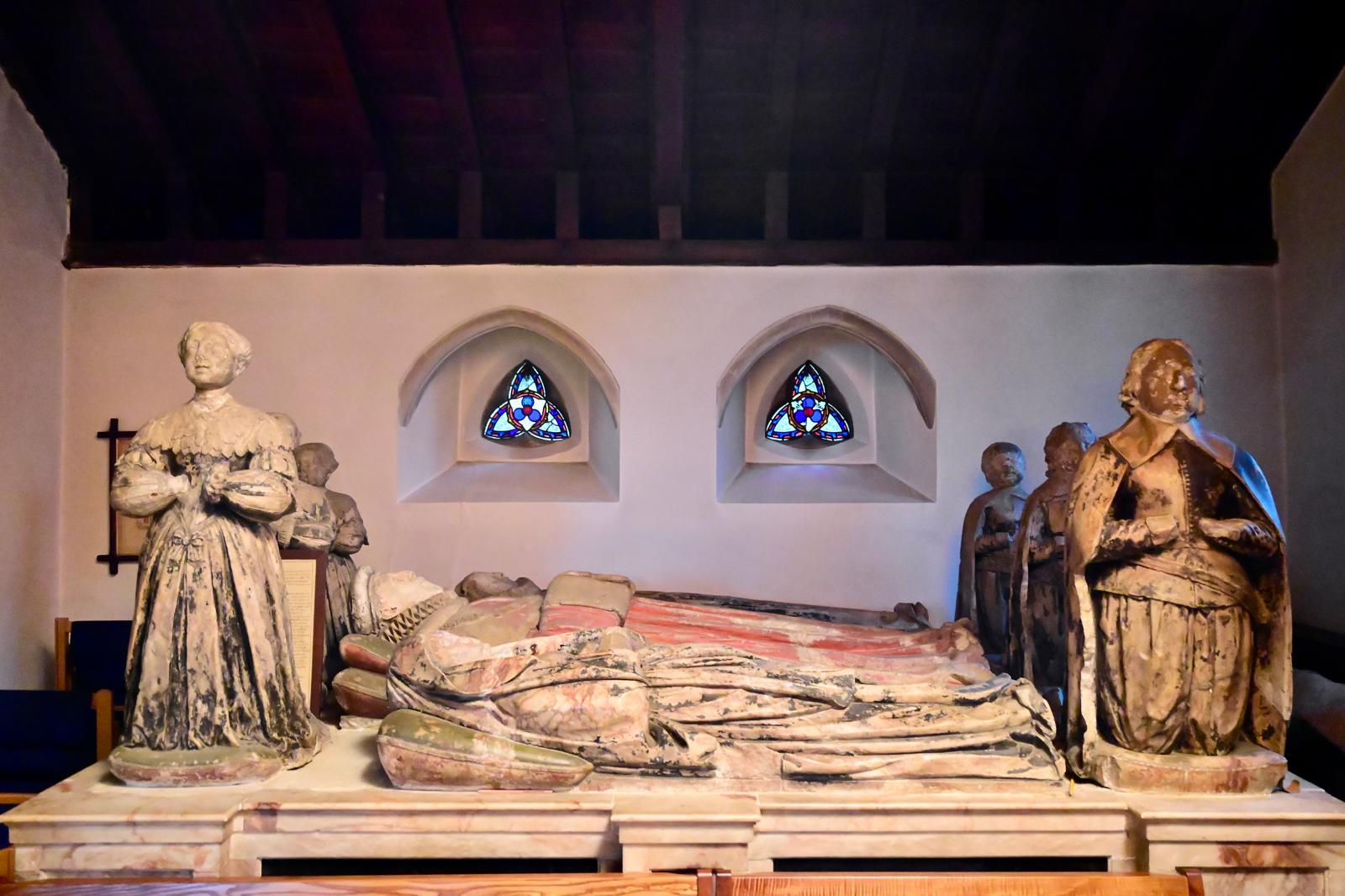
Walter monument
