= Godstow Lock =

Lock on the River Thames in Oxfordshire, England

Coordinates: 51.77667°N 1.29843°W

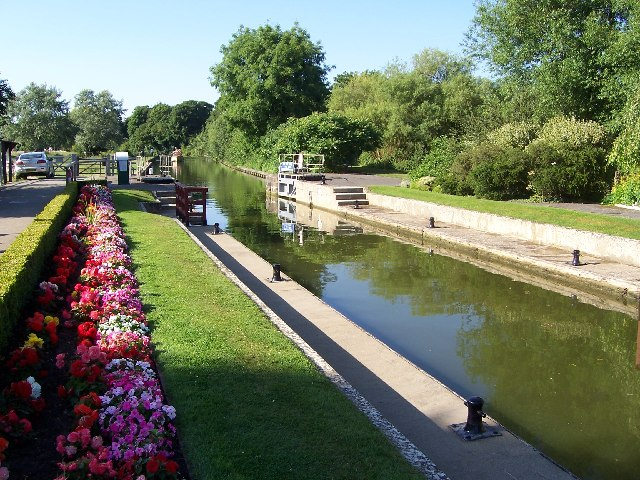
- Interactive map of Godstow Lock
- Waterway: River Thames
- County: Oxfordshire
- Maintained by: Environment Agency
- Operation: hydraulic
- First built: 1790
- Latest built: 1924
- Length: 33.52 m (110 ft 0 in)
- Width: 4.95 m (16 ft 3 in)
- Fall: 1.57 m (5 ft 2 in)
- Above sea level: 190'
- Distance to Teddington Lock: 96 miles

Godstow Lock is a lock on the River Thames in Oxfordshire, England. It is between the villages of Wolvercote and Wytham on the outskirts of Oxford. The first lock was built of stone by Daniel Harris for the Thames Navigation Commission in 1790. It is the lock furthest upstream on the river which has mechanical (electro-hydraulic) operation – every lock upstream of Godstow utilises manual beam operation instead.

The main weir is a short way upstream but there is another weir at Godstow Bridge just above The Trout Inn. These feed into a backwater (Wolvercote Mill Stream) which has come from above King's Lock by Wolvercote.

== History ==
Prior to the construction of the lock, Godstow Bridge served as a form of lock, which remained in service for some time after the construction of Godstow Lock in 1790. After the lock was constructed there were complaints about the raising of the water levels and the effect this had on the meadows upstream at Pixey Mead. After some years of dilapidation, the lock underwent major repair in 1872. River users would often avoid the lock by navigating up the stream past Wolvercote. The lock house was built around 1896 on condition that it sold no refreshments to protect the interests of The Trout Inn. Previously the lock-keeper had lived on a houseboat. The lock was last rebuilt in 1924.

== Access to the lock ==
The lock is a short way from Godstow Bridge and can be reached on foot from there.

== Reach above the lock ==
Beside the lock at Godstow are the ruins of Godstow Nunnery. Above the lock, the river is crossed by Godstow Bridge and the A34 Road Bridge carrying the Oxford By-pass. Upstream of Godstow the river becomes narrower and more winding as it passes Pixey Mead.

The Thames Path continues on the western side to King's Lock.

== Literature and the media ==
In the meadows near the lock, an Oxford mathematics tutor Charles Lutwidge Dodgson used to have picnics with his friend Dean Henry Liddell and his daughters Lorina, Alice and Edith. Here he made up a story which began

"Alice was beginning to get very tired of sitting by her sister on the bank and having nothing to do..... when suddenly a White Rabbit with pink eyes ran close by her..."

== See also ==
- Locks on the River Thames

== Sources ==
- Davies, Mark; Robinson, Catherine (2003) [2001]. A Towpath Walk in Oxford. Oxford: Oxford Towpath Press. ISBN 0-9535593-1-9.
- Thacker, Fred. S. (1968) [1920]. The Thames Highway: Volume II Locks and Weirs. Newton Abbot: David and Charles.

Next lock upstream	River Thames	Next lock downstream
King's Lock; 1.81 km (1.12 mi)	Godstow Lock; Grid reference: SP485089	Osney Lock; 3.87 km (2.40 mi)
