= King's Lock =

Lock on the River Thames in Oxfordshire, England

Coordinates: 51.78905°N 1.3069°W

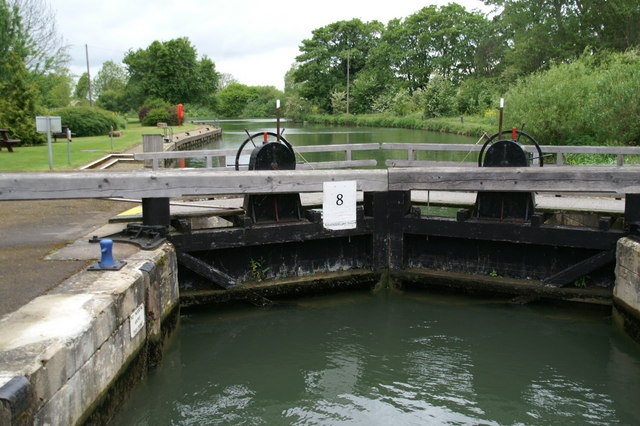
- Waterway: River Thames
- County: Oxfordshire
- Maintained by: Environment Agency
- Operation: Manual
- First built: 1928
- Length: 34.46 m (113 ft 1 in)
- Width: 4.97 m (16 ft 4 in)
- Fall: 0.77 m (2 ft 6 in)
- Above sea level: 192 feet
- Distance to Teddington Lock: 97 miles

King's Lock is a lock on the River Thames in England. It is in open country about 1 km north of Godstow, to the north of Oxford, Oxfordshire, at grid reference SP478102, on the southern bank of the river. The lock was one of the last pound locks built on the Thames, built by the Thames Conservancy in 1928 to replace the former flash lock. It has the smallest fall of any lock on the river, 0.77 m (2 ft 6 in).

The lock is on the southern side of a large island. On the opposite side of the river is the start of the Wolvercote Mill Stream leading to Duke's Cut, which connects the Thames to the Oxford Canal. The Mill Stream rejoins the Thames below Godstow Lock. King's Weir is on the other side of the island below Duke's Cut. There is a small visitor information centre at the lock.

== History ==
There was a weir recorded at King's as far back as the 16th century. A pound lock was first proposed in 1817, but never built. A further proposal was made in 1845. The weir had a history of complaints about the water level and lack of attendance for the flash lock. Around 1872 a boatslide was built for the portage of small boats. The weir was rebuilt in 1885 but its replacement by a pound lock did not happen until 1928.

== Access to the lock ==
The lock can be reached down a long track along the right bank of the river from the Godstow road just where it passes under the A34 Oxford by-pass. There is a public footpath across the lock and weir.

== Reach above the lock ==
Just upstream of the lock, the Thames reaches its northernmost point. About 1 km or half a mile upstream, on the southern bank, the Seacourt Stream separates off; this rejoins the Thames just south of the city centre, at Kennington Railway Bridge.

Looking further upstream, the Thames runs through open country. About 2 km upstream, the River Evenlode joins from the northern side. Another 1 km upstream is the Cassington Cut, now a branch of the Evenlode. A further 1 km upstream, Wharf Stream also joins on the same side just before Eynsham Lock.

The Thames Path follows the southern bank to Eynsham Lock.

== See also ==
- Locks on the River Thames

Next lock upstream	River Thames	Next lock downstream
Eynsham Lock; 4.37 km (2.72 mi)	King's Lock; Grid reference: SP478102	Godstow Lock; 1.81 km (1.12 mi)
