= Duke's Cut =

Waterway in Oxfordshire, England

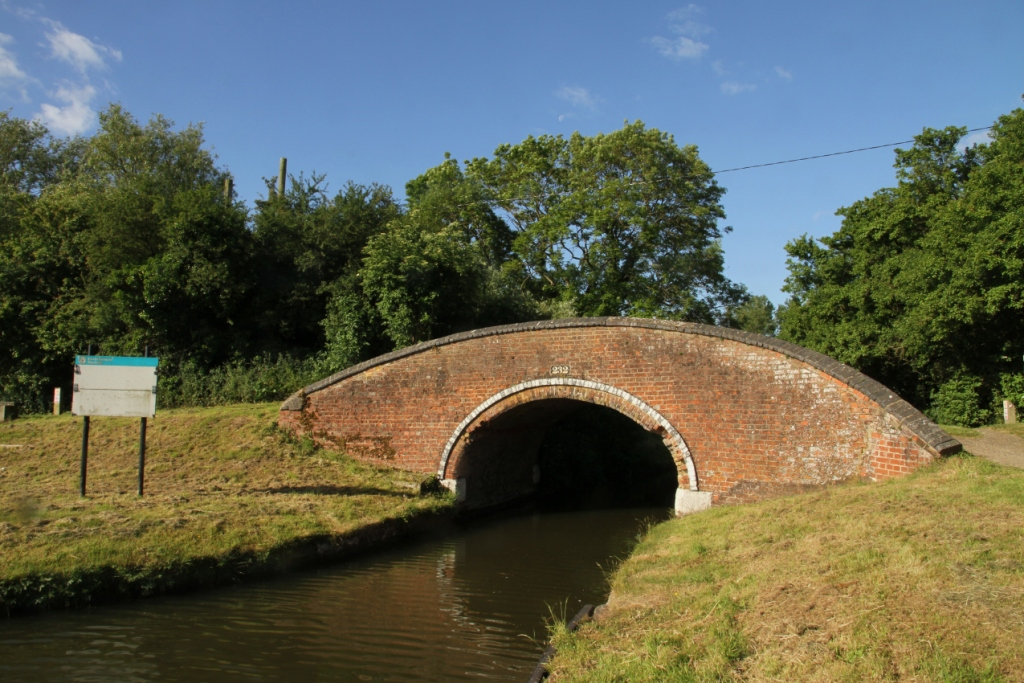
- Bridge 232, crossing the Duke's Cut
- Interactive map of Duke's Cut
- Location: Wolvercote
- Country: United Kingdom
- Coordinates: 51.79136°N 1.29675°W

Specifications
- Length: 0.25 miles (0.40 km)
- Minimum boat draft: 4 feet 11 inches (1.50 m)
- Locks: 1
- Status: Open
- Navigation authority: Canal and River Trust

History
- Original owner: Duke of Marlborough
- Date completed: 1789

Geography
- Direction: WSW
- Start point: Wolvercote Junction, Oxford Canal
- End point: Duke's Cut Junction, Wolvercote Mill Stream
- Beginning coordinates: 51.7924°N 1.2937°W
- Ending coordinates: 51.7908°N 1.2991°W
- Branch of: Oxford Canal
- Connects to: Oxford Canal, Wolvercote Mill Stream

Duke's Cut is a short waterway in Oxfordshire, England, which connects the Oxford Canal with the River Thames via the Wolvercote Mill Stream. It is named after George Spencer, 4th Duke of Marlborough, across whose land the waterway was cut. It is seen as a branch of the Oxford Canal.

== History ==
The Cut was constructed at the request of the Duke of Marlborough. The Duchy of Marlborough had owned Wolvercote paper mill since 1720, and much of the surrounding land belonged to their Blenheim Palace estate. In the 1790s, the Duke saw the benefit of bringing Warwickshire coal to the area, as the upper Thames area typically only received fuel from the Northumberland Coalfield via London, and consequently little cargo was left by the time vessels reached the upper river. As owner of the land between the Oxford Canal and the mill stream, the Duke was aware of how level it was (and thus suited to a waterway) and permitted construction of a 500-yard (460 m) cut between the two waterways. The millstream provided a connection to the Thames above King's Weir, bypassing the flash lock.

The cut opened in 1789; the exact date is unknown but an advertisement carried in William Jackson's Oxford Journal—published by the tenant of Wolvercote Mill and printed on the mill's paper—showed that the cut had opened by 3 October. It was conveyed in trust to the Vice-Chancellor of the University of Oxford and the Mayor of Oxford in 1792.

Adjacent to the cut is Duke's Lake, a reservoir also used for carp, roach, tench, and bream angling.

Today, the cut is the preferred boating route from the Oxford Canal to the Thames; the alternative route is at Oxford via and Isis Lock and the Sheepwash Channel. Until 1937, the latter was the only route between King's Lock and the lower Thames without having to navigate the flash lock at Medley Weir near Godstow Lock.

== Description ==
In 1802, Robert Mylne surveyed the cut and reported his findings to the Thames Commissioners. He described how the cut had a stop lock near Wolvercote Junction where it meets the canal; the beam of this was given as 13 feet 2 inches (4.01 m). Bradshaw's Canals and Navigable Waterways of England and Wales (1904) noted that the lock gates were reversible to be usable regardless of which waterway was higher. The canal usually discharged towards the Thames, with an average pen of 1 foot (0.30 m), although when in flood, the Thames could rise to be up to 2 feet (0.61 m) above the canal. The lock, known as Duke's Cut Lock, is designated 44A; the numbering is inherited from that on the Oxford Canal. The lock is crossed by the Birmingham and Oxford Junction Railway, which opened in 1850. In 1987, the lock was granted Grade II listed status.

At the junction with the mill stream, fed from the Thames, was a single gate of 12 feet 6 inches (3.81 m). Mylne stated that this floodgate was of poor seal and water easily flowed into the canal at times the river was of a higher level.

In 1933, the Oxford–Witney road was constructed, and a large single-span skew arch bridge (designated 232U) was built across the cut. The cut had a towing path along its north bank, which ran to the Thames in the west and connected with that of the Oxford Canal. The towing path on the Oxford Canal crosses the cut by means of a brick arch bridge which also has Grade II listed status.

At Duke's Cut Junction, a three-way Inland Waterways Association fingerpost sign provides navigational guidance, and shows that the Wolvercote Mill Stream below the junction was only for access to the mill.

Next confluence upstream	River Thames	Next confluence downstream
River Evenlode (north)	Duke's Cut	Bulstake Stream (south)
