= Cassington Canal =

Canal in Oxfordshire

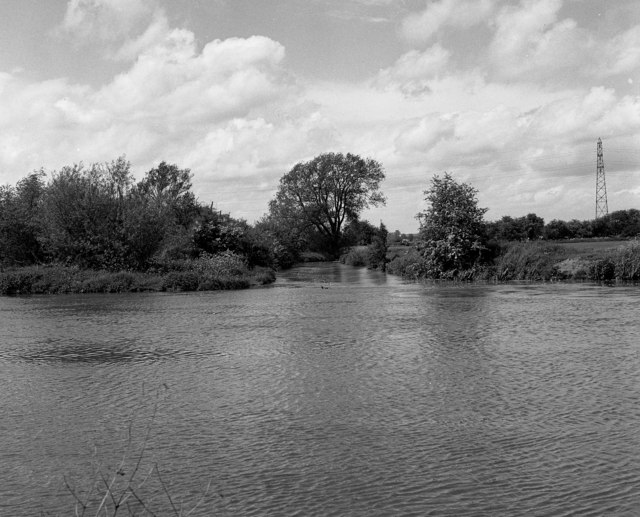
- Junction of the Cassington Canal and River Thames
- Location: Eynsham, Oxfordshire
- Coordinates: 51°47′02″N 1°20′54″W

Specifications
- Length: 0.75 miles (1.21 km)
- Maximum boat length: 112 ft 0 in (34.14 m)
- Maximum boat beam: 14 ft 10 in (4.52 m)
- Locks: 1
- Status: Derelict

History
- Construction began: 1800 (Note: Other sources suggest the canal was cut before the turn of the century)
- Date extended: 1802
- Date closed: c. 1870

Geography
- Start point: River Thames
- End point: Cassington Wharf

The Cassington Canal (also known as the Cassington Cut or the Evenlode Cut) was an early 19th-century canal near Eynsham, Oxfordshire. The canal was built by the 4th Duke of Marlborough to provide a link between the River Thames and Cassington Mill; it later provided alternative wharfage to that at Eynsham. The 3/4-mile (1.2 km) canal was in operation for less than 70 years, its use declining with the advent of rail transport.

The canal's primary use was to connect the Duke's salt works with the network of canals, rivers, and other inland waterways, as well as connecting the Oxford Canal and the Thames and Severn Canal.

== History ==
Built between 1800 and 1802, the canal initially provided an 11-chain (240 yd; 220 m) connection between Cassington Mill and the recently constructed Cassington–Eynsham road. An early mention of the canal was in 1800, where the canal was described as "made by and belonging to" the Duke of Marlborough, and that its purpose was to convey goods between Cassington Mill and a wharf. A wide pool exists on the canal near Cassington Mill; this was possibly a basin which acted as the original terminus. Here, sluices and a weir between the cut and the River Evenlode were built. By 1802, the canal was extended to meet the River Thames. At this time, engineer Robert Mylne conducted a report for the Thames Commissioners, which described the canal's length as approximately 3/4 mile (1.2 km), (Note: Mylne referred to the length as approximately "six furlongs") and its width as 30 feet (9.1 m). He also documented a lock at the canal's junction with the Thames—possibly a stop lock as the navigations were controlled by different bodies. The lock, which maintained the canal at 4 feet 11 inches (1.50 m) above the Thames (the same height as the mill weir) was 14 feet 10 inches (4.52 m) wide and 112 feet (34 m) long. Beyond the canal's navigational limit at Cassington Wharf, the channel continued as a feeder from the Evenlode.

The Duke of Marlborough was a shareholder in the Oxford Canal and had recently provided access between the lower Oxford Canal and the Thames via the Duke's Cut. As a private canal—both in terms of finance and land ownership—no act of Parliament was needed to allow its construction. It was built as a broad canal, meaning vessels wider than 7 feet (2.1 m)—the standard maximum beam of a narrowboat—were able to use it. Boats from the north were restricted by the lock sizes on the Oxford Canal, which only catered for narrow boats. The Duke leased the canal to the Oxford Canal Company. A public house, The Barge, was established at the wharf in 1804 by the first wharfinger, Henry Baker. Baker had previously been employed at Enslow on the Oxford Canal, and it is he after whom Baker's Lock (number 40) on the Oxford Canal was named. Baker constructed two lime kilns at the wharf. Although sources suggest that the canal was not complete until 1814, reports exist of through-traffic of coal barges from the wharf to the Thames that were in operation in 1808.

The canal's primary use was to provide a connection between the Duke's estate (including the trade from his salt works) and the network of inland waterways including other canals and rivers. The canal was able to trade with the Warwickshire Coalfield via the Thames and the Oxford Canal, and the Somerset Coalfield via the Thames and thence the Thames and Severn, Wilts and Berks, Kennet and Avon Canal, and Somerset Coal Canals. Fierce competition between the Thames and Severn Canal Company (who had taken over ownership of the cut) and the Oxford Canal Company (who owned the Wharf Stream in Eynsham) meant that barges were not permitted to unload at Eynsham Wharf. The Oxford Canal Company reacted by taking over the lease of the canal in 1834 to quash competition of coal travelling to the area from Somerset. At this time, Cassington Wharf was taking approximately £800 per year (equivalent to £97,121 in 2023).

In 1839, Cassington Wharf was considered as a loading point for Taynton stone if it was to be used in the rebuilding of the Houses of Parliament. Charles Barry instead opted for Anston stone, much of which was loaded at Kiveton Park Wharf onto the Chesterfield Canal and taken from there to London via the North Sea.

The Oxford Canal Company did not renew the lease on the canal after 1842, and it was taken over by John Hambridge. In the 1841 census, Hambridge was a 40-year-old coal merchant living at Cassington Wharf. He was still living at the wharf at the time of the following census in 1851.

In 1861, the Oxford, Witney and Fairford Railway opened and the railway crossed the canal by means of a single-span of 32 feet 10 inches (10.01 m). Embankments either side of the canal raised the railbed with a 1 in 100 (10 ‰) gradient to allow sufficient clearance below the bridge. The bridge was removed by the 1980s.

== Decline ==
Use of the cut declined in the mid-19th century following the arrival of the Witney railway. The canal was still in occasional use in 1865 but was likely to have gone out of use by 1870. The public house closed in 1872. The 1898 1:2,500 Ordnance Survey map marked the cut as "Old Canal". By 1913, there was no trace of the entrance lock and the cut was described as little more than a brook, and by 1926 the canal was described as "forgotten".

The weirs between the River Evenlode and the canal are now used by the Environment Agency as part of their Cassington Mill gauging station. Part of the canal is now used for angling, and is administered by the Abingdon and Oxford Anglers Alliance.
