= Worton (hamlet), Oxfordshire =

Hamlet in Cassington, Oxfordshire, England

Coordinates: 51.801°N 1.336°W

Worton
- Location within Oxfordshire
- OS grid reference: SP4611
- Civil parish: Cassington
- District: West Oxfordshire
- Shire county: Oxfordshire
- Region: South East
- Country: England
- Sovereign state: United Kingdom
- Post town: Witney
- Postcode district: OX29
- Dialling code: 01865
- Police: Thames Valley
- Fire: Oxfordshire
- Ambulance: South Central
- UK Parliament: Witney
- Website: Cassington Parish Council

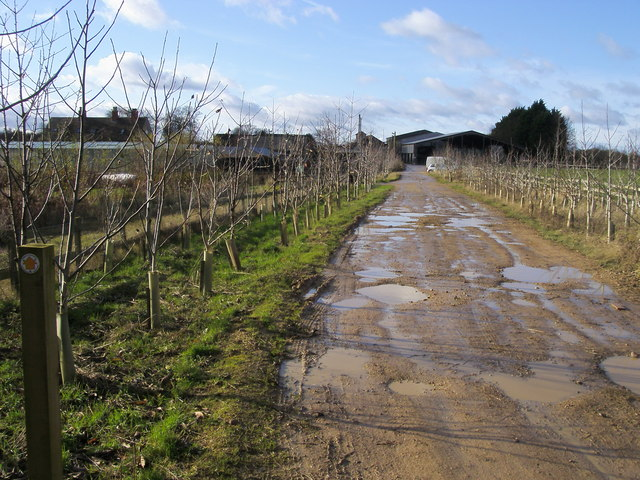
Footpath at Worton

Worton is a hamlet in Cassington civil parish, 4.5 miles (7.2 km) northwest of Oxford.

== History ==
The Domesday Book records that in 1086 William FitzOsbern, 1st Earl of Hereford owned the manor of Worton, and that Roger d'Ivry and Robert D'Oyly were the Earl's feudal tenants. However, the 1st Earl had died in 1071 and in 1075 his heir Roger de Breteuil, 2nd Earl of Hereford had forfeited his lands for his part in the Revolt of the Earls. It therefore seems that d'Ivry and D'Oyly held the manor in chief between them. By 1127 D'Oyly's share of Worton had passed to the church of St. George in Oxford Castle. After 1536 in the Dissolution of the Monasteries it passed first to Christ Church Cathedral, Oxford and then in 1546 to Christ Church college. Christ Church sold its land at Worton in the 1950s.

D'Ivry's share became part of the honour of Saint Valery. This share of Worton belonged to one of the Counts of Dreux early in the 12th century, passing to Richard, 1st Earl of Cornwall in 1237. Richard's son Edmund, 2nd Earl of Cornwall died childless in 1300 and there is no record of the overlordship of this half of Worton Manor after 1324. When the poll tax was levied in 1377 Worton had almost as many inhabitants as Cassington. However, in preceding and subsequent centuries the hamlet has been considerably smaller than Cassington. A licensed public house, the Crown, was trading in Worton from the 1750s but had closed by 1796.

== Economy ==
Commercial activities at Worton include livery stables and holiday cottages.

== Sources ==
Baggs, A.P.; Blair, W.J.; Chance, Eleanor; Colvin, Christina; Cooper, Janet; Day, C.J.; Selwyn, Nesta; Townley, S.C. (1990). Crossley, Alan; Elrington, C.R. (eds.). Victoria County History: A History of the County of Oxford, Volume 12: Wootton Hundred (South) including Woodstock. pp. 36–44. ISBN 978-0-19-722774-9.
