= Elizabeth Felmersham =

English abbess of the Benedictine Godstow Abbey

- Born: prob.Oxfordshire
- Died: 1446
- Occupation: nun
- Known for: Abbess of Godstow Abbey
- Predecessor: Elizabeth Pytte

Elizabeth Felmersham (? – 1446) became the English abbess of the Benedictine Godstow Abbey at a time when the abbey was not well regulated.

== Life ==
The details of Felmersham's early life are unclear but her family is presumed to have come from Felmersham in Bedfordshire and at some time her family moved to Oxfordshire. Records show that a William Felmersham owned property in Oxfordshire in the 1420s.

Elizabeth Pytte had been the abbess of the Benedictine Godstow Abbey when Felmersham was elected to be the abbess. The nuns were not well disciplined and she had the task of managing the abbey and in bringing the nuns into good order. The abbey had been built on an island in the River Thames just outside the university town of Oxford. The poor state of the abbey's discipline was reported in 1432.

She struggled to keep the nuns and the students apart but she admitted that "secular folk have often access to the nuns" and that she could not prevent visitors. The nuns would engage in conversation with these visitors and they did ask her permission. A nun name Alice Longspey would meet with the priest Hugh Sadler with the defence that they were kinspeople. Similarly Dame Okeley was singled out for talking too much to visitors at the door and for ignoring the instructions of Felmersham.

She was still abbess in 1445 and died the following year. The date is unknown but the Godstow community of nuns was given permission to elect a new abbess on 14 July 1446. The elected replacement was Alice Lumley.
