= River Evenlode =

River in Gloucestershire and Oxfordshire, England

Coordinates: 51°47′N 1°20′W

Evenlode River Blade (archaic)
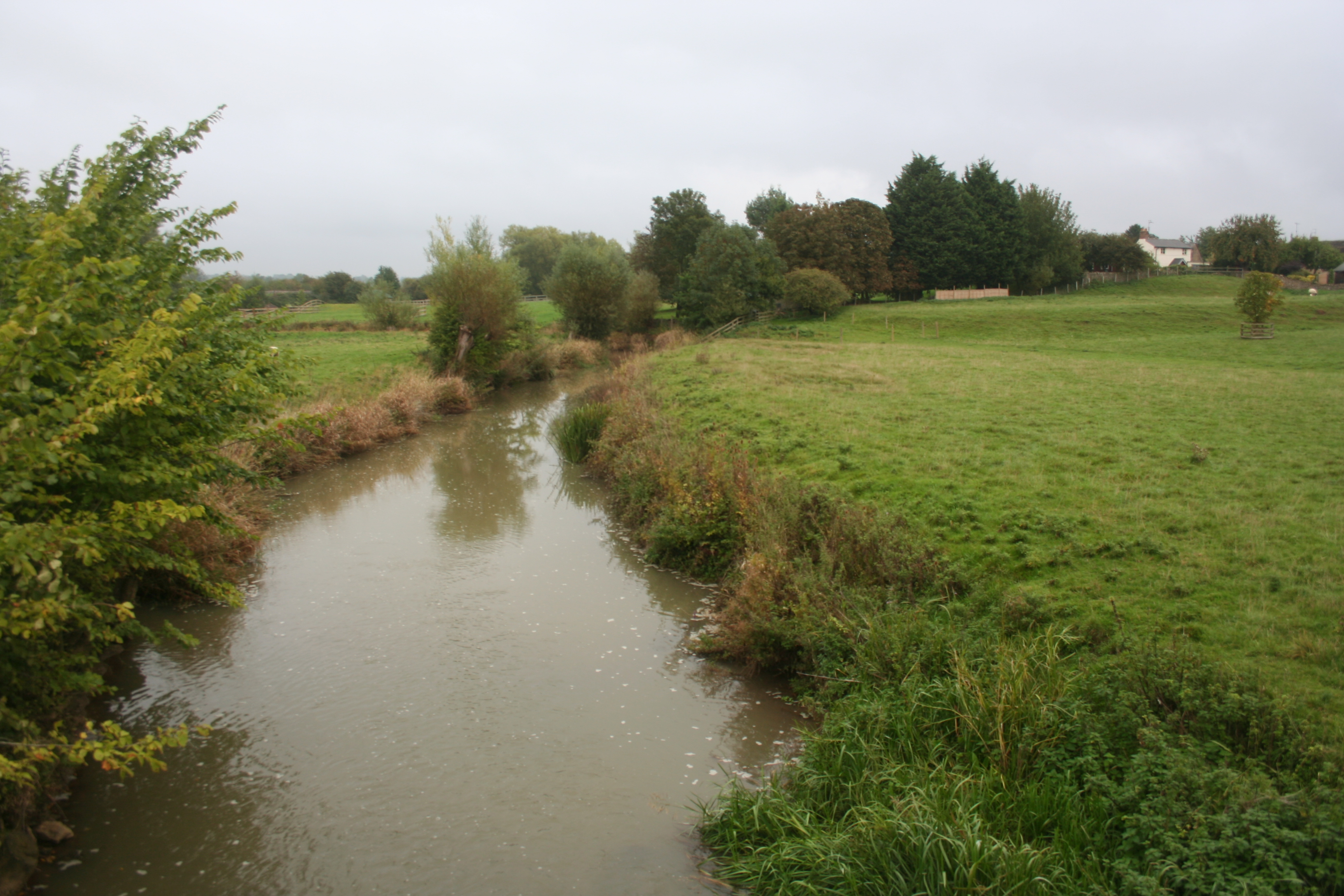
- The Evenlode at Ascott-under-Wychwood

Location
- Country: England
- Counties: Gloucestershire, Oxfordshire
- Towns/Villages: Moreton in Marsh, Evenlode, Daylesford, Ascott and Shipton-under-Wychwood, Charlbury, Cassington

Physical characteristics
- Source
  - location: Moreton-in-Marsh, Gloucestershire, Cotswold Hills
- Mouth: River Thames
  - location: Above King's Lock
- Length: 72 km (45 mi)
- Discharge
  - location: Cassington Mill
  - average: 3.70 m^{3}/s (131 cu ft/s)
  - minimum: 0.12 m^{3}/s (4.2 cu ft/s)25 August 1976
  - maximum: 26.7 m^{3}/s (940 cu ft/s)28 December 1979

Basin features
- Tributaries
  - left: River Glyme

The River Evenlode is a tributary of the Thames in Oxfordshire. It rises near Moreton-in-Marsh, Gloucestershire, in the Cotswold Hills and flows south-east to the Thames, its valley providing the route of the southern part of the Cotswold Line. The river flows for 45 miles (72 km) from source to the River Thames.

The name Evenlode is modern; until the late 1890s the river was called the River Blade, hence the name of Bladon, even though strictly Bladon is on the River Glyme, a tributary; the Ordnance Survey map of 1884 already uses the name Evenlode.

The River Evenlode passes through Evenlode, Bledington, Shipton-under-Wychwood, Ascott-under-Wychwood and Charlbury. The river joins the Thames approximately 1 mile (1.6 km) down river from Cassington on the reach above King's Lock, 3 miles (4.8 km) north-west of Oxford. Between Cassington and Eynsham, the Cassington Canal is fed by the river and joins the Thames 1/3 mile (0.5 km) upstream of the Evenlode.

The river is largely privately owned and used for fishing and other leisure activities. Powered craft are not allowed. The Environment Agency has undertaken restoration work, as of 2008, to reverse the effects of excessive dredging. Hilaire Belloc commemorated the river in some of his poetry.

== See also ==
- List of rivers in England
- Tributaries of the River Thames

Next confluence upstream	River Thames	Next confluence downstream
River Windrush (north)	River Evenlode	Dukes Cut (for Oxford Canal) (north)
