= Alice Henley =

English abbess

Alice Henley (died 1470) was an English abbess at the Benedictine Godstow Nunnery, Godstow, Oxfordshire.

== Life ==
Henley was a senior nun of Godstow Nunnery in 1445. She was elected abbess in 1446 and ruled until she died in 1470. During her rule, a royal confirmation of Godstow's foundation charters was obtained in 1462.

Her tenure as abbess was during a time when religious women's lack of education in Latin was beginning to cause administrative developments to meet their needs. She commissioned a summarised English translation of her abbey's Latin charters by a "poor brother and admirer" of Henley and her convert. He created the "English Register" which allowed the nuns to better understand their muniments and instruct their servants without having to consult an outsider. According to medieval historian Katie Ann-Marie Bugyis, the cartulary is the only one that has survived intact and is also more extensive and covers a longer time period than other cartularies of the time.
