= The Trout Inn, Lower Wolvercote =

Pub in Oxfordshire, England

Coordinates: 51°46′48″N 1°17′58″W

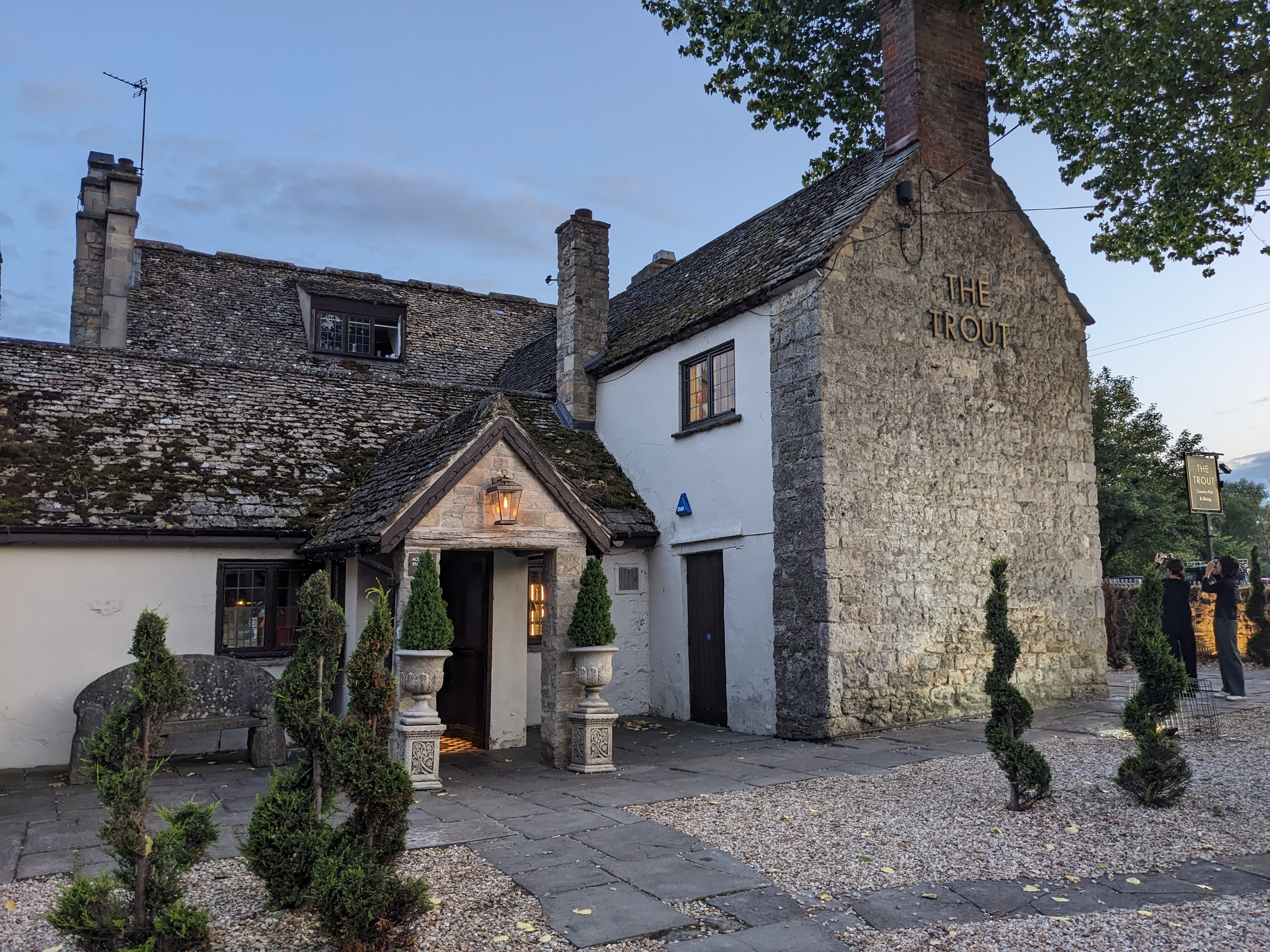
The Trout Inn entrance

The Trout Inn (often simply referred to as The Trout) is a historic pub in Lower Wolvercote north of Oxford, close to Godstow Bridge, directly by the River Thames.

== Architecture ==
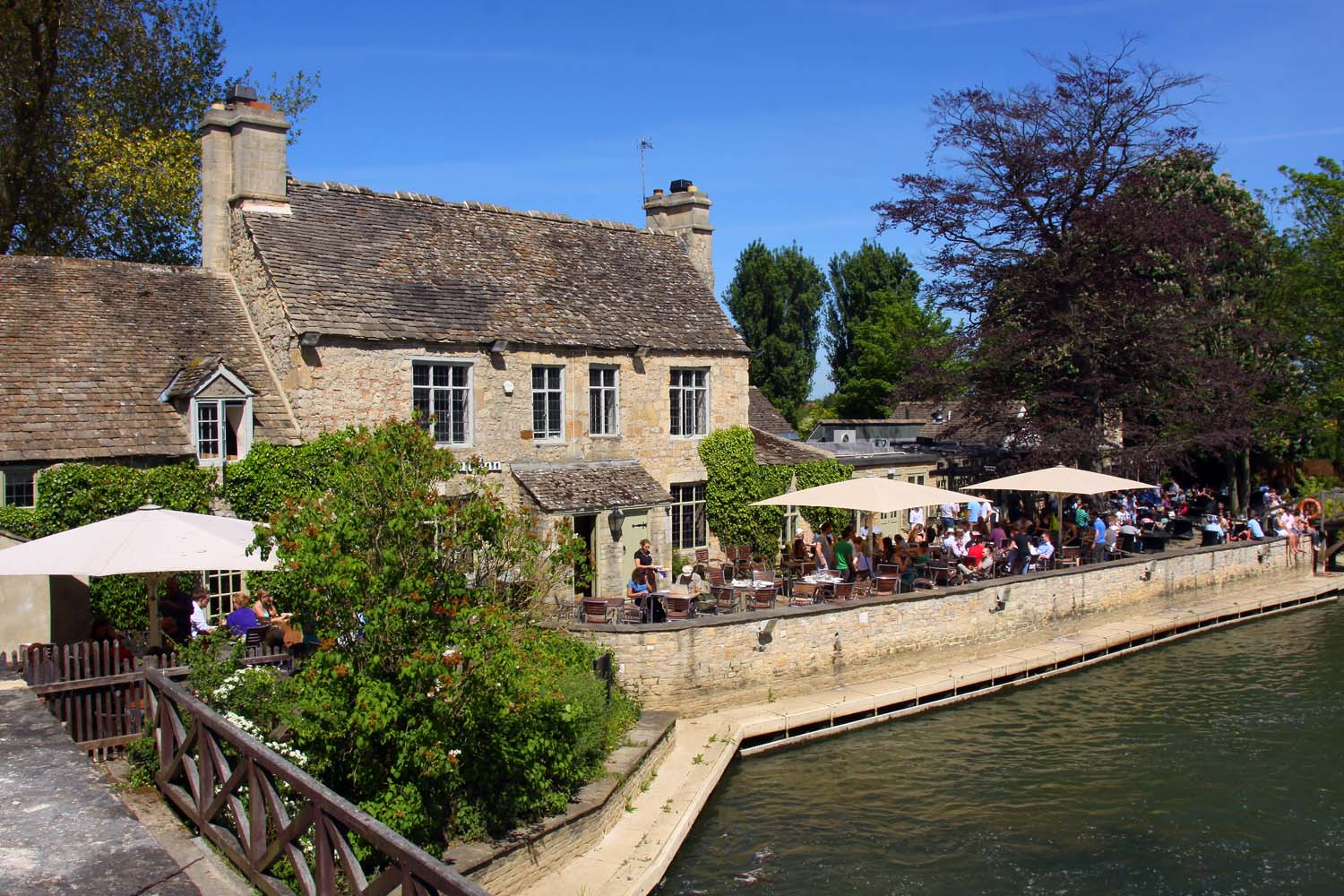
The Trout Inn, taken from Godstow Bridge

The Trout Inn is a Grade II listed building built principally in the 17th century, with some 18th-century alterations and additions. Godstow Bridge, to the south of the inn, consists of two stone arches across the Thames, the northern one dating from medieval times, and the southern rebuilt in 1892. Both bridges are also Grade II listed, as is the wooden footbridge at the Trout Inn.

== Media and celebrities ==
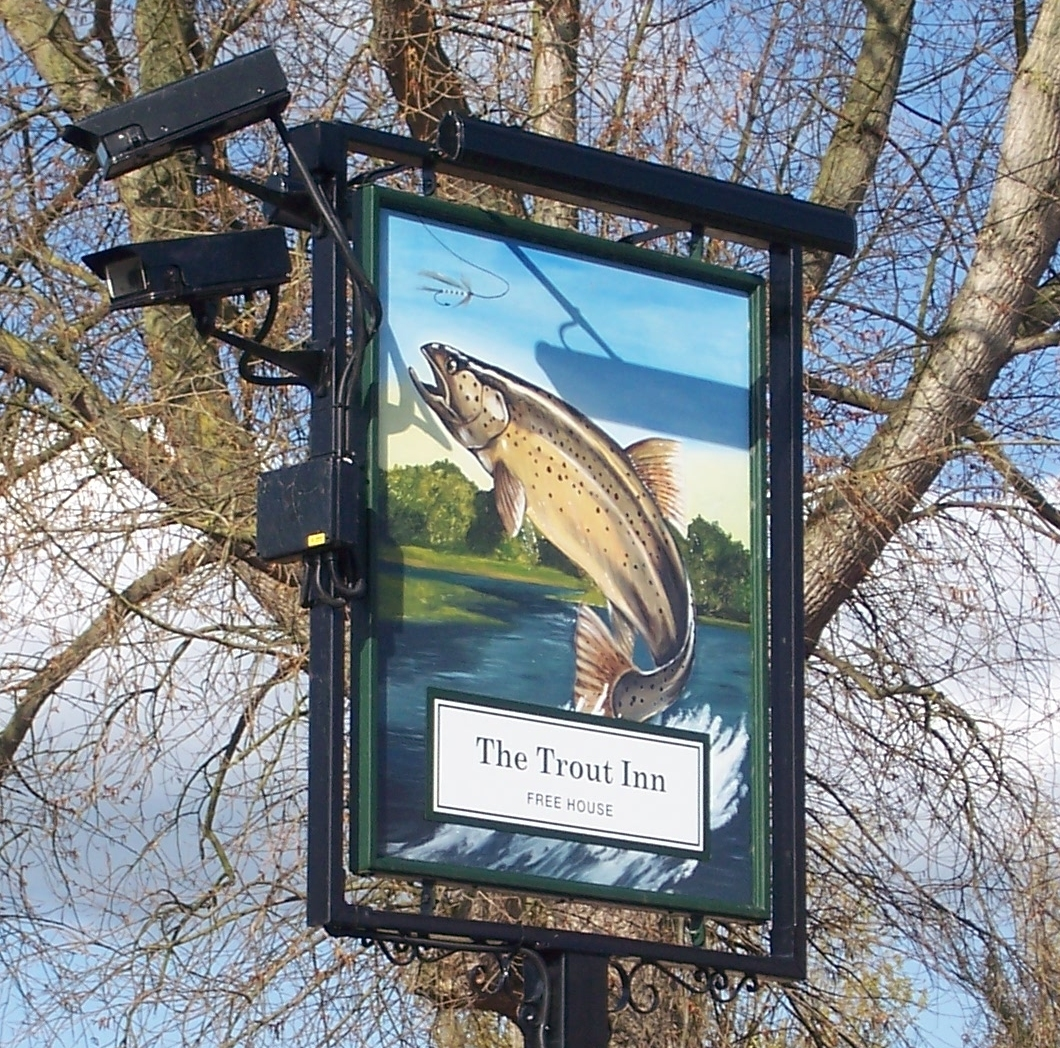
The Trout Inn sign

The pub features in Evelyn Waugh's novel Brideshead Revisited and in Colin Dexter's Inspector Morse series and its follow-on Lewis series which were both written and filmed in and around Oxford. For example, it appears in the TV episode "The Wolvercote Tongue". An alternative reality version also appears in the Philip Pullman trilogy collectively known as The Book of Dust. It also appears in the 1997 film version of The Saint. In 2001 the Trout Inn was visited by former US President Bill Clinton and his daughter Chelsea, a former graduate student at University College, Oxford.

== See also ==
- The Perch, Binsey
- Victoria Arms, Marston
