= Godstow =

Hamlet in Oxfordshire, England

Coordinates: 51.7784°N 1.2997°W

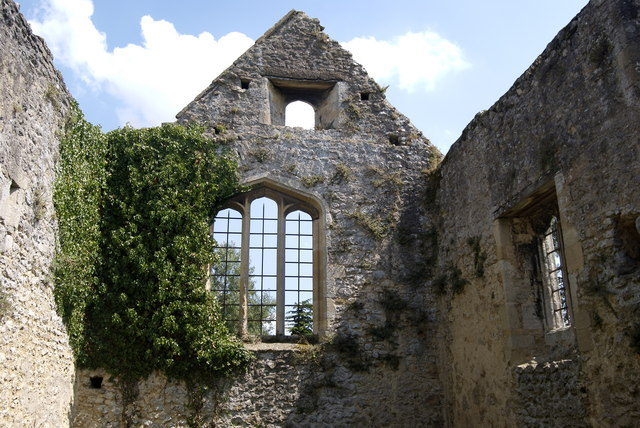
- Godstow Abbey ruins

- Location within Oxfordshire
- OS grid reference: SP484091
- District: Oxford
- Shire county: Oxfordshire
- Region: South East
- Country: England
- Sovereign state: United Kingdom
- Post town: Oxford
- Postcode district: OX2
- Dialling code: 01865
- Police: Thames Valley
- Fire: Oxfordshire
- Ambulance: South Central
- UK Parliament: Oxford West and Abingdon

Godstow is a hamlet about 2.5 miles (4 km) northwest of the centre of Oxford. It lies on the banks of the River Thames between the villages of Wolvercote to the east and Wytham to the west. The ruins of Godstow Abbey, also known as Godstow Nunnery, are here. A bridge spans the Thames and The Trout Inn is at the foot of the bridge across the river from the abbey ruins. There is also a weir and Godstow lock.

== History ==
Godstow Abbey (see detailed history below) was built here, starting in 1133. It was a house of Benedictine nuns. Rosamund Clifford, the mistress of King Henry II, retired here and died at 30 in about 1177. Her grave is somewhere in the grounds but now lost. The abbey was suppressed in 1539 under the Second Act of Dissolution.

The abbey was then converted into Godstow House by George Owen. It was occupied by his family until 1645, when the building was badly damaged in the English Civil War. After this damage, the building fell into disrepair and was used by the locals as a source of stone for their buildings.

A stone bridge was in existence in 1692, and an earlier one was probably that held by the Royalists against Parliamentarians in 1644, during the Civil War. Godstow House itself was fortified as part of the defences of Royalist Oxford against the Parliamentary army at the Siege of Oxford.

By the Thames at Lower Wolvercote and Godstow is a 17th-century public house, The Trout Inn, close to Godstow Bridge. The current bridge, in two spans, was built in 1792, the southern span being rebuilt in 1892. Godstow Lock was built here in 1790.

In Victorian times, Charles Dodgson (aka Lewis Carroll) brought Alice Liddell (aka Alice in Wonderland) and her sisters, Edith and Lorina, for river trips and picnics at Godstow.

The ruins of Godstow Abbey were used as a backdrop in the film Mamma Mia! Here We Go Again during the musical number "When I Kissed The Teacher".

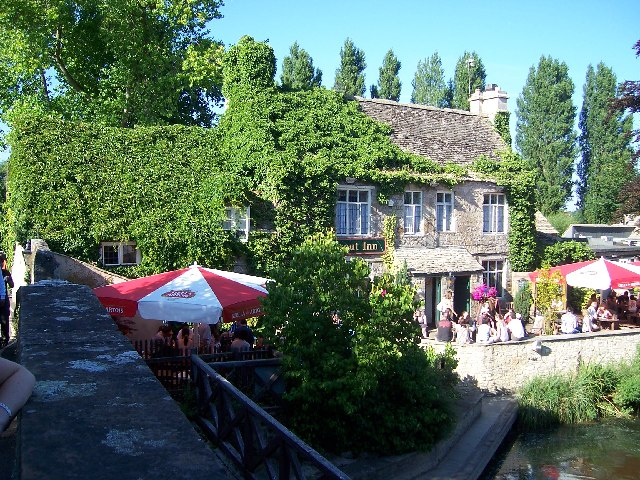
The Trout Inn from Godstow bridge

== History of Godstow Abbey ==
Godstow Abbey was built on what was then an island between streams running into the River Thames. The site was given to the founder, Edith de Launceline, in 1133 by John of St. John Edith was the widow of William and she had been living alone in Binsey in Oxfordshire, before deciding to found a group of nuns. The abbey was built in local limestone in honour of St Mary and St John the Baptist for Benedictine nuns; with a further gift of land from him, the site was later enlarged. The church was consecrated in 1139 in the presence of King Stephen. The Bishop of Lincoln confirms that it was Edith's money and will that created the community, although she had enjoyed support from Henry I of England.

The abbey was again enlarged between 1176 and 1188 when Henry II gave the establishment £258 (which included £100 for the church), 40,000 shingles, 4,000 laths, and a large quantity of timber. Because the abbey was the burial place of his mistress, Rosamund Clifford, Henry, who received patronal rights from the nuns, paid special favour to the Abbey.

In 1435 Elizabeth Felmersham became the abbess and struggled for some years to control her community. Felmersham died in 1446 and Alice Henley became the abbess, and she served until 1470. She is remembered because a "poor brother and admirer" of the abbess created the "English Register". Its purpose was to explain the accounts, in English, to the nuns but it contained other descriptive material and today it illustrates "keeping and understanding records" in English in the 15th century. According to medieval scholar and historian Katie Ann-Marie Bugyis, this cartulary is the only one that has survived intact; it is also more extensive and covers a longer time period than other cartularies of the time. In 2019, using the community's extensive records, Bugyis conducted a study of Godstow Abbey's finances and compared them to nearby men's communities, for the purpose of demonstrating "lay perceptions of and financial investments in Benedictine nuns' prayers" and to ascertain if the gender of a community's members had any effect on the rate and spiritual benefits sought by their benefactors. Bugyis also assessed donors' gender, marital status, and familial relationships with community members. She found that the prayers of the Godstow Abbey nuns were not valued less than nearby male communities, and that in some cases, they were valued more. (Note: See Bugyis, pp. 244-264.)

=== Suppression of the Abbey ===
The last abbess was Lady Katherine Bulkeley, who had been elected in 1535 at the age of around 35. Katherine was one of three nuns whose promotion to the headship of rich nunneries in the mid 1530s had been engineered (or substantially supported) by Thomas Cromwell; all three having brothers who were closely allied to Cromwell, and who represented leading families in important localities. Katherine's brother, Sir Richard Bulkeley, was acting chamberlain for North Wales; and the Bulkeley family had long dominated Anglesey as constables of Beaumaris. Surviving letters from Katherine to Cromwell show her to have been a supporter of the reform of religious houses, while also sending him suitable gifts and delicacies. At the visitation of the monasteries of 1535, John Tregonwell commended the house, saying that all was well and in good order.

But in late October 1538, the abbey at Godstow was visited by Cromwell's suppression commissioner, Dr John London who demanded access to the (enclosed) nuns to question them; and pressure them into leaving the religious life. What followed can be tracked in the letters that both Lady Katherine and John London then dispatched to Cromwell; the abbess alleging that Dr London and a body of his henchmen had been applying threats of force against her and her sisters to compel her surrender of the house, and were now refusing to leave until she had done so. Dr London's rejoinder was that it was Lady Katherine who had assaulted him and his party in the proper execution of their commission; she being supported by Thomas Powell, rector of Godstow and "naturally a rough fellow". Cromwell's letter in reply was sent back via Sir Richard Bulkeley, clearly supporting Lady Katherine. In response, Lady Katherine assured Cromwell that "there is neither pope nor purgatory, image nor pilgrimage nor praying to dead saints used or regarded amongst us." But Cromwell was unable to stop the process of dissolution forever, as it became clear that the King would not allow the continuation of any religious houses, however well run and reformed in religious life and practice. The abbey was suppressed in November 1539 under the Second Act of Dissolution; although Cromwell was able to ensure that Lady Katherine received a generous pension of fifty pounds a year.

=== Site ===
The site consisted of a guest house; a nunnery; an outer court containing a range of buildings; lodging for a priest; St Thomas's chapel, which appears to have been used as a church by the Abbey's servants; and the Abbey church, which contained cloisters along with associated buildings. The precincts were entered from the Wolvercote–Wytham road, which ran through the outer court. Here there was a two-storey main gatehouse with a large gate for carts and a second smaller one beside it for foot traffic.

George Price Boyce, the Victorian watercolour painter associated with the Pre-Raphaelite art movement, visited and painted the nunnery in 1862. During the 19th and 20th centuries, the ruined abbey was used for collecting livestock during the annual rounding up of animals on Port Meadow.

=== Rosamund Clifford's death and grave ===
The abbey was the final burial place of the famed beauty Rosamund Clifford (died c. 1176), a long-term mistress of Henry II. Henry's liaison with Rosamund became known throughout court in 1174; it ended when she retired to the nunnery at Godstow in 1176, shortly before her death.

Henry and the Clifford family paid for her tomb in the choir of the convent's church at Godstow, and gave an endowment for it to be tended by the nuns. It became a popular local shrine until 1191, two years after Henry's death. Hugh of Lincoln, Bishop of Lincoln, while visiting Godstow, noticed Rosamund's tomb right in front of the high altar. The tomb was laden with flowers and candles, demonstrating that the local people were still praying there. Calling Rosamund a harlot, the bishop ordered her remains removed from the church. Her tomb was moved outside the abbey church to the cemetery at the nuns' chapter house next to it, where it could still be visited, but it was destroyed in the Dissolution of the Monasteries under Henry VIII.

Paul Hentzner, a German traveller who visited England c.1599, records that her faded tombstone inscription read in part:

... Adorent, Utque tibi detur requies Rosamunda precamur.
("Let them adore ... and we pray that rest be given to you, Rosamund.")

Followed by a punning epitaph:

Hic jacet in tumba Rosamundi non Rosamunda
Non redolet sed olet, quae redolere solet.
("Here in the tomb lies a rose of the world, not a pure rose; She who used to smell sweet, still smells — but not sweet.")

=== Other burials ===
- Walter de Clifford (died 1190)
- Walter de Clifford (died 1221)
- Isabella de Braose

== Godstowe School ==
The Godstowe School, a feeder preparatory school for Wycombe Abbey, was founded on land formerly owned by Godstow Abbey in High Wycombe.

== Gallery ==
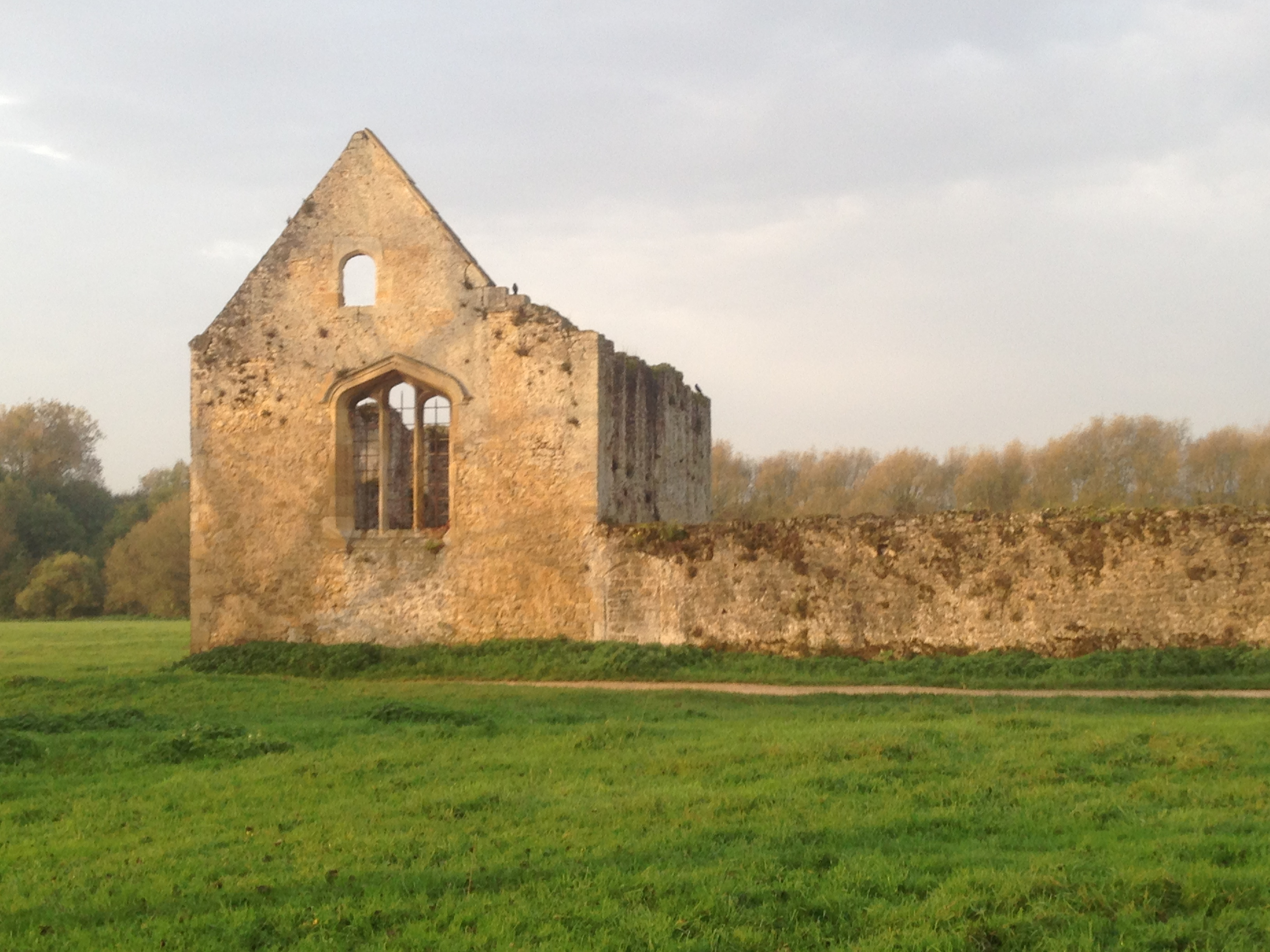
Godstow Abbey ruins from the east

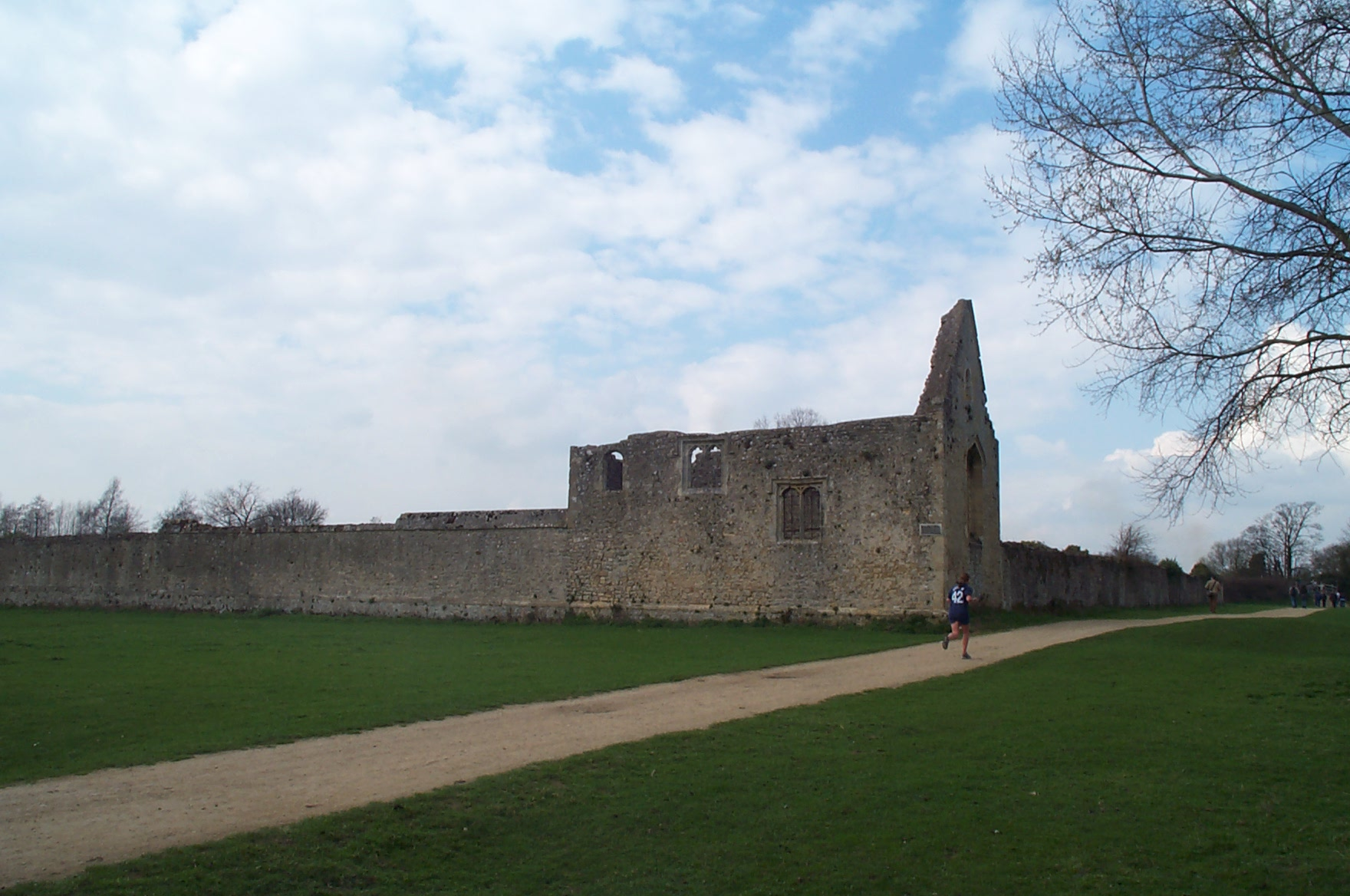
Godstow Abbey ruins from the south

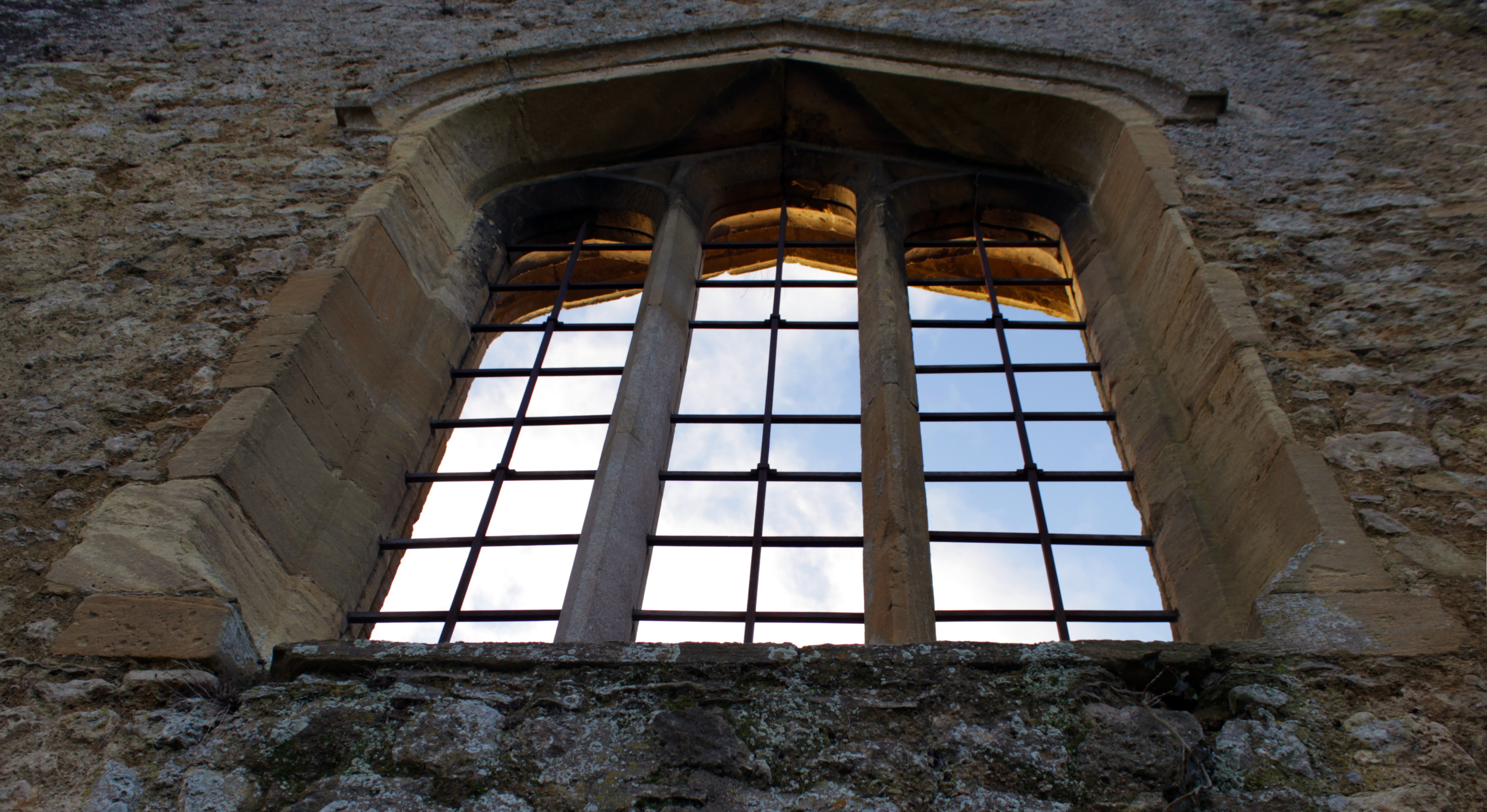
The window of Godstow Nunnery

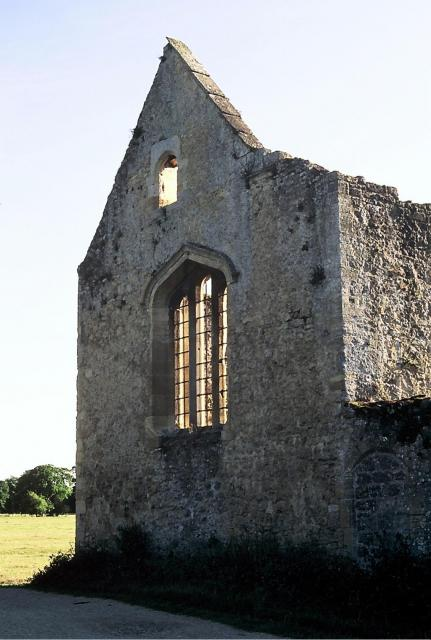
Ruin of Godstow Abbey

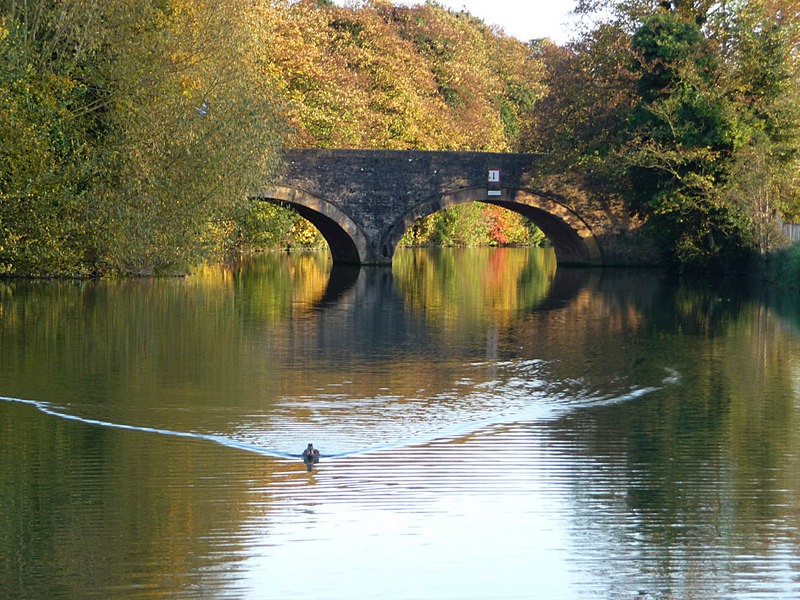
Godstow Bridge from the north

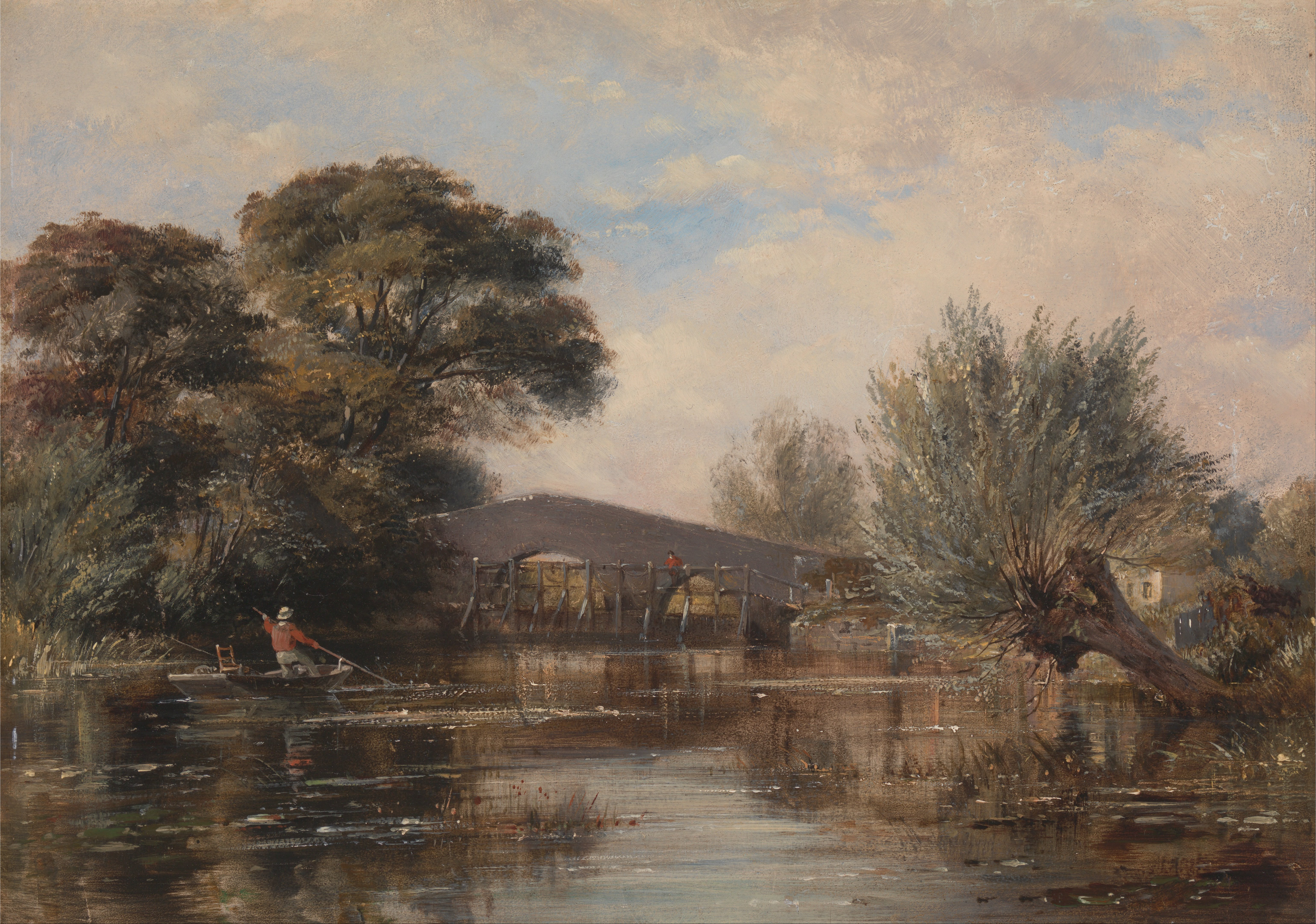
Godstow Bridge near Oxford by Edward William Cooke, 1835

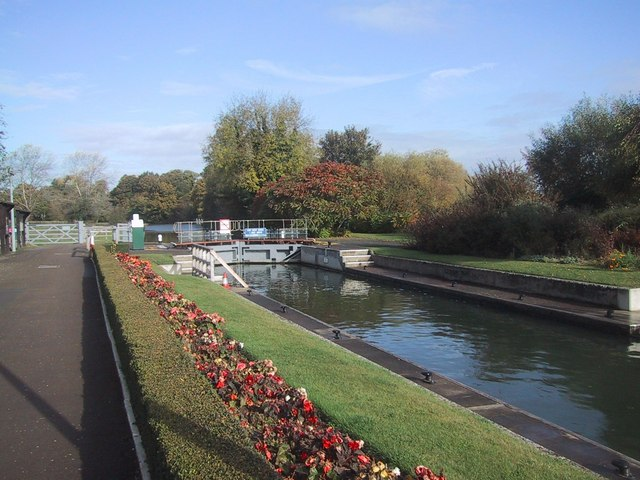
Godstow Lock on the River Thames

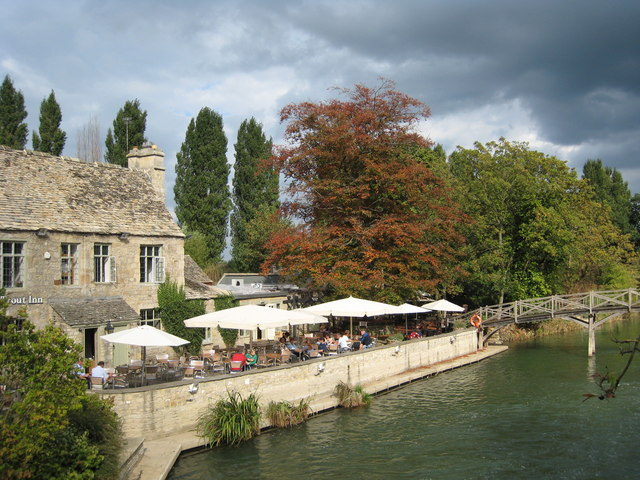
The Trout Inn by the Thames at Godstow
