= Wolvercote =

Village in Oxford, England

Coordinates: 51.785°N 1.290°W

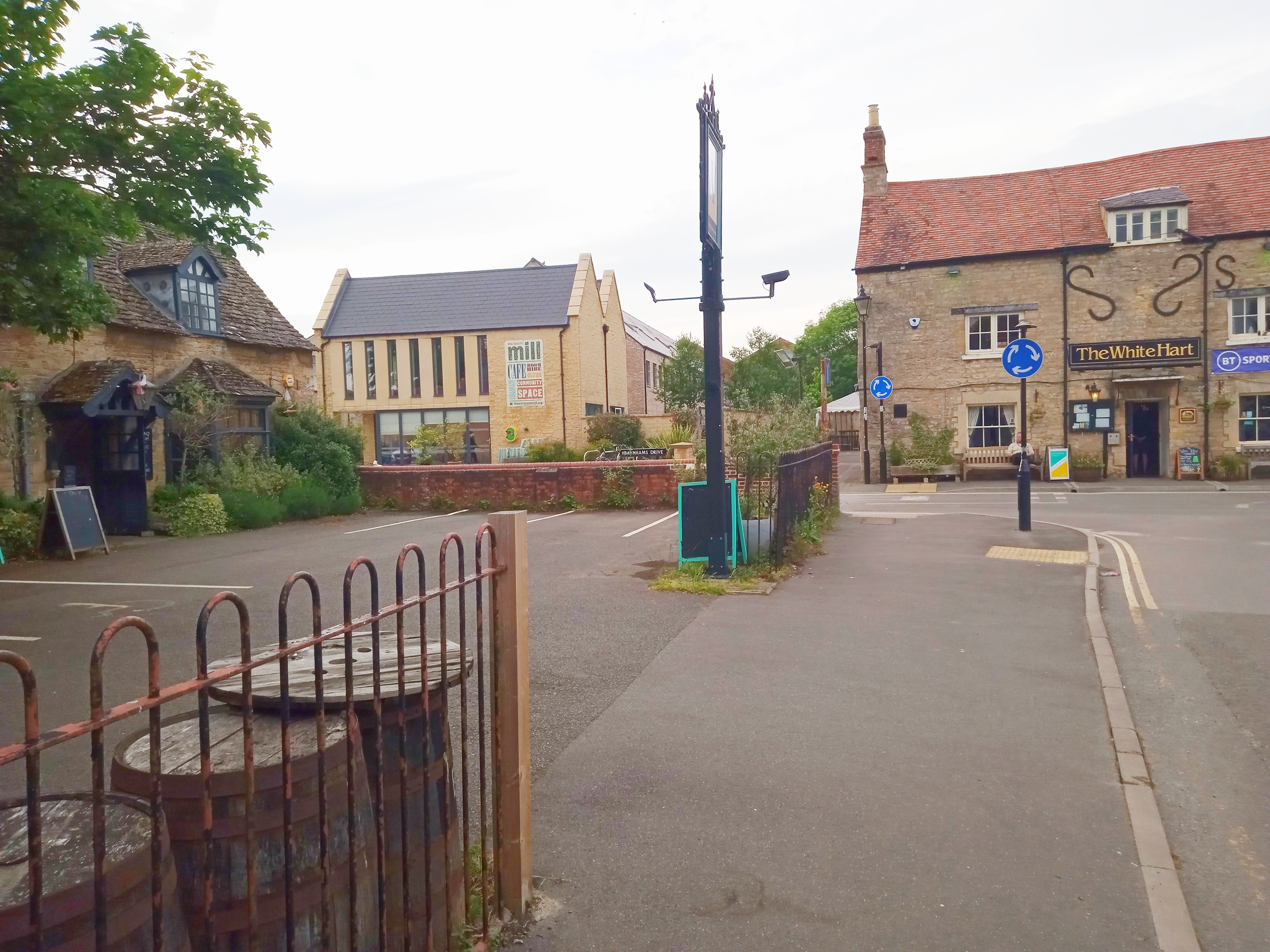
- Wolvercote Mill

- Location within Oxfordshire
- OS grid reference: SP490098
- Civil parish: unparished
- District: Oxford
- Shire county: Oxfordshire
- Region: South East
- Country: England
- Sovereign state: United Kingdom
- Post town: Oxford
- Postcode district: OX2
- Dialling code: 01865
- Police: Thames Valley
- Fire: Oxfordshire
- Ambulance: South Central
- UK Parliament: Oxford West and Abingdon
- Website: Wolvercote Commoners Committee

Wolvercote is a village in the Oxford district, in the county of Oxfordshire, England. It is about 3 miles (5 km) northwest of the city centre, on the northern edge of Wolvercote Common, which is itself north of Port Meadow and adjoins the River Thames.

== History ==
The Domesday Book of 1086 lists the village as Ulfgarcote (cottage of Woolgar; or Woolgar's place). The toponym had become "Wolvercote" by 1185. Wolvercote housing faced onto its extensive commons, which provided much of the community's livelihood. Some residents still have ancient rights on the commons. Geese rearing was once an important local activity, and a goose is still one of the village symbols. Horses and cattle are still grazed on Wolvercote Common and Port Meadow. In 1789 the Oxford Canal divided the village into two parts, and in 1846 the Oxford and Rugby Railway was built beside the canal through the village. In 1850 the Buckinghamshire Railway was completed through a tunnel and cutting along the eastern edge of Upper Wolvercote.

The western edge of Upper Wolvercote parallels the Oxford canal at Wolvercote Green and fades into North Oxford suburbia to the east. Lower Wolvercote borders the River Thames at Godstow to the west, and Port Meadow and the canal to the east. The mill stream takes its water from the nearby River Thames, and is crossed in Wolvercote at a former toll-bridge. The bridge bears a plaque in memory of two airmen of the Royal Flying Corps who were killed nearby in a flying accident in 1912. Part of Port Meadow was used as a military airfield in the First World War; the Royal Artillery also had a base there. In 1940, a camp was set up on the meadow for evacuees from Dunkirk.

The paper mill in Lower Wolvercote, former supplier of paper to the Oxford University Press, was once a major local employer. It was in existence by 1720, when it was bought by the 1st Duke of Marlborough. From 1782 the mill was leased to Oxford printer and publisher William Jackson, proprietor of the local newspaper Jackson's Oxford Journal which was published until 1928. The mill was entirely water-powered until 1811, when a steam engine was installed to power the paper-making process. The engine consumed 100 tons of coal per week, which was brought by narrowboat down the Oxford Canal, along Duke's Cut, and then down the mill stream which at the time was navigable as far as a wharf at the mill.

In 1921 the civil parish named "Wolvercott" had a population of 1351. On 1 April 1929 the parish was abolished and merged with St Giles and St John and Cutteslowe.

Two of the narrowboats belonged to the mill, having been bought in 1856 and plying between there and the Midlands for 60 years until the mill sold them in 1916. Narrowboats continued to serve Wolvercote until at least the 1950s, by which time the mill used mechanical equipment to unload them. The mill was rebuilt in 1955, ceased paper-making in 1998 and was demolished in 2004. The University of Oxford planned to develop the site as housing for its staff, but faced rising cost estimates and local objections. The site was eventually sold to developer Cala Homes for a development of around 190 houses.

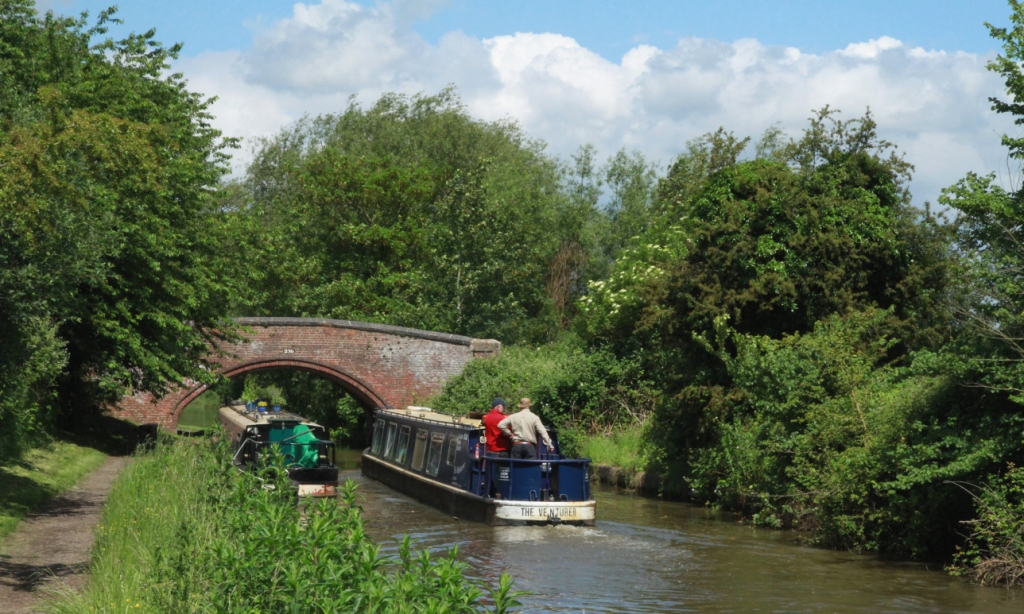
Bridge and narrowboats on the Oxford Canal near the Plough Inn.

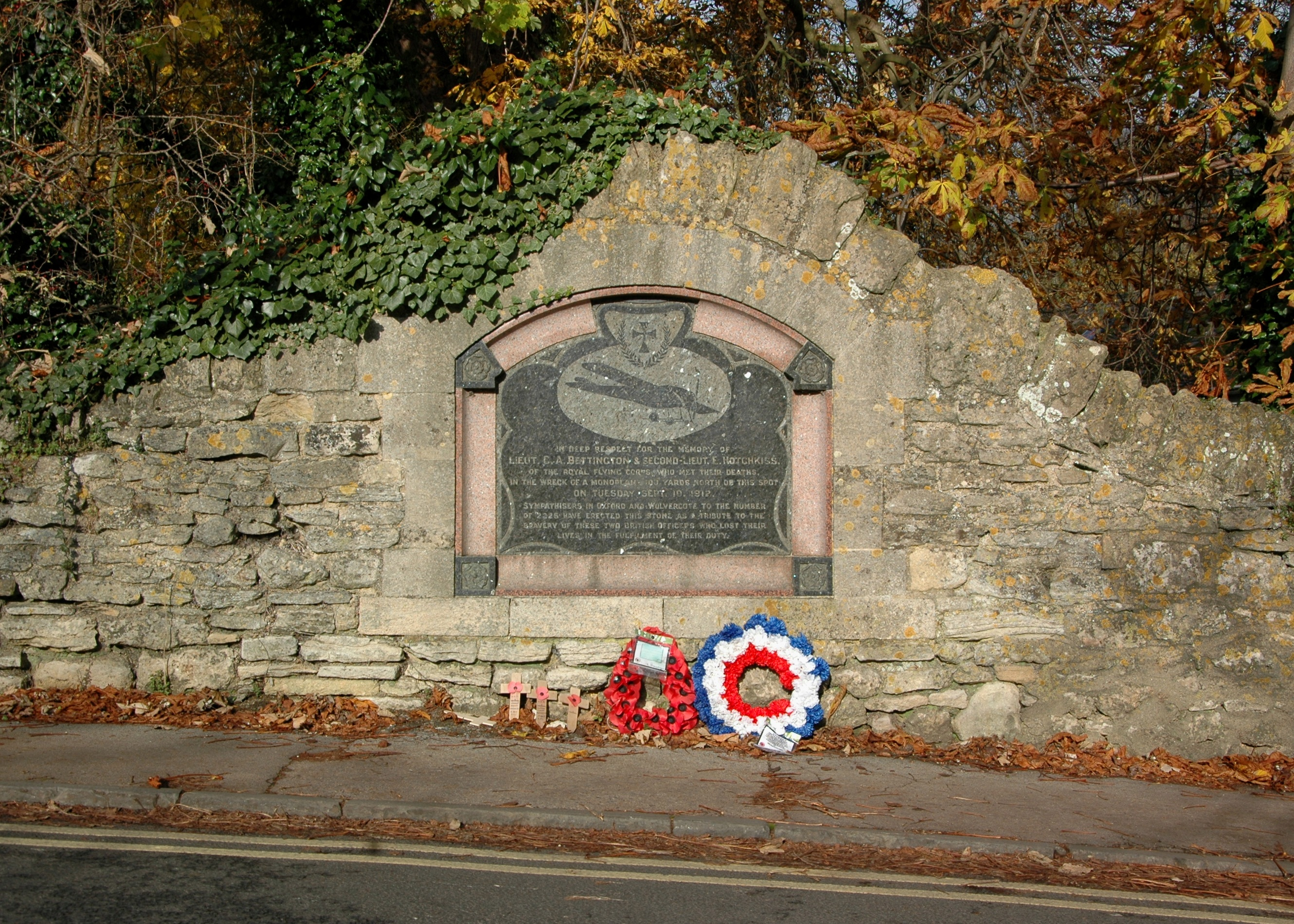
RFC airmen's monument on the Toll Bridge

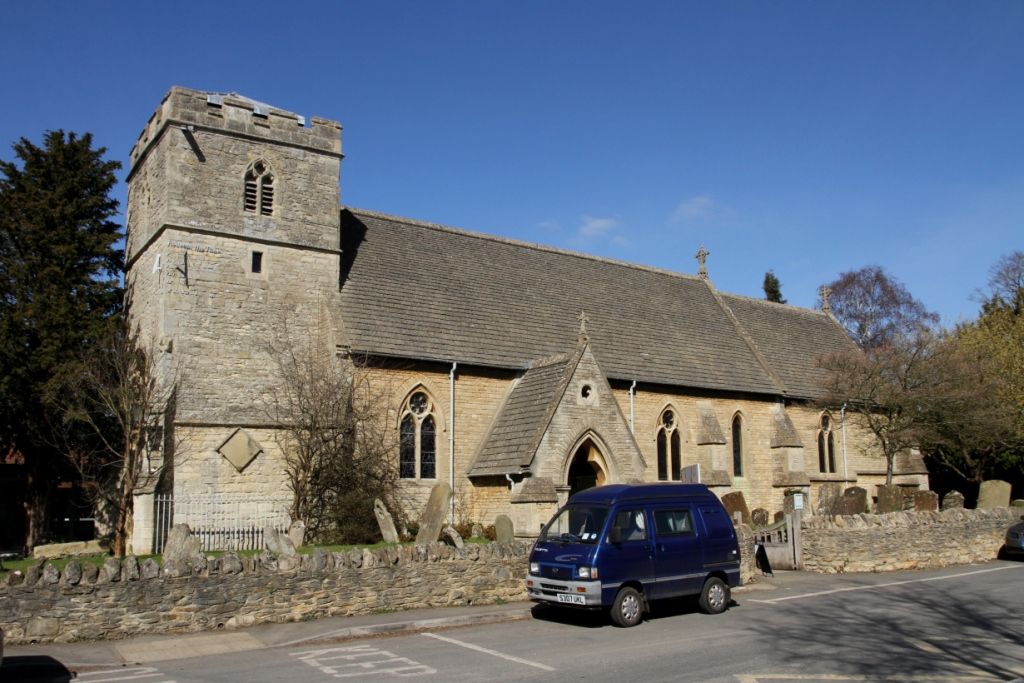
St Peter's parish church

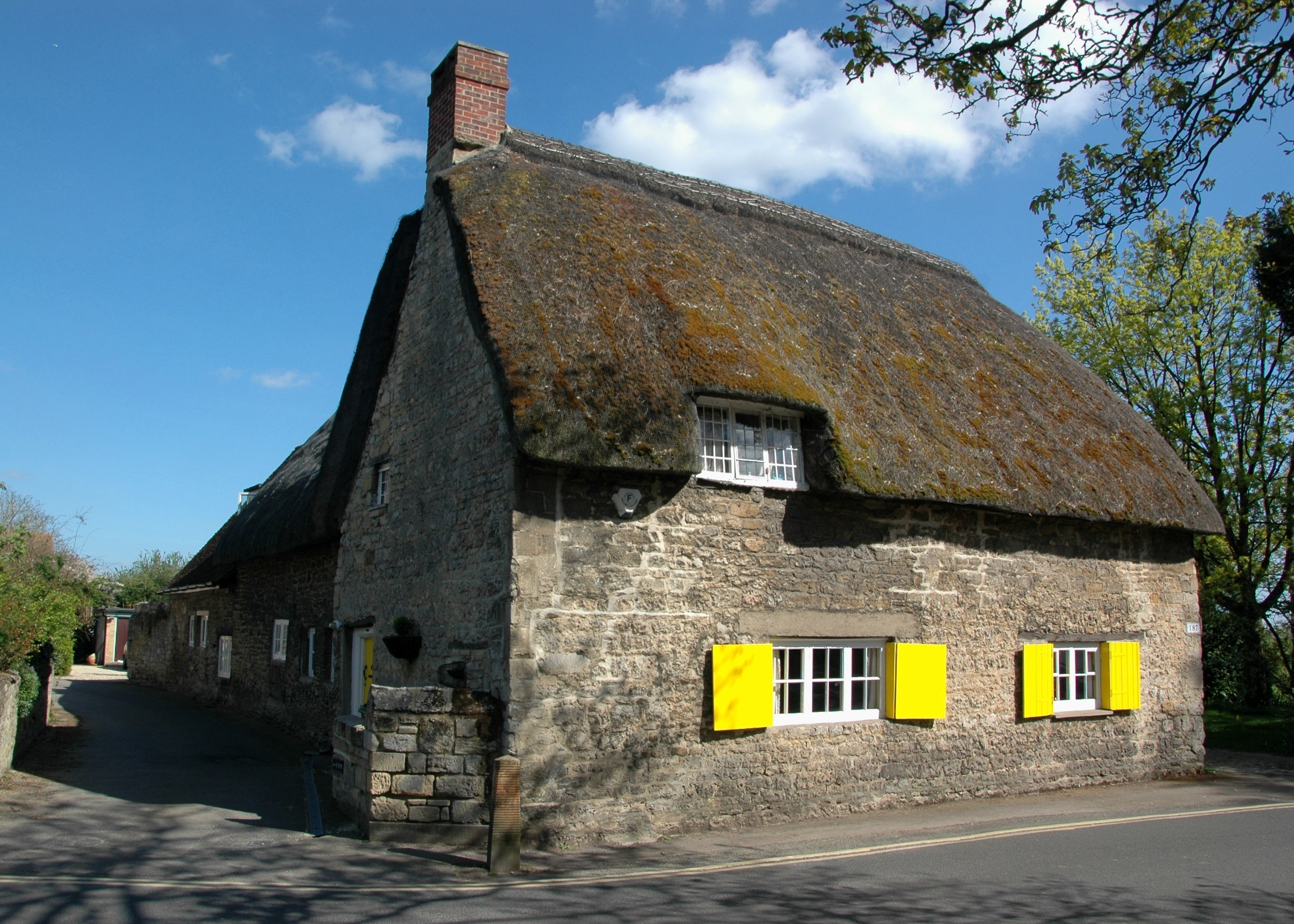
17th-century thatched cottage in Godstow Road

== Parish church ==
The Church of St Peter is in Upper Wolvercote. It has a 14th-century west tower with a 15th-century window and doorway. In 1860 the church except for the tower was demolished, and rebuilt to Gothic Revival designs by the architect Charles Buckeridge. The Norman tub font and a 14th-century south window of the chancel were retained, as well as 17th- and 18th-century monuments to the Walter family.

== Cemetery ==
Wolvercote Cemetery is in the parish on Five Mile Drive between Banbury Road and Woodstock Road, just north of the Oxford Ring Road. The graves include those of J. R. R. Tolkien and Sir Thomas Chapman, father of T. E. Lawrence. A paper sign in the parish church warns people that Tolkien is not buried in the churchyard, and provides directions to the cemetery. The writer and poet John Wain moved to Wolvercote in 1960.

== Education ==
A National School was founded in 1817 in the Glebe house; it moved to land to the west of the church in 1856. Wolvercote Infants' School (Upper Wolvercote) was built in 1897, on land given by the Duke of Marlborough, and was opened on 11 May 1898. Under Oxfordshire County Council it became a "first school" in 1974, taking children from 5 to 9 years old, but following a re-organisation of Oxford's schools in 2002, it was extended to become Wolvercote Primary School with an attached nursery school, taking children from 4 to 11 years. After the age of 11, most children move up to attend Cherwell School in Summertown. A school was opened at Wolvercote Paper Mill but has now been converted into housing.

== Public houses ==
Wolvercote has four public houses. The Wolvercote and the White Hart are by the central small green in Lower Wolvercote. The Wolvercote used to be called Jacob's Inn and the Red Lion before that. The White Hart is now owned by the Wolvercote community and is a free house. The Plough Inn, controlled by Greene King Brewery, is by the green and the canal in Upper Wolvercote. The Trout Inn which is opposite the Godstow Nunnery ruins. The Trout Inn is owned by Mitchells and Butler's.

== Railways ==
The Great Western Railway had a halt, Wolvercote Platform, just north of the railway bridge on Godstow Road. It closed in 1916. The London and North Western Railway opened Wolvercote Halt on the Varsity Line just south of the railway bridge on First Turn in 1905. The London, Midland and Scottish Railway closed Wolvercote Halt in 1926.

== In popular culture ==
Wolvercote was featured in a 1987 episode of the ITV detective drama Inspector Morse, in which a wealthy American tourist was found dead in her hotel room shortly after arriving in Oxford to return a valuable artifact, the Wolvercote Tongue, one-half of an ancient belt buckle, to an Oxford archaeological museum. In the novel related to the television episode, The Jewel That Was Ours, the valuable tongue is never given to the museum, as it is stolen for the insurance money.

The Anglo-Saxon-era Wolvercote Trove, which included the Tongue, features in the Inspector Morse "prequel" series Endeavour episode "Trove" (Season 2, Ep. 1, 2014).

== Sources ==
- Carter, Harry (1957). Wolvercote Mill. A study in Paper-making at Oxford. Oxford: Clarendon Press.
- Compton, Hugh J (1976). The Oxford Canal. Newton Abbot: David & Charles. ISBN 0-7153-7238-6.
- Crossley, Alan; Elrington, C.R. (eds.); Baggs, A.P.; Blair, W.J.; Chance, Eleanor; Colvin, Christina; Cooper, Janet; Day, C.J.; Selwyn, Nesta; Townley, Simon C. (1990). A History of the County of Oxford. Victoria County History. Vol. 12: Wootton Hundred (South) including Woodstock. London: Oxford University Press for the Institute of Historical Research. pp. 304–325. ISBN 978-0-19722-774-9.
- Hibbert, Christopher, ed. (1988). "Wolvercote". The Encyclopaedia of Oxford. London: Macmillan. pp. 498–499. ISBN 0-333-39917-X.
- Oxford City Council (2007). Wolvercote with Godstow Conservation Area Appraisal. Oxford: Oxford City Council.
- Sherwood, Jennifer; Pevsner, Nikolaus (1974). Oxfordshire. The Buildings of England. Harmondsworth: Penguin Books. pp. 851–852. ISBN 0-14-071045-0.
- Spokes Symonds, Anne (1997). Changing Faces of Wolvercote. Oxford: Alden Press. ISBN 1-899536-13-2.
- Venables, Cedric (1976) [1960]. The Church and Parish of St. Peter Wolvercote (Second ed.). Oxford: Oxford University Press.
