= Pinkhill Lock =

Lock on the River Thames in Oxfordshire, England

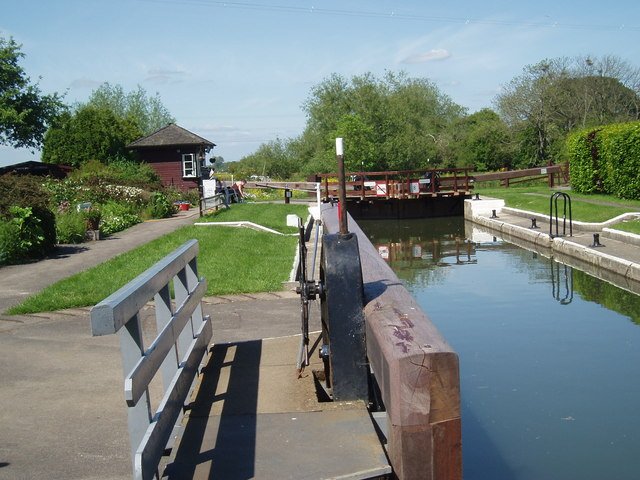
- 51.760142°N 1.363602°W
- Waterway: River Thames
- County: Oxfordshire
- Maintained by: Environment Agency
- Operation: Manual
- First built: 1791
- Latest built: 1898
- Length: 34.59 m (113 ft 6 in)
- Width: 4.90 m (16 ft 1 in)
- Fall: 1.05 m (3 ft 6 in)
- Above sea level: 199'
- Distance to Teddington Lock: 101 miles

Pinkhill Lock is a lock on the River Thames in England. It is close to Farmoor, Oxfordshire.

The first lock was built of stone by Daniel Harris for the Thames Navigation Commission in 1791.

The weir is on the other side of the island and carries a public footbridge. The name Luck's or Lot's Hole is given to part of the weir stream.

== History ==
The lock is named after a farm in the area and is on the site of a former weir and flash lock owned by Lord Harcourt who maintained rights over it. It is one of the commission's early locks and like St John's was built by J. Nock. The lock was partially rebuilt in 1877 and a house was proposed at the same time. Previously the keeper lived at Eynsham and covered the whole stretch from Newbridge to King's Weir. A new cut was dug below the lock by 1899 when some reconstruction was carried out. The stone lock keeper's house dates from 1932.

== Access to the lock ==
The lock can be reached (by authorised vehicles or on foot) from Farmoor on a track behind the reservoir.

== Reach above the lock ==
The river winds past Farmoor Reservoir and Bablock Hythe where there used to be a ferry. This part of the river was frequented by Matthew Arnold and his "Scholar Gipsy".

The Thames Path crosses the river over the lock head gates to the northern bank towards Stanton Harcourt, and rejoins the river at Bablockhythe. It then continues alongside the river to Northmoor Lock.

== See also ==
- Locks on the River Thames
- Crossings of the River Thames

== Sources ==
- H.M. Colvin (1997). A Biographical Dictionary of British Architects, 1600-1840. New Haven: Yale University Press. p. 484. ISBN 0-300-07207-4.
- Thacker, Fred. S. (1968) [1920]. The Thames Highway: Volume II Locks and Weirs. Newton Abbot: David and Charles.

Next lock upstream	River Thames	Next lock downstream
Northmoor Lock; 6.21 km (3.86 mi)	Pinkhill Lock; Grid reference: SP440071	Eynsham Lock; 2.38 km (1.48 mi)
Next crossing upstream	River Thames	Next crossing downstream
Hart's Weir Footbridge	Pinkhill Lock	Swinford Toll Bridge
Next crossing upstream	Thames Path	Next crossing downstream
northern bank Newbridge	Pinkhill Lock	southern bank Medley Footbridge
