= Northmoor Lock =

Lock on the River Thames in Oxfordshire, England

Coordinates: 51.71598°N 1.37754°W

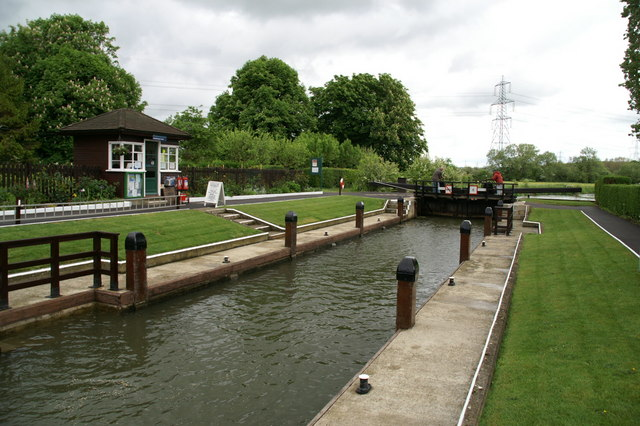
- Northmoor Lock
- Waterway: River Thames
- County: Oxfordshire
- Maintained by: Environment Agency
- Operation: Manual
- First built: 1896
- Length: 34.59 m (113 ft 6 in)
- Width: 4.59 m (15 ft 1 in)
- Fall: 1.24 m (4 ft 1 in)
- Above sea level: 203'
- Distance to Teddington Lock: 105

Northmoor Lock is a lock on the River Thames in Oxfordshire, England, on the northern bank about a mile from Northmoor.

The lock was built in 1896 by the Thames Conservancy to replace a flash lock at Hart's Weir, also known as Ridge's Weir, about a mile upstream and another at Ark Weir downstream. The lock house, lock and weir are relatively little changed since they were built and they can be viewed as a group from the Thames Path and from the river

The weir is just the other side of the lock island and is one of only two remaining complete Paddle and rymer (or rimer) manually operated weirs.

== Access to the lock ==
The lock is remote from the village of Northmoor and some distance walk across country. It can be reached by the Thames Path from Bablock Hythe and Newbridge.

== Reach above the lock ==
Along the reach is the Hart's Weir Footbridge on the site of the old weir. Further along, the river is crossed by the 13th century Newbridge at the confluence of the River Windrush.

The Thames Path follows the northern bank to Newbridge, and then crosses over and continues on the south bank to Shifford. There it crosses again, over the old course of the river, to Shifford Lock and then crossed the lock cu towards Chimney Meadows.

== See also ==
- Locks on the River Thames

Next lock upstream	River Thames	Next lock downstream
Shifford Lock; 7.63 km (4.74 mi)	Northmoor Lock; Grid reference: SP431021	Pinkhill Lock; 6.21 km (3.86 mi)
