= Eynsham Lock =

Coordinates: 51.77432°N 1.35790°W

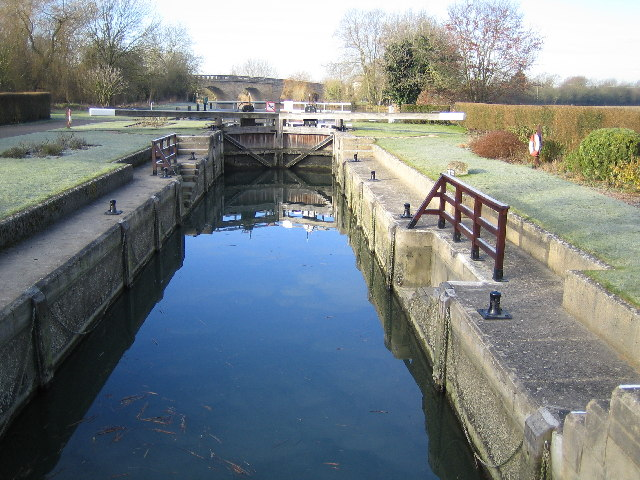
- Waterway: River Thames
- County: Oxfordshire
- Maintained by: Environment Agency
- Operation: Manual
- First built: 1928
- Length: 34.51 m (113 ft 3 in)
- Width: 4.97 m (16 ft 4 in)
- Fall: 0.84 m (2 ft 9 in)
- Above sea level: 195'
- Distance to Teddington Lock: 100 miles

Eynsham Lock is a lock on the River Thames in England. It is on the southern bank near Swinford Oxfordshire. The large village of Eynsham is a little distance away on the northern bank.

The lock was one of the last pound locks built on the Thames being built by the Thames Conservancy in 1928.

The weir is on the other side of the island on the original course of the river.

== History ==
There was previously a weir and flash lock known as Eynsham or Bolde's weir, originally owned by Eynsham Abbey. The weir was rebuilt in 1886 after there had been some proposals for removing it and around 1890 a boat slide was built for the portage of small boats. It was replaced by the pound lock in 1928 which was cut across the neck of a bend. The weir was reconstructed in 1950.

== Access to the lock ==
The lock is close to the B4044 road where it crosses the river at Swinford Toll Bridge and is accessible on foot. There is a permissive path across the lock and weir.

== Reach above the lock ==
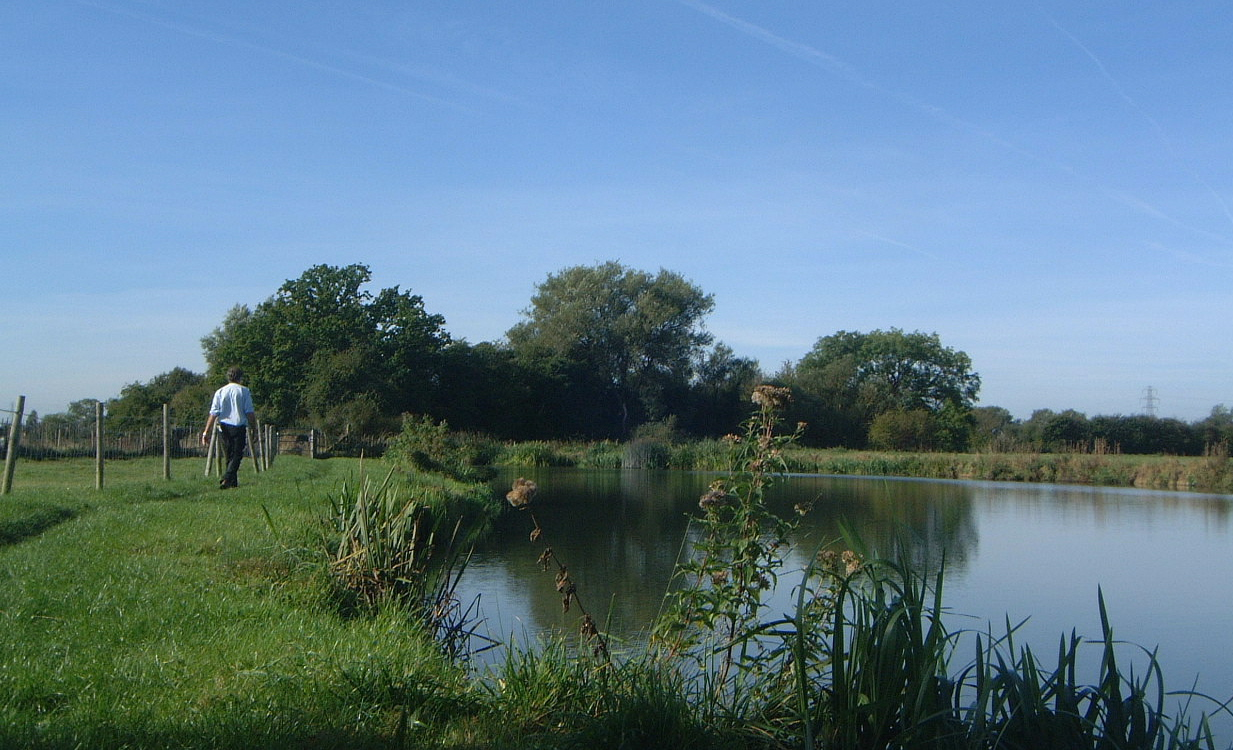
The river upstream of Eynsham Lock

A short distance upstream of the lock is Swinford Toll Bridge. After the bridge there used to be a very sharp horseshoe bend which gave problems to navigation until a cut was built across it in 1900. The river continues to head south west through predominantly open country. The only interruption is a large marina on the eastern bank.

The Thames Path follows the southern bank to Pinkhill Lock.

== See also ==
- Locks on the River Thames

Next lock upstream	River Thames	Next lock downstream
Pinkhill Lock; 2.38 km (1.48 mi)	Eynsham Lock; Grid reference: SP444086	King's Lock; 4.37 km (2.72 mi)
