= Thames Conservancy =

Managed London's River Thames (1857–1909)

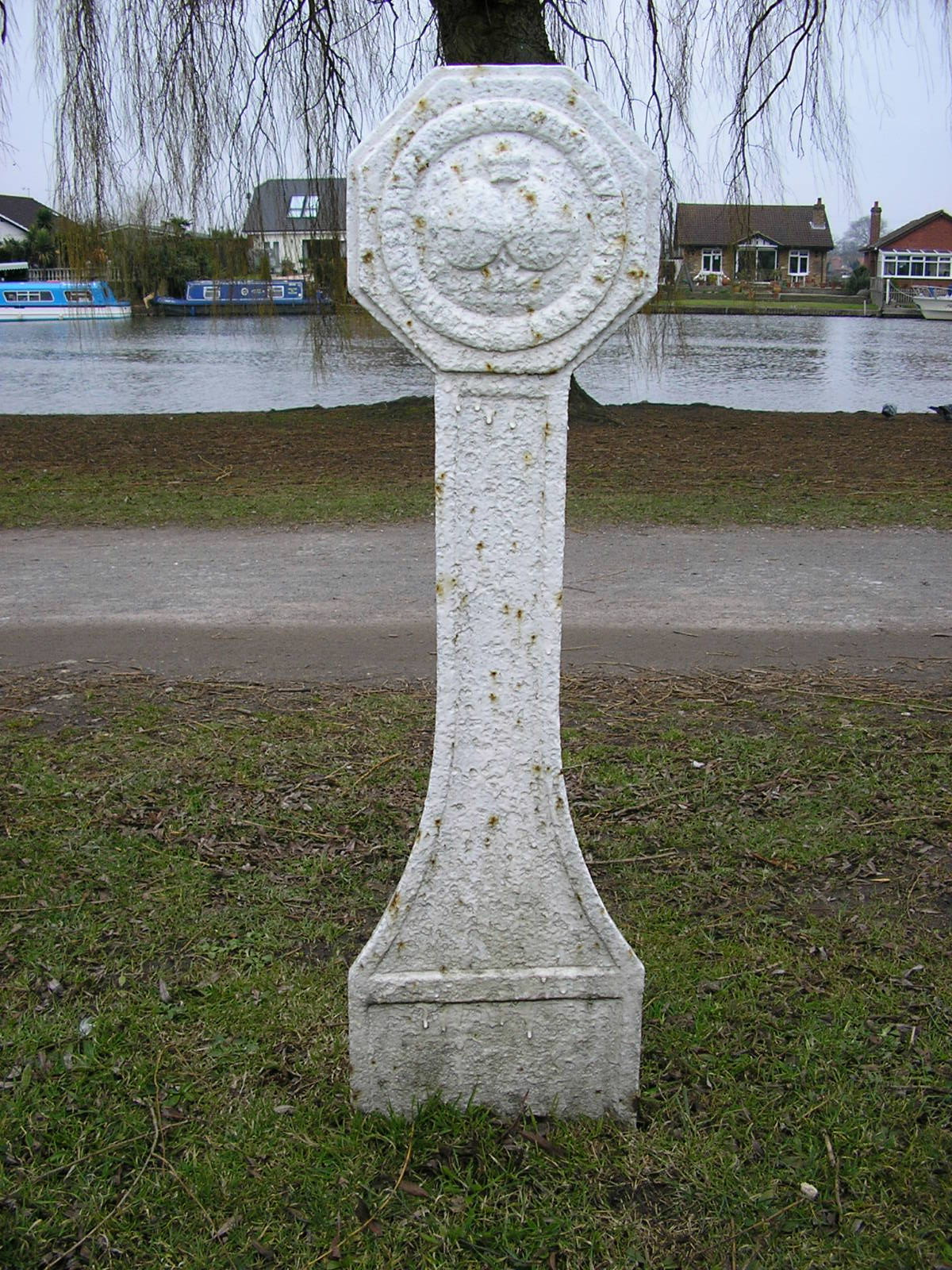
A boundary marker of the Thames Conservancy at grid reference TQ092664 about 100 metres upstream from the bridge at Walton-on-Thames.

The Thames Conservancy (formally the Conservators of the River Thames) was a body responsible for the management of that river in England. It was founded in 1857 to replace the jurisdiction of the City of London up to Staines. Nine years later it took on the whole river from Cricklade in Wiltshire to the sea at Yantlet Creek on the Isle of Grain. Its territory was reduced when the Tideway (upper and lower estuary) was transferred to the Port of London Authority in 1909.

In 1974 the conservancy was taken into the Thames Water Authority, later to devolve to the Environment Agency in almost all respects.

== History ==
=== Background ===
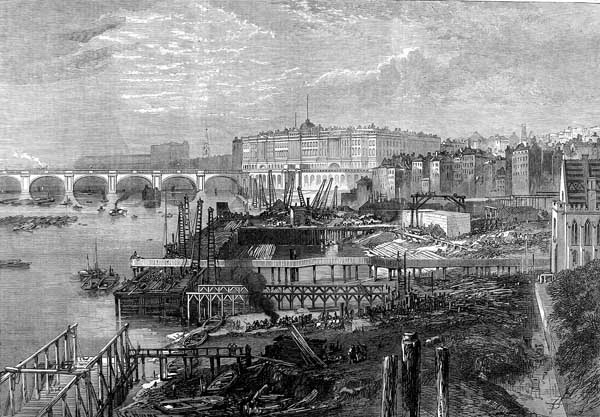
The Victoria Embankment under construction in 1865

The stretch of river between the town of Staines, just to the west of London, and Yantlet Creek had been claimed by the City of London since 1197 under a charter of Richard the Lionheart. The jurisdiction was marked by the London Stones. In 1771 the Thames Navigation Commission was established from a body created twenty years earlier to handle navigation on the river. Although the commissioners were active in establishing locks and weirs above Staines, they did not interfere with the jurisdiction of the City of London.

The City of London Corporation built a series of locks from Teddington to Penton Hook at the beginning of the 19th century. They also used material from the demolished Old London Bridge to support the embankments between Sunbury and Shepperton.

However trouble arose around 1840 when the government proposed building the Victoria Embankment and the Crown claimed title to the river bed. The dispute simmered on for 17 years.

Thames Conservancy Act 1857
- Act of Parliament
- Parliament of the United Kingdom
- Long title: An Act to provide for the Conservation of the River Thames, and for the Regulation, Management, and Improvement thereof.
- Citation: 20 & 21 Vict. c. cxlvii
- Territorial extent: United Kingdom

Dates
- Royal assent: 17 August 1857
- Commencement: 17 August 1857 (Note: The Acts of Parliament (Commencement) Act 1793.)
- Repealed: 17 August 1894
Other legislation
Repealed by	Thames Conservancy Act 1894

Status: Repealed

Text of statute as originally enacted

Meanwhile, as a result of competition from the railways, the volume of traffic on the river had been drastically reduced. Income from tolls fell from £16,000 in 1839 to less than £8,000 in 1849, while maintenance charges for 1850 were estimated at nearly £7,000. The City's unwillingness to pay for necessary expenditure led to complaints, and a legal dispute arose as to whether the rights in the river vested in the Crown or the City. By the Thames Conservancy Act 1857 (20 & 21 Vict. c. cxlvii), the issue was avoided, and all rights in the river, whether held by the Crown or by the City were transferred them to the new body.

All the Estate, Right, Title, and Interest of the Mayor and Commonalty and Citizens of the City of London in the Bed and Soil and Shores of the River Thames, from Staines in the County of Middlesex to Yantlett in the County of Kent, and all the Estate, Right, Title, and Interest to which Her Majesty was on the Twenty-third Day of February One thousand eight hundred and fifty-seven entitled in right of Her Crown of, in, and to the Bed and Soil and Shores of the River Thames within the Flux and Reflux of the Tides, bounded Eastward by an imaginary Line to be drawn from the Entrance of Yantlett Creek in the County of Kent on the Southern Shore of the said River to the City Stone opposite to Canvey Island in the County of Essex on the Northern Shore of the said River, and of, in, and to all Encroachments, Embankments, and Inclosures therefrom or thereupon, except such Parts thereof as are herein-after specified, shall from and after the Commencement of this Act be and the same are hereby vested in the Conservators. — Section 50, Thames Conservancy Act 1857 (20 & 21 Vict. c. cxlvii)

=== First conservancy (1857) ===
The City of London handed its inventory to the Thames Conservancy in October 1857. In June 1857 the first stone of a new lock at Teddington had been laid at the present position, being the central of the three locks. The conservancy opened it in 1858 together with the narrow skiff lock, (known as "the coffin"). and the conservancy soon imposed regulations. In 1858 a toll of 15 shillings was imposed on every steam vessel passing Teddington Lock, and a speed limit set to five miles per hour. This was amended to 5 mph with the stream and 4 mph against it. Netting from Richmond to Staines was prohibited forever. The new authority reaffirmed the rights of anglers against interference from landowners and received a notice from the water bailiff drawing attention to the "improper practice of letting boats for hire to inexperienced persons". At this time the management of the bulk of the upstream river was the responsibility of the Thames Navigation Commissioners, but this changed in 1866.

=== Second conservancy (1866) ===
Thames Navigation Act 1866 (Note: Section 1.)
- Act of Parliament
- Parliament of the United Kingdom
- Long title: An Act for vesting in the Conservators of the River Thames the Conservancy of the Thames and Isis from Staines in the County of Middlesex to Cricklade in the County of Wilts; and for other Purposes connected therewith.
- Citation: 29 & 30 Vict. c. 89
- Territorial extent: United Kingdom

Dates
- Royal assent: 6 August 1866
- Commencement: 6 August 1866
- Repealed: 17 August 1894
Other legislation
Repealed by	Thames Conservancy Act 1894

Status: Repealed

Text of statute as originally enacted

In 1866 it was considered expedient to put the navigation of the whole of the river under one management It was said that the Thames Commissioners were too numerous, the locks and weirs on the River Thames were in a bad condition and income was insufficient to pay for maintenance. It was believed that under single management with the upper river maintained properly and with lower tolls overall the traffic would increase. On 6 August 1866, the Thames Navigation Act 1866 (29 & 30 Vict. c. 89) allowed the Thames Conservancy to take over management of the river from Cricklade to Yantlet Creek, a distance of 177 miles (285 km).

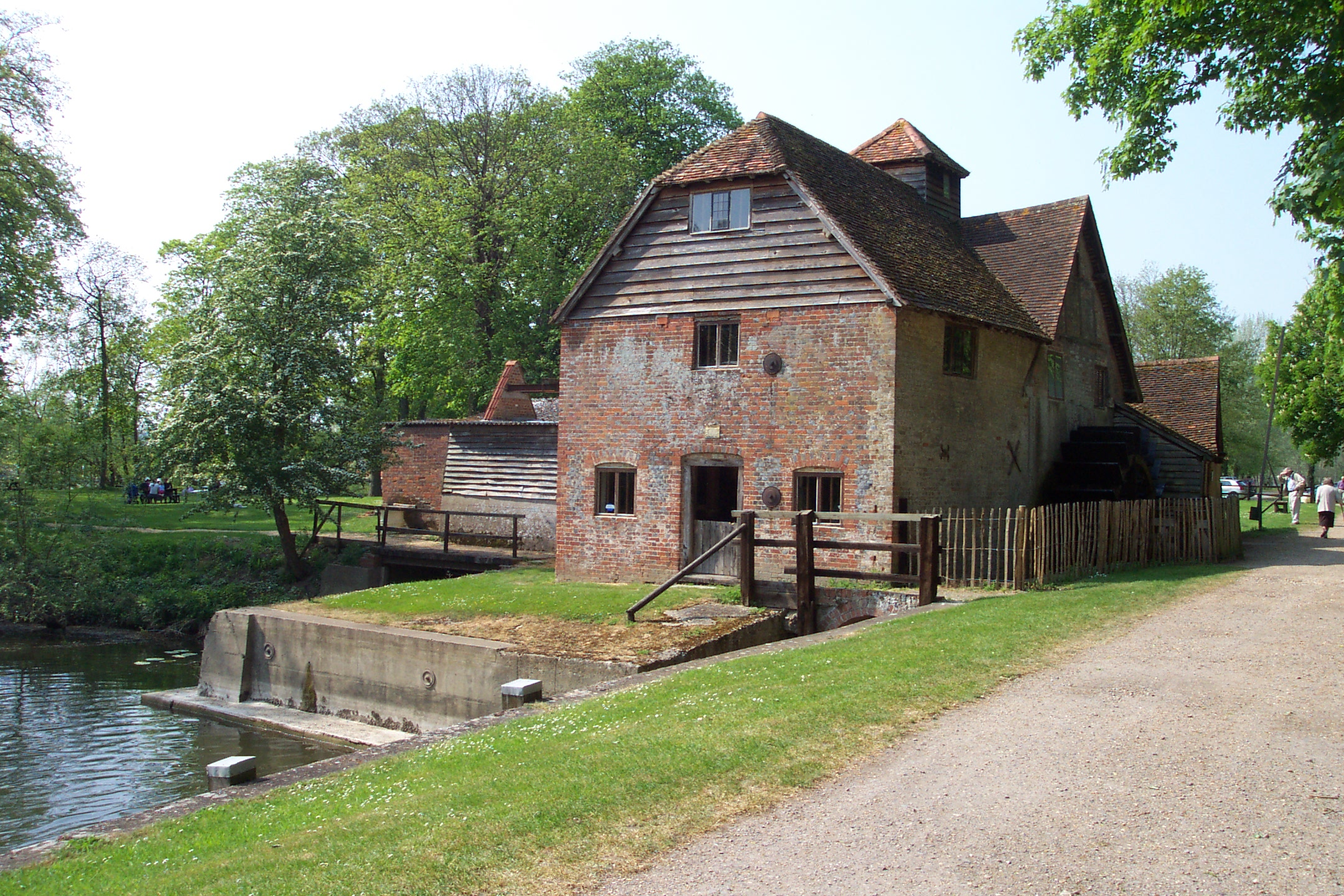
Mapledurham Watermill was one of the 28 mills still operating in 1866

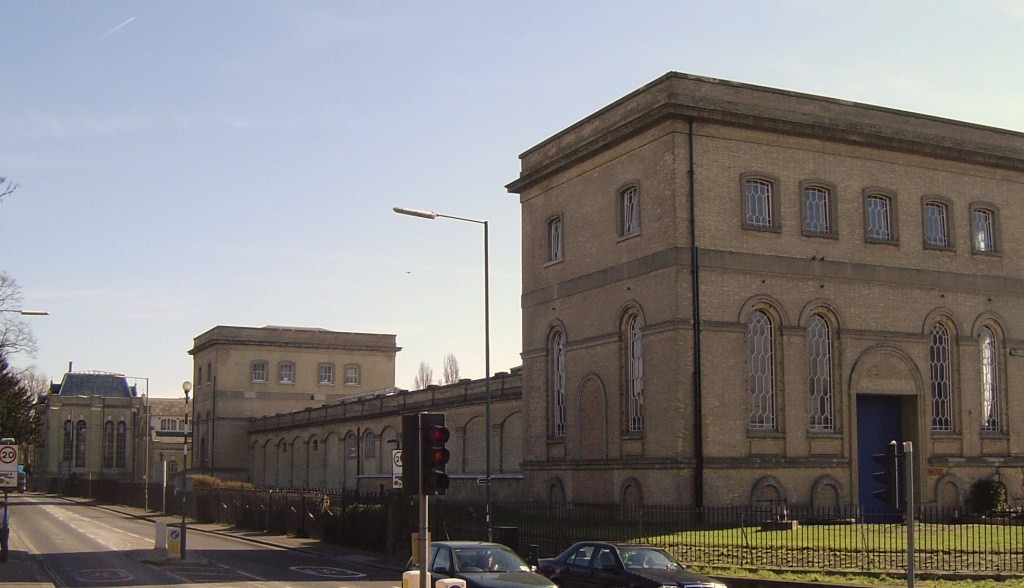
The waterworks buildings at Hampton

Under the act, all locks canals and other works of the commissioners were transferred to the conservancy. In addition provision was made for all weirs to be transferred to the Conservancy from private owners. Former owners of weirs were freed from liability but two weirs at Buscot and Eaton remained to the owner of Buscot Park. Most weirs belonged to the twenty eight water-mills still operating between Oxford and Staines and the entitlement to water of the mills, many of which dated back to Domesday Book, was recognised. No new flow of sewage into the river or its tributaries was allowed and existing sewage works were to be removed. New revenue was raised by a £1,000 per annum charge on each of the five water companies. The Southwark and Vauxhall, Grand Junction and West Middlesex water companies had set up their works at Hampton in the 1850s after it became illegal to take water from the Tideway. The Lambeth and Chelsea water companies had moved initially to Seething Wells but later relocated to East Molesey. Whereas the City of London owned the river bed for its part of the river, the Thames Commissioners did not and hence Thames Conservancy did not acquire the ownership of the river bed for the section above Staines which remained (and remains) the property of the riparian owners.

In August 1866 the conservancy inspected works between Oxford and Windsor and in October settled a table of tolls. Bell Weir Lock had collapsed in June and was rebuilt the following year. In 1868 tolls were placed on three of the four locks then above Oxford – St John's, Buscot and Pinkhill Locks. Rushey Lock was omitted and there were no tolls on the weirs. This reflects the poor state of navigation above Oxford. Some of the old locks on the rest of the river were still wooden pens and these were gradually renewed or replaced. Works completed in 1869 included the rebuilding of Romney Lock and the addition of a boat slide at Teddington. In 1870 Hambleden Lock and Benson Lock were rebuilt, followed by Day's Lock in 1871 and Godstow Lock in 1872. In the 1870s it is recorded that Teddington weir collapsed twice causing enormous damage.

In 1872 the conservancy promised to reopen navigation between Radcot and Newbridge by repairing Rushey Lock but in 1874 recognised that they lacked the funds to meet the promise. There were regular complaints at this time about the poor state of river particularly in upper reaches and the persistence of sewage.

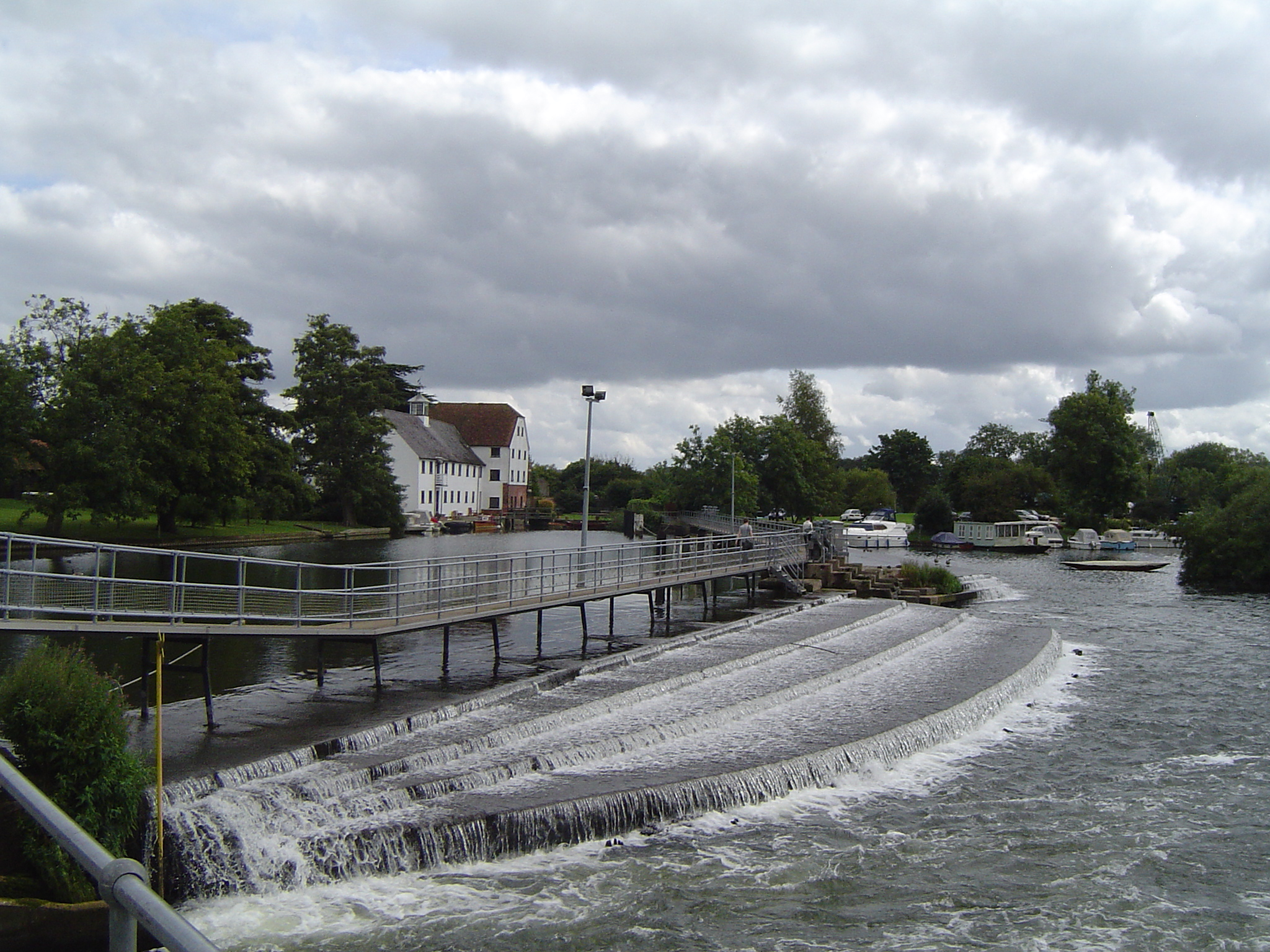
Weir, mill and walkway at Hambleden

Lock replacements continued with Shiplake and Cleeve in 1874, Caversham in 1875, Whitchurch in 1876 and Bell Weir in 1877. In 1883 the conservancy removed the lock at Chalmore Hole at Wallingford, after many years petitioning by residents of Wallingford for its retention. The weirs at Hambleden were built in 1884 and the public right of way across the river sustained by building the walkway. Bray Lock was rebuilt in 1885.

Thames Preservation Act 1885 (Note: Section 30.)
- Act of Parliament
- Parliament of the United Kingdom
- Long title: An Act for the preservation of the River Thames above Teddington Lock for purposes of public recreation, and for regulating the pleasure traffic thereon.
- Citation: 48 & 49 Vict. c. 76
- Territorial extent: United Kingdom

Dates
- Royal assent: 14 August 1885
- Commencement: 14 August 1885
- Repealed: 17 August 1894
Other legislation
Repealed by	Thames Conservancy Act 1894

Status: Repealed

Text of statute as originally enacted

The Thames Preservation Act 1885 (48 & 49 Vict. c. 76) was passed to enshrine the preservation of river for public recreation. It prohibited shooting on the river which had become a cause of concern. The act noted "It is lawful for all persons for pleasure or profit to travel or to loiter upon any and every part or the river" (apart from private cuts). The river had become exceedingly popular for sport and leisure. Many regattas or "aquatic fetes" had been instigated and Jerome K. Jerome's Three Men in a Boat published in 1889 described a typical boating journey.

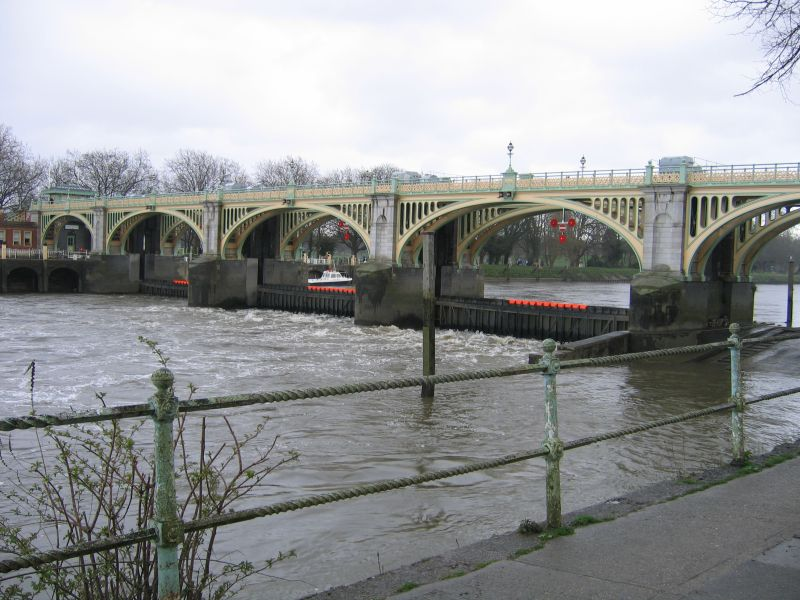
Richmond Lock and Footbridge

Lock replacements continued with Marsh in 1888, Temple in 1890 and Cookham in 1892 The first new lock was built at Radcot Lock in 1892, and Chertsey Lock was lengthened in 1893. A major work in 1894 was the Richmond Lock and weir complex built to ensure that there is always at least a 5 feet 8 inches (1.73 m) depth of water in the river between Richmond and Teddington.

The Thames Conservancy Act 1894 (57 & 58 Vict. c. clxxxvii) consisted mainly of tidying up legislation. The conservancy finally addressed navigation above Oxford, replacing the existing weirs with locks and footbridges where there was a right of way. New locks were Grafton Lock and Northmoor Lock in 1896 and Shifford Lock in 1898. Also in 1898 the conservancy rebuilt Pinkhill and Rushey. Downstream, Boveney was rebuilt in 1898, with the old lock replaced by a boat slide and Shepperton was also rebuilt on a different alignment in 1899.

By the end of the 19th century the advance in the size of ships and the growth of the Port of London raised questions of management and a royal commission reported in 1900 recommending that a single body take responsibility for the port.

Meanwhile at Teddington, the barge lock, the largest lock on the river at 650 feet (200 m), was built in 1904–1905. Locks rebuilt in 1905 included Abingdon, St Johns, Sonning and Osney. Molesey Lock was replaced in 1906 and Mapledurham Lock in 1908.

=== After separation of the Port of London Authority ===
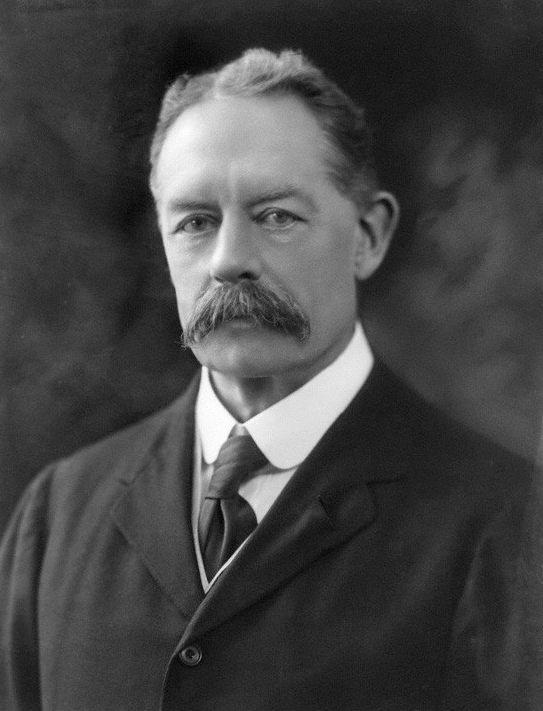
Lord Desborough, long-serving chairman, took office in 1905

The Port of London Act 1908 (8 Edw. 7. c. 68) transferred responsibility for the Tideway including Richmond Lock to the Port of London Authority, which began its duties on 31 March 1909. A demarcation point set the authorities' shared boundary as that of the parishes of Teddington and Twickenham, with an obelisk 350 yards (320 m) below Teddington Lock: the Thames Conservancy remained responsible for the non-tidal river between Cricklade and Teddington.

Lock rebuilds took place at Penton Hook in 1909 and Hurley in 1910. In 1912 the conservancy undertook major works at Boulter's Lock, which involved the purchase of Ray Mill Island. Chertsey Lock was lengthened in 1913 and Marsh Lock rebuilt in 1914. Goring Lock was rebuilt in 1921 with a third central set of gates and Godstow Lock rebuilt in 1924. In 1927 a new lock was built at Sunbury, the old one being retained. Marlow Lock and Iffley Lock were redeveloped in the same years. In 1928 the improvement to navigation above Oxford was finally completed with the building of Eynsham Lock and King's Lock.

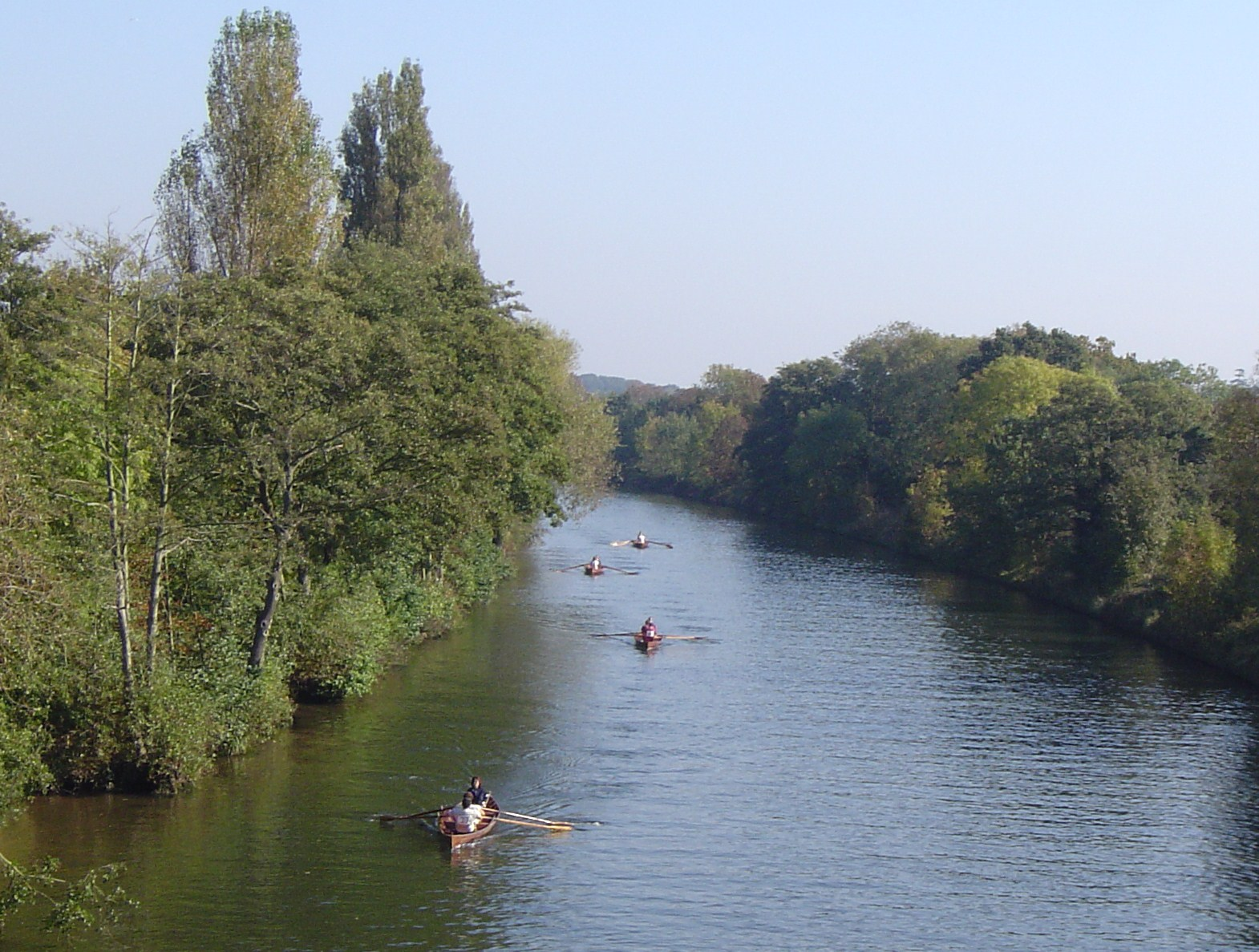
Desborough Cut

The next significant undertaking was the digging of Desborough Cut between 1930 and 1935. The 3/4–mile (1 km) cut took the river on a straight course between Weybridge and Walton on Thames, and avoiding a meandering stretch past Shepperton and its Lower Halliford locale. The channel cut the regularity of flooding in Chertsey and Old Shepperton and halved the distance of travel on that part of the river.

The Thames Conservancy Act 1932 (22 & 23 Geo. 5. c. xxxvii) dealt with construction of jetties and landing stages on the river.

In the 1960s modernisation of the locks began with the first hydraulic system introduced at Shiplake Lock in 1961. Sandford Lock was rebuilt in 1972.

=== Governance ===
Significant change in the structure of the conservancy in the 20th century began with the passing of the Land Drainage Act 1930 (20 & 21 Geo. 5. c. 44). This created catchment boards and drainage boards over much of England and Wales, but the Thames above Teddington was treated as a special case, as outlined in section 79 of that act. The conservators automatically became a catchment board, and were required to carry out the drainage functions described in section 34 of the act, although not until two years after the act came into force. All the existing conservators had to resign, although they could be reappointed as part of the new regime. Schedule 6 contained a list of who was responsible for the appointment of the 31 new members, which consisted mostly of county councils and county borough councils, together with one appointed by the Minister of Agriculture and Fisheries, one by the Board of Trade and one by the Minister of Transport. The Minister of Agriculture and Fisheries could also appoint three additional members after consultation with internal drainage boards. The new conservators were required to keep separate accounts relating to their activities under the act, and those relating to activities bestowed on them by various Conservancy Acts dating from 1894 to 1924.

Thames Conservancy Act 1950 (Note: Section 1(1).)
- Act of Parliament
- Parliament of the United Kingdom
- Long title: An Act to amend the Thames Conservancy Act 1932 to extend the powers and make further provision for the revenue of the Conservators of the river Thames and for other purposes.
- Citation: 14 Geo. 6. c. l
- Territorial extent: United Kingdom

Dates
- Royal assent: 28 July 1950
- Commencement: 28 July 1950
Other legislation
Amends	Thames Conservancy Act 1932
Amended by	Thames Conservancy Act 1959; SI 1964/1251; Thames Conservancy Act 1966; Superannuation Act 1972; Thames Conservancy Act 1972
Relates to	Land Drainage Act 1961

Status: Amended

Text of statute as originally enacted

Thames Conservancy Act 1959
- Act of Parliament
- Parliament of the United Kingdom
- Long title: An Act to amend the Thames Conservancy Acts 1932 and 1950 to extend the powers and make further provision for the revenue of the Conservators of the river Thames and for other purposes.
- Citation: 7 & 8 Eliz. 2. c. xxvi
- Territorial extent: United Kingdom

Dates
- Royal assent: 9 July 1959
- Commencement: 9 July 1959
Other legislation
Amends	Thames Conservancy Act 1932; Thames Conservancy Act 1950
Amended by	Woking Water Order 1959; SI 1962/738; SI 1964/1251; Thames Conservancy Act 1966

Status: Amended

Text of statute as originally enacted

The River Boards Act 1948 (11 & 12 Geo. 6. c. 32) replaced catchment boards with river boards, covering the whole of England and Wales, but again the Thames Conservancy was treated as a special case. The act introduced new constitutional, financial and general administrative powers for the river boards, but the Thames Conservancy continued to operate under the 1930 legislation. The next change occurred with the passing of the Land Drainage Act 1961 (9 & 10 Eliz. 2. c. 48), the provisions of which were applied to the Thames Conservancy, although the conservancy did not formally become a river authority in the way that other river boards did. Mention was made in the act that the Thames Conservators derived some of their powers from the Thames Conservancy Act 1950 (14 Geo. 6. c. l) and Thames Conservancy Act 1959 (7 & 8 Eliz. 2. c. xxvi), rather than the River Boards Act 1948.

The Water Act 1973 (c. 37) abolished river authorities, replacing them with ten regional water authorities, and on 1 April 1974, the Thames Conservancy was subsumed into the new Thames Water Authority, although much of the organisation remained intact as the authority's Thames Conservancy Division. However, when Thames Water was privatised in 1990 as a result of the Water Act 1989 (c. 15), the river management functions passed to the new National Rivers Authority and in 1996 to the Environment Agency.

== Locks built by the Thames Conservancy ==
- Radcot Lock (1892)
- Richmond Lock (1894)
- Grafton Lock (1896)
- Northmoor Lock (1896)
- Shifford Lock (1898)
- Iffley Lock (1927)
- Eynsham Lock (1928)
- King's Lock (1928)

== Chairmen of Thames Conservancy ==
- Sir Frederick Dixon-Hartland (1895–1904)
- Lord Desborough (1905–1936)
- J. D. Gilbert (1937–1938)
- Sir Jocelyn Bray (1938–1960)
- Lord Nugent (1961-c.1970)

== Bibliography ==
- Dobson, Alban; Hull, Hubert (1931). The Land Drainage Act 1930. Oxford University Press.
- Hart, Dot (2005). "The River Thames — Its Management Past & Present". Archived from the original on 17 July 2011.
- Thacker, Fred S (1914). The Thames Highway:Volume I - General History. Republished by David and Charles 1968. ISBN 978-0-7153-4232-9.
- Thacker, Fred S (1920). The Thames Highway: Volume II - Locks and Weirs. Republished by David and Charles 1968. ISBN 978-0-7153-4233-6.
- Wisdom, A S (1966). Land Drainage. London: Sweet & Maxwell.
