= Northmoor, Oxfordshire =

Village in Oxfordshire, England

Coordinates: 51.723°N 1.392°W

Northmoor
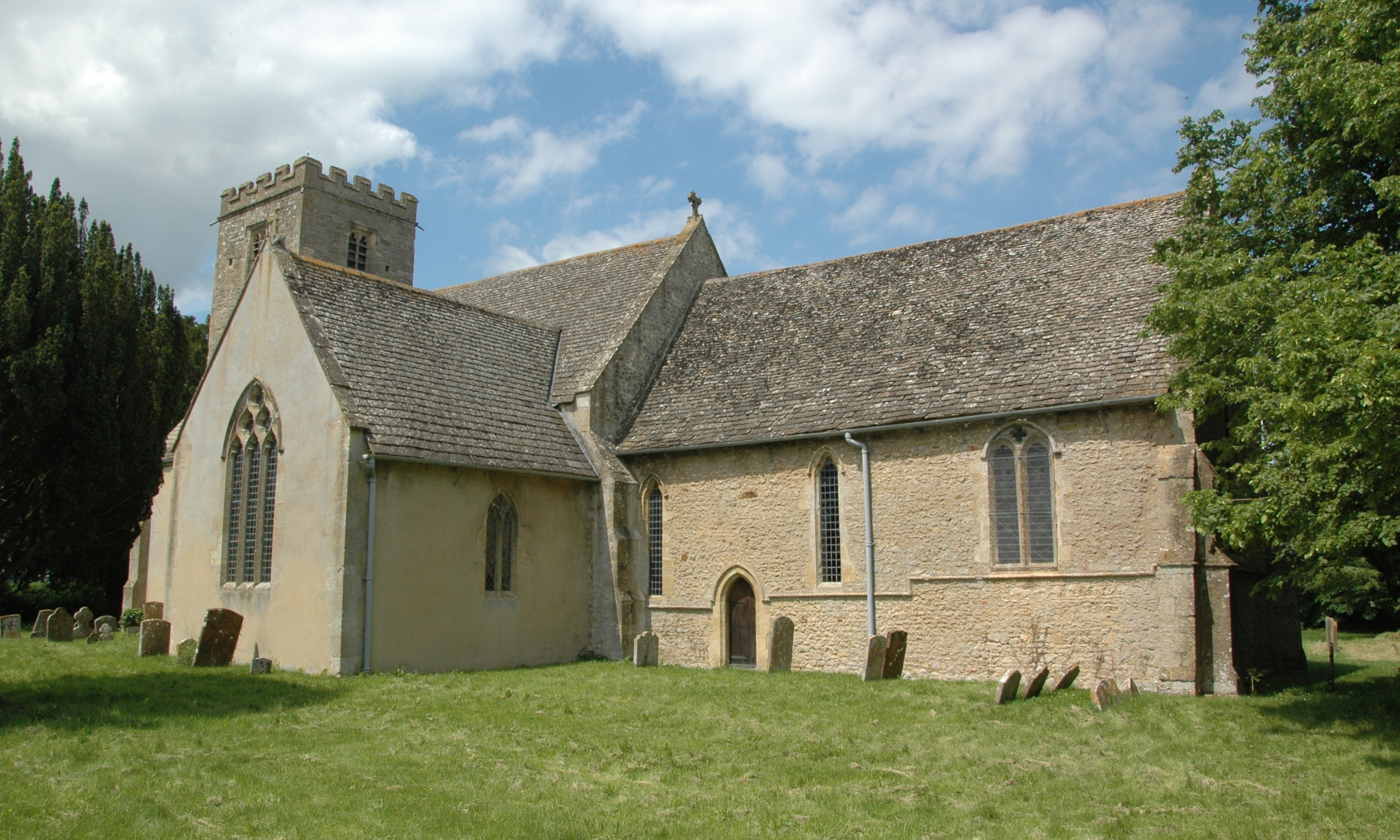
- St Denys' parish church

- Location within Oxfordshire
- Population: 377 (2011 Census)
- OS grid reference: SP4202
- Civil parish: Northmoor
- District: West Oxfordshire
- Shire county: Oxfordshire
- Region: South East
- Country: England
- Sovereign state: United Kingdom
- Post town: Witney
- Postcode district: OX29
- Dialling code: 01865
- Police: Thames Valley
- Fire: Oxfordshire
- Ambulance: South Central
- UK Parliament: Witney
- Website: Northmoor Parish Council and Community

Northmoor is a village and civil parish in West Oxfordshire, about 6 miles (10 km) west of Oxford and almost the same distance southeast of Witney. Northmoor is in the valley of the River Thames, which bounds the parish to the east and south, and is close to the River Windrush which forms part of the parish's western boundary. The 2011 Census recorded the parish's population as 377.

== Toponym ==
In the 11th century the toponym was simply More or Moor, meaning "marsh". The prefix North was added by the 13th century, distinguishing the village from Southmoor, then in Berkshire, on the other side of the Thames.

== Parish church ==
In 1059 King Edward the Confessor granted land at Northmoor to St Denis Abbey in Paris. Northmoor was made a separate parish in the 12th century, and the parish church of Saint Denys was then built. Nothing survives of this original building except the font, which is Norman. The earliest part of the present Church of England parish church on the same site is the Early English Gothic chancel, which was built in the 13th century. The chancel's east window is a set of three lancets and it has another lancet in its south wall. The present nave and north and south transepts were built early in the 14th century. The bell tower over the west bay of the nave was added in the 15th century. The tower has a ring of six bells. Abraham I Rudhall of Gloucester cast the fifth bell in 1714, and Thomas Rudhall cast all the others in 1764. The Gothic Revival architect C.C. Rolfe carried out a sensitive restoration of building in 1887. St Denys' is now a Grade I listed building.

== Economic and social history ==
Rectory Farm was built in the 16th century, and a date-stone over the entrance records alterations in 1629. The farm also has a half-timbered granary on stone stooks and a timber-framed dovecote, both from the 16th or 17th century. The granary was extended in the 18th century and is a Grade II* listed building. There used to be a flash lock on the Thames on the southern edge of the parish at Hart's Weir, also known as Ridge's Weir. In 1879 Hart's Weir Footbridge was built at the site, and in 1896 the weir and flash lock were replaced with a pound lock, Northmoor Lock, southeast of the village.

Northmoor used to have two pubs. One, the Dun Cow, ceased trading in 1991. The remaining pub is the Red Lion. In January 2014 Greene King Brewery offered it for sale, which could have led to its closure and redevelopment as private housing, with up to 12 homes built on its land. Instead villagers led by the Parish Council chairman bought the pub and turned it into a free house. The Red Lion is now one of several Oxfordshire pubs in community ownership. There is a proposal to excavate 200 acres (81 ha) of Northmoor parish for gravel extraction.

== Amenities ==
As well as the Red Lion pub, Northmoor has a village hall. The nearest village store and post office are 1.5 miles (2.4 km) away in Standlake.

First & Last Mile buses provide a daytime bus service 418 giving Northmoor a link every two hours with Standlake, Eynsham, Stanton Harcourt, and Long Hanborough.

== Gallery ==
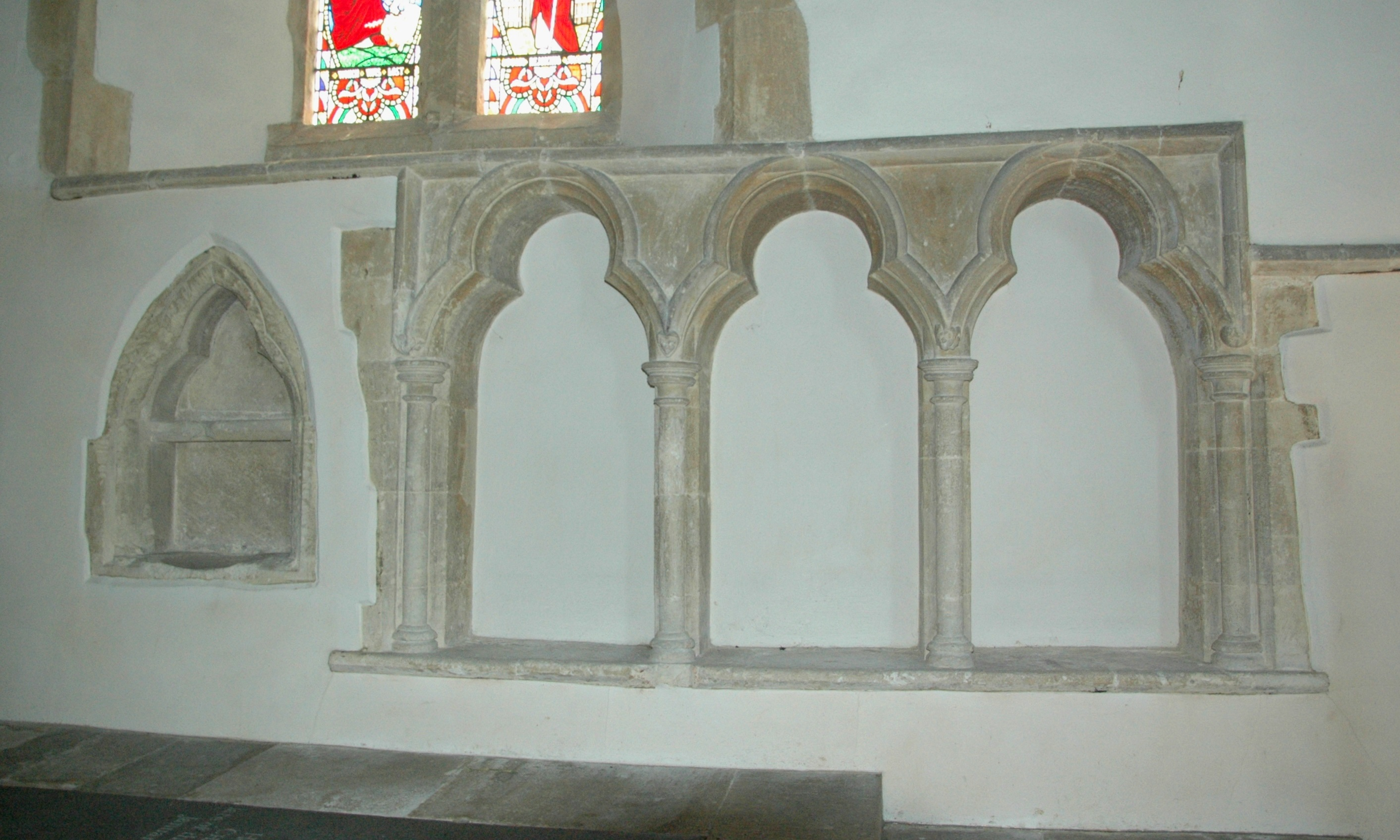
Early English piscina (left) and sedilia in the chancel of St Denys' parish church

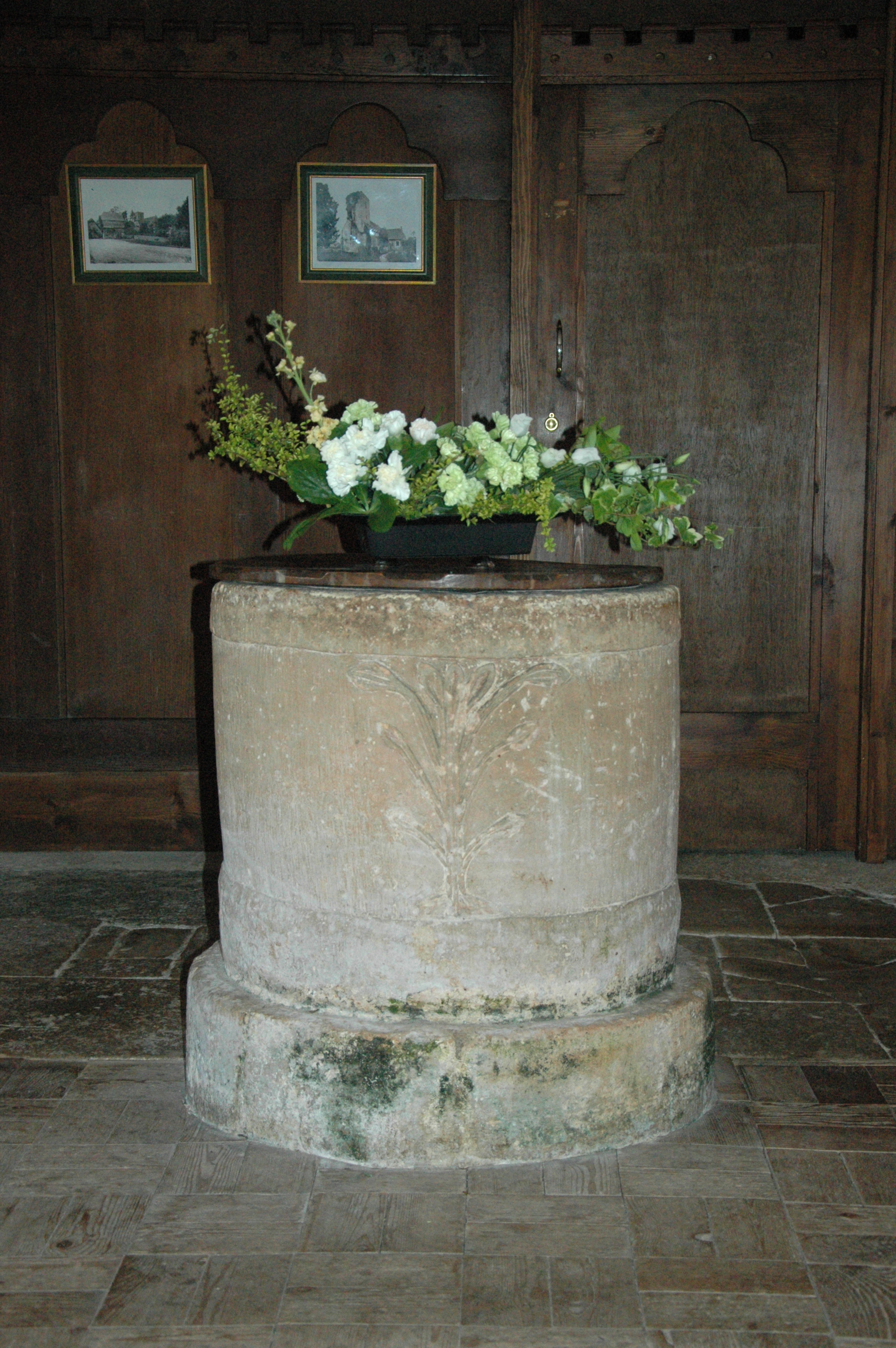
Norman baptismal font in St Denys' parish church

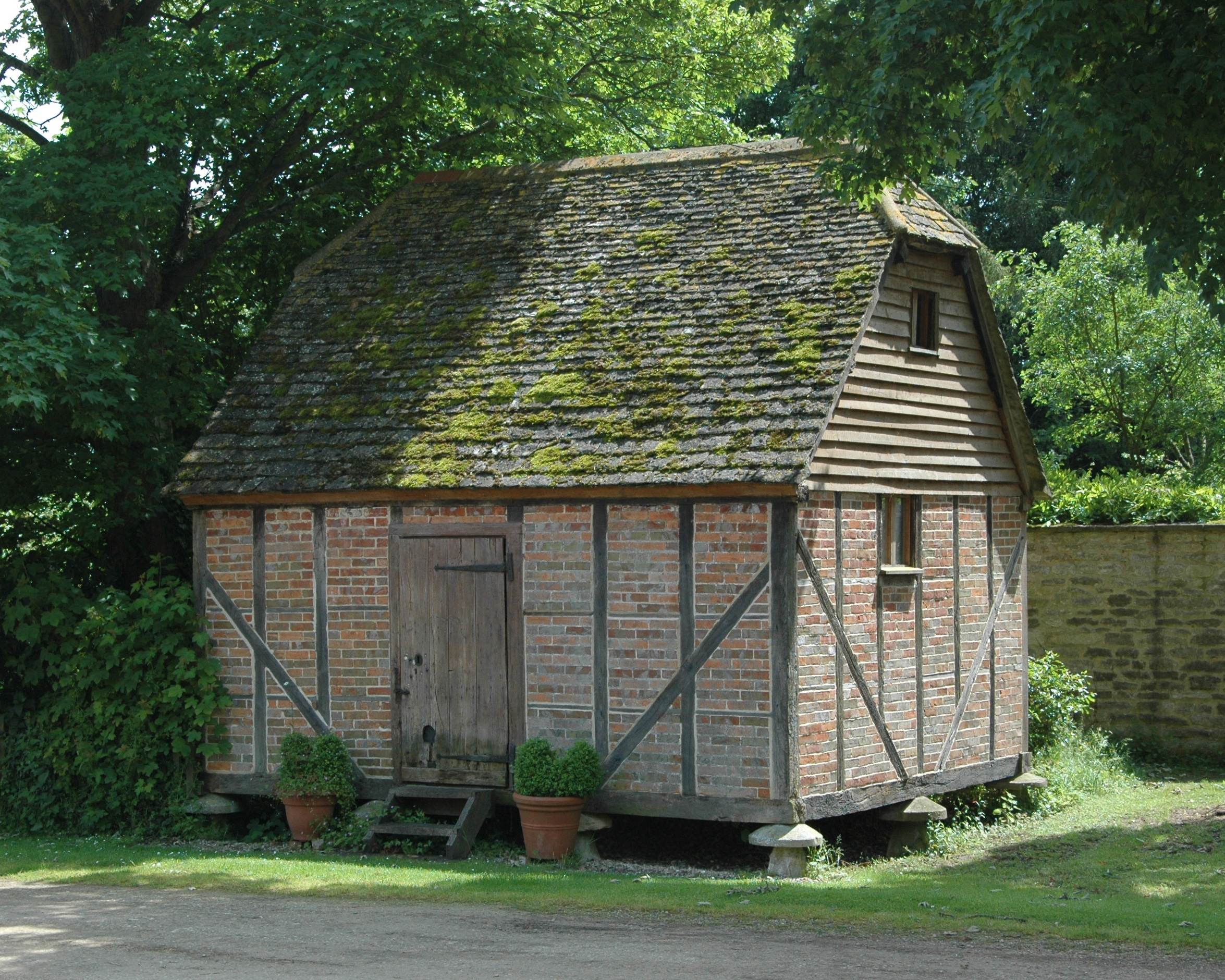
Timber-framed granary at Rectory Farm

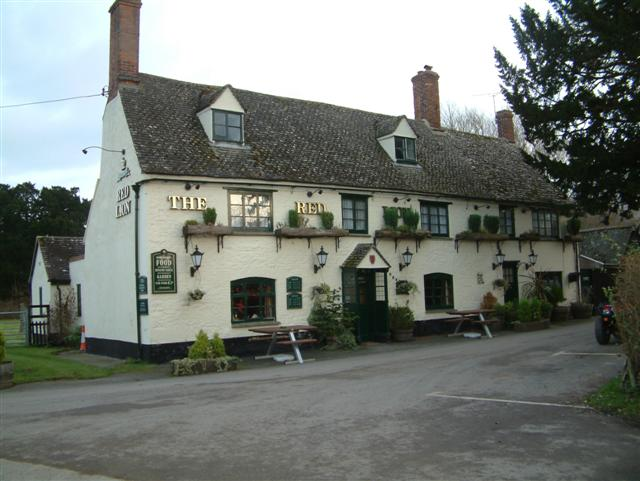
The Red Lion public house

== Sources ==
- Crossley, Alan; Currie, C.R.J. (eds.); Baggs, A.P.; Chance, Eleanor; Colvin, Christina; Day, C.J.; Selwyn, Nesta; Townley, Simon C. (1996). A History of the County of Oxford. Victoria County History. Vol. 13: Bampton Hundred (Part One). London: Oxford University Press for the Institute of Historical Research. pp. 150–171. ISBN 978-0-19722-790-9.
- Sherwood, Jennifer; Pevsner, Nikolaus (1974). Oxfordshire. The Buildings of England. Harmondsworth: Penguin Books. pp. 722–723. ISBN 0-14-071045-0.
