= Thames Conservancy Act 1932 =

Act of the Parliament of the United Kingdom

Thames Conservancy Act 1932 (Note: Section 1.)
- Act of Parliament
- Parliament of the United Kingdom
- Long title: An Act to consolidate and amend the enactments relating to the powers and duties of the Conservators of the River Thames with respect to the conservancy preservation and regulation of the Thames above the landward limit of the Port of London.
- Citation: 22 & 23 Geo. 5. c. xxxvii
- Territorial extent: United Kingdom

Dates
- Royal assent: 16 June 1932
- Commencement: 16 June 1932 (Note: Section 2.)
Other legislation
Amends	See § Repealed enactments
Repeals/revokes	See § Repealed enactments
Amended by	SR&O 1934/255; Berkshire County Council Act 1937; West Surrey Water Act 1938; Metropolitan Water Board Act 1939; Thames Conservancy Act 1950; Thames Conservancy Act 1959; Woking Water Order 1959; Police Act 1964; Thames Conservancy (New Functions of River Authorities in Thames Catchment Area) Order 1964; Thames Conservancy Act 1966; Thames Conservancy Act 1972
Relates to	Water Act 1958; British Waterways Act 1995

Status: Amended

Text of statute as originally enacted

The Thames Conservancy Act 1932 (22 & 23 Geo. 5. c. xxxvii) was an act of the Parliament of the United Kingdom that consolidated and amended the enactments relating to the powers and duties of the Conservators of the River Thames with respect to the conservancy, preservation and regulation of the Thames above the landward limit of the Port of London.

== Provisions ==
=== Repealed enactments ===
Section 6 of the act repealed 7 enactments, listed in the first schedule to the act.

Citation	Short title	Extent of repeal
57 & 58 Vict. c. clxxxvii	Thames Conservancy Act 1894	The whole act so far as not heretofore repealed.
10 Edw. 7 & 1 Geo. 5. c. cxxxiii	Thames Conservancy (Appointments and Tolls) Provisional Order Act 1910	The whole act so far as not heretofore repealed.
1 & 2 Geo. 5. c. lvii	Thames Conservancy Act 1911	The whole act so far as not heretofore repealed.
10 & 11 Geo. 5. c. clxxiii	Port of London (Consolidation) Act 1920	Section 5 (Saving of provisions relating to Upper River).
14 & 15 Geo. 5. c. lxiv	Thames Conservancy Act 1924	The whole act so far as not heretofore repealed.
18 & 19 Geo. 5. c. lxxviii	South West Suburban Water Act 1928	Section 8 (Payments by Company to conservators).
20 & 21 Geo. 5. c. 44	Land Drainage Act 1930	Subsections (2) and (3) of section 79 (Provisions as to drainage board of Thames catchment area and Conservators of River Thames) and the Sixth Schedule.
