= Thames Conservancy Act 1894 =

Act of the Parliament of the United Kingdom

Thames Conservancy Act 1894 (Note: Section 1.)
- Act of Parliament
- Parliament of the United Kingdom
- Long title: An Act to amend the constitution of and consolidate amend and extend the Statutory Powers of the Conservators of the River Thames to make further provision for the preservation and improvement of the said River for purposes of Navigation for Profit and Pleasure and as a Source of Water Supply for the Metropolis and the Suburbs thereof and for other purposes.
- Citation: 57 & 58 Vict. c. clxxxvii
- Territorial extent: United Kingdom

Dates
- Royal assent: 17 August 1894
- Commencement: 17 August 1894 (Note: The Acts of Parliament (Commencement) Act 1793.)
- Repealed: 16 June 1932
Other legislation
Repeals/revokes	See § Repealed enactments
Repealed by	Port of London Act 1908; Thames Conservancy (Appointments and Tolls) Provisional Order Act 1910; Thames Conservancy Act 1911; Port of London Act 1917; Port of London (Consolidation) Act 1920; Thames Conservancy Act 1921; Thames Conservancy Act 1924; Thames Conservancy Act 1932

Status: Repealed

Text of statute as originally enacted

The Thames Conservancy Act 1894 (57 & 58 Vict. c. clxxxvii) was an act of the Parliament of the United Kingdom that amended the constitution of, and consolidated, amended and extended the statutory powers of, the Conservators of the River Thames, for the preservation and improvement of the river for navigation and as a source of water supply for London and its suburbs.

== Provisions ==
=== Repealed enactments ===
Section 4 of the act repealed 33 enactments, listed in the first schedule to the act.

Citation	Short title	Description	Extent of repeal
Part I
20 & 21 Vict. c. cxlvii	Thames Conservancy Act 1857	The Thames Conservancy Act 1857.	The whole act.
27 & 28 Vict. c. 113	Thames Conservancy Act 1864	The Thames Conservancy Act 1864.	The whole act.
29 & 30 Vict. c. 89	Thames Navigation Act 1866	The Thames Navigation Act 1866.	The whole act.
56 & 57 Vict. c. ccxxi	London County Council (General Powers) Act 1893	The London County Council (General Powers) Act 1893.	Sections 3 & 4.
Part II
21 Jas. 1. c. 32	Thames Navigation Act 1623	An Act for making the River of Thames navigable for barges, boats and lighters from the village of Bercot in the county of Oxon unto the university and city of Oxon.	The whole act.
24 Geo. 2. c. 8	Thames and Isis Navigation Act 1750	An Act for the better carrying on and regulating the navigation of the Rivers Thames and Isis from the City of London westward to the town of Cricklade in the county of Wilts.	The whole act.
11 Geo. 3. c. 45	Thames and Isis Navigation Act 1771	An Act for improving and completing the navigation of the Rivers Thames and Isis from the City of London to the town of Cricklade in the county of Wilts.	The whole act.
15 Geo. 3. c. 11	Thames Conservancy Act 1775	An Act to amend an Act made in the eleventh year of His present Majesty's reign for improving and completing the navigation of the Rivers Thames and Isis from the City of London to the town of Cricklade in the county of Wilts.	The whole act.
28 Geo. 3. c. 51	Thames Navigation Act 1788	An Act to explain amend and enlarge the powers of so much of two Acts passed in the eleventh and fifteenth years of the reign of His present Majesty for improving and completing the navigation of the Rivers Thames and Isis from the City of London to the town of Cricklade in the county of Wilts as relates to the navigation of the said rivers from the boundary of the jurisdiction of the City of London near Staines in the county of Middlesex to the said town of Cricklade.	The whole act.
35 Geo. 3. c. 106	Thames and Isis Navigation Act 1795	An Act for amending and rendering more effectual an Act passed in the twenty-eighth year of the reign of His present Majesty intituled "An Act to explain amend and enlarge the powers of so much of two Acts passed in the eleventh and fifteenth years of the reign of His present Majesty for improving and completing the navigation of the Rivers Thames and Isis from the city of London to the town of Cricklade in the county of Wilts as relates to the navigation of the said rivers from the boundary of the jurisdiction of the City of London near Staines in the county of Middlesex to the said town of Cricklade" and for extending and enlarging the powers of the said several Acts passed in the eleventh and fifteenth years of the reign of His said present Majesty so far as the same relate to the improving and completing of the navigation of the said rivers from the jurisdiction of the City of London near Staines in the county of Middlesex to the town of Cricklade in the county of Wilts.	The whole act.
52 Geo. 3. c. xlvii	Thames Navigation (Milson's Point and Bell Weir Canal) Act 1812	An Act to authorise the Commissioners for improving and completing the navigation of the Rivers Thames and Isis from the jurisdiction of the City of London near Staines in the county of Middlesex to the town of Cricklade in the county of Wilts to make a navigable canal out of the River Thames near Milson's Point in the parish of Egham in the county of Surrey to communicate with the said river at or near Bell Weir in the said parish of Egham and to erect pound locks in such cut with necessary weirs and other works on the said navigation.	The whole act.
Part III
30 Geo. 2. c. 21	Medway Fisheries Act 1757	An Act for the more effectual preservation and improvement of the spawn and fry of fish in the River Thames and waters of Medway and for the better regulating the fishery thereof.	The whole act so far as relates to the Thames.
39 Geo. 3. c. lxix	Port of London Improvement and City Canal Act 1799	An Act for rendering more commodious and for better regulating the Port of London.	The whole act so far as the same was immediately before the passing of this act capable of being executed by the Conservators.
42 Geo. 3. c. xlix	Port of London Improvement and City Canal Act 1802	An Act to authorise the advancement of further sums of money out of the Consolidated Fund for completing the Canal and other works which by an Act passed in the thirty-ninth year of His present Majesty's reign intituled An Act for rendering more commodious and for better regulating the Port of London were directed to be made and done by the Mayor Aldermen and Commons of the City of London in Common Council assembled.	The whole act.
43 Geo. 3. c. cxxiv	Port of London Improvement and City Canal Act 1803	An Act to authorise the advancement of further sums of money out of the Consolidated Fund to be applied in the improvement of the Port of London by the Mayor Aldermen and Commons of the City of London in Common Council assembled and to empower the Lords Commissioners of His Majesty's Treasury to purchase the Legal Quays between London Bridge and the Tower of London.	The whole act.
45 Geo. 3. c. lxiii	Port of London Improvement and City Canal Act 1805	An Act to authorise the advancement of further sums of money out of the Consolidated Fund for completing the canal and other works directed to be made by an Act passed in the thirty-ninth year of His present Majesty intituled An Act for rendering more commodious and for better regulating the Port of London.	The whole act.
47 Geo. 3. Sess. 2. c. xxxi	Port of London Improvement and City Canal Act 1807	An Act to authorise the advancement of further sums of money out of the Consolidated Fund to be applied in completing the canal across the Isle of Dogs and erecting other works there and for effecting other improvements of the Port of London in execution of certain Acts already passed for these purposes.	The whole act.
10 Geo. 4. c. cxxiv	Port of London Act 1829	An Act for altering and amending the powers of an Act of the thirty-ninth year of the reign of King George the Third for rendering more commodious and for better regulating the Port of London.	The whole act.
4 & 5 Will. 4. c. 32	Tonnage Rates (Port of London) Act 1834	An Act for reducing the Tonnage Rates payable in the Port of London.	The whole act.
8 & 9 Vict. c. 86	Customs (No. 3) Act 1845	An Act for the general regulation of the Customs.	Section 139.
12 & 13 Vict. c. 90	Customs Act 1849	An Act to amend the Laws relating to the Customs.	Section 42.
14 Geo. 3. c. 91	Thames Navigation Act 1774	An Act more effectually to improve and complete the Navigation of the River Thames westward of London Bridge within the Liberties of the City of London and to prevent any vessel or barge from being moored in Taplow Mill Stream in the county of Bucks.	The whole act.
17 Geo. 3. c. 18	Thames Navigation Act 1776	An Act for enabling the Mayor Aldermen and Commons of the City of London to purchase the present Tolls and Duties payable for navigating upon the River Thames westward of London Bridge within the liberties of the City of London and for laying a small Toll in lieu thereof for the purpose of more effectually completing the said Navigation and for other purposes.	The whole act.
50 Geo. 3. c. cciv	Thames (West of London Bridge) Navigation Act 1810	An Act for amending altering and enlarging the powers of two Acts passed in the fourteenth and seventeenth years of His present Majesty in relation to the Navigation of the River Thames westward of London Bridge within the Liberties of the City of London and for the further improvement of the said Navigation.	The whole act.
52 Geo. 3. c. xlvi	Thames Navigation Act 1812	An Act for altering amending and enlarging the Powers of three Acts of His present Majesty for improving the navigation of the River Thames westward of London Bridge within the Liberties of the City of London and for further improving the said Navigation.	The whole act.
54 Geo. 3. c. ccxxiii	Thames (West of London Bridge) Navigation Act 1814	An Act for altering amending and enlarging the powers of four Acts of His present Majesty for improving the Navigation of the River Thames westward of London Bridge within the Liberties of the City of London and for further improving the said Navigation.	The whole act.
5 Geo. 4. c. cxxiii	Thames Navigation Act 1824	An Act to enable the Mayor and Commonalty and Citizens of the City of London to raise a sum of money at a reduced rate of interest to pay off the moneys now charged on the tolls and duties payable by virtue of four Acts of the reign of His late Majesty King George the Third for improving the navigation of the River Thames westward of London Bridge within the Liberties of the City of London.	The whole act.
8 Vict. c. i	City of London Borrowing Act 1845	An Act to enable the Mayor and Commonalty and Citizens of the City of London to raise a sum of money at a reduced rate of interest to pay off the moneys now charged on the tolls and duties payable by virtue of several Acts for improving the navigation of the River Thames westward of London Bridge within the Liberties of the City of London and to amend some of the said Acts.	The whole act.
30 Vict. c. ci	Thames Conservancy Act 1867	The Thames Conservancy Act 1867.	The whole act.
33 & 34 Vict. c. cxlix	Thames Navigation Act 1870	The Thames Navigation Act 1870.	The whole act.
41 & 42 Vict. c. ccxvi	Thames Conservancy Act 1878	The Thames Conservancy Act 1878.	The whole act.
46 & 47 Vict. c. lxxix	Thames Act 1883	The Thames Act 1883.	The whole act.
48 & 49 Vict. c. 76	Thames Preservation Act 1885	The Thames Preservation Act 1885.	The whole act.

== Subsequent developments ==
The whole act, so far as unrepealed, was repealed by section 6 of, and the first schedule to, the Thames Conservancy Act 1932 (22 & 23 Geo. 5. c. xxxvii), which came into force on 16 June 1932.
