= Bablock Hythe =

Hamlet in Oxfordshire, England

Coordinates: 51.735055°N 1.371145°W

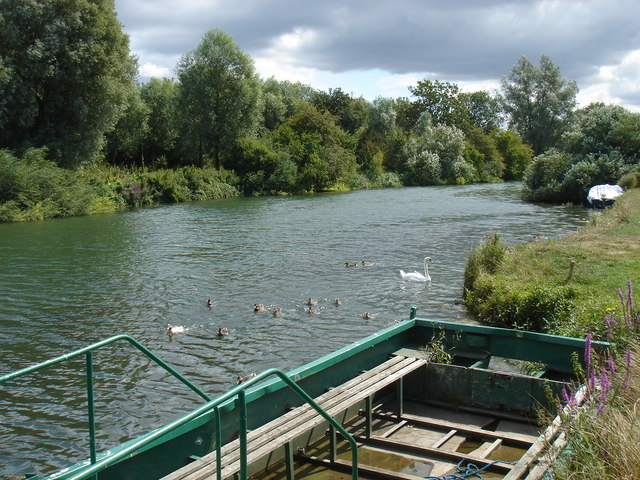
The ferry in August 2006

Bablock Hythe is a hamlet in Oxfordshire, England, some five miles (8 km) west of Oxford city centre, and located in Northmoor parish, West Oxfordshire district. Cumnor and Appleton-with-Eaton parishes in Vale of White Horse district are on the other side of the River Thames. There was a ferry across the Thames at Bablock Hythe from the 13th century. The hand-propelled cable ferry was said to be the first along the river and was still in use for cars and other road vehicles up until 1959.

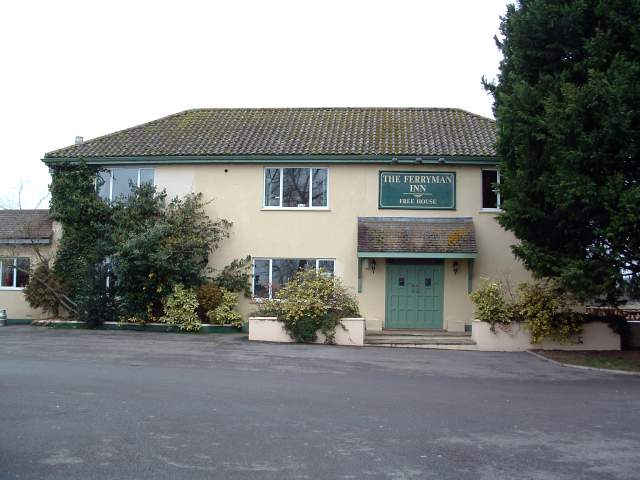
The Ferryman Inn

== Heritage ==
The earliest reference to a ferry is in 1279; later ones continued to cross until the late 20th century. The ferry was a wide-beamed ferry punt with a rope or chain in the river, which presented something of a hazard to navigation. There was also an ancient inn, described by William Senior in his Royal River in the 1880s. This was rebuilt in the early 1990s. The site is overlooked by the "Warm green-muffled Cumnor Hills", which now holds an extensive caravan site. The poet Matthew Arnold described the area in his 1853 work "The Scholar Gipsy":

Thee, at the ferry, Oxford riders blithe,
Returning home on summer nights, have met
Crossing the stripling Thames at Bablock-hithe
Trailing in the cool stream thy fingers wet
As the slow punt swings round.

== See also ==
- Crossings of the River Thames
