= Hart's Weir Footbridge =

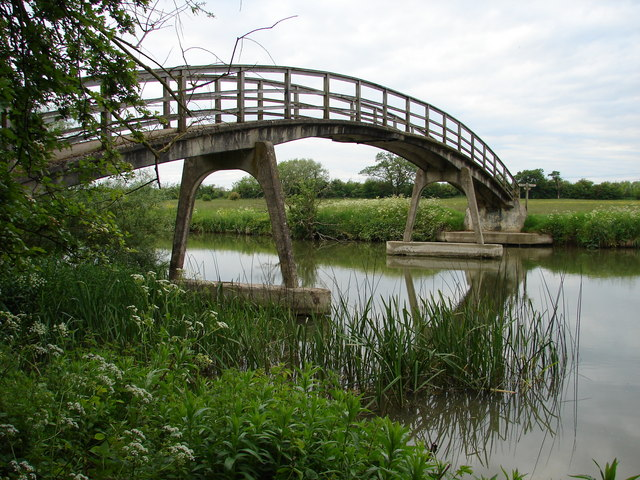
- Coordinates: 51.706487°N 1.393298°W
- Carries: Footpath
- Crosses: River Thames
- Locale: Appleton, Oxfordshire

Characteristics
- Material: Concrete
- Height: 10 feet 9 inches (3.28 m)
- No. of spans: 1

History
- Opened: 1879

Hart's Weir Footbridge is a single-span concrete footbridge across the River Thames in Oxfordshire, England. Locally, it is also known as Rainbow Bridge, due to its rainbow-arc appearance as seen from the horizon. It is situated on the reach above Northmoor Lock, the nearest village being Appleton, Oxfordshire to the east.

The bridge was built in 1879 on the site of a weir that was removed a year later. Then known as Hart's Weir, it had previously been Ridge's, Langley's, Cock's, Rudge's, and Butler's Weir. Sixteen years later Northmoor Lock was built downstream.

== See also ==
- Crossings of the River Thames

| Next crossing upstream | River Thames | Next crossing downstream |
| Newbridge (road) | Hart's Weir Footbridge | Pinkhill Lock (pedestrian) |
