= Flash lock =

Gate in the flow of a river which could be opened to allow boats through

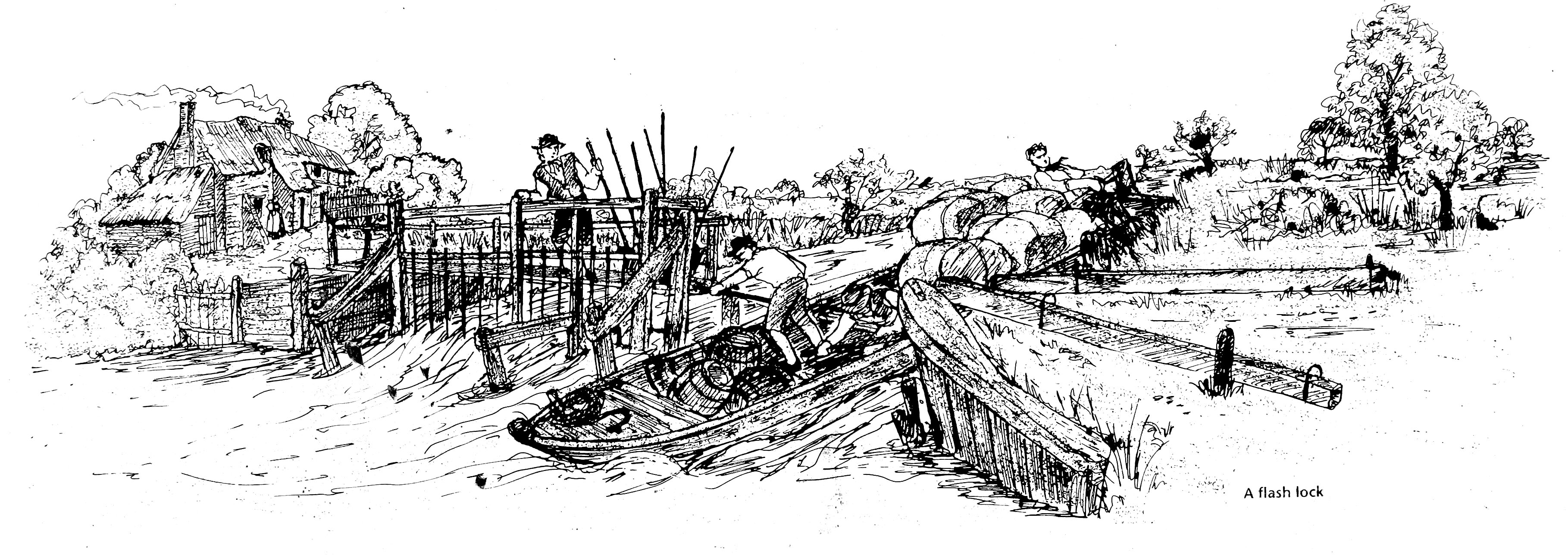
A drawing of a boat passing downstream through a flash lock

A flash lock is a type of lock for river or canal transport.

Early locks were designed with a single gate, known as a flash lock or staunch lock. The earliest European references to what were clearly flash locks were in Roman times.

== Development ==
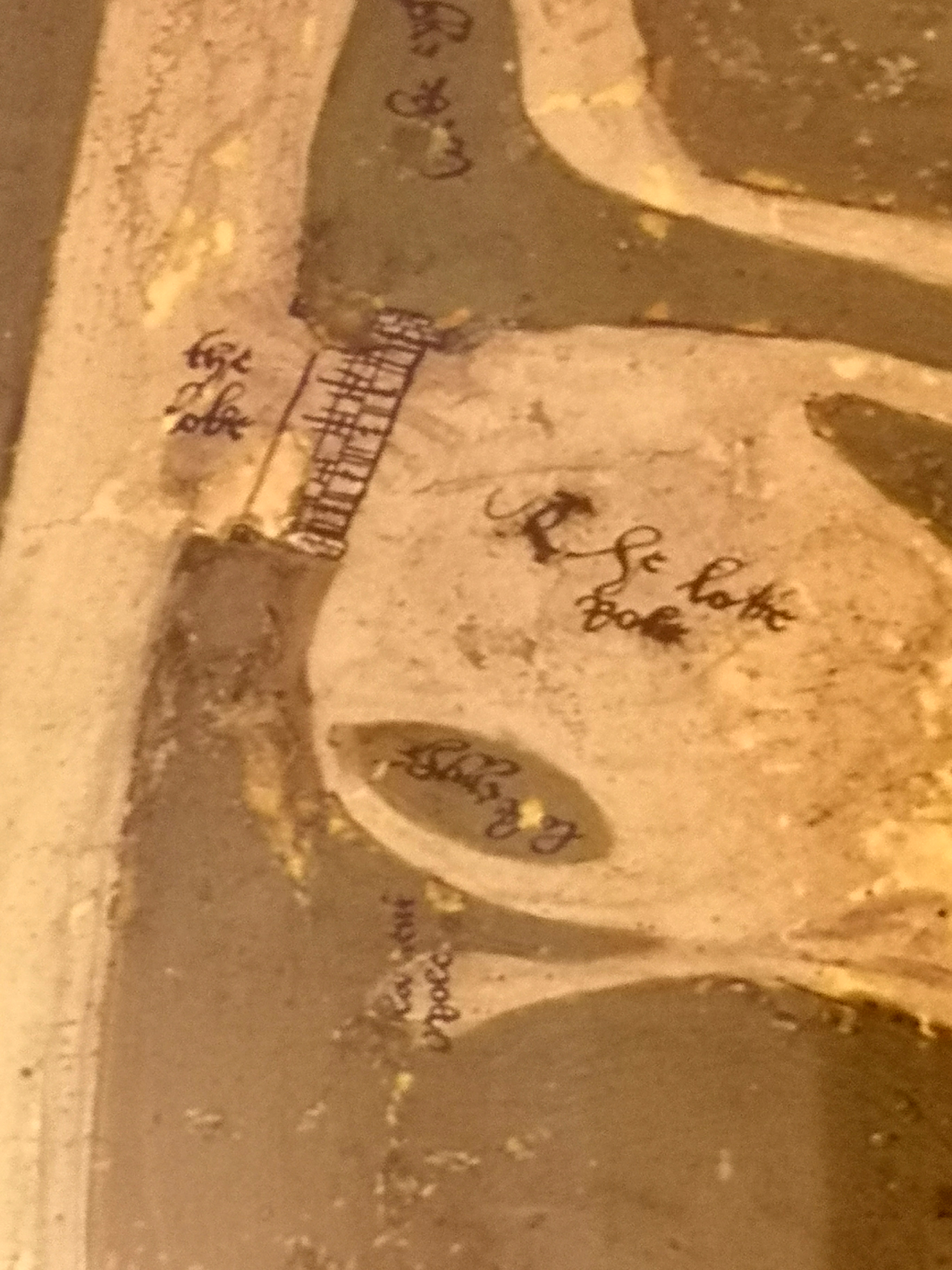
Detail from 16th century Abingdon Monks' Map showing Abingdon Lock as a flash lock

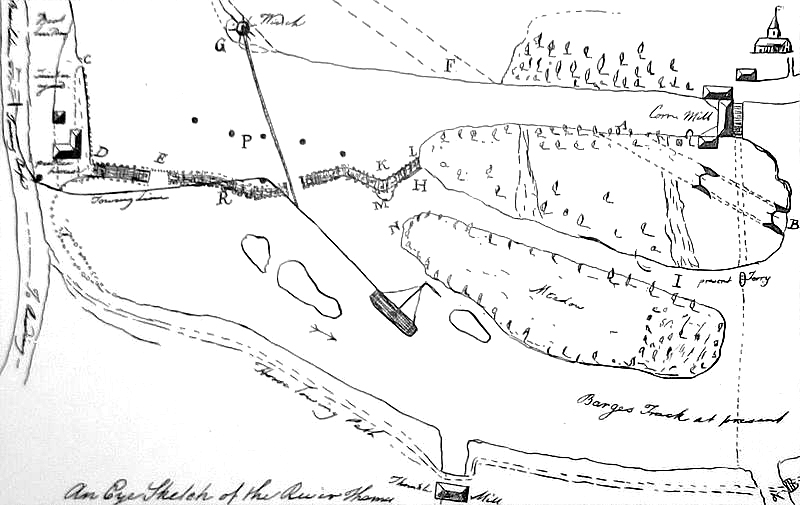
Sketch map of a flash lock on the River Thames between Whitchurch-on-Thames and Pangbourne around 1786, showing method of winching a barge up over a weir. Flash locks were common on the Thames above Staines.

In England the "gate" was similar to a temporary needle dam: a set of boards, called paddles, supported against the current by upright timbers called rymers which normally kept the level of water above it to navigable levels. Boats moving downstream would wait above the lock until the paddles (and their rymers) were removed, which would allow a "flash" of water to pass through, carrying the boats with it. Boats moving upstream would be winched or towed through the lock with the paddles removed. Considerable skill was involved both in removing the paddles in a timely manner and navigating the boat through the lock. Flash locks of this type have been documented in China since at least the 1st century BCE and on the Thames since at least 1295.

Flash locks were commonly built into small dams or weirs where a head of water was used for powering a mill. The lock allowed boats to pass the weir while still allowing the mill to operate when the gate was closed. However it could take up to a day or even more to restore the water levels after a boat had passed, so their use was unpopular with the millers.

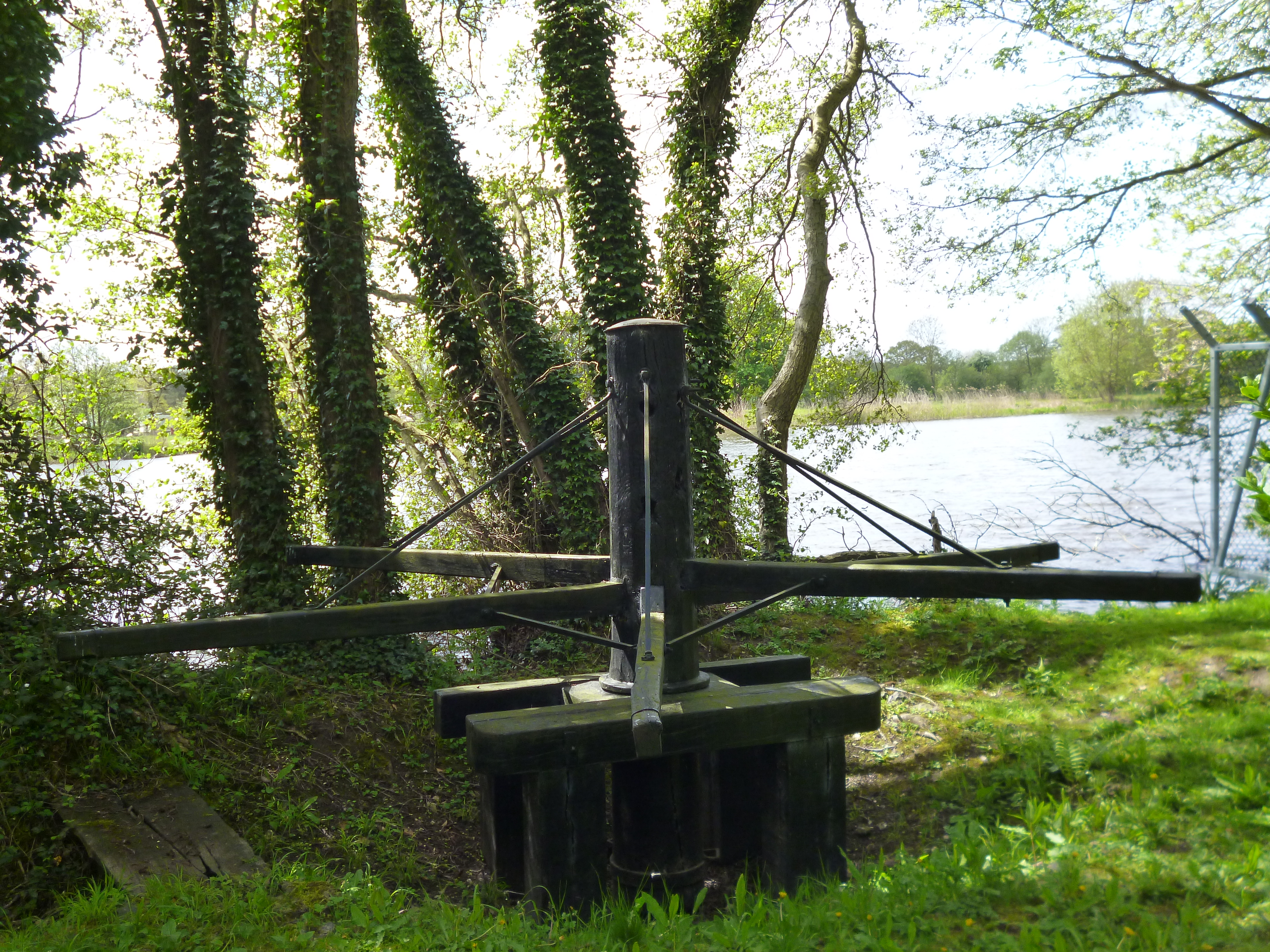
Capstan Wheel near Hurley, England, that was used to winch boats upstream past a flash lock. It is said to be the only one left in England and was restored in 1999.

As navigation increased in importance, improvements were made to the basic design, and they came to be known by various names according to where they were located. Thus on the Thames they were called navigation weirs, on the East Anglian rivers they were called staunches or stanches, those on the River Avon, Warwickshire were called water gates, and in a number of instances they were called half locks. On the River Nene and some of the tributaries of the River Great Ouse, a design using a guillotine gate in a wooden frame was used from the early seventeenth century onwards. The gate was opened by operating a large spoked wheel, connected by chains to a toothed drum.

The pound lock holds water between two gates, and is considerably easier to navigate. Pound locks have been built in China since 983, in the Netherlands from 1065 and in Britain from the 1560s. Nevertheless, a few flash locks remained after the introduction of pound locks. Flash locks on the Nene continued to be used until they were replaced in a programme of modernisation, which included building new locks, carried out between 1936 and 1941. The last flash lock on the Thames was Hart's Lock (also known as Eaton Lock), which lasted until 1937, while on the Lower Avon, the structure of Cropthorne Water Gate lasted until the reopening of the river to navigation in 1961, although it had not been used for navigation for many years before that. Although slightly different in concept, Thames Lock at Weybridge on the Wey Navigation had an additional single gate some 100 yards (91 m) below the lock, which when closed raises the water level above it, allowing boats which would normally foul the cill to work through the lock. It continued in use until 1969, to enable grain barges to use the lock, and although grain traffic stopped in that year, it recommenced in 1981, when the gate was again used. The gate is still used at the lock-keeper's discretion for boats which have a draught exceeding 1.75 feet (0.53 m).

== Paddle and rymer weirs ==
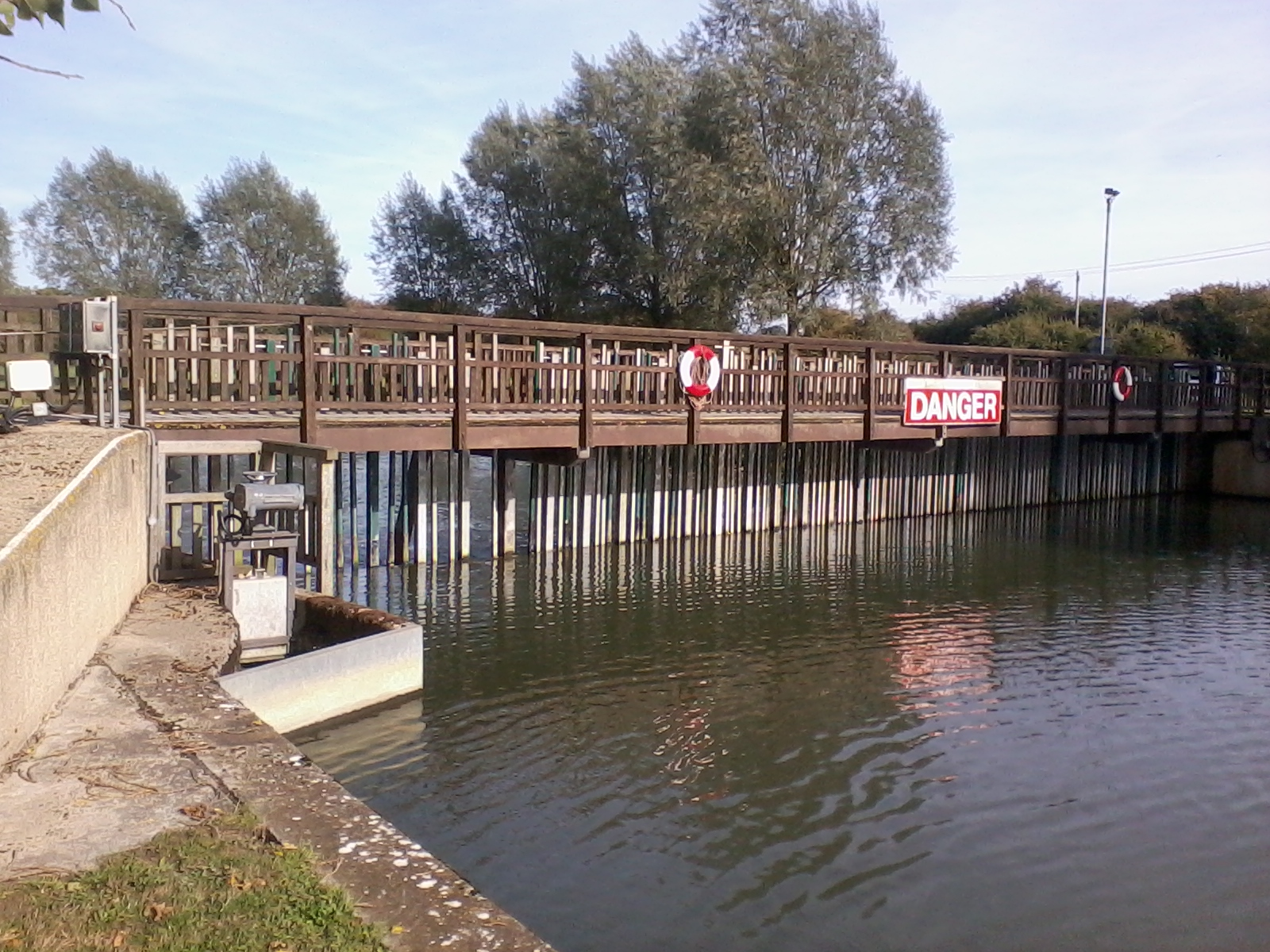
Paddle and Rymer weir on the Thames

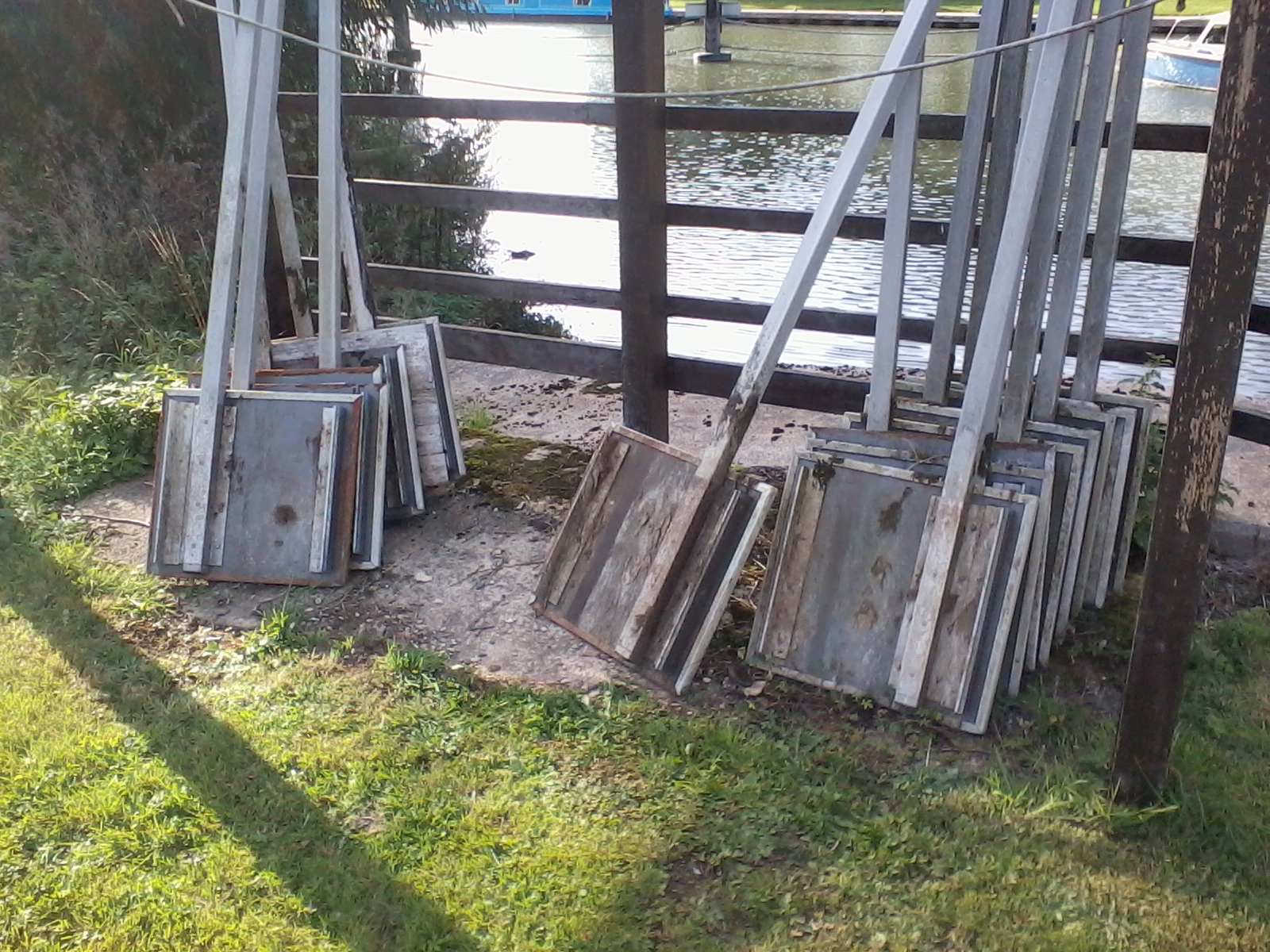
Paddles stored for use at Northmoor Lock

The weirs which are the remnants of flash locks can still be seen on the River Thames though they are not used any more for navigation as regular pound locks were introduced in the eighteenth and nineteenth centuries and the last flash lock removed in 1937. The Environment Agency is now involved in a programme of replacing these paddle and rymer weirs, as their manual operation is considered to be dangerous, and involves lifting weights which exceed those recommended by the Manual Handling Operations Regulations 1992. Most weirs on the River Thames in the present day are operated with the aid of hydraulics and other less-dangerous manual modes of operation.

Two or three paddles are stacked between each of the rymers, which slot into a beam placed on the bottom of the river. The paddles are of differing lengths allowing a very fine adjustment of the amount of water flowing through the weir.

Four of these weirs were replaced in 2009. Three were on the Thames at Mapledurham, Molesey and Radcot, while the fourth was at Blake's Lock, the first lock on the River Kennet, which is managed as part of the Thames. Three more of these weirs, at Rushey, Goring and Streatley, have been Grade II listed since 2009, but the EA is proposing to replace most of Rushey, which would be the only full-width example left.
